= 2023 St. Louis Film Critics Association Awards =

Awards ceremony

20th StLFCA Awards

December 17, 2023

Best Film:
Oppenheimer

The nominees for the 20th St. Louis Film Critics Association Awards were announced on December 10, 2023.

Oppenheimer led the nominations with fourteen, followed by Killers of the Flower Moon with twelve and Barbie with eleven; the category "Best Stunts" was added. Additionally, the StLFCA recognized two groups for special merits involving the industry's labor strikes in 2023.

The winners were announced on December 17, 2023.

== Winners and nominees ==
=== Best Film ===
- Oppenheimer
  - Runner-up: Barbie
    - American Fiction
    - Anatomy of a Fall
    - The Holdovers
    - Killers of the Flower Moon
    - Maestro
    - May December
    - Past Lives
    - The Zone of Interest

=== Best Actor ===
- Cillian Murphy – Oppenheimer as J. Robert Oppenheimer
  - Runner-up: Paul Giamatti – The Holdovers as Paul Hunham
    - Bradley Cooper – Maestro as Leonard Bernstein
    - Leonardo DiCaprio – Killers of the Flower Moon as Ernest Burkhart
    - Jeffrey Wright – American Fiction as Thelonious "Monk" Ellison

=== Best Supporting Actor ===
- Ryan Gosling – Barbie as Ken
  - Runner-up: Robert Downey Jr. – Oppenheimer as Lewis Strauss (TIE)
  - Runner-up: Charles Melton – May December as Joe Yoo (TIE)
    - Sterling K. Brown – American Fiction as Clifford "Cliff" Ellison
    - Dominic Sessa – The Holdovers as Angus Tully

=== Best Original Screenplay ===
- Barbie – Greta Gerwig and Noah Baumbach
  - Runner-up: The Holdovers – David Hemingson
    - Air – Alex Convery
    - Anatomy of a Fall – Justine Triet and Arthur Harari
    - Past Lives – Celine Song

=== Best Animated Feature ===
- Spider-Man: Across the Spider-Verse
  - Runner-up: The Boy and the Heron
    - Elemental
    - Robot Dreams
    - Teenage Mutant Ninja Turtles: Mutant Mayhem

=== Best International Feature ===
- Anatomy of a Fall • France
  - Runner-up: The Zone of Interest • United Kingdom
    - Fallen Leaves • Finland
    - Perfect Days • Japan
    - The Teachers' Lounge • Germany

=== Best Cinematography ===
- Oppenheimer – Hoyte van Hoytema
  - Runner-up: Asteroid City – Robert Yeoman (TIE)
  - Runner-up: Killers of the Flower Moon – Rodrigo Prieto (TIE)
    - Maestro – Matthew Libatique
    - The Zone of Interest – Łukasz Żal

=== Best Costume Design ===
- Barbie – Jacqueline Durran
  - Runner-up: Poor Things – Holly Waddington
    - Killers of the Flower Moon – Jacqueline West and Julie O'Keefe
    - Oppenheimer – Ellen Mirojnick
    - Priscilla – Stacey Battat

=== Best Score ===
- Oppenheimer – Ludwig Göransson
  - Runner-up: Killers of the Flower Moon – Robbie Robertson (TIE)
  - Runner-up: May December – Marcelo Zarvos (TIE)
    - Spider-Man: Across the Spider-Verse – Daniel Pemberton
    - The Zone of Interest – Mica Levi

=== Best Visual Effects ===
- The Creator – Jay Cooper, Ian Comley, Neil Corbould, and Andrew Roberts
  - Runner-up: Oppenheimer – Dave Drzewiecki, Scott R. Fisher, Andrew Jackson, and Giacomo Mineo
    - Godzilla Minus One – Takashi Yamazaki
    - Guardians of the Galaxy Vol. 3 – Theo Bialek, Stéphane Ceretti, Alexis Wajsbrot, and Guy Williams
    - Mission: Impossible – Dead Reckoning Part One – Simone Coco, Neil Corbould, Jeff Sutherland, and Alex Wuttke

=== Best Comedy Film ===
- The Holdovers
  - Runner-up: Barbie
    - American Fiction
    - Are You There God? It's Me, Margaret.
    - Bottoms

=== Best Scene ===
- Barbie – Gloria's monologue on the impossible standards set for women
  - Runner-up: John Wick: Chapter 4 – Fight on the 222 steps leading up to the Sacré-Cœur Basilica in Paris
    - Killers of the Flower Moon – Radio show finale
    - Maestro – Leonard Bernstein conducts the London Symphony Orchestra in Mahler's Symphony No. 2 at Ely Cathedral
    - Oppenheimer – Trinity test

=== Best Director ===
- Christopher Nolan – Oppenheimer
  - Runner-up: Greta Gerwig – Barbie
    - Todd Haynes – May December
    - Martin Scorsese – Killers of the Flower Moon
    - Celine Song – Past Lives

=== Best Actress ===
- Lily Gladstone – Killers of the Flower Moon as Mollie Burkhart
  - Runner-up: Margot Robbie – Barbie as Barbie
    - Greta Lee – Past Lives as Nora Moon
    - Natalie Portman – May December as Elizabeth Berry
    - Emma Stone – Poor Things as Bella Baxter

=== Best Supporting Actress ===
- Da'Vine Joy Randolph – The Holdovers as Mary Lamb
  - Runner-up: Rachel McAdams – Are You There God? It's Me, Margaret. as Barbara Simon
    - Emily Blunt – Oppenheimer as Kitty Oppenheimer
    - Viola Davis – Air as Deloris Jordan
    - Julianne Moore – May December as Gracie Atherton-Yoo

=== Best Adapted Screenplay ===
- Oppenheimer – Christopher Nolan; based on the book American Prometheus: The Triumph and Tragedy of J. Robert Oppenheimer by Kai Bird and Martin J. Sherwin
  - Runner-up: American Fiction – Cord Jefferson; based on the novel Erasure by Percival Everett
    - Are You There God? It's Me, Margaret. – Kelly Fremon Craig; based on the novel by Judy Blume
    - Killers of the Flower Moon – Eric Roth and Martin Scorsese; based on the book Killers of the Flower Moon: The Osage Murders and the Birth of the FBI by David Grann
    - The Zone of Interest – Jonathan Glazer; based on the novel by Martin Amis

=== Best Documentary Feature ===
- American Symphony (TIE)
- Still: A Michael J. Fox Movie (TIE)
  - Beyond Utopia
  - It Ain't Over
  - Menus-Plaisirs – Les Troisgros

=== Best Ensemble ===
- The Holdovers
  - Runner-up: Barbie (TIE)
  - Runner-up: Oppenheimer (TIE)
    - Asteroid City
    - Killers of the Flower Moon

=== Best Editing ===
- Oppenheimer – Jennifer Lame
  - Runner-up: The Killer – Kirk Baxter
    - The Holdovers – Kevin Tent
    - Killers of the Flower Moon – Thelma Schoonmaker
    - Maestro – Michelle Tesoro

=== Best Production Design ===
- Barbie – Sarah Greenwood and Katie Spencer
  - Runner-up: Poor Things – James Price, Shona Heath, and Zsuzsa Mihalek
    - Asteroid City – Adam Stockhausen
    - Killers of the Flower Moon – Jack Fisk
    - Oppenheimer – Ruth De Jong

=== Best Soundtrack ===
- Barbie
  - Runner-up: The Killer
    - Air
    - The Holdovers
    - Maestro

=== Best Action Film ===
- John Wick: Chapter 4 (TIE)
- Mission: Impossible – Dead Reckoning Part One (TIE)
  - Dungeons & Dragons: Honor Among Thieves
  - Indiana Jones and the Dial of Destiny
  - The Killer
  - Spider-Man: Across the Spider-Verse

=== Best Horror Film ===
- Talk to Me
  - Runner-up: Skinamarink
    - Evil Dead Rise
    - Knock at the Cabin
    - M3GAN

=== Best Stunts ===
- Mission: Impossible – Dead Reckoning Part One – Wade Eastwood
  - Runner-up: John Wick: Chapter 4 – Scott Rogers and Stephen Dunlevy
    - Indiana Jones and the Dial of Destiny – Mike Massa and Abdelaaziz Attougui
    - The Iron Claw – Chavo Guerrero Jr.
    - The Killer – Dave Macomber

=== Special Merits ===
- A24 – For showing solidarity with the actors and screenwriters by securing approval from SAG-AFTRA and WGA to continue filmmaking and publicity.
- The Screen Actors Guild and Writers Guild of America – For fighting for artists' equity and protecting the future of filmmaking by striking against practices that minimize or eliminate protection and living wages for artists.
