= 2023 Seattle Film Critics Society Awards =

Annual US film awards ceremony

8th Seattle Film Critics Society Awards
- Date: January 8, 2024
- Site: Seattle, Washington

Highlights
- Best Picture: Past Lives
- Most awards: Godzilla Minus One / The Holdovers (3)
- Most nominations: Killers of the Flower Moon (11); Poor Things (11)

The 8th Seattle Film Critics Society Awards were announced on January 8, 2024.

The SFCS announced the first phase of their awards with the 10 Best Films of 2023 as voted on by 100% of their 37 local member critics from all the releases of the year, along with the nominations for Pacific Northwest Filmmaking, on December 19, 2023. The remaining nominations were announced on January 3, 2024, with Killers of the Flower Moon and Poor Things leading the nominations with eleven each, followed by Oppenheimer with nine.

As part of the annual awards highlighting the best in film, the SFCS added a new award to specifically honor the outstanding work of a person with local ties to the region called the John Hartl Pacific Northwest Spotlight Award. The award is named in honor of John Hartl, the late Seattle Times film critic whose legacy remains "a beacon in the region and beyond when it comes to writing about film". The SFCS Board will present the award annually to acknowledge an exceptional body of work, rather than a single film or performance, that represents the Pacific Northwest. This year, the inaugural award was presented to Lily Gladstone.

== Winners and nominees ==
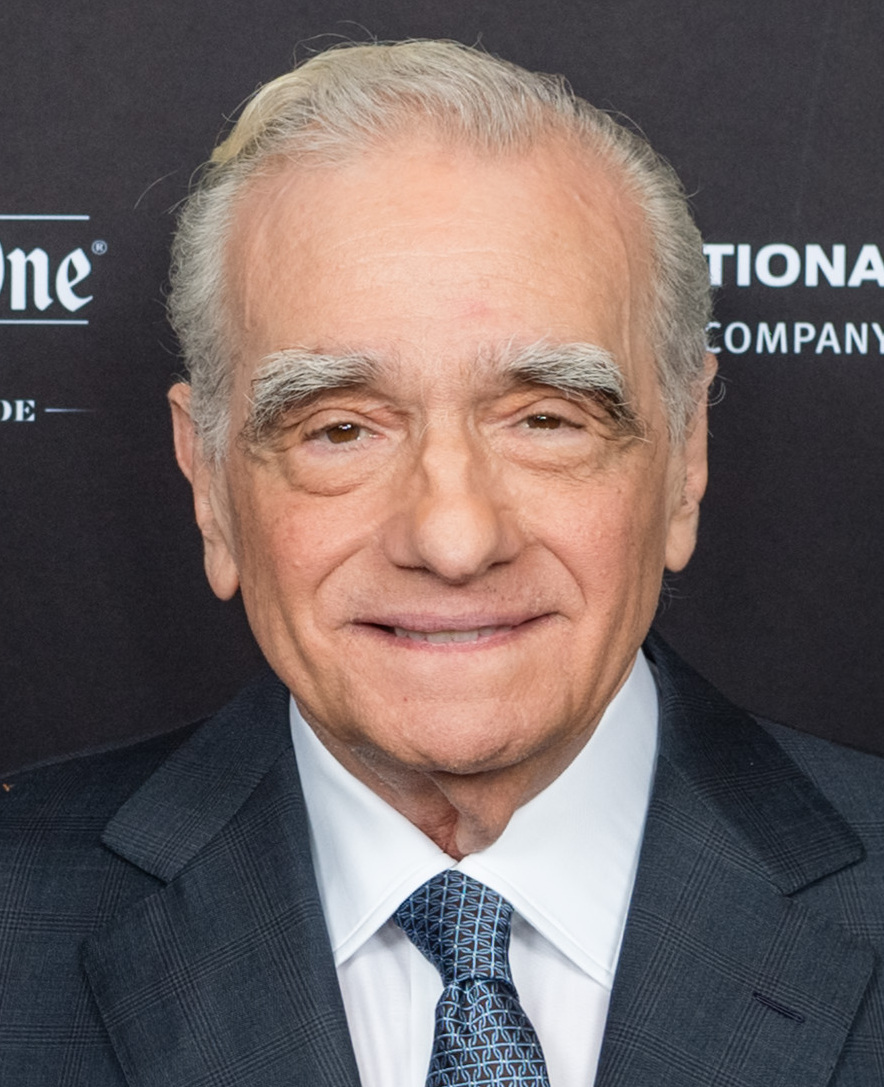
Martin Scorsese, Best Director winner

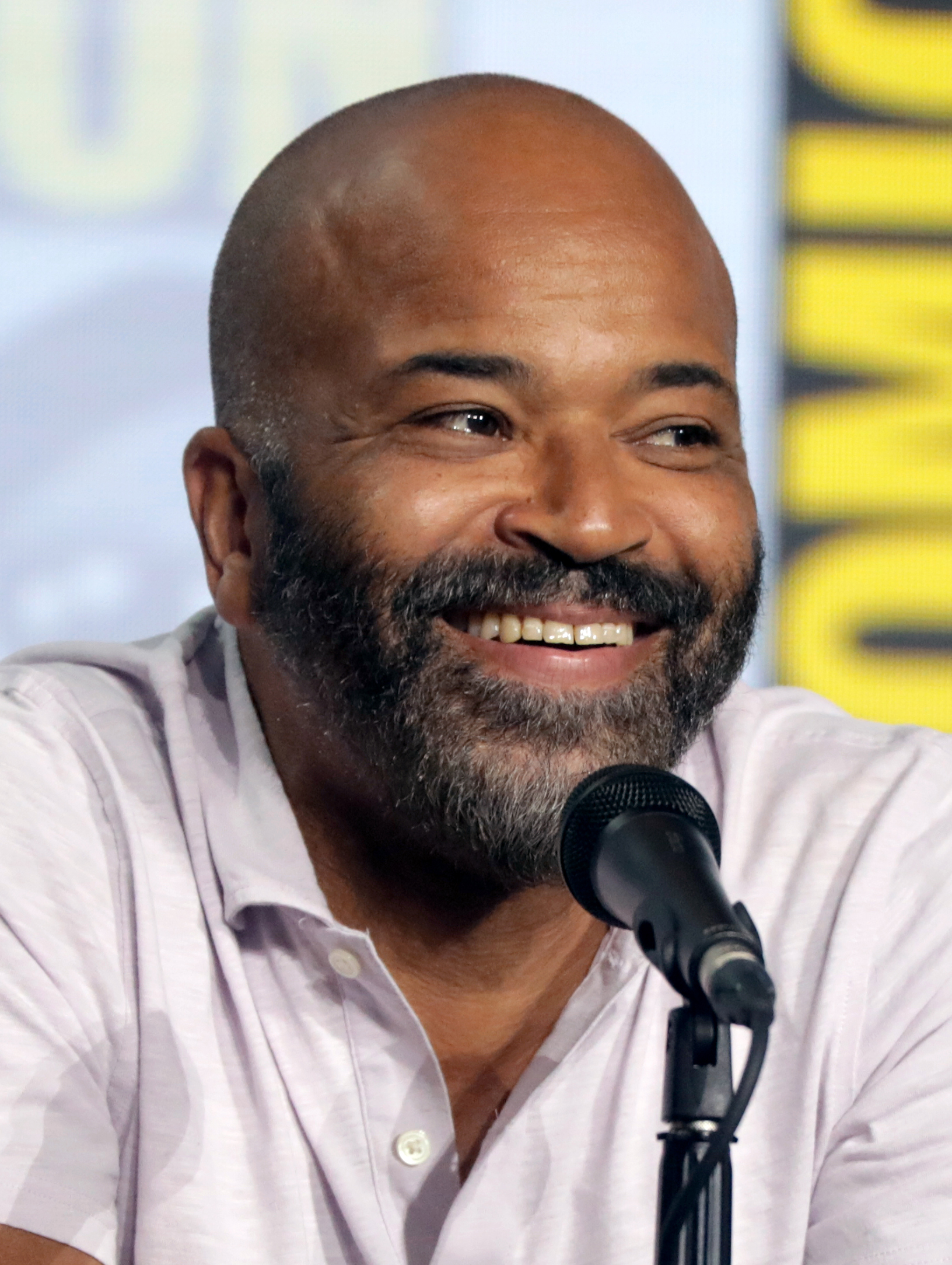
Jeffrey Wright, Best Actor in a Leading Role winner

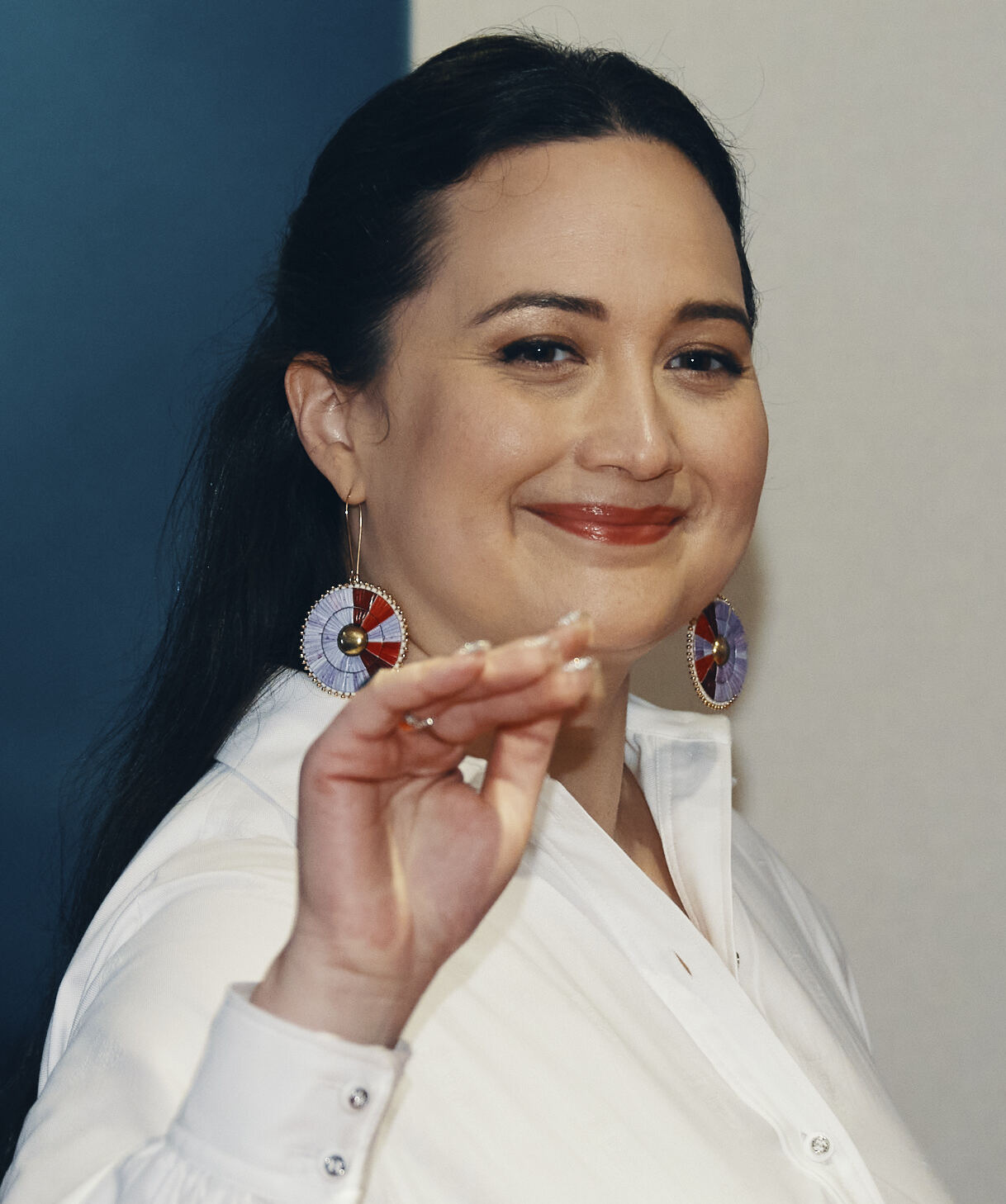
Lily Gladstone, Best Actress in a Leading Role winner and John Hartl Pacific Northwest Spotlight Award recipient

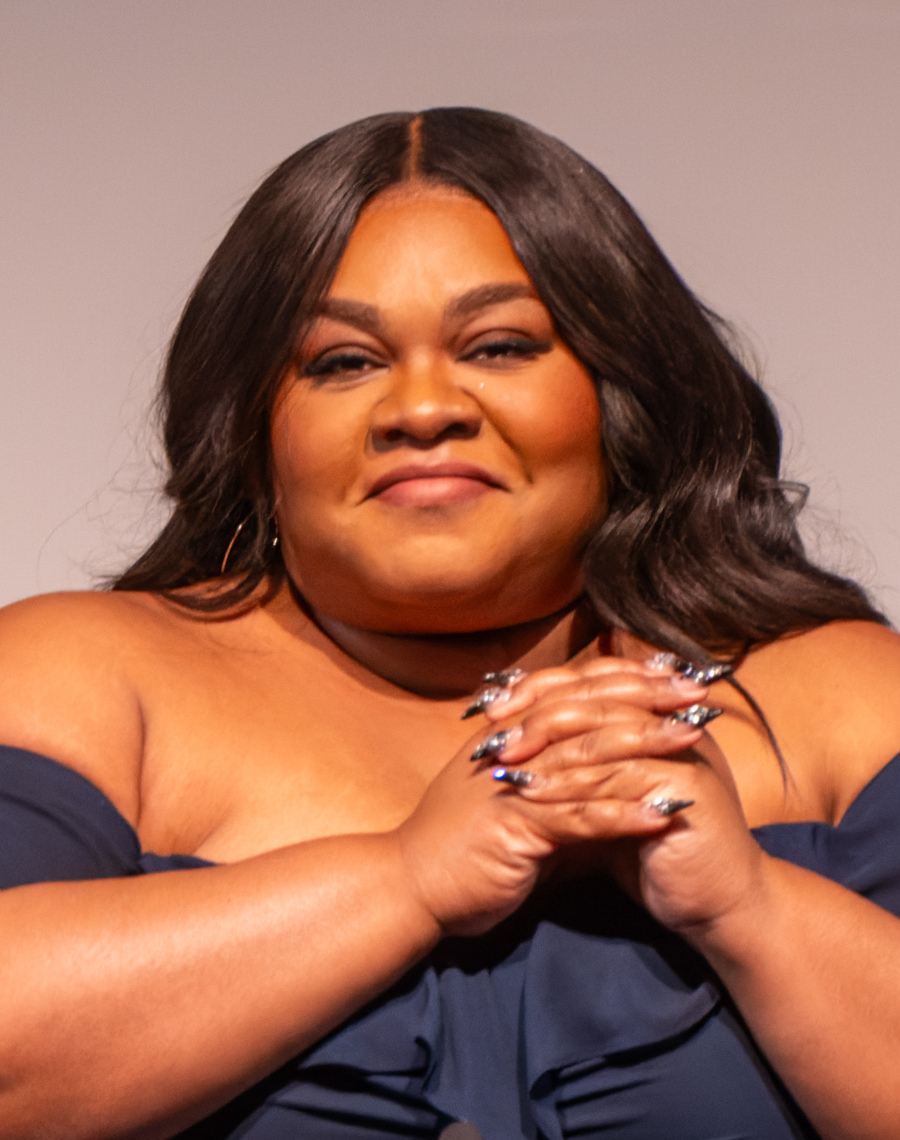
Da'Vine Joy Randolph, Best Actress in a Supporting Role winner

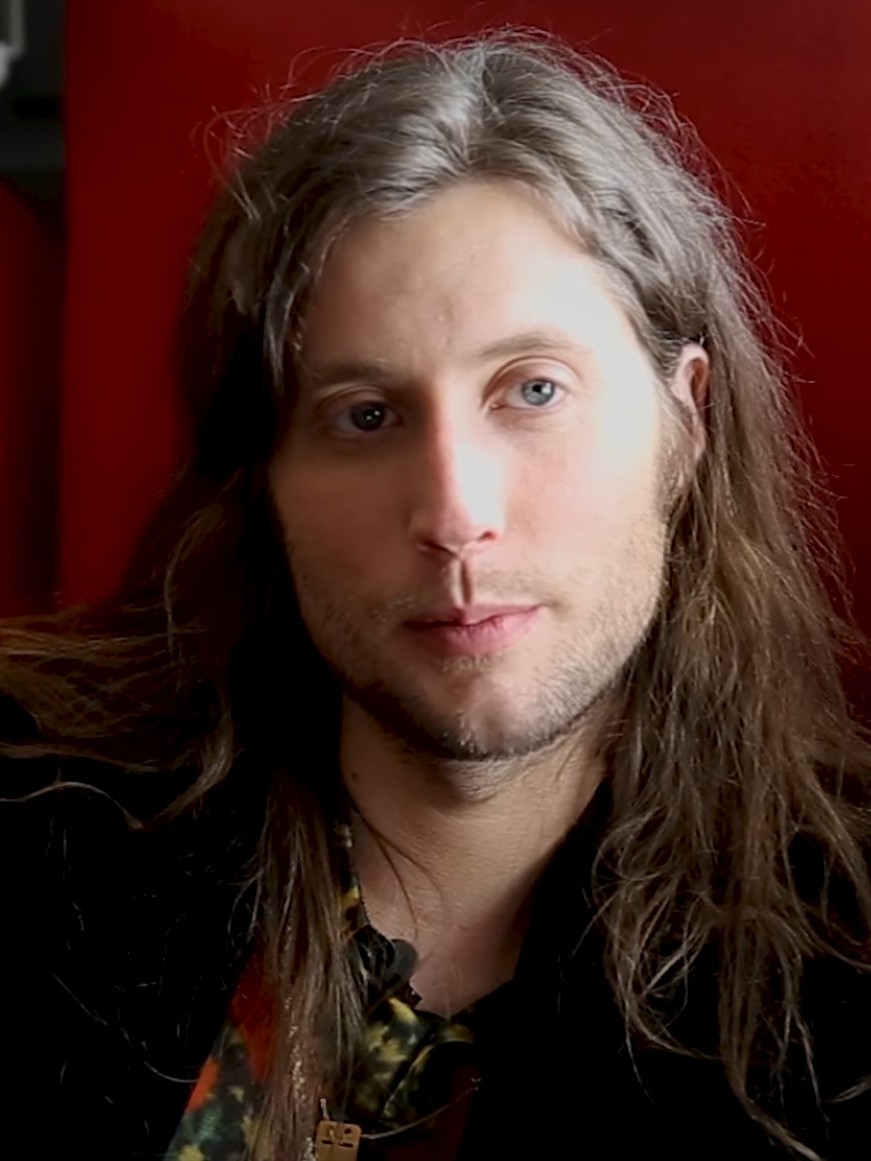
Ludwig Göransson, Best Original Score winner

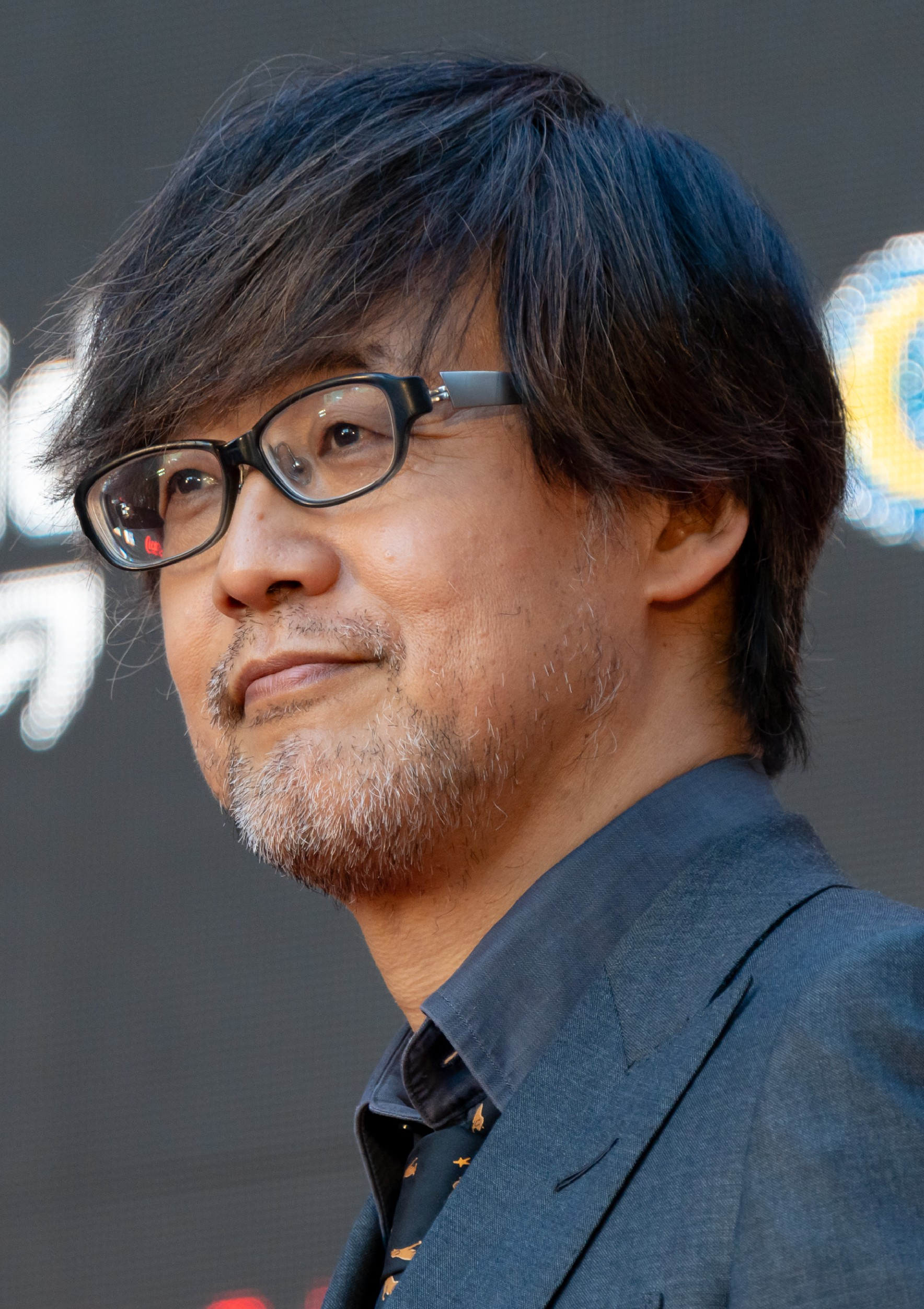
Takashi Yamazaki, Best Visual Effects co-winner

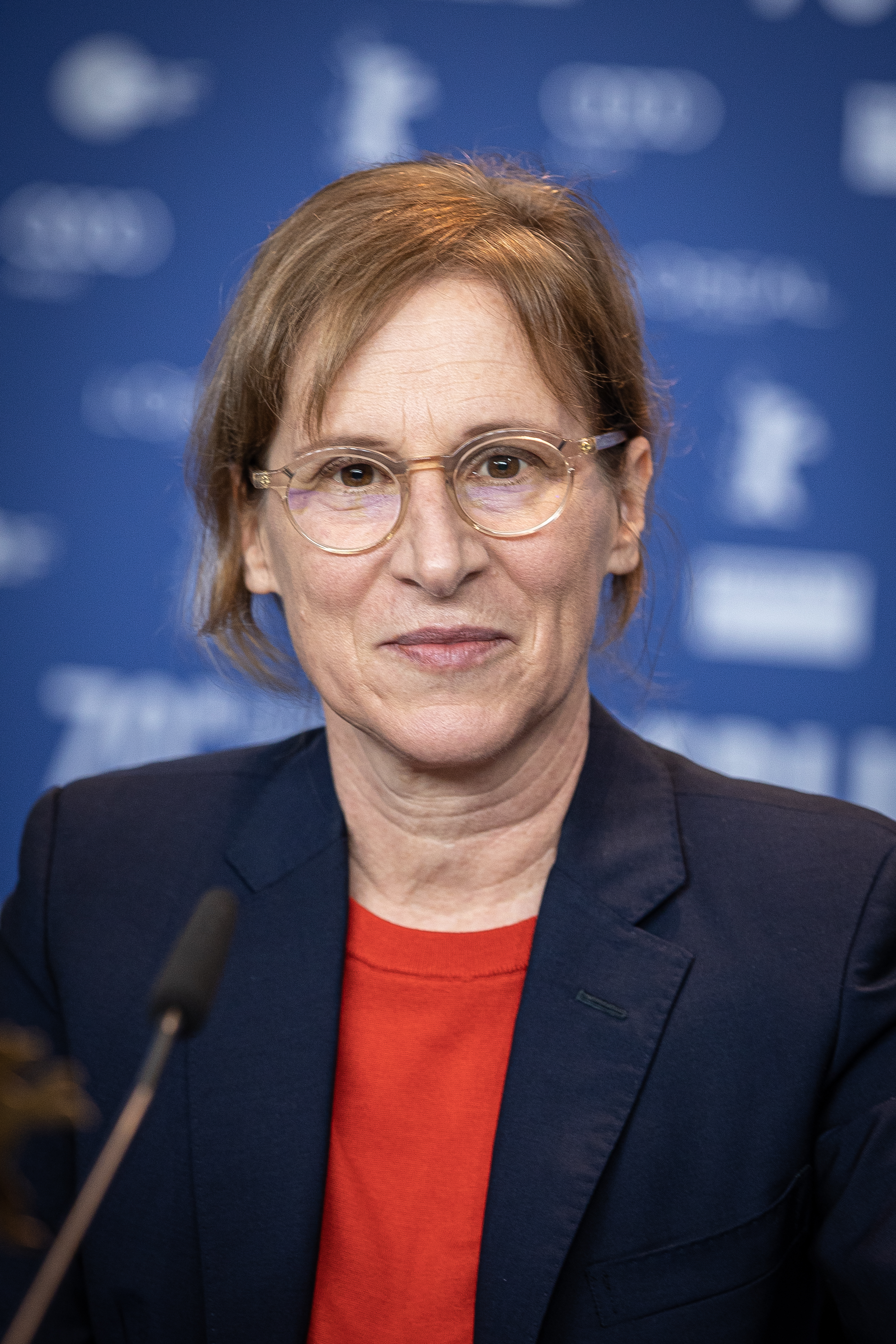
Kelly Reichardt, Achievement in Pacific Northwest Filmmaking winner

Winners are listed first and highlighted in bold

**Best Picture of the Year** **Past Lives (A24)**: American Fiction (Amazon MGM Studios); Barbie (Warner Bros. Pictures); The Holdovers (Focus Features); Killers of the Flower Moon (Apple TV+ / Paramount Pictures); May December (Netflix); Oppenheimer (Universal Pictures); Poor Things (Searchlight Pictures); Spider-Man: Across the Spider-Verse (Sony Pictures Releasing); The Zone of Interest (A24)	**Best Director** **Martin Scorsese – Killers of the Flower Moon**: Greta Gerwig – Barbie; Yorgos Lanthimos – Poor Things; Christopher Nolan – Oppenheimer; Celine Song – Past Lives
**Best Actor in a Leading Role** **Jeffrey Wright – American Fiction as Thelonious "Monk" Ellison**: Paul Giamatti – The Holdovers as Paul Dunham; Cillian Murphy – Oppenheimer as J. Robert Oppenheimer; Andrew Scott – All of Us Strangers as Adam; Koji Yakusho – Perfect Days as Hirayama	**Best Actress in a Leading Role** **Lily Gladstone – Killers of the Flower Moon as Mollie Burkhart**: Sandra Hüller – Anatomy of a Fall as Sandra Voyter; Greta Lee – Past Lives; Margot Robbie – Barbie as Barbie; Emma Stone – Poor Things as Bella Baxter
**Best Actor in a Supporting Role** **Charles Melton – May December as Joe Yoo**: Sterling K. Brown – American Fiction as Clifford "Cliff" Ellison; Robert De Niro – Killers of the Flower Moon as William King Hale; Ryan Gosling – Barbie as Ken; Mark Ruffalo – Poor Things as Duncan Wedderburn	**Best Actress in a Supporting Role** **Da'Vine Joy Randolph – The Holdovers as Mary Lamb**: Danielle Brooks – The Color Purple as Sofia; Penélope Cruz – Ferrari as Laura Ferrari; Sandra Hüller – The Zone of Interest as Hedwig Höss; Rachel McAdams – Are You There God? It's Me, Margaret. as Barbara Simon
**Best Ensemble Cast** **The Holdovers**: Asteroid City; Barbie; Killers of the Flower Moon; Oppenheimer	**Best Action Choreography** **John Wick: Chapter 4**: Godzilla Minus One; The Iron Claw; Mission: Impossible – Dead Reckoning Part One; Sisu
**Best Screenplay** **The Holdovers – David Hemingson**: American Fiction – Cord Jefferson; May December – Samy Burch; Past Lives – Celine Song; Poor Things – Tony McNamara	**Best Animated Feature** **Spider-Man: Across the Spider-Verse**: The Boy and the Heron; Nimona; Suzume; Teenage Mutant Ninja Turtles: Mutant Mayhem
**Best Documentary Feature** **20 Days in Mariupol**: Beyond Utopia; Even Hell Has Its Heroes; Menus-Plaisirs – Les Troisgros; Still: A Michael J. Fox Movie	**Best International Film** **Godzilla Minus One**: Anatomy of a Fall; The Boy and the Heron; Monster; The Zone of Interest
**Best Cinematography** **Poor Things – Robbie Ryan**: The Creator – Greig Fraser and Oren Soffer; Killers of the Flower Moon – Rodrigo Prieto; Oppenheimer – Hoyte van Hoytema; The Zone of Interest – Łukasz Żal	**Best Costume Design** **Barbie – Jacqueline Durran**: Killers of the Flower Moon – Jacqueline West; Napoleon – Janty Yates and David Crossman; Poor Things – Holly Waddington; Priscilla – Stacey Battat
**Best Film Editing** **Oppenheimer – Jennifer Lame**: Killers of the Flower Moon – Thelma Schoonmaker; Past Lives – Keith Fraase; Poor Things – Yorgos Mavropsaridis; Spider-Man: Across the Spider-Verse – Michael Andrews	**Best Original Score** **Oppenheimer – Ludwig Göransson**: Killers of the Flower Moon – Robbie Robertson (posthumous); Poor Things – Jerskin Fendrix; Spider-Man: Across the Spider-Verse – Daniel Pemberton; The Zone of Interest – Mica Levi
**Best Production Design** **Barbie – Sarah Greenwood and Katie Spencer**: Killers of the Flower Moon – Jack Fisk; Oppenheimer – Ruth De Jong and Claire Kaufman; Poor Things – Shona Heath and James Price; Wonka – Nathan Crowley and Lee Sandales	**Best Visual Effects** **Godzilla Minus One – Kiyoko Shibuya and Takashi Yamazaki**: The Creator – Jay Cooper, Ian Comley, Neil Corbould, and Andrew Roberts; Guardians of the Galaxy Vol. 3 – Stéphane Ceretti, Dan Sudick, Alexis Wajsbrot, and Guy Williams; Oppenheimer – Dave Drzewiecki, Scott R. Fisher, Andrew Jackson, and Giacomo Mineo; Poor Things – Simon Hughes
**Best Youth Performance** **Milo Machado-Graner – Anatomy of a Fall as Daniel Maleski**: Amie Donald – M3GAN as M3GAN; Abby Ryder Fortson – Are You There God? It's Me, Margaret. as Margaret Simon; Ariana Greenblatt – Barbie as Sasha; Sōya Kurokawa – Monster as Minato Mugino	**Villain of the Year** **Godzilla – Godzilla Minus One**: Gabi Bauer – Infinity Pool (portrayed by Mia Goth); M3GAN – M3GAN (portrayed by Jenna Davis and Amie Donald); The Patriarchy – Barbie (as represented by the Kens); William "King" Hale – Killers of the Flower Moon (portrayed by Robert De Niro)
**Achievement in Pacific Northwest Filmmaking** **Showing Up – Kelly Reichardt**: Dreamin' Wild – Bill Pohlad; Even Hell Has Its Heroes – Clyde Petersen; Fantasy A Gets a Mattress – David Norman Lewis and Noah Zoltan Sofian; Richland – Irene Lusztig
