= The Creator (2023 film) =

Sci-fi film by Gareth Edwards

- Theatrical release poster
- Directed by: Gareth Edwards
- Screenplay by: Gareth Edwards; Chris Weitz
- Story by: Gareth Edwards
- Produced by: Gareth Edwards; Kiri Hart; Jim Spencer; Arnon Milchan
- Starring: John David Washington; Gemma Chan; Ken Watanabe; Sturgill Simpson; Allison Janney
- Cinematography: Greig Fraser; Oren Soffer
- Edited by: Hank Corwin; Joe Walker; Scott Morris
- Music by: Hans Zimmer
- Production companies: Regency Enterprises; Entertainment One; New Regency; Bad Dreams
- Distributed by: 20th Century Studios
- Release date: September 29, 2023
- Running time: 133 minutes
- Country: United States
- Language: English
- Budget: $80 million
- Box office: $104.3 million

The Creator is a 2023 American science fiction action film produced and directed by Gareth Edwards, who co-wrote the screenplay with Chris Weitz. It stars John David Washington, Gemma Chan, Ken Watanabe, Sturgill Simpson, and Allison Janney. Set in 2070, 15 years after artificial intelligence (AI) set off a nuclear detonation in Los Angeles, which started a war of humans against AI, a former special forces agent is recruited to hunt down and kill the "Creator", who has developed a mysterious weapon with the power to end the war.

Development began in November 2019 when Edwards signed on to direct and write the project for New Regency and was officially announced in February 2020. Washington was hired in May 2021, and the rest of the cast joined over the next year. Filming began in January 2022 in Thailand with an $80 million production budget, and wrapped that May.

The Creator was released in North America on September 29, 2023, by 20th Century Studios. The film grossed $104.3 million worldwide and received generally positive reviews from critics. It earned two nominations at the 96th Academy Awards, for Best Visual Effects and Best Sound, and was nominated for Best Science Fiction Film and Best Film Visual / Special Effects at the 51st Saturn Awards.

== Plot ==
In 2055, an artificial intelligence created by the U.S. government detonates a nuclear warhead over Los Angeles, California. In response, most of the Western world pledges to eradicate AI to prevent humanity's extinction. Their efforts are resisted by New Asia, a region comprising East, South and Southeast Asia, whose people continue to embrace AI. The U.S. military aims to assassinate "Nirmata", (Note: An intertitle states that nirmātā (Devanagari: निर्माता) is Nepalese for "the Creator".) the chief architect behind New Asia's AI advancements, using the USS NOMAD (North American Orbital Mobile Aerospace Defense), a space station capable of launching destructive attacks from orbit.

In 2065, U.S. Army Sergeant Joshua Taylor is undercover in New Asia with his pregnant wife Maya, believed to be the daughter of Nirmata. Taylor is exposed when their home is attacked by U.S. military forces, and Maya is presumed dead after a NOMAD strike. Five years later, Taylor, now part of the ground zero cleanup crew, is recruited by General Andrews and Colonel Howell for a mission against "Alpha O", a new weapon developed by Nirmata that could destroy NOMAD. Shown evidence of Maya's survival, Taylor agrees. Infiltrating a compound in New Asia, Taylor finds the weapon is a robotic "simulant" in the form of a young girl who has the ability to control technology. Dubbing her "Alphie", Taylor disobeys Howell and seeks out his ex-commander, Drew.

Drew declares Alphie could be humanity's most powerful weapon. An attack by New Asia police attempting to recover Alphie kills Drew's simulant girlfriend and leaves Drew fatally wounded; before he dies, Drew confesses to Taylor that the reason the military attacked Taylor's home five years ago is because they learned Maya is Nirmata, and they have been keeping it a secret from him ever since. Taylor and Alphie are captured by New Asian forces led by Harun, a simulant soldier and former ally of Taylor's during his time undercover. Harun states that the detonation in Los Angeles was a human error blamed on AI, who only wish to peacefully co-exist with humanity. After escaping his captors, Taylor rescues Alphie as Howell launches an attack on the village. Taylor learns that Maya is alive, but has been in a coma ever since the attack, being kept on life support by simulants. Since simulants cannot harm Nirmata, she is "stranded" and unable to die. As Taylor takes Maya off life support, U.S. forces led by Howell arrive. Howell attempts to extract Maya’s consciousness but is killed by Harun during the process. Harun tells Taylor NOMAD must be destroyed for the war to end. Taylor grabs the memory drive that contains Maya’s consciousness before they escape.

Captured again, Taylor is coerced into killing Alphie with an EMP weapon. However, Andrews later discovers this to be a ruse, allowing the pair to escape. Boarding a lunar shuttle at the Los Angeles Interplanetary Air and Space Port, Alphie forces the spacecraft to dock aboard NOMAD as Andrews orders a large-scale assault on remaining AI bases. Taylor plants explosives; ejects Alphie by escape pod when Andrews activates a robot that prevents him from fleeing; and reunites with a simulant bearing Maya's likeness, activated by Alphie with Maya's memories from the drive that Taylor gave to her as a necklace. They embrace as NOMAD explodes, killing Taylor, destroying Maya, and shutting down the missile guidance system, saving most of the targeted AI bases across New Asia. Arriving on Earth, Alphie is welcomed by the AI population as a new "Nirmata".

== Cast ==
- John David Washington as Sergeant Joshua Taylor, a military sergeant and undercover operative of the U.S. Army. He has an artificial right arm and right leg due to injuries he suffered during the nuclear explosion in Los Angeles, along with losing his parents and brother.
- Madeleine Yuna Voyles as Alpha-O / "Alphie", a robotic A.I. simulant with the ability to remotely control technology.
- Gemma Chan as Maya Fey, Joshua's wife. Chan also portrays multiple A.I. simulants with the appearance of Maya.
- Allison Janney as Colonel Howell, a colonel in the U.S. Army who recruits Joshua. She harbors a deep prejudice against AIs due to losing both her sons in the war, one of whom was tortured by insurgents after being tricked by a simulant who seduced him.
- Ken Watanabe as Harun, an A.I. simulant soldier in New Asia and a former enemy of Joshua’s.
- Sturgill Simpson as Drew, Joshua's former comrade and best friend.
- Amar Chadha-Patel as Omni / Sek-on / Sergeant Bui, a citizen of New Asia who has donated his likeness to multiple simulants.
- Marc Menchaca as McBride, a soldier in the U.S. Army who is part of Joshua's squad.
- Robbie Tann as Shipley, a soldier in the U.S. Army who is part of Joshua's squad.
- Ralph Ineson as General Andrews, a general in the U.S. Army who recruits Joshua.
- Michael Esper as Cotton, the captain of Joshua's squad.
- Veronica Ngo as Kami, Drew's A.I. simulant girlfriend.
- Mackenzie Lansing as Harrison

== Production ==
=== Development ===
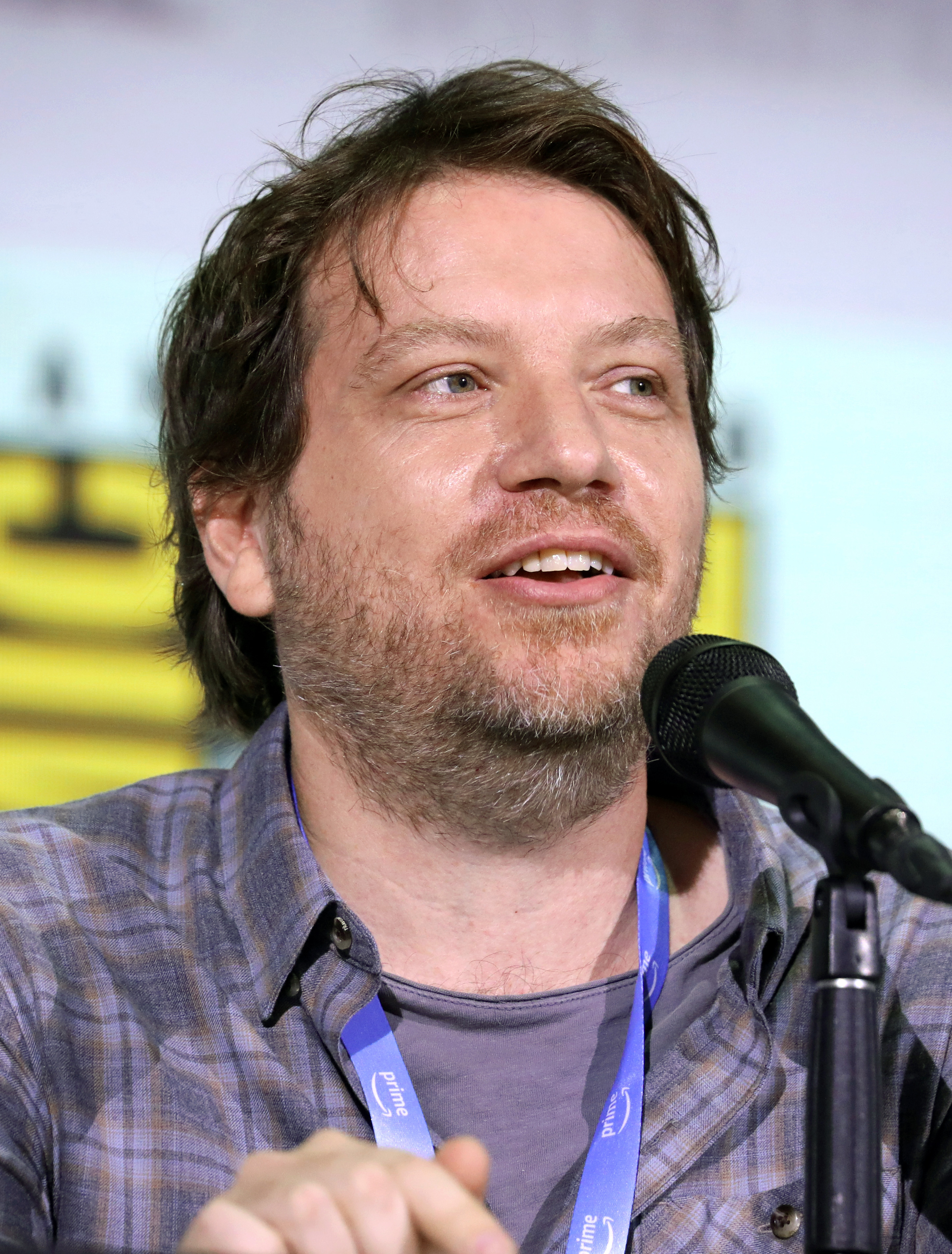
Director, co-producer and co-writer Gareth Edwards (left) and co-writer Chris Weitz (right)

Development on the film began in November 2019, when Gareth Edwards signed to direct and write an untitled science fiction project for New Regency, with Edwards' Rogue One: A Star Wars Story (2016) co-producer Kiri Hart as producer. A test shoot and location scouting was conducted that year, with Edwards using it as the opportunity to envision the film's look: "I took a camera and a 1970s anamorphic lens, we went location-scouting in Vietnam, Cambodia, Japan, Indonesia, Thailand, and Nepal. Our whole plan was just to go to the greatest locations in the world, because the cost of a flight is way less than the cost of building a set. We were going to hopscotch around the world and shoot this film, then layer in the science-fiction on top afterwards. If our film is trying to achieve something visually, it's trying to feel real in terms of science-fiction."

In February 2020, Edwards was officially announced as director. He cited films such as Apocalypse Now (1979), Baraka (1992), Blade Runner (1982), Akira (1988), Rain Man (1988), The Hit (1984), E.T. the Extra-Terrestrial (1982) and Paper Moon (1973) as sources of inspiration. The battle sequences in Saving Private Ryan (1998) were also cited as an influence on the film.

=== Casting ===
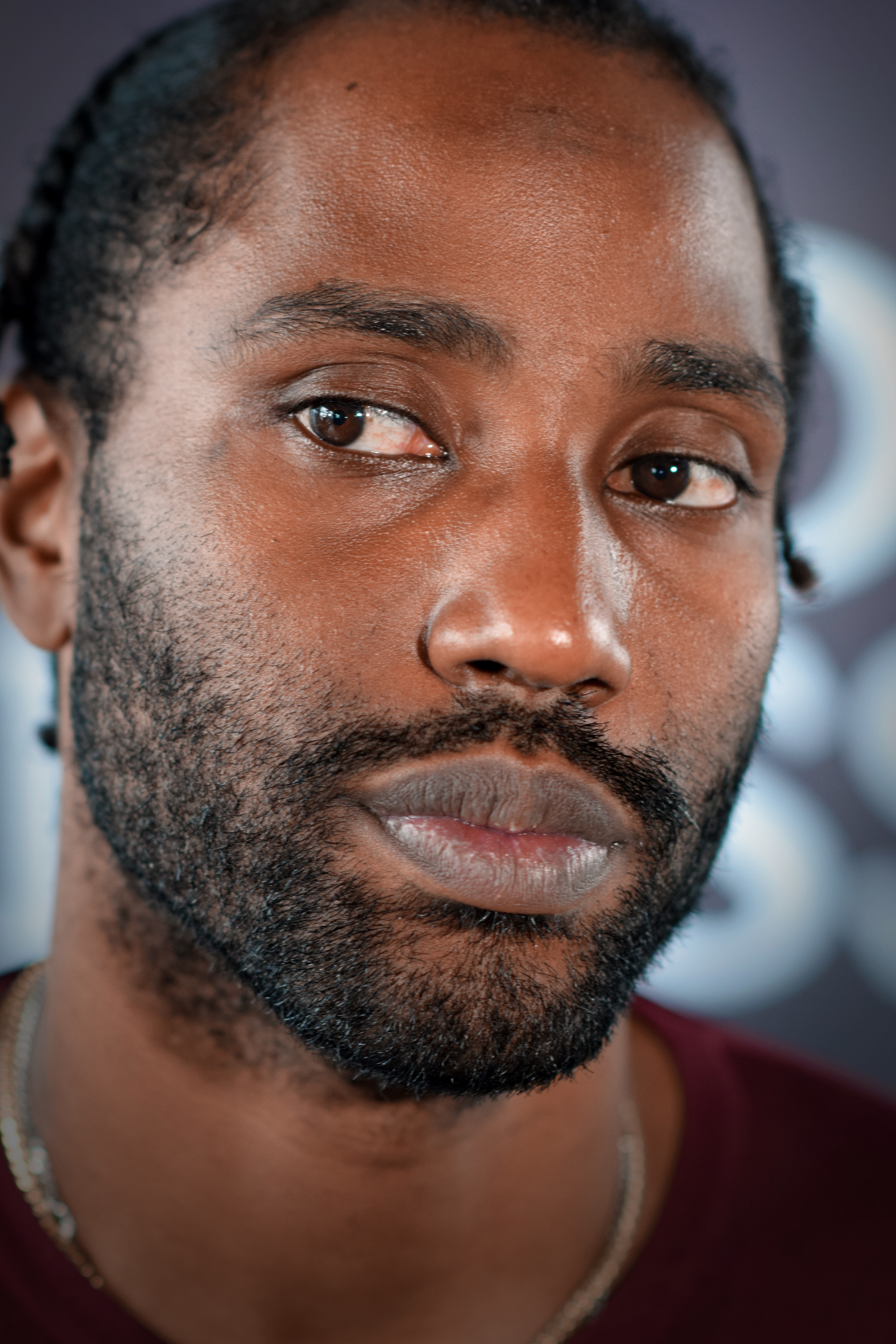
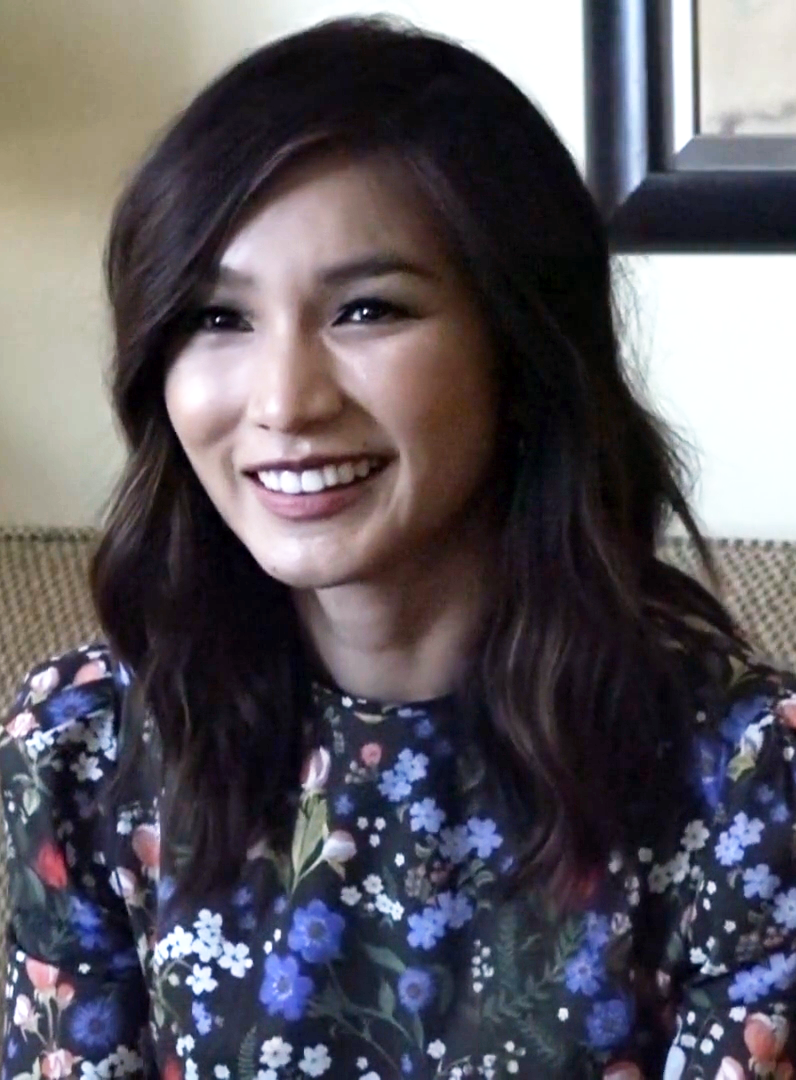
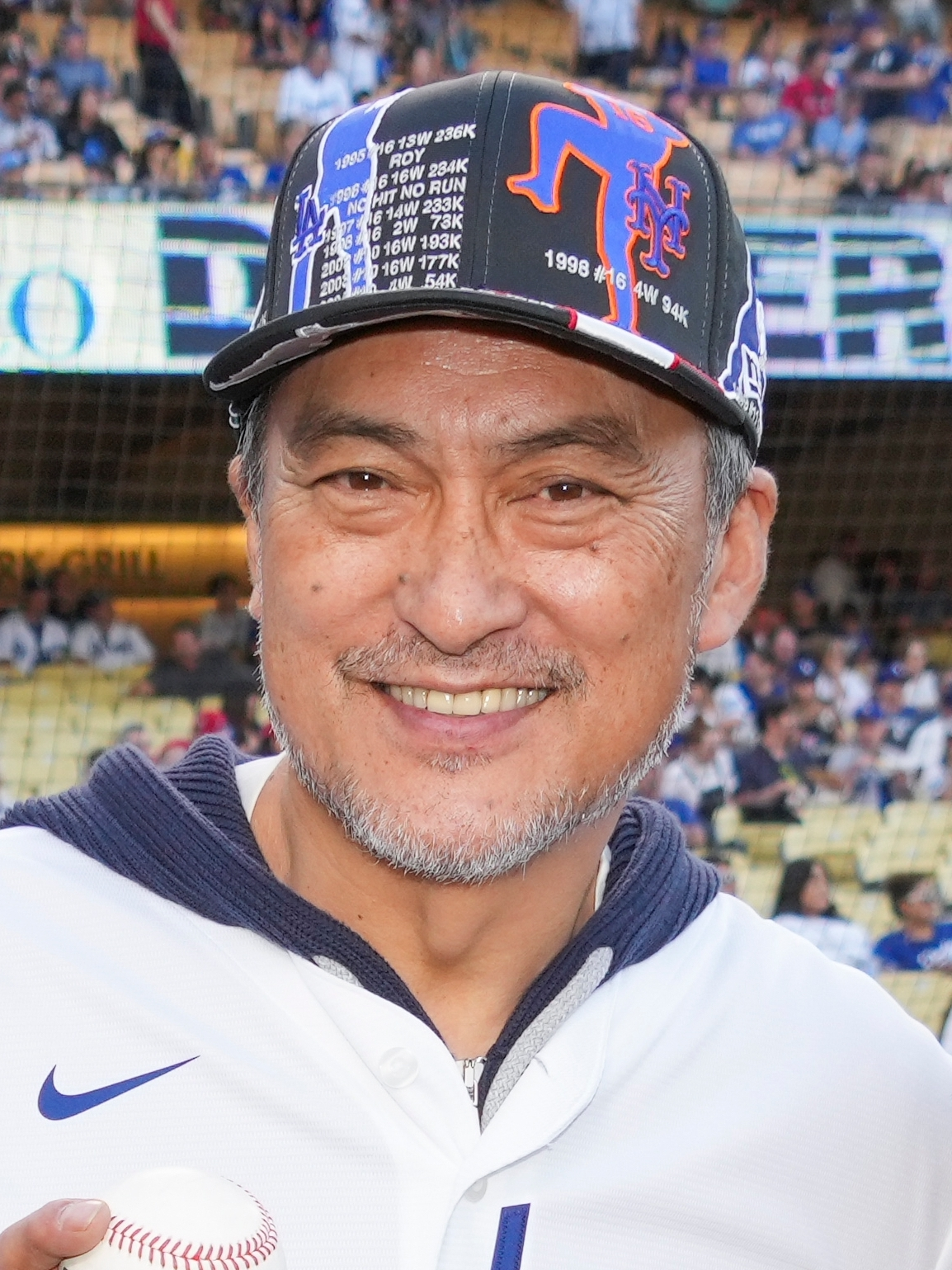
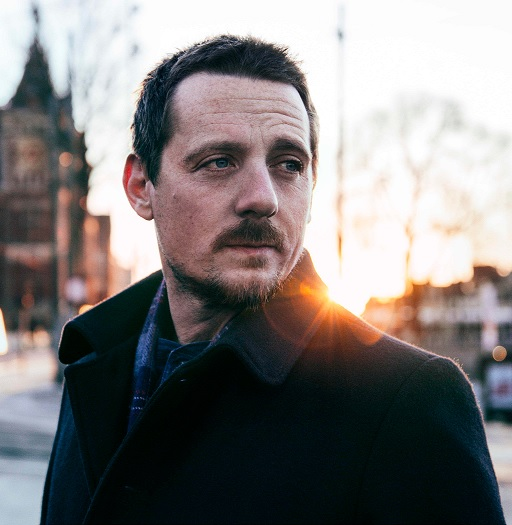
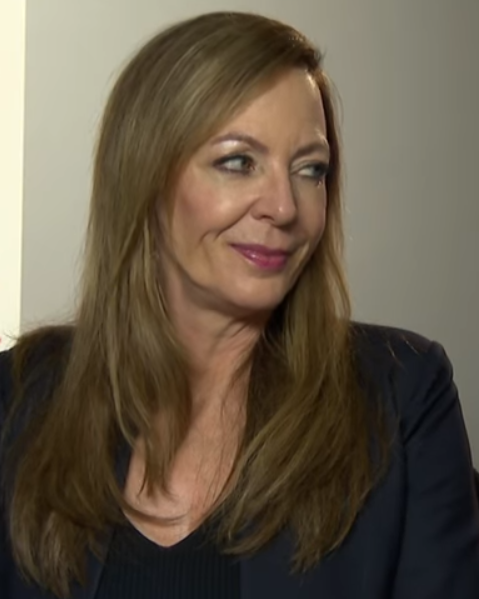
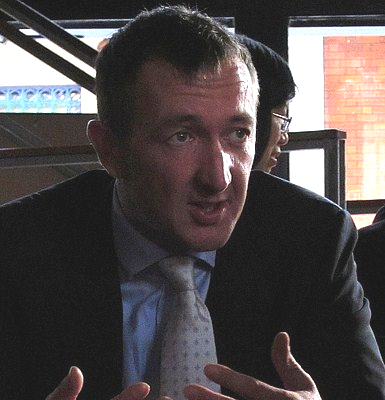
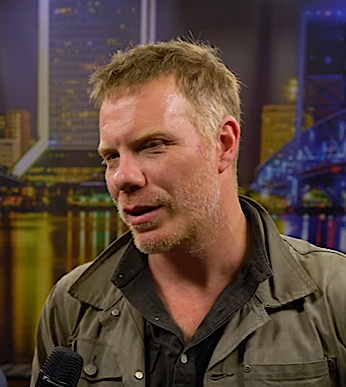
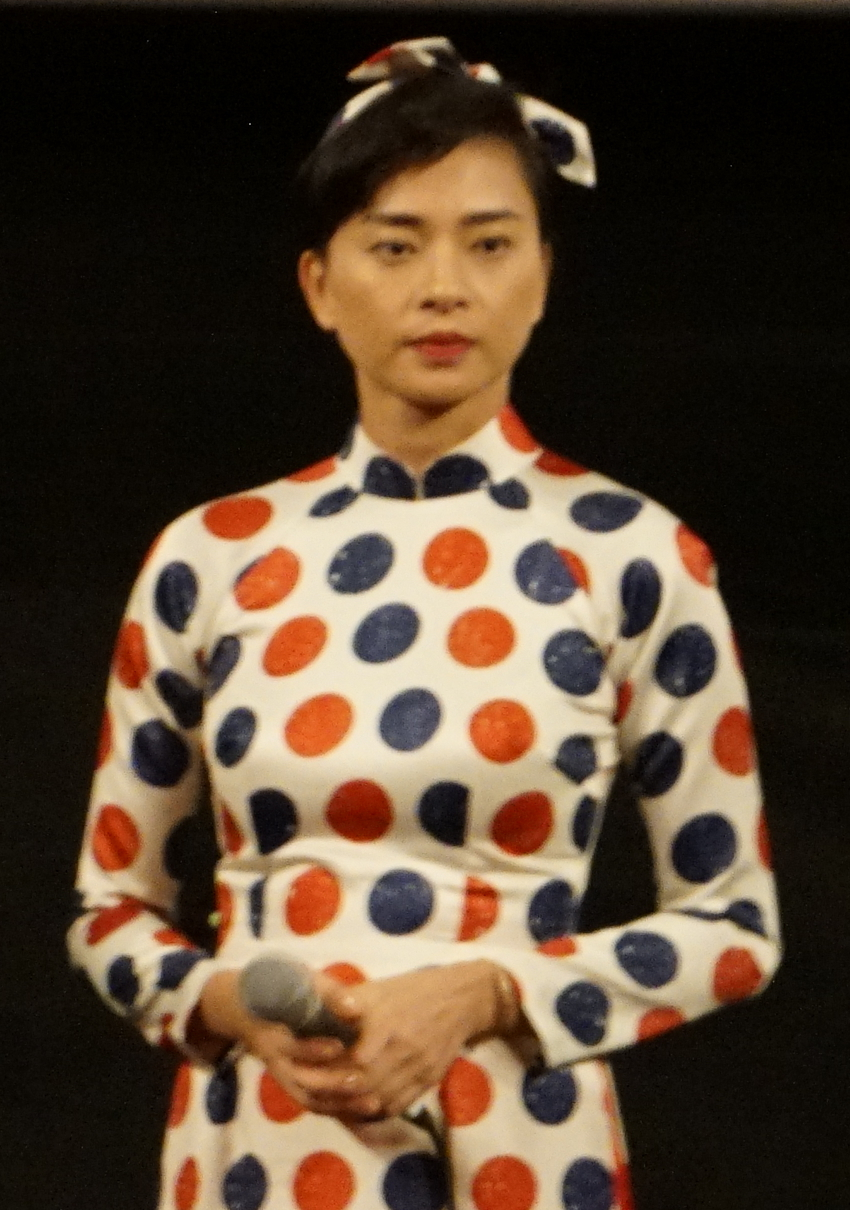
- Top row: (left to right) John David Washington, Gemma Chan, Ken Watanabe and Sturgill Simpson
- Bottom row: (left to right) Allison Janney, Ralph Ineson, Marc Menchaca and Veronica Ngo

In May 2021, John David Washington was announced to star, and the film's working title was revealed to be True Love. In June 2021, Gemma Chan, Danny McBride, and Benedict Wong entered negotiations to star. The involvements of Chan and Wong were confirmed in January 2022, with Allison Janney, Sturgill Simpson, and Marc Menchaca joining the cast. Simpson was reported to be taking over for McBride who departed due to scheduling conflicts. In February 2022, Ken Watanabe joined the cast to replace Wong, who also had to drop out due to scheduling conflicts; Watanabe had previously worked with Edwards on Godzilla (2014). Madeleine Yuna Voyles' performance received critical acclaim and was nominated for several awards.

=== Filming ===
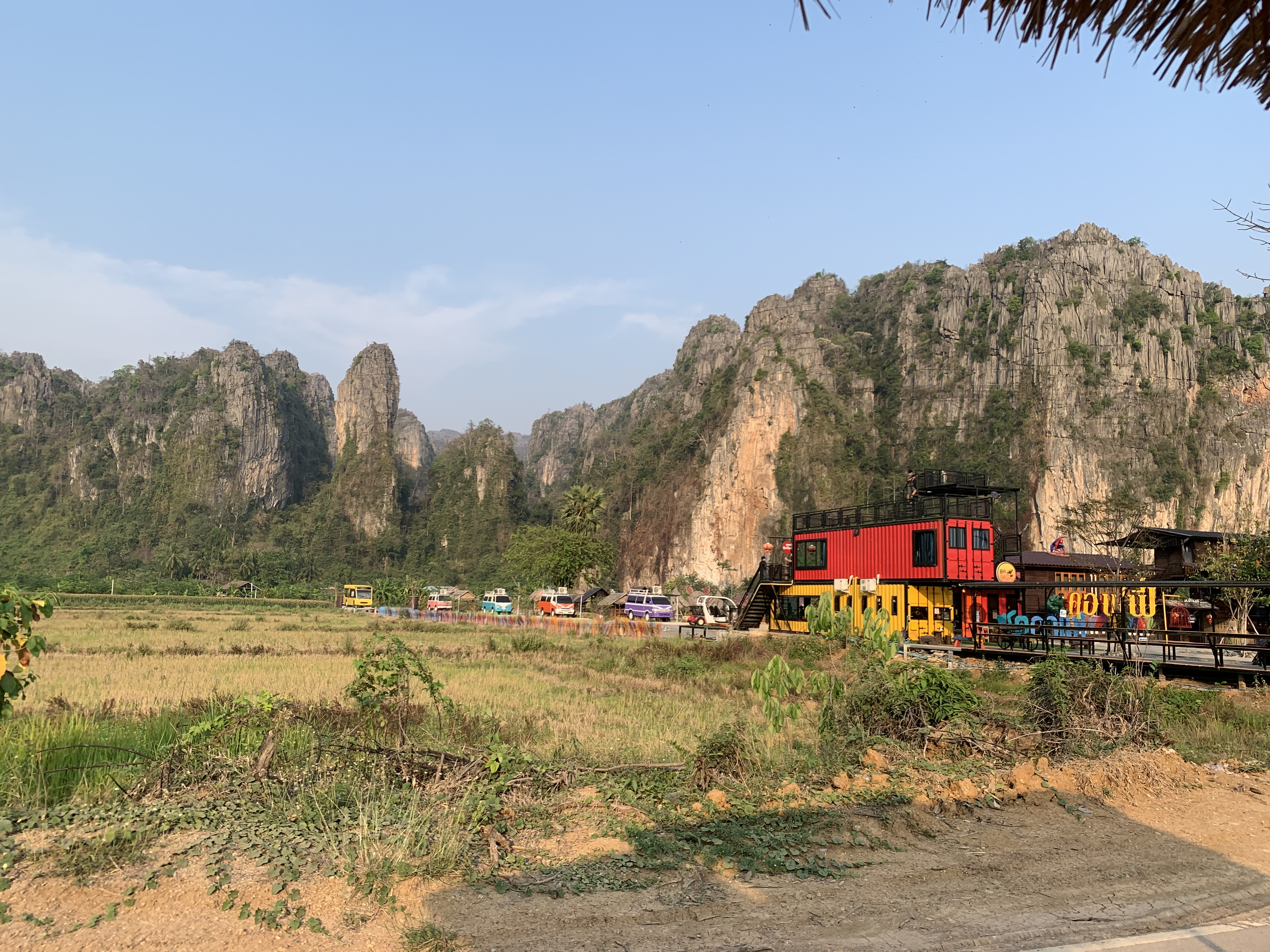
The film backdrop features landforms of Ban Mung, Thailand

On a production budget of $80 million, principal photography began in Thailand on January 17, 2022, with Greig Fraser (who was also a co-producer) and Oren Soffer as cinematographers, and COVID-19 safety precautions in place. To give the film the feel of classic Hollywood epics such as Ben-Hur (1959), the filmmakers opted to shoot in the 2.76:1 ultra-wide aspect ratio. Among the on-site filming locations in Thailand were Suvarnabhumi Airport, Ban Mung, Sangkhla Buri, Chiang Dao, and Sam Phan Bok. As the trailer was released, Thai fans also pointed out a scene shot at Makkasan station of Bangkok's ARL.

For their duties, Fraser was involved in the pre-production process before moving to working remotely due to his commitment to Dune: Part Two (2024), while Soffer, for his first major studio film, served as the main director of photography throughout the production shoot. In an interview with Total Film, Edwards, who was also a camera operator, commended Soffer and what he brought to the film, calling him a "real future rising star in the DoP world. He's super-smart. He's got a great eye." The film was shot on the prosumer Sony FX3 camera, the low cost of which is a rarity for a blockbuster film. Edwards confirmed the camera's usage at the "Directors on Directing" panel at the 2023 San Diego Comic-Con, where director and fellow panelist Louis Leterrier noted that this creative decision could "change cinema" forever.

In light of the budget, the filmmakers utilized guerrilla filmmaking methods by having very few crew members and natural lighting on set for select on-location scenes, and limited sound recording. Rather than building sets, or relying exclusively on digital methods such as greenscreens or StageCraft, the production found it was more cost effective to send a small crew to film in 80 locations around the world which came closest to matching the desired sci-fi look. Then, only once the producers had finalised the edit were visual effects layered into the images. Using this method, Edwards estimated the production spent only $80 million on a project which would have typically cost $300 million. Interior scenes and stuntwork was filmed at Pinewood Studios. Filming wrapped on May 30, 2022.

=== Visual effects and post-production ===
The visual effects were provided by Industrial Light & Magic (ILM), SDFX Studios, Yannix, Virtuos, Weta Workshop Folks VFX, MARZ, Misc Studios, Fin Design + Effects, Outpost VFX, Lekker VFX, Crafty Apes, Jellyfish Pictures, Proof, Territory Studio, Atomic Arts and VFX Los Angeles. James Clyne, who was a concept artist on Rogue One, reunited with Edwards on this film as its production designer.

The USS NOMAD is noted as one of the film's most significant elements due to its distinctive visual design and sound effects.

One of the film's most significant elements is the fictional U.S. military space station NOMAD, which was noted for its distinctive visual design and sound effects. Edwards revealed that it took the entirety of the lockdowns caused by the COVID-19 pandemic to design it, describing it as "a bird of prey and an all-seeing eye in the sky, always looking at everybody. So we kept playing with those two shapes and merging them in a way until it just felt right." Ethan Van der Ryn and Erik Aadahl, who worked with Edwards on Godzilla (2014), provided the ship's sound effects, describing them as "a dance, is probably the nice way to say it, between music and sound, and it's never a fight". The assembly cut of the film, which ran for five hours, did not use any temp tracks for the music and just the sound design, which Edwards likened to that of the talkies during the late-1920s. Because of this, it was decided that no music be added to the film throughout the entire editing process in order to get the pacing and story structure right in an efficient manner. Edwards called the experience "super interesting. Part of me thinks that I would do that again, because it puts a lot of pressure on the sound design, but then you're not hiding behind music to save the storytelling."

== Music ==
On July 17, 2023, Edwards confirmed that Hans Zimmer was hired to score the film. On September 19, 2023, Edwards revealed that he initially planned on having a company specialising in AI-generated music replicate Zimmer's style of music. Although the process gave him satisfying results, Edwards instead chose Zimmer to originally score the film. The soundtrack was digitally released by Hollywood Records on September 29, 2023.

== Marketing ==
A first look at the film was shown at CinemaCon on April 26, 2023, with editorial director Anthony D'Alessandro of Deadline Hollywood praising the production design, saying that it made "Blade Runner look like child's play". It was also announced that the title was renamed from True Love to The Creator. Edwards later explained why the title was changed, saying that it "sounded too much like a romantic comedy, and that message would confuse potential audiences who weren't familiar with the film's plot or trailer."

The film's teaser trailer, set to a remix of Aerosmith's "Dream On", premiered online on May 17, 2023. The official trailer was released on July 17, 2023, three days after the beginning of the 2023 SAG-AFTRA strike. James Whitbrook of Gizmodo and EJ Tangonan of JoBlo.com found the move coincidental, given the similarities between the film's premise and SAG-AFTRA's fears of the film studios using artificial intelligence to replicate the likenesses of actors without compensation. Edwards agreed with this take, saying "I have a trick with AI is to get the timing as a sweet spot window where it's before the apocalypse and not after, which I think it's in November—maybe December—and so, I think we got really lucky ... The joke would be that when you write a film, especially a science fiction film, I try to avoid putting a date ... at some point, you have to so, I picked 2070. Now I feel like an idiot because I should've gone for 2023 'cause everything that's been unfolding in the last few months is kind of scary and weird."

Exclusive footage from one of the film's battle sequences and a first listen to some of Zimmer's score were presented at the 2023 San Diego Comic-Con on July 21, 2023. A behind-the-scenes featurette introducing Edwards' vision for the film and featuring interviews with the cast was released on August 21, 2023. An IMAX fan event showcasing exclusive footage from the film with a live Q&A with Edwards took place in select IMAX theaters nationwide on August 29, 2023, one month before the film's release.

Publicity stunts were also conducted in September 2023 when actors dressed as "AI robots" depicted in the film appeared during a National Football League game between the Los Angeles Chargers and the Miami Dolphins at SoFi Stadium in Inglewood, California, a Major League Baseball game between the San Diego Padres and the St. Louis Cardinals at Petco Park in San Diego, and the first race of the Autotrader EchoPark Automotive 400 at Texas Motor Speedway in Fort Worth, Texas. A book showcasing concept artwork and a behind-the-scenes look at the making of the film, written by James Mottram, was published by Insight Editions and released by Simon & Schuster on November 14, 2023.

=== Controversy ===
The film's trailer (top) was criticized for using footage of the 2020 Beirut explosion (bottom) as a visual effects plate shot

On July 17, 2023, the official trailer for The Creator received negative criticism for using footage from the 2020 Beirut explosion as a visual effects plate shot of a futuristic Los Angeles being obliterated by a nuclear explosion. It was first noticed by a Reddit user and was subsequently covered by the YouTube channel Corridor Crew as part of their "VFX Artists React" series.

On September 15, 2023, during a Reddit AMA with Gareth Edwards, he revealed that the footage was never meant to be included in the trailer in the first place, and that it is typical in filmmaking that archival footage be used as placeholders for VFX shots, while revealing that the shot is not in the film itself.

== Release ==
=== Theatrical ===
An early press and industry screening of The Creator, originally meant to have been its world premiere until being impacted by the 2023 Hollywood labor disputes, took place at the TCL Chinese Theatre in Los Angeles on September 18, 2023, with props and costumes from the film on display in the lobby. Edwards was also present and voiced his support for the film's cast, who could not attend and promote the film due to the strikes, in a speech before the film began. The film held its Texas premiere at Fantastic Fest on September 26, 2023, with a special screening as the opening night film of Beyond Fest that same day at the Aero Theatre in Santa Monica, California. The film's United Kingdom premiere took place on September 26, 2023, at The Science Museum, South Kensington in London.

It was released on September 29, 2023, in both conventional theaters and in IMAX, Dolby Cinema, 4DX and ScreenX, just two days after the end of the 2023 Writers Guild of America strike. It competed for opening weekend attendance with Paramount Pictures' PAW Patrol: The Mighty Movie and Lionsgate's Saw X. It was originally to be released on October 6, 2023, before it was announced at CinemaCon on April 26, 2023 that it would be moved up a week.

=== Home media ===
The film was released on digital platforms on November 14, 2023, and was released on 4K Ultra HD Blu-ray, Blu-ray and DVD on December 12 by Walt Disney Studios Home Entertainment through the 20th Century Home Entertainment label, featuring a 55-minute featurette titled True Love: Making The Creator. It was made available to stream on Disney+ and Hulu, beginning on December 20, 2023. During its first week on Video on demand (VOD), it ranked number 1 on iTunes Movies and Vudu and number 3 on Google Play.

== Reception ==
=== Box office ===
The Creator grossed $40.8 million in the United States and Canada, and $63.5 million in other territories, for a worldwide total of $104.3 million.

In the United States and Canada, it was released alongside PAW Patrol: The Mighty Movie, Saw X, and the wide expansion of Dumb Money, and was projected to gross $16–19 million from 3,680 theaters in its opening weekend. It made $5.6 million on its first day, including $1.6 million from Thursday night previews. It went on to debut to $14.1 million, finishing third at the box office. $3 million of the gross came from IMAX screens, while men made up at 71% of the audience, with 51% between the ages of 18-34. The film made $6.1 million and $4.3 million in its second and third weekend, finishing fifth both times.

Prior to its release, Cindy White of The A.V. Club cited the mid-teen estimates were due to it being an original film (not based on an existing IP), cast and filmmakers not being entirely household names (save for Washington and Janney), poor timing of the release in the midst of societal and governmental issues regarding generative AI's place in everyday life, and lackluster marketing and promotion due in-part to the ongoing 2023 WGA and SAG-AFTRA strikes. Ben Sherlock of Screen Rant thought being released in the midst of public debates over AI was a positive for the film rather than a negative and attributed the poor performance to its Rotten Tomatoes score and the price of cinema tickets. Following its $14 million opening weekend, Richard Lawson of Vanity Fair expressed hope that the film could become a sleeper hit given its healthier performance overseas, saying: "The film's plotting may be derivative, its twists and emotional beats predictable. But there is still something rare and special in its execution; it's Denis Villeneuve without the cold fussiness, the lacquered preening. Now that Edwards is free of Star Wars (though his Star Wars movie is a good one), he is a filmmaker to be fostered and encouraged, so that he might make ever more arresting entertainments like The Creator."

=== Critical response ===
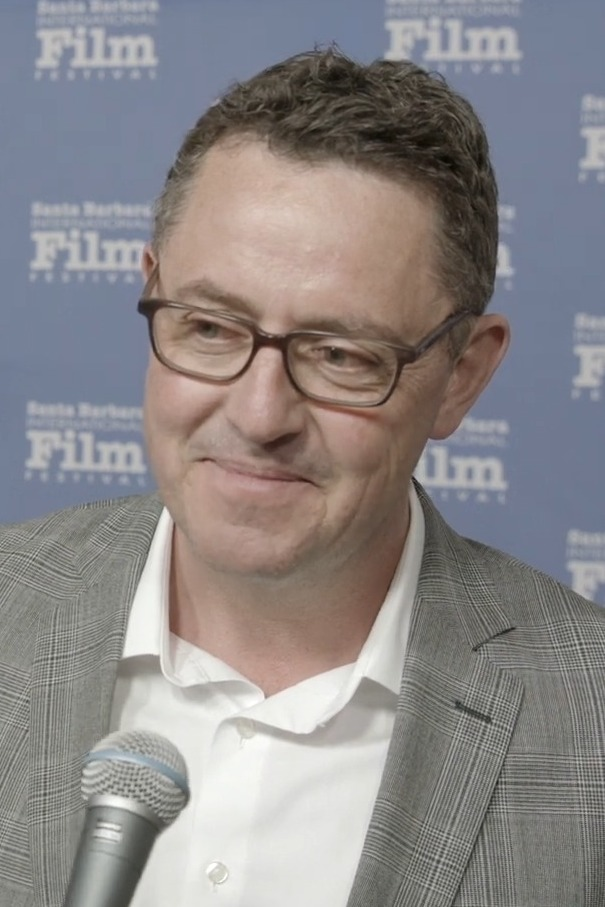
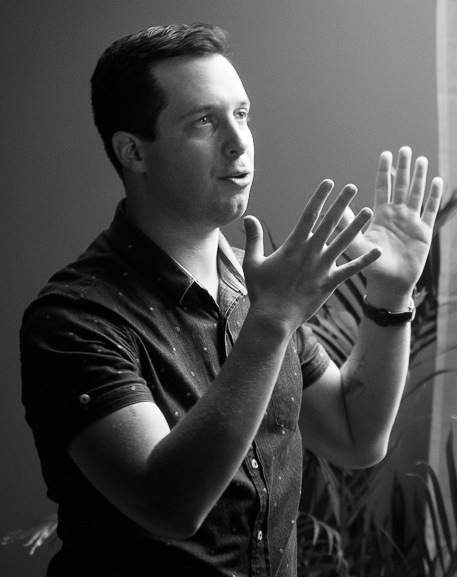
Greig Fraser (left) and Oren Soffer received praise for their work on the film's cinematography and received a nomination for Best Cinematography at the 2023 Seattle Film Critics Society Awards.

The film received mostly positive reviews from critics, who praised its visual effects, cinematography, action sequences and Edwards' direction, but criticized the writing and themes. On the review aggregator website Rotten Tomatoes, 67% of 324 critics' reviews are positive, with an average rating of 6.8/10. The website's consensus reads: "Visually stunning and packed with spectacular set pieces, The Creator serves up timely, well-acted sci-fi that satisfies in the moment even if it lacks substance." Metacritic, which uses a weighted average, assigned the film a score of 63 out of 100, based on 54 critics, indicating "generally favorable" reviews. Audiences surveyed by CinemaScore gave the film an average grade of "B+" on an A+ to F scale, while those polled at PostTrak gave it an 81% overall positive score, with 61% saying they would definitely recommend the film.

Maggie Lovitt of Collider wrote: "The script might have glaring flaws and painfully ambiguous morals, but The Creator is a truly remarkable piece of original science fiction storytelling." Peter Bradshaw of The Guardian called it: "an intriguing, stimulating, exhilarating movie, which really does address – with both head and heart – the great issue of our age, AI." Pete Hammond of Deadline Hollywood called it: "one of the most thought-provoking movies in some time, one to which attention must be paid."

Brian Truitt of USA Today described it as "a movie that makes you think about existence and the world around you, explodes your brain with cool visuals and sufficiently blows stuff up." Alex Godfrey of Empire called it: "An inspired, soulful piece of sci-fi, the endlessly stunning visuals all in service of a heartfelt, sensitive story. Gareth Edwards is the real deal — this is fantastic, enveloping cinema."

A.A. Dowd of IGN wrote: "As pure spectacle, The Creator is often jaw-dropping in its imagery, its relatively frugal special effects, and the detailed depth of its futuristic design. It's shakier as drama and sci-fi..."

Graeme Guttmann of Screen Rant wrote: "While the film's story may feel overstuffed and its action sequences repetitive at times, The Creator's bold vision and willingness to take risks make it a more exhilarating experience than safe, mediocre blockbusters."

Tomris Laffly of TheWrap called it "a film that works better as an allegory for acceptance rather than a warning against AI", and that "even if you can't look past such glaring miscalculations, The Creator will still feel like a visually fulfilling journey that had been worth taking in the aftermath. Nowadays, there is absolutely nothing like it out there."

Joey Magidson of Awards Radar wrote: "You've never seen anything quite like this movie, which is a saying that gets bandied about a lot, but is pretty apt here...There was potential for an instant classic movie. We're not quite there, but what we've got is still damn good," while naming it a frontrunner for the Academy Award for Best Visual Effects.

Jake Cole of Slant praised the visual effects, writing: "The robots, which run a stylistic range from logical extrapolations of present-day models by companies like Boston Dynamics to the not-quite-perfect human simulacra of A.I. Artificial Intelligence, all look not only plausible but physically present." Rodrigo Perez of The Playlist called it "A familiar mélange and pastiche of sci-fi-tropes you've seen and felt before, filmmaker Gareth Edwards' science-fiction drama, The Creator, is recognizable but, nonetheless, largely compelling."

Reviews were not uniformly positive. David Ehrlich of IndieWire described it as "A.I. Artificial Intelligence meets Children of Men" and wrote that "The most fundamental reason why The Creator, for all of its shortcomings and clichés, ultimately sold me on its optimism is that it succeeds as a blueprint where it fails as a movie." David Rooney of The Hollywood Reporter was mixed, calling it a "baggy, sentimental sci-fi epic," while Peter Debruge of Variety thought that it "can hardly even keep its premise straight".

Mark Jenkins of The Washington Post wrote that the film "fails to develop the personalities and relationships that would give its central characters an affecting humanity." Jesse Hassenger of Paste wrote: "For a designated last great hope of original sci-fi, this is a surprisingly programmatic picture."

Rafael Motamayor of /Film called it "visually stunning" but "a predictable and dumbed-down story that feels like Edwards doing James Cameron's Avatar in terms of presenting bold worldbuilding and sci-fi ideas, but without the emotional resonance of that giant film. This is a very cool movie, but not necessarily a very good one." Glenn Whipp of the Los Angeles Times felt the film lacked originality, writing: "there's precious little in The Creator that feels fresh, particularly if you’ve seen one of the first two Terminator movies, watched The Last of Us or bought your kid (OK, yourself) a Baby Yoda plush toy."

Fionnuala Halligan of Screen International wrote that it "lacks the intellectual depth or ambition of the films it references - from Apocalypse Now to Blade Runner, The Terminator, Star Wars and beyond to the imagery of Kundun." Nicolas Rapold of The New York Times criticized the film's tone, and wrote: "Edwards pushes the relatable ordinariness of the androids and hybrid "simulants", but the potential menace of A.I. inescapably looms."

Richard Roeper of Chicago Sun-Times called it: "A great-looking but strange and mostly unsuccessful hybrid of futuristic sci-fi thrillers and Vietnam War films that combines elements of everything from District 9 to Blade Runner to Ex Machina to the Terminator franchise..."

=== Accolades ===
The film was shortlisted in the categories of Best Sound and Best Visual Effects at the 96th Academy Awards, ultimately being nominated in both categories, and was longlisted in the categories of Best Cinematography and Best Special Visual Effects at the 77th British Academy Film Awards, ultimately being nominated in the latter category. Special effects supervisor Neil Corbould garnered a rare trifecta of Best Visual Effects nominations in a single year, for his work on this film, Napoleon, and Mission: Impossible – Dead Reckoning Part One.

Award	Date of ceremony	Category	Nominee(s)	Result	Ref.
Hollywood Music in Media Awards	November 15, 2023	Best Original Score — Sci-Fi/Fantasy Film	Hans Zimmer	Nominated	
Las Vegas Film Critics Society	December 13, 2023	Best Horror/Sci-Fi Movie	The Creator	Nominated	
Las Vegas Film Critics Society	December 13, 2023	Best Visual Effects	The Creator	Won	
St. Louis Film Critics Association	December 17, 2023	Best Visual Effects	Jay Cooper, Ian Comley, Andrew Roberts, and Neil Corbould	Won	
Phoenix Film Critics Society	December 18, 2023	Best Visual Effects	The Creator	Won	
Florida Film Critics Circle Awards	December 21, 2023	Best Visual Effects	The Creator	Runner-up	
Nevada Film Critics Society	December 23, 2023	Best Visual Effects	The Creator	Won	
Seattle Film Critics Society	January 8, 2024	Best Cinematography	Greig Fraser and Oren Soffer	Nominated	
Seattle Film Critics Society	January 8, 2024	Best Visual Effects	Jay Cooper, Ian Comley, Andrew Roberts, and Neil Corbould	Nominated	
Denver Film Critics Society	January 12, 2024	Best Sci-Fi Horror	The Creator	Nominated	
Denver Film Critics Society	January 12, 2024	Best Visual Effects	The Creator	Won (Note: Tied with Guardians of the Galaxy Vol. 3.)	
Critics' Choice Movie Awards	January 14, 2024	Best Young Actor/Actress	Madeleine Yuna Voyles	Nominated	
Critics' Choice Movie Awards	January 14, 2024	Best Visual Effects	The Creator	Nominated	
Houston Film Critics Society	January 22, 2024	Best Visual Effects	The Creator	Nominated	
Saturn Awards	February 4, 2024	Best Science Fiction Film	The Creator	Nominated	
Saturn Awards	February 4, 2024	Best Film Special / Visual Effects	Jay Cooper, Ian Comley, Andrew Roberts, and Neil Corbould	Nominated	
ADG Excellence in Production Design Awards	February 10, 2024	Excellence in Production Design for a Fantasy Film	James Clyne	Nominated	
British Academy Film Awards	February 14, 2024	Best Special Visual Effects	Jonathan Bullock, Charmaine Chan, Ian Comley and Jay Cooper	Nominated	
Satellite Awards	February 18, 2024	Best Visual Effects	Jay Cooper, Ian Comley, Andrew Roberts, and Neil Corbould	Nominated	
Visual Effects Society Awards	February 21, 2024	Outstanding Visual Effects in a Photoreal Feature	Jay Cooper, Julian Levi, Ian Comley, Charmaine Chan, Neil Corbould	Won	
Visual Effects Society Awards	February 21, 2024	Outstanding Created Environment in a Photoreal Feature	John Seru, Guy Williams, Vincent Techer, Timothée Maron (for floating village)	Won	
Visual Effects Society Awards	February 21, 2024	Outstanding Effects Simulations in a Photoreal Feature	Ludovic Ramisandraina, Raul Essig, Mathieu Chardonnet, Lewis Taylor	Won	
Visual Effects Society Awards	February 21, 2024	Outstanding Compositing and Lighting in a Feature	Phil Prates, Min Kim, Nisarg Suthar, Toshiko Miura (for bar)	Won	
Visual Effects Society Awards	February 21, 2024	Outstanding Compositing and Lighting in a Feature	Ben O-Brien, Juan Espigares Enriquez, Wesley Roberts, Hayes Brien (for spaceships)	Nominated	
Visual Effects Society Awards	February 21, 2024	Outstanding Virtual Cinematography in a CG Project	Roel Coucke, Christopher Potter, Amanda Johnstone-Batt, Jeremy Bloch	Nominated	
Visual Effects Society Awards	February 21, 2024	Outstanding Model in a Photoreal or Animated Project	Oliver Kane, Mat Monro, Florence Green, Serban Ungureanu (for nomad)	Won	
Astra Film and Creative Arts Awards	February 26, 2024	Best Visual Effects	The Creator	Nominated	
Academy Awards	March 10, 2024	Best Sound	Ian Voigt, Erik Aadahl, Ethan Van der Ryn, Tom Ozanich and Dean A. Zupancic	Nominated	
Academy Awards	March 10, 2024	Best Visual Effects	Jay Cooper, Ian Comley, Andrew Roberts and Neil Corbould	Nominated	
Critics' Choice Super Awards	April 4, 2024	Best Science Fiction/Fantasy Movie	The Creator	Nominated	
Critics' Choice Super Awards	April 4, 2024	Best Actress in a Science Fiction/Fantasy Movie	Madeleine Yuna Voyles	Nominated	
