= No Letting Go =

No Letting Go may refer to:

- "No Letting Go" (song), 2003
- No Letting Go (film), 2016

== See also ==
- "Not Letting Go", a 2015 song by English rapper Tinie Tempah
