= 22nd Visual Effects Society Awards =

2024 visual effects awards ceremony for 2023 works

22nd Visual Effects Society Awards

February 21, 2024

Outstanding Visual Effects in a Photoreal Feature:
The Creator

Outstanding Visual Effects in a Photoreal Episode:
The Last of Us – "Infected"

The 22nd Visual Effects Society Awards is an awards ceremony presented by the Visual Effects Society to recognize the best in visual effects in film, television and other media in 2023. Nominations were announced on January 16, 2024 and the ceremony took place on February 21, 2024.

== Winners and nominees ==
Winners are listed first and in bold.

=== Honorary Awards ===
Lifetime Achievement Award:

- **Joyce Cox**

VES Award for Creative Excellence

- **William Shatner**

=== Film ===
Outstanding Visual Effects in a Photoreal Feature	Outstanding Supporting Visual Effects in a Photoreal Feature
**The Creator – Jay Cooper, Julian Levi, Ian Comley, Charmaine Chan, Neil Corbould**; Dungeons & Dragons: Honor Among Thieves – Ben Snow, Diana Giorgiutti, Khalid Almeerani, Scott Benza, Sam Conway; Guardians of the Galaxy Vol. 3 – Stephane Ceretti, Susan Pickett, Alexis Wajsbrot, Guy Williams, Dan Sudick; Indiana Jones and the Dial of Destiny – Andrew Whitehurst, Kathy Siegel, Robert Weaver, Julian Hutchens, Alistair Williams; Oppenheimer – Andrew Jackson, Mike Chambers, Giacomo Mineo, Dave Drzewiecki, Scott Fisher	**Nyad – Jake Braver, Fiona Campbell Westgate, R. Christopher White, Mohsen Mousavi**; John Wick: Chapter 4 – Janelle Croshaw Ralla, Reina Sparks, Jonathan Rothbart, Javier Roca, Gerd Nefzer; Killers of the Flower Moon – Pablo Helman, Brian Barlettani, Sam Bassett, Brandon Keys McLaughlin; Napoleon – Charley Henley, Sarah Tulloch, Luc-Ewen Martin-Fenouillet, Simone Coco, Neil Corbould; Society of the Snow – Félix Bergés, Micaela Gagliano, Laura Pedro, Ezequiel Larrú, Pau Costa
Outstanding Visual Effects in an Animated Feature	Outstanding Animated Character in a Photoreal Feature
**Spider-Man: Across the Spider-Verse – Alan Hawkins, Christian Hejnal, Michael Lasker, Matt Hausman**; Chicken Run: Dawn of the Nugget – Jon Biggins, Jim Lewis, Charles Copping, Matthew Perry; Elemental – Peter Sohn, Denise Ream, Sanjay Bakshi, Stephen Marshall; Nimona – Archie Donato, Yancy Lindquist, Theodore Ty, Anthony Kemp; Teenage Mutant Ninja Turtles: Mutant Mayhem – Matthieu Rouxel, Marie Balland, Jacques Daigle, Vincent Leroy	**Guardians of the Galaxy Vol. 3 – Rocket – Nathan McConnel, Andrea De Martis, Antony Magdalinidis, Rachel Williams**; Aquaman and the Lost Kingdom – Topo the Octopus – Thomas Ward, Andrew Butler, Felix Slinger-Thompson, Jacob Burstein; Godzilla Minus One – Godzilla – Kosuke Taguchi, Takashi Yamazaki; Wonka – Oompa Loompa – Dale Newton, Kunal Ayer, Valentina Ercolani, Gabor Foner
Outstanding Animated Character in an Animated Feature	Outstanding Created Environment in a Photoreal Feature
**Spider-Man: Across the Spider-Verse – Spot – Christopher Mangnall, Craig Feifarek, Humberto Rosa, Nideep Varghese**; Elemental – Ember – Gwendelyn Enderoglu, Jared Fong, Jonathan Hoffman, Patrick Witting; Elemental– Wade – Max Gilbert, Jacob Kuenzel, Dave Strick, Benjamin Su; Teenage Mutant Ninja Turtles: Mutant Mayhem – Superfly – Gregory Coelho, Anne-Claire Leroux, Simon Cuisinier, Olivier Pierre	**The Creator – Floating Village – John Seru, Guy Williams, Vincent Techer, Timothée Maron**; Guardians of the Galaxy Vol. 3 – Knowhere – Omar Alejandro, Lavrador Ibanez, Fabien Julvecourt, Klaudio Ladavac, Benjamin Patterson; Indiana Jones and the Dial of Destiny – Underwater Wreck Environment – Johan Gabrielsson, Adrian Tsang, Stefan Andersson, Martin Eneroth; John Wick: Chapter 4 - Place de L’Étoile – Joelle Xin Zhow, Fabrice Vienne, Vignesh Ravi, Laurent Makowski
Outstanding Created Environment in an Animated Feature	Outstanding Effects Simulations in a Photoreal Feature
**Spider-Man: Across the Spider-Verse – Mumbattan City – Taehyun Park, YJ Lee, Pepe Orozco, Kelly Han**; Chicken Run: Dawn of the Nugget – Chicken Island – Charles Copping, Matthew Perry, Jim Lewis, Jon Biggins; Elemental – Element City – Chris Bernardi, Brandon Montell, David Shavers, Ting Zhang; Teenage Mutant Ninja Turtles: Mutant Mayhem – Midtown Manhattan – Olivier Mitonneau, Eddy Frechou, Guillaume Chevet, Arnaud Philippe-Giraux	**The Creator – Ludovic Ramisandraina, Raul Essig, Mathieu Chardonnet, Lewis Taylor**; Napoleon – Koen Hofmeester, Gianmichele Mariani, Clair Bellens, Hernan Llano Duque; Nyad – Stormy Waters – Korbinian Meier, Sindy Saalfeld, David Michielsen, Andreas Vrhovsek; The Nun 2 – Laurent Creusot, Sebastien Podsiadlo, Michael Moercant, Benjamin Saurine
Outstanding Effects Simulations in an Animated Feature	Outstanding Compositing and Lighting in a Feature
**Spider-Man: Across the Spider-Verse – Pav Grochola, Filippo Maccari, Naoki Kato, Nicola Finizio**; Elemental – Kristopher Campbell, Greg Gladstone, Jon Reisch, Kylie Wijsmuller; Teenage Mutant Ninja Turtles: Mutant Mayhem – Louis Marsaud, Paul-Etienne Bourde, Serge Martin, Marine Pommereul; The Super Mario Bros. Movie – Simon Pate, Christophe Vazquez, Milo Riccarand	**The Creator – Bar – Phil Prates, Min Kim, Nisarg Suthar, Toshiko Miura**; Guardians of the Galaxy Vol. 3 – Indah Maretha, Beck Veitch, Nathan Abbot, Steve McGillen; John Wick: Chapter 4 – Apartment Massacre Videogame Style – Javier Roca, Julien Forest, Thomas Bourdis, Dominik Kirouac; Spider-Man: Across the Spider-Verse – Bret St.Clair, Kieron Cheuk-Chi, Lo Kelly, Christophers Rowan Young; The Creator – Spaceships – Ben O-Brien, Juan Espigares Enriquez, Wesley Roberts, Hayes Brien
Outstanding Virtual Cinematography in a CG Project	Outstanding Model in a Photoreal or Animated Project
**Guardians of the Galaxy Vol. 3 – Joanna Davison, Cheyana Wilkinson, Michael Cozens, Jason Desjarlais**; Migration – Guylo Homsy, Damien Bapst, Antoine Collet, David Dangin; Spider-Man: Across the Spider-Verse – Rich Turner, Randolph Lizarda, Daniela Campos Little, Thomas Campos; The Creator – Roel Coucke, Christopher Potter, Amanda Johnstone-Batt, Jeremy Bloch	**The Creator – Nomad – Oliver Kane, Mat Monro, Florence Green, Serban Ungureanu**; Guardians of the Galaxy Vol. 3 – The Arête – Kenneth Johansson, Jason Galeon, Tim Civil, Artur Vill; Peter Pan & Wendy – Jolly Roger – Patrick Comtois, Thomas Gallardo, Harrison Stark, David Thibodeau; Spider-Man: Across the Spider-Verse – Spider HQ – Dongick David Sheen, Mark JeongWoong, Lee Mikaela Bantog, René Völker
Outstanding Special (Practical) Effects in a Photoreal or Animated Project	Emerging Technology Award
**Oppenheimer – Scott Fisher, James Rollins, Mario Vanillo**; I'm a Virgo – John McLeod, Scott Kirvan, Alec Gillis, Carl Miller; Mission: Impossible – Dead Reckoning Part One – Neil Corbould, Ray Ferguson, Keith Dawson, Chris Motjuoadi; Society of the Snow – Pau Costa, Carlos Laguna, Guillermo F. Aldunate, Eloy Cervera	**The Flash – Volumetric Capture – Stephan Trojansky, Thomas Ganshorn, Oliver Pilarski, Lukas Lepicovsky**; Blue Beetle – Machine Learning Cloth –John Mark Gibbons, Allen Ruilova Momme, Carl David Minor; Elemental – Volumetric Neural Style Transfer – Vinicius C. Azevedo, Byungsoo Kim, Raphael Ortiz, Paul Kanyuk; Wish – Dynamic Screen Space Textures for Coherent Stylization – Brent Burley, Daniel Teece, Brian J. Green

=== Television ===
Outstanding Visual Effects in a Photoreal Episode	Outstanding Supporting Visual Effects in a Photoreal Episode
**The Last of Us – Season 1; "Infected" – Alex Wang, Sean Nowlan, Stephen James, Simon Jung, Joel Whist**; Ahsoka – Season 1; "Part Seven: Dreams and Madness" – Richard Bluff, Jakris Smittant, Paul Kavanagh, Enrico Damm, Scott Fisher; Loki – Season 2; "Glorious Purpose" – Christopher Townsend, Allison Paul, Matthew Twyford, Christopher Smallfield, John William, Van Der Pool; Monarch: Legacy of Monsters – Sean Konrad, Jessica Smith, Jed Glassford, Khalid Almeerani, Paul Benjamin; The Mandalorian – Season 3; "The Return" – Grady Cofer, Abbigail Keller, Victor Schutz IV, Cameron Neilson, Scott Fisher	**Winning Time: The Rise of the Lakers Dynasty – Season 2; "BEAT LA" – Raymond McIntyre Jr., Victor DiMichina, Javier Menéndez Platas, Damien Stantina**; A Murder at the End of the World – Season 1; "Crypt" – Aaron Raff, Tavis Larkham, Douglas Stichbury, Mat Ellin; Citadel – Season 1; "Secrets in Night Need Early Rains" – Wesley Froud, Scott Shapiro, Aladino Debert, Greg Teegarden; Ted Lasso – Season 3; "Mom City" – Gretchen Bangs, Bill Parker, Lenny Wilson; The Crown – Season 6; "Dis-Moi Oui" – Ben Turner, Reece Ewing, Oliver Bersey, Joe Cork
Outstanding Visual Effects in a Commercial	Outstanding Animated Character in an Episode or Real-Time Project
**Coca-Cola – Masterpiece – Ryan Knowles, Antonia Vlasto, Gregory McKneally, Dan Yargici**; Accenture – Changing Tree – Simon French, Vic Lovejoy, David Filipe, Matteo La Motta; Apple – AirPods Pro; Quiet the Noise – Iain Murray, Oscar Wendt, Dean Robinson, Sergio Morales Paz; Jean Paul Gaultier – Divine Perfume – Stéphane Pivron, Cécile Hubin, Guillaume Dadaglio, Mathias Barday; Virgin Media – Goat Glider – Ben Cronin, George Reid, Sam Driscoll, Christian Baker	**The Last of Us – "Endure and Survive"; Bloater – Gino Acevedo, Max Telfer, Dennis Yoo, Fabio Leporelli**; Diablo IV – Inarius and Lilith Cinematic; Lilith – Matt Onheiber, Jason Huang, Maia Neubig; Shadow and Bone – Season 2; "No Funerals"; Nichevo’ya the Shadow Monster – José María del Fresno, Matthieu Poirey, Carlos Puigdollers, Guillermo Ramos; The Nevers – "It's a Good Day"; Robot Dog – Christian Leitner, Bernd Nalbach, Sebastian Plank, Martin Wellstein; Virgin Media – Goat Glider, The Goat – Sam Driscoll, Kanishk Chouhan, Suvi Jokiniemi, Chloe Dawe
Outstanding Created Environment in an Episode, Commercial, Game Cinematic or Real-Time Project	Outstanding Effects Simulations in an Episode, Commercial, Game Cinematic or Real-Time Project
**The Last of Us – Post-Outbreak Boston – Melaina Mace, Adrien Lambert, Juan Carlos Barquet, Christopher Anciaume**; Loki – Season 2; "1893"; World's Fair White City – Christian Waite, Ben Aickin, Francesco Ferraresi, Pieter Warmington; Star Trek: Strange New Worlds – "The Broken Circle" – Nathaniel Larouche, Owen Deveney, Mujia Liao, Alex Morin; The Last of Us – "Look for the Light"; Salt Lake City – Pascal Raimbault, Nick Cattell, Jasper Hayward, Kristine -Joeann Jasper	**The Mandalorian – Season 3; Lake Monster Attack Water – Travis Harkleroad, Florian Wietzel, Rick Hankins, Aron Bonar**; Citadel – "Secrets in Night Need Early Rains"; Ocean Water – James Reid, Mathew Rotman, Filipp Elizarov, Nardeep Chander; Invasion – Season 2; "A Voice from the Other Side" – Zybrand Jacobs, Alex Marlow, Tim Jenkinson, Tobias Grønbeck Andersen; Loki – Season 2; Science/Fiction; Spaghettification – Rafael Camacho, Jonathan Lyddon-Towl, Julien Legay, Benedikt Roettger; Willow – "Children of the Wyrm"; Crone Duststorm and Magical Effects – Michael Cashmore, Robert Zeltsch, Jiyong Shin, Audun Ase
Outstanding Compositing and Lighting in an Episode	Outstanding Compositing and Lighting in a Commercial
**The Last of Us – "Endure and Survive"; Infected Horde Battle – Matthew Lumb, Ben Roberts, Ben Campbell, Quentin Hema**; The Last of Us – "Infected"; Boston – Casey Gorton, Francesco Dell’Anna, Vaclav Kubant, Natalia Valbuena; The Mandalorian – Season 3; "The Return" – Sam Wirch, Tory Mercer, Donny Rausch, Erich Ippen; Willow – "Children of the Wyrm" – Jeremy Sawyer, Steve Hardy, Martin Tardif, Miguel Macaya Ten	**Coca-Cola – Masterpiece – Ryan Knowles, Greg Mckneally, Taran Spear, Jordan Dunstall**; Accenture – Changing Tree – David Filipe, Matteo La Motta, Jordan Dunstall, Taran Spear; Smirnoff – Cocktail – Vittorio Barabani, Peter Hodsman, Giacomo Verri, Marc Greyvenstein; Starfield – Jimmy Bullard, Ajit Menon, Ruairi Twohig, Karim Moussa

=== Other categories ===
Outstanding Visual Effects in a Real-Time Project	Outstanding Visual Effects in a Special Venue Project
**Alan Wake 2 – Janne Pulkkinen, Johannes Richter, Daniel Kończyk, Damian Olechowski**; Cyberpunk 2077: Phantom Liberty – Jakub Knapik, Paweł Mielniczuk, Maciej Włodarkiewicz, Kacper Niepokólczycki; Immortals of Aveum – Joseph Hall, Kevin Boyle, Dave Bogan, Julia Lichtblau; Marvel's Spider-Man 2 – Jacinda Chew, Jeannette Lee, Bryanna Lindsey, Alan Weider; Mortal Kombat 1 – Christopher Chapman, Scott Quinn, James DeSousa, Jeff Palmer, Matt Gilmore	**Postcard from Earth – Aruna Inversin, Eric Wilson, Corey Turner, Bill George (TIE)**; **Rembrandt Immersive Artwork – Andrew McNamara, Sebastian Read, Andrew Kinnear, Sam Matthews (TIE)**; Hypersphere 360; SeaWorld Abu Dhabi – Daren Ulmer, Cedar Connor, Lindsey Sprague, Ryan Kravetz; The Marvels: Goose the Flerken Cat – Tim Kafka, Mari Suarez, Toya Drechsler, Sebastian Niño Florez; Zootopia: Hot Pursuit – Blaine Kennison, Jeanne Angel, Darin Hollings, Aaron Arendt
Outstanding Visual Effects in a Student Project
**Silhouette – Alexis Lafuente, Antoni Nicolaï, Chloé Stricher, Elliot Dreuille**; Au 8ème Jour – Flavie Carin, Agathe Sénéchal, Alicia Massez, Elise Debruyne; L’Animal Sauce Ail – Aurélien Duchez, Ysaline Debut, Diane Mazella, Camille Rostan; Loup y es-tu ? – Célina Lebon, Louise Laurent, Emma Fessart, Annouck François
