= Fail State =

- Directed by: Alexander Shebanow
- Written by: Alexander Shebanow; Nicholas Adams; Regina Sobel
- Produced by: Dan Rather; Adam Bolt; Tyler Comes; Terrence Crawford; Julia Glausi; Jennifer Latham; Alan Oxman; Alexander Shebanow
- Cinematography: Joel Kingsbury; Alexander J. Hufschmid; Alexander Shebanow; Oren Soffer; Michael Swaigen
- Edited by: Regina Sobel
- Music by: Jeremy Bullock; Keegan DeWitt
- Release date: October 28, 2017 (Austin Film Festival)
- Running time: 93 minutes
- Country: United States
- Language: English

Fail State is a 2017 feature-length documentary film chronicling the public policy decisions and marketing ploys that contributed to the growth of predatory for-profit colleges in the 2000s.

Executive produced by Dan Rather and directed by Alexander Shebanow, the film was broadcast on STARZ, and was screened at events across the U.S. The film marks Shebanow's directorial debut.

== Synopsis ==
The documentary examines how the changing economics of higher education contributed to mistreatment of low-income and minority students and includes interviews with experts, former college recruiters, former and current students, and former and current government officials such as F. King Alexander and Suzanne Mettler. It traces the problem back to a decision by Congress in the 1970s to switch from providing aid to colleges to instead allocating grants and loans to students to pay tuition at colleges. The move contributed to a market-based system that offered choice but also rewarded recruiting schemes targeting vulnerable populations.

Internal industry documents featured in Fail State reveal that for-profit schools specifically sought to recruit “isolated” individuals with “low self-esteem.” While the film features liberal lawmakers like Rep. Maxine Waters and Senator Tom Harkin who sought to prevent the harms, it points out that in an earlier era it was conservatives in the Reagan administration who sounded the alarm about abuses by for-profit schools.

== Production ==
Shebanow initially began filming Fail State as a documentary about student loan debt but the collapse of Corinthian Colleges shifted his focus to the way that federal aid had fueled the growth of predatory schools, while investment in public higher education declined.

== Release ==
Fail State had its world premiere at the Austin Film Festival on October 28, 2017 and was screened at several other film festivals. At one screening a veteran who had used the GI Bill to attend a for-profit school described how he was convinced to attend, earned a degree that did not pay off, and ended up with student loan debts that he had difficulty repaying.

It later aired on the STARZ network.

== Reception ==
Fail State received reviews from outlets such as the Los Angeles Times, which stated that the film offers an "easily digestible account" of an "appalling, infuriating story," Multiple outlets noted that the documentary would provoke emotions in the viewer, with The Hollywood Reporter calling it a "dispiriting look at the way young Americans have been failed not just by sham schools but by the lawmakers who help those businesses thrive". Other elements frequently praised include the documentary's pacing and balance. The Wall Street Journal noted that Fail State "is quite egalitarian in meting out blame" for the abuses, naming both Republican and Democratic lawmakers who abetted the scams by relaxing consumer protections that had been enacted in response to earlier scandals.
