= Contest (2013 film) =

- Directed by: Anthony Joseph Giunta
- Written by: Anthony Joseph Giunta
- Produced by: Steven N. Lerner
- Starring: Kenton Duty; Daniel Flaherty; Katherine McNamara; Mary Beth Peil
- Cinematography: Giacomo Belletti
- Edited by: Robert Larkin
- Music by: Robert J. Cornejo
- Production companies: Contest, LLC. Percolate Productions
- Distributed by: Arc Entertainment
- Release date: October 5, 2013 (MVFF)
- Running time: 88 minutes
- Country: United States
- Language: English

Contest is a 2013 American comedy-drama film written and directed by Anthony Joseph Giunta and starring Kenton Duty, Daniel Flaherty, Katherine McNamara, and Mary Beth Peil. The film premiered at the 2013 Mill Valley Film Festival, and aired on Cartoon Network on October 6, 2013, as part of their Stop Bullying, Speak Up promotion.

== Plot ==
A bullied teen chef wants to save his grandmother's business by entering a TV cooking contest to win the prize money, only to find his worst bully, Matt Prylek, suddenly pushing to become his new friend—and contest teammate. Meanwhile, Matt's brother Kyle wants him to do some villainous stuff.

== Cast ==
- Kenton Duty as Matt Prylek
- Daniel Flaherty as Tommy Dolen
- Katherine McNamara as Sarah O'Malley
- Mary Beth Peil as "Gran" Angela Maria Tucci
- Kyle Dean Massey as Kyle Prylek
- Alex Boniello as Joe Grasso
- Owen Teague as Bobby Butler
- Talon G. Ackerman as Will Terkin
- Chris Riggi as Ned
- Jan Uczkowski as Philip King
- Tina Benko as Rhonda
- Morgan B. Ackerman as Lada Bartosh
- Marc John Jefferies as Xav
- Robert Wuhl as Zack Conti
- Ricky Ullman as Rip
- Amar Drummond as Nerd 1

== Production ==
The film began pre-production on February 1, 2012 and ended pre-production on June 12, 2012. Production occurred in Liberty, NY and Fallsburg, NY on June 13, 2012 through July 13, 2012. Post-production concluded at the end of September 2013 shortly before the movie's October 5, 2013 debut at Mill Valley Film Festival and the premiere the following evening, October 6, 2013 on Cartoon Network.

== Reception ==
On Rotten Tomatoes the film has 2 reviews listed, both positive.

The movie won an Audience Award at Mill Valley Film Festival. It also won a Family Choice Award.

== Trivia ==
Maria Ciuffo, known as Barstool Sports' "Ria", auditioned for and was offered a role in Contest. She ended up having to turn it down so as not to miss high school exams.
