= Ian Voigt =

English sound engineer

- Occupation: Sound engineer

Ian Voigt is an English sound engineer. He was nominated for an Academy Award in the category Best Sound for the film The Creator.

== Selected filmography ==
- North Star (1996)
- Sorted (2000)
- Flyboys (2006)
- The Nativity Story (2006)
- The Boat That Rocked (2009)
- Blood Creek (2009)
- A Good Day to Die Hard (2013)
- Kick-Ass 2 (2013)
- One Chance (2013)
- The Woman in Black: Angel of Death (2014)
- The Man Who Knew Infinity (2015)
- Spectre (2015)
- King Arthur: Legend of the Sword (2017)
- On Chesil Beach (2017)
- Kingsman: The Golden Circle (2017)
- Damascus Cover (2017)
- All the Devil's Men (2018)
- The Hustle (2019)
- The Creator (2023)
