= Oren Soffer =

Israeli-American cinematographer

- אורן סופר
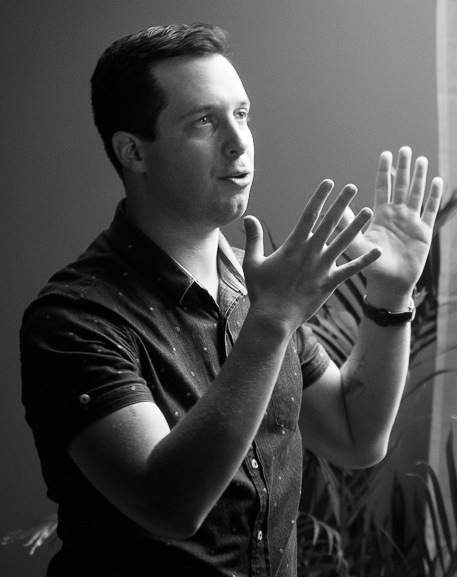
- Born: July 2, 1988 (age 38); Haifa, Israel
- Education: New York University (BFA)
- Occupation: Cinematographer
- Years active: 2011–present
- Website: http://orensoffer.com

Oren Soffer (Hebrew: אורן סופר; born July 2, 1988) is an Israeli-American cinematographer.

He is best known for his work on the science fiction film The Creator (2023), as well as Allswell in New York (2022), Fixation (2022), A Nightmare Wakes (2020), and Opera of Cruelty (2017).

In 2024, he was listed on Variety's "10 Cinematographers to Watch." In 2025, he became a member of the Academy of Motion Picture Arts and Sciences.

== Early life and education ==
Soffer was born in 1988 and studied at New York University's Tisch School of the Arts, where he earned a Bachelor of Fine Arts degree. During his studies, he was nominated for the American Society of Cinematographers Gordon Willis Student Heritage Award in 2015 and was a finalist for the ARRI Volker Bahnemann Award for Cinematography.

== Career ==
Soffer began his feature-film career with projects including No Letting Go (2015), Little Miss Perfect (2016), A Good Dream (2017), and Fail State (2017). He later served as cinematographer on Nora Unkel's A Nightmare Wakes, a psychological thriller inspired by Mary Shelley's writing of Frankenstein. The film premiered on Shudder in 2021.

In 2017, Soffer was the cinematographer of Opera of Cruelty, an experimental short film directed by Max Fedore. The film won the Alternative category at the Student Academy Awards. It also received awards at the NYU Wasserman Awards, including recognition for cinematography.

In 2022, Soffer served as cinematographer on two feature films that premiered at major film festivals. He was director of photography on Allswell in New York, directed by Ben Snyder, which premiered at the Tribeca Film Festival. He also worked on Fixation, directed by Mercedes Bryce Morgan, which premiered at the Toronto International Film Festival.

=== The Creator ===
Soffer served as one of the cinematographers on Gareth Edwards's science fiction film The Creator (2023), working alongside Greig Fraser. Fraser was involved in the film's visual development and pre-production before his work on Dune: Part Two required him to take a more remote role. Soffer subsequently worked on the principal photography of the film. The production was filmed in Thailand and other locations in 2022. Edwards praised the talent and expertise Soffer brought to the film's production, calling him a "real future rising star in the DoP world. He’s super-smart. He’s got a great eye." In a 2025 Variety article, Oren Soffer explained how the cinematography of Saving Private Ryan influenced the tank battle scene in The Creator (2023), including the use of handheld cameras, long lenses and shaky camera movements to create a sense of realism.

=== Later work ===
In 2024, Soffer was named among Variety's "10 Cinematographers to Watch." The program recognized ten cinematographers during the Newport Beach Film Festival's cinematographer celebration.

Soffer subsequently served as director of photography for Onslaught, an action horror film directed by Adam Wingard and produced for A24. The film stars Adria Arjona, Dan Stevens, Rebecca Hall, Michael Biehn, Alex Pereira, Drew Starkey, and Reginald VelJohnson. Soffer shot the film in Albuquerque, New Mexico, during its 2025 production. The film was released theatrically in 2026.

== Teaching ==
Soffer has also worked in academia as an adjunct professor at NYU's Tisch School of the Arts, where he has taught cinematography and related aspects of filmmaking.

== Awards and recognition ==
Soffer's early work received recognition during his studies at NYU. He was nominated for the American Society of Cinematographers Gordon Willis Student Heritage Award and was a finalist for the ARRI Volker Bahnemann Award for Cinematography.

His short film Opera of Cruelty won the Alternative category at the Student Academy Awards and received several NYU Wasserman Awards, including recognition for cinematography.

Soffer and Fraser were nominated for Best Cinematography at the 2023 Seattle Film Critics Society Awards and longlisted in the Best Cinematography category at the 77th British Academy Film Awards.

== Filmography ==
=== Feature film ===
Year	Title	Director	Notes
2015	No Letting Go	Jonathan D. Bucari	Also camera operator
2016	Little Miss Perfect	Marlee Roberts	Also camera operator
2017	A Good Dream	Mahum Jamal	
2017	Fail State	Alexander Shebanow	Shared credit with Joel Kingsbury, Alexander J. Hufschmid, Alexander Shebanow and Michael Swaigen
2020	A Nightmare Wakes	Nora Unkel	
2022	Allswell in New York	Ben Snyder	
2022	Fixation	Mercedes Bryce Morgan	
2023	The Creator	Gareth Edwards	Shared credit with Greig Fraser
2026	Onslaught	Adam Wingard	Cinematographer

=== Television ===
Year	Title	Notes
2016	Fallout High	TV short
2021	Action Royale	10 episodes

=== Music video ===
Title	Year	Artist(s)	Notes	Ref(s)
"Lonely Together"	2017	Avicii featuring Rita Ora		
"God Bless Our Souls"	2019	Morgan Saint		
"Pink Pony Club"	2020	Chappell Roan		
"Gone"	2020	Saygrace		

== Awards and nominations ==
Year	Award	Category	Work	Result	Ref.
2016	FilmQuest	Best Cinematography	Karkass Karts	Nominated	
2016	American Society of Cinematographers	Heritage Awards	Reservations	Nominated	
2016	Julien Dubuque International Film Festival	Excellence In Cinematography	No Letting Go	Nominated	
2017	First Run Film Festival	Craft Award - Cinematography	Opera of Cruelty	Won	
2017	Nordic International Film Festival	Best Cinematography	Far from the Tree	Nominated	
2017	IndieFEST Film Awards	Award of Excellence - Best Cinematography	Far from the Tree	Won	
2017	Reel East Texas Film Festival	Best Cinematography - Short	Far from the Tree	Nominated	
2017	Focus International Film Festival	Jury Prize - Best Cinematography in a Short Film	Far from the Tree	Nominated	
2017	Southampton International Film Festival	Best Cinematography in a Short Film	Far from the Tree	Won	
2017	Nordic International Film Festival	Best Cinematography	Far from the Tree	Nominated	
2017	Hollywood International Moving Pictures Film Festival	HIMPFF Award of Recognition - Best Cinematography	A Good Dream	Won	
2017	International Filmmaker Festival of World Cinema, Berlin	Best Cinematography in a Feature Film	A Good Dream	Won	
2017	International Independent Film Awards	Platinum Award - Best Cinematography	A Good Dream	Won	
2023	Seattle Film Critics Society	Best Cinematography (Shared with Grieg Fraser)	The Creator	Nominated	
