= Jan Uczkowski =

American actor (born 1996)

- Born: Jan Antoni Uczkowski; October 7, 1996 (age 29); Paterson, New Jersey
- Occupation: Actor
- Years active: 2003–2016

Jan Antoni Uczkowski (born October 7, 1996) is an American actor. He has an older brother, Dariusz Michal, who is also an actor.

== Filmography ==
Year	Title	Role	Notes
2003	The Hebrew Hammer	Kmart Shopper	
2004	Law & Order: Criminal Intent	Ray Garrett's Son	Episode: Semi-Detached
2006	Wander	Boy	Short
2006	Just Another Romantic Wrestling Comedy	Young John Bond	
2007	Gunmen	Young Gene	Short
2008	Moon, Stars, Earth, Horse	Jared	Short
2008	Snap-Shot	Luke	Short
2008	The Hollow Tree	Timmy	Short
2008	Luci	Ryan	Short
2008	Knife Point	Jake	Short
2008	Autopilot	Luke	Short
2008	Bohemibot	Bohemibot's son	Short
2008	Lower Providence	Terp Franklin	Short
2009–2016	The Key of Awesome	Justin Bieber / Niall Horan / Kesha Brother / Peeta Mellark / Thor	Web Series
2010	Morning Star	Ryan	
2010	You Have the Right to Remain Violent	Pothead	
2010	The Absence	Jonathan Gardner	Short
2010	Crush	Nate Young	Short
2011	Playing Doctor	Andrew	
2013	Contest	Philip King	
2016	No Letting Go	Kyle (17 yrs)	
