= Ian Comley =

British visual effects artist

- Education: Bournemouth University
- Occupation: Visual effects artist

Ian Comley is a British visual effects artist. He was nominated for an Academy Award in the category Best Visual Effects for the film The Creator. He was also nominated for a British Academy Film Award in the category Best Special Visual Effects for the same film.

== Selected filmography ==
- Nanny McPhee (2005)
- Harry Potter and the Goblet of Fire (2005)
- X-Men: The Last Stand (2006)
- Harry Potter and the Order of the Phoenix (2007)
- Underdog (2007)
- The Chronicles of Narnia: Prince Caspian (2008)
- Prince of Persia: The Sands of Time (2010)
- The Chronicles of Narnia: The Voyage of the Dawn Treader (2010)
- Gravity (2013)
- Guardians of the Galaxy (2014)
- Paddington (2014)
- Star Wars: The Force Awakens (2015)
- Life (2017)
- Star Wars: The Last Jedi (2017)
- Aladdin (2019)
- ABBA Voyage (2022)
- The Creator (2023; co-nominated with Jay Cooper, Andrew Roberts and Neil Corbould)
