= Jay Cooper =

American visual effects artist

- Occupation: Visual effects artist
- Years active: 1996–present

Jay Cooper is an American visual effects artist. He was nominated for an Academy Award in the category Best Visual Effects for the film The Creator.

== Selected filmography ==
- Space Jam (1996)
- Babe: Pig in the City (1998)
- Wild Wild West (1999)
- The Perfect Storm (2000)
- Jurassic Park III (2001)
- Star Trek (2009)
- The Creator (2023; co-nominated with Ian Comley, Andrew Roberts and Neil Corbould)
