= Sam Phan Bok =

Mekong River rock reef

Coordinates: 15°28′27.39″N 105°14′9.49″E

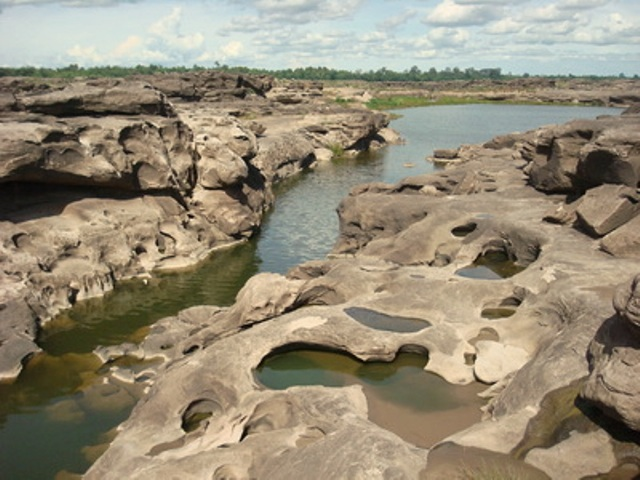
Sam Phan Bok

Sam Pan Bok (Thai: สามพันโบก) also known as the "Grand Canyon of Thailand" is a seasonal attraction and the biggest rock reef in the Mekong River. Sam Phan Bok is a group of sandstone that has been eroded by streams from the Mekong River every rainy season until this area now has more than 3,000 bok with countless basins and potholes. It is located 700 km from Bangkok. Sam Phan Bok translates as '3,000 shallow lakes'. It is in northeastern Thailand (Isan), on the bank of the Mekong. Administratively, it is in Baan Phong Pao, Lao Ngam Sub-district, Pho Sai District, Ubon Ratchathani Province. The holes in the sandstone rocks had developed over millions of years. There are different sections of Sam Phan Bok including Hat Hong, Pak Bong and Lak Sila Lek.
