= Air (soundtrack) =

2023 compilation/soundtrack album by various artists

Air (Amazon Original Motion Picture Soundtrack)

Compilation album / soundtrack album by various artists
- Released: April 5, 2023
- Genre: Classic rock
- Length: 51:17
- Label: Legacy
- Compilers: Andrea von Foerster; Ben Affleck

Air (Amazon Original Motion Picture Soundtrack) is the compilation soundtrack to the 2023 film Air directed by Ben Affleck, released digitally on April 5, 2023 by Sony Music Entertainment, the same date as its theatrical premiere. It is also scheduled for a physical release through CD, cassette and LP record during June and September 2023. The album featured collections of classic rock hits from the 1980s by several artists such as Bruce Springsteen, Dire Straits, Run-DMC, Violent Femmes, Mike and the Mechanics, The Alan Parsons Project and The Clash among various artists. It is Affleck's first film to not have a specific film score composed for the film.

Affleck curated a playlist of songs from the 1980s that had influenced him during the filming. He sent them to music supervisor Andrea von Foerster, who compiled the album along with Affleck and chose about twenty needle drops as well as limited number of score cues that were heard throughout the film. Out of a total of 17 songs featured in Air, only 13 of them made it into the compilation soundtrack.

== Background ==
External audio
- 1984 presents the collection of all songs from the 1980s that inspired Ben Affleck during the filming of Air, Spotify playlist created by Affleck

Affleck created a Spotify playlist entitled 1984 that consisted all of the 1980s music that inspired him during the filming. He sent it to the music supervisor Andrea von Foerster, who felt it as "literally her childhood" as the selection includes classic hits such as "Africa" by Toto, "Candy Girl" by New Edition and "Jump" by Van Halen, and claiming that she was not just using music to play against what was showcased on screen, but the music being used as a showcase to tell the story. Her goal was "to use music from the authentically, visually and musically where the lyrics would often match what was being seen on-screen". Since the film did not have a big budget for its music, hence she asked artists and music publishers to trust the film and its story, to compile the soundtrack.

== Curation ==
Cyndi Lauper's ballad "Time After Time" was played in the film when Sonny (Matt Damon) is waiting to learn whether Michael Jordan will sign his partnership with Nike, Inc. Even though the script had the song played, she did not have the money for using the track, which von Foerster, felt "It really was about trust and telling people this would be a great film". Furthermore, Lauper was a fan of Viola Davis, hence she agreed to use the track in the film. von Foerster originally had Don Henley's "Dirty Laundry" and "The Boys of Summer" for the main title theme, but could not get cleared in time, which resulted in the use of Dire Straits' "Money for Nothing", adding that "it plays under the logos and hits guitar when we start picture was perfect". Although the song originally released in 1985 (a year after the original time the film was set), she felt it as an "iconic song she felt it too strong to let go".

"Axel F" an instrumental piece composed by Harold Faltermeyer, used as the theme music from the film Beverly Hills Cop, was considered as a "heavy lift". As most of the film scores from the 1980s have been sold, she had to track down whom owned the cues. The film's editor William Goldenberg and the music editor Cory Milano sourced several of the score cues, which included "Axel F". von Foerster felt that the score for Beverly Hills Cop was well known and while using the theme for the short time, she felt it "excellent" and "does its job so quickly". von Foerster had licensed seven cues from the electronic music group Tangerine Dream, and also hired the former band member Paul Haslinger to compose music for few of those sequences.

Bruce Springsteen's "Born in the U.S.A." was not in the script, but was discussed in the film, hence she had to include those track along with Run-DMC's "My Adidas". Since Springsteen had sold his catalog to Sony Music two years before, von Foerster met with the executives of Sony, who saw the film and felt something to be part of the film. Hence the company had the rights of publishing the album. The Pointer Sisters' "Jump (For My Love)" was actually set to be played when Jordan visits the Nike headquarters, but instead it was changed to Dan Hartman's "I Can Dream About You" at the last minute, since the song was "a little mellow" and worked in the film. Some of the other songs that were discussed but not included, were Halen's "Jump" and John Lennon's "Nobody Told Me", due to licensing issues. In place of Halen's song, "Tempted" by Squeeze was used in the film, which Roger Friedman of Showbiz411 commented that the song would go the way of Kate Bush's "Running Up That Hill" getting discovered by the current generation after being used in the fourth season of Stranger Things.

== Reception ==
Writing for Music News & Rumors, Jake Bennett commented "The soundtrack was a blast from the past in the best way, always elevating the moment and never feeling corny." Christy Lemire of RogerEbert.com wrote "the soundtrack of ‘80s hits is such a constant it becomes distracting, from the Violent Femmes and Dire Straits to Cyndi Lauper and Chaka Khan to a truly baffling use of Night Ranger’s “Sister Christian” as Knight is simply pulling into the Nike parking lot." Matthew Monagle of The Playlist wrote "the soundtrack plays like a never-ending Spotify list of charted ’80s songs". Gary M. Kramer of Salon.com believed that the interspersions with 80s tunes throughout the film were necessary, writing that "the wall-to-wall music keeps viewers engaged because the story is more talk than action". Young Min Miller of The Eagle commented "the soundtrack for the movie is nothing short of spectacular, tastefully referencing ‘80s music and expertly highlighting the emotional moments." Mick LaSalle of San Francisco Chronicle wrote "the music is specific to the time and becomes part of the means of expressing the era". Julian Roman of MovieWeb called the soundtrack as "rocking".

== Track listing ==
Air (Original Motion Picture Soundtrack) track listing
No.	Title	Artist(s)	Length
1.	"Money for Nothing"	Dire Straits	4:08
2.	"Blister in the Sun"	Violent Femmes	2:26
3.	"Ain't Nobody"	Rufus and Chaka Khan	4:44
4.	"Sister Christian"	Night Ranger	5:03
5.	"All I Need Is a Miracle"	Mike and the Mechanics	4:12
6.	"Born in the U.S.A."	Bruce Springsteen	4:40
7.	"Sirius"	The Alan Parsons Project	1:51
8.	"Rock the Casbah (remastered)"	The Clash	3:43
9.	"My Adidas"	Run-DMC	2:49
10.	"In a Big Country"	Big Country	4:44
11.	"Tempted"	Squeeze	4:02
12.	"Time After Time"	Cyndi Lauper	4:02
13.	"Can't Fight This Feeling"	REO Speedwagon	4:53
Total length:			51:17

== Release history ==
Release dates and formats for Air (Amazon Original Motion Picture Soundtrack)
Region	Date	Format(s)	Label	Ref.
Various	April 5, 2023	Digital download; streaming	Legacy Recordings	
Various	June 2, 2023	Cassette	Legacy Recordings	
Various	June 23, 2023	CD	Legacy Recordings	
Various	September 15, 2023	Vinyl	Legacy Recordings	
