= Andrew Roberts (visual effects artist) =

English visual effects artist

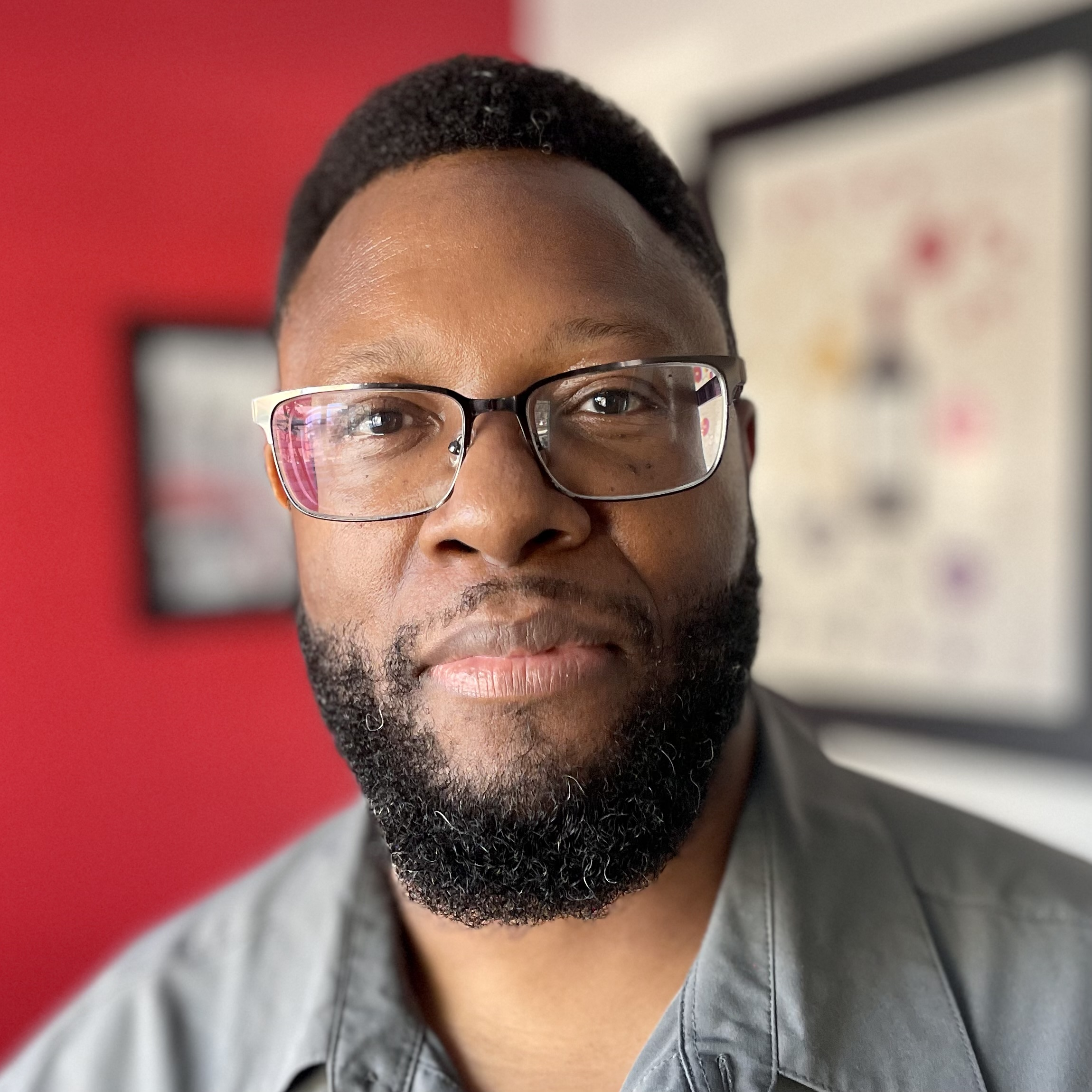
- Roberts in 2023
- Born: 17 November 1968 (age 57); London, England
- Occupation: Visual effects artist
- Years active: 1996–present

Andrew Roberts is an English visual effects artist. He was nominated for an Academy Award in the category Best Visual Effects for the film The Creator.

In 2007, he was nominated for a Primetime Emmy Award in the category Outstanding Special Visual Effects for his work on the television film Bury My Heart at Wounded Knee. In 2006, he won a Sports Emmy Award for Outstanding Graphic Design, for Super Bowl XXXIX. In 2003, he won a Sports Emmy Award for Outstanding Graphic Design, for Super Bowl XXXVI.

== Selected filmography ==
- Final Destination 2 (2003)
- Elf (2003)
- Blade: Trinity (2004)
- Zathura: A Space Adventure (2005)
- Talladega Nights: The Ballad of Ricky Bobby (2006)
- Live Free or Die Hard (2007)
- The Day the Earth Stood Still (2008)
- G.I. Joe: The Rise of Cobra (2009)
- Avatar (2009)
- Snow White & the Huntsman (2012)
- Suckerpunch (2011)
- Fast Five (2011)
- Black Panther (2018)
- Aquaman (2018)
- Godzilla vs Kong (2021)
- Obi-Wan Kenobi (2022)
- Killers of the Flower Moon (2023)
- The Creator (2023; co-nominated with Jay Cooper, Ian Comley and Neil Corbould)

== Awards ==
Year	Organisation	Work	Category/award	Co-nominees	Result	Ref.
2024	96th Academy Awards	The Creator	Visual Effects	Jay Cooper, Ian Comley and Neil Corbould	Nominated	
2024	Saturn Awards	The Creator	Saturn Award for Best Special Effects	Jay Cooper, Ian Comley and Neil Corbould	Nominated	
2015	Visual Effects Society Awards	Hubei in the Air	Outstanding Visual Effects in a Special Venue Project	Claudia Lachnitt, Yas Takata, Boris Schmidt, Sebastian Butenberg	Nominated	
2007	Primetime Emmy Award	Bury My Heart at Wounded Knee	Primetime Emmy Award for Outstanding Special Visual Effects	David Goldberg, Chris Del Conte, Joseph Bell, Justin Mitchell, Erik Bruhwiler, Tommy Tran, Benoit Girard and Tammy Sutton	Nominated	
2006	Sports Emmy Award	Super Bowl XXXIX	Outstanding Graphic Design	Jeremy Appelbaum, Marco Bacich, Jason Bognacki, Tatjana Bozinovski, John Brake, Erik Bruhwiler, Michael Caplan, Harimander Singh Khalsa, James Coulter, Jason Crosby, Chris Del Conte, Mitch Gates, Benoit Girard, Fred Haro, Martin Hilke, Robert Howell, Travis Wade Ivy, Taryn P. Kelly, Chris Liberty, Clay Lipsky, Justin Mitchell, Jerome Morin, Guillermo Pussetto, Carlos A. Pérez Agüero, Daniel Rubin, Dan Schmit, Jeff Skrimstad, Brian Smallwood, Ryan T. Smolarek, Marion Spates, Tammy Sutton, Dave Thompson, Phi Tran, Leandro Visconti, Walter Werzowa, Travis Yohnke	Won	
2003	Sports Emmy Award	Super Bowl XXXVI	Outstanding Graphic Design		Won	
