= No Letting Go (film) =

- Directed by: Jonathan D. Bucari
- Screenplay by: Jonathan D. Bucari; Randi Silverman
- Based on: Illness by Jonathan D. Bucari
- Produced by: Jonathan D. Bucari; Carina Rush; Randi Silverman
- Starring: Richard Burgi; Kathy Najimy; Alysia Reiner; Jared Gilman; Noah Fleiss
- Cinematography: Oren Soffer
- Edited by: Jonathan D. Bucari
- Music by: Alain Mayrand
- Production companies: Demian Pictures; Illness Productions
- Distributed by: Vision Films
- Release date: September 26, 2015 (NYC Mental Health Film Festiva)
- Running time: 104 minutes
- Country: United States
- Language: English

No Letting Go is a 2015 American drama film directed by Jonathan D. Bucari. It is Bucari's directorial debut and is based on his 2013 short film Illness. It is also based on the true story of the producer and co-screenwriter Randi Silverman.

== Summary ==
A young teenager (Timothy) struggles with a debilitating mental illness as his mom risks everything to save him without losing the rest of her family. Mostly, the film focuses on how the family is dealing with Tim's bipolar disorder and how it affects their lives. The story evolves around trying to stay together in difficult circumstances, with the struggles that every member of the family is experiencing. They learn through the hardship together, strengthening their family bond.

== Cast ==
- Cheryl Allison as Catherine
- Richard Burgi as Henry
- David Schallipp as Timothy (10 yrs)
- Noah Silverman as Timothy (14 yrs)
- Seamus Davey-Fitzpatrick as Kyle (14 yrs)
- Jan Uczkowski as Kyle (17 yrs)
- Julian Murdoch as Jessie (10 yrs)
- Jack McCarthy as Jessie (6 yrs)
- Lee Bryant as Emily
- Janet Hubert as Dr. Stacey Slater
- Lisa Roberts Gillan as Dr. Maynard
- Tony Gillan as Principal Collins
- Neal Huff as James
- Gabriel Rush as Frank
- Wyatt Ralff as Charlie (10 yrs)
- Charlie Kilgore as Charlie (14 yrs)
- Alysia Reiner as Lisa
- Kathy Najimy as Dr. Nancy Harris
- Noah Fleiss as Sasha
- Jared Gilman as Wes
- Jake Ryan as David
