= Neil Corbould =

British special effects supervisor

- Born: 24 December 1962 (age 63); London, United Kingdom
- Occupation: Special effects supervisor
- Years active: 1978 – present

Neil Corbould (/ˈkɔːrboʊld/; born 24 December 1962) is a British special effects supervisor best known for his work on major blockbuster films such as Gladiator, Saving Private Ryan, Rogue One: A Star Wars Story and Black Hawk Down. He is the brother of fellow special effects supervisors Chris Corbould, Paul Corbould and Ian Corbould.

== Life and career ==
Corbould was born in London. He started his career in special effects in 1978 on Superman: The Movie. This was followed by work on Saturn 3, The Elephant Man, An American Werewolf in London, Victor/Victoria, Pink Floyd – The Wall and Amadeus. In 1985, he started work on his first of three Bond films, as a technician on A View to a Kill and The Living Daylights. He was then given the opportunity of supervising the floor effects on Licence to Kill. From 1990 to 1996 he worked on many films that included Highlander II: The Quickening, City of Joy, Cliffhanger, Leon and Muppet Treasure Island.

In 1995, he started on The Fifth Element which was his first film in the role of special effects supervisor for which he received a BAFTA. He went on to supervise the science fiction thriller Event Horizon which was followed by Steven Spielberg's Saving Private Ryan, for which he received a second BAFTA. This was followed by Entrapment and the Ridley Scott epic Gladiator for which he won an Academy Award. He also received double BAFTA nominations for Gladiator and for Vertical Limit in the same year. This was followed by work on The Mummy Returns and then a second collaboration with Ridley Scott on Black Hawk Down, which was filmed in Morocco.

In 2002, he worked on Roland Emmerich's The Day After Tomorrow in Montreal, which earned him his third BAFTA. King Arthur and Kingdom of Heaven followed and, in 2005, he travelled to Australia to start work on Superman Returns. For their work on Superman Returns the Special Effects team received both Oscar and BAFTA Nominations for their work.

He also collaborated with Edward Zwick on Blood Diamond and Defiance.

In May 2007, he made his directorial debut filming the pop promo "The Price Ya Gotta Pay" for band Saints of Eden.

In 2012, Corbould supervised the special effects on Red 2, directed by Dean Parisot and starting Bruce Willis, Helen Mirren, John Malkovich, Mary-Louise Parker, Catherine Zeta-Jones and Anthony Hopkins.

Also in 2012, Corbould produced his first movie, The Coward, directed by David Roddham. Coward is a drama that takes us from the idyllic pastures of Ireland to the brutal and senseless trenches of the First World War.

In 2013, Corbould was nominated for an Academy Award for the third time for the special visual effects for Snow White and the Huntsman.

Also in 2013, Corbould supervised the special effects on Hercules: The Thracian Wars, directed by Brett Ratner followed by Exodus, which reunited him for the fourth time with director Ridley Scott.

Gravity, directed by Alfonso Cuarón was released in 2013. Corbould was part of the visual effects team that supervised the practical effects element of the movie and was instrumental in the process of getting Gravity from script to screen. He worked closely with Tim Webber, the visual effects supervisor, in creating the visual effects for the movie. Due to the success of Gravity, Corbould received his fourth BAFTA award (8th BAFTA nomination) and his second Academy Award (4th Academy Award nomination).

In 2016 he worked on Rogue One: A Star Wars Story as Head of Special Effects.

In 2023, he was honored a rare trifecta of Best Visual Effects nominations in a single year, for his work on The Creator, Napoleon and Mission: Impossible – Dead Reckoning Part One. Many speculated that the former would win in that category, but ultimately ended up losing to Godzilla Minus One.

== Selected filmography ==
=== Special effects supervisor/coordinator ===
- The Fifth Element (1997)
- Saving Private Ryan (1998)
- Gladiator (2000)
- The Mummy Returns (2001)
- Black Hawk Down (2001)
- The Four Feathers (2002)
- Beyond Borders (2003)
- Timeline (2003)
- The Day After Tomorrow (2004) (special effects director)
- King Arthur (2004)
- Kingdom of Heaven (2005)
- Superman Returns (2006)
- Blood Diamond (2006)
- Fred Claus (2007)
- National Treasure: Book of Secrets (2007)
- Defiance (2008)
- Clash of the Titans (2010)
- Pirates of the Caribbean: On Stranger Tides (2011)
- War Horse (2011)
- Wrath of the Titans (2012)
- Snow White and the Huntsman (2012)
- World War Z (2013)
- Red 2 (2013)
- Gravity (2013)
- Hercules (2014)
- Exodus: Gods and Kings (2014)
- The Martian (2015)
- Alice Through the Looking Glass (2016)
- Rogue One: A Star Wars Story (2016)
- Alien: Covenant (2017)
- Ready Player One (2018)
- Terminator: Dark Fate (2019)
- Mission: Impossible – Fallout (2018)
- Hitman's Wife's Bodyguard (2021)
- Eternals (2021)
- Mission: Impossible – Dead Reckoning Part One (2023)
- The Creator (2023)
- Napoleon (2023)
- Gladiator II (2024)

=== Special effects consultant ===
- Kingsman: The Secret Service (2014)
- Criminal (2016)
- Venom: Let There Be Carnage (2021)
- Morbius (2022)
