= List of accolades received by The Holdovers =

Accolades received by The Holdovers
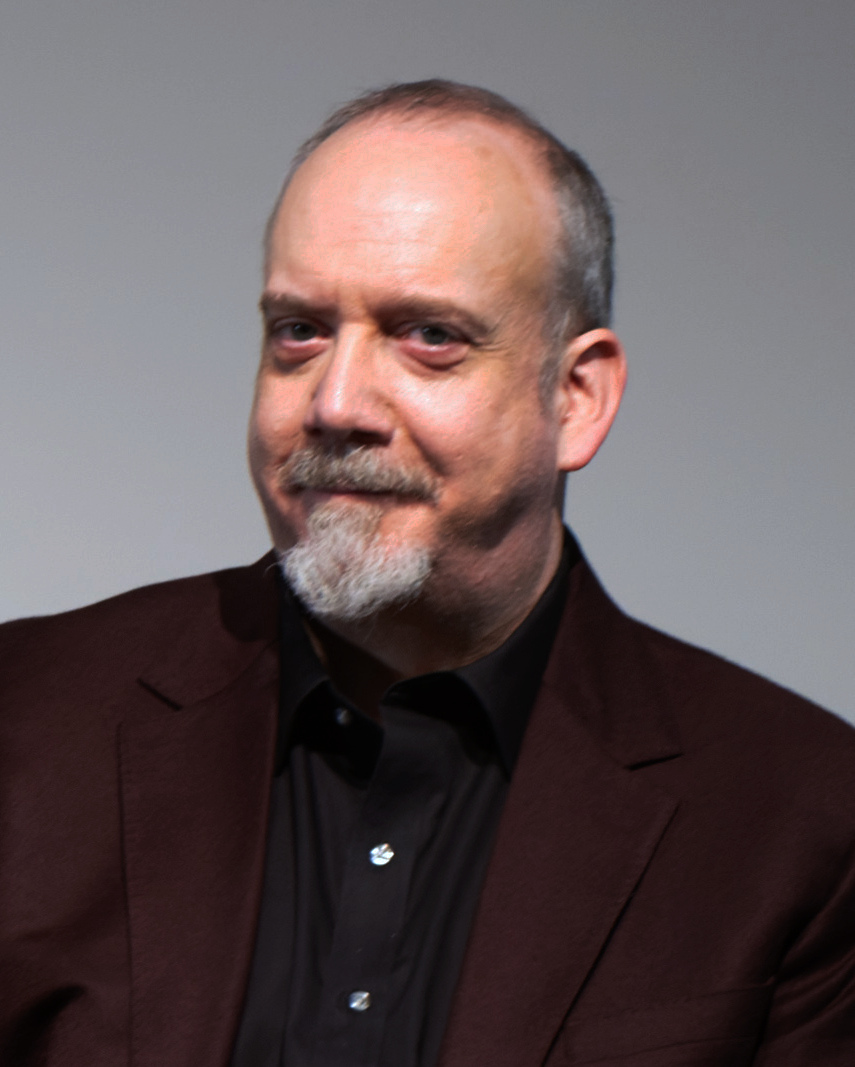
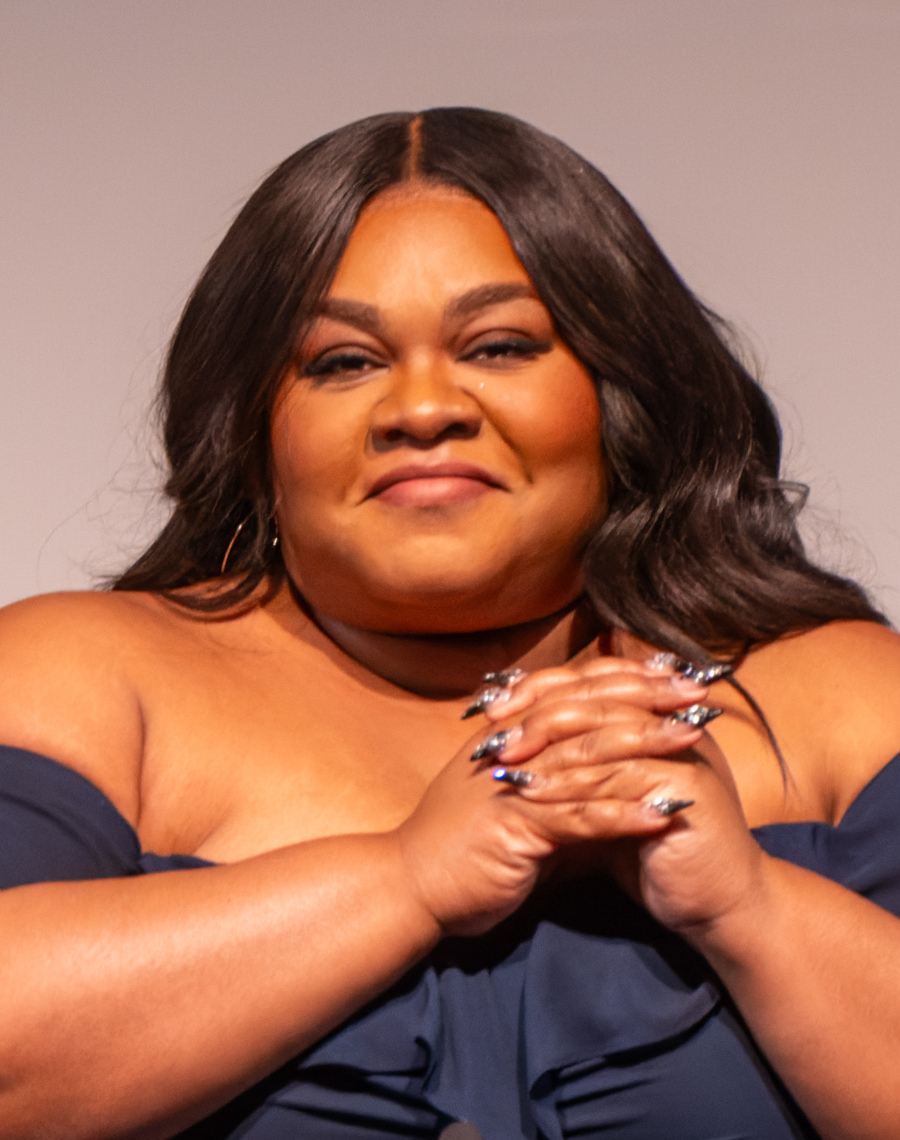
- Paul Giamatti and Da'Vine Joy Randolph received several accolades for their performances in the film.
Awards and nominations
Award	Wins	Nominations
AACTA International Awards	1	1
AARP Movies for Grownups Awards	1	4
Academy Awards	1	5
American Film Institute Awards	1	1
British Academy Film Awards	2	7
Critics' Choice Movie Awards	3	8
Directors Guild of America Awards	0	1
Film Independent Spirit Awards	0	4
Golden Globe Awards	2	3
National Board of Review	4	4
Producers Guild of America Awards	0	1
Satellite Awards	4	7
Screen Actors Guild Awards	1	2

Totals (Note: Certain award groups do not simply award one winner. They acknowledge several different recipients, have runners-up, and have third place. Since this is a specific recognition and is different from losing an award, runner-up mentions are considered wins in this award tally. For simplification and to avoid errors, each award in this list has been presumed to have had a prior nomination.)
- Wins: 120
- Nominations: 204

The Holdovers is a 2023 comedy drama film directed by Alexander Payne and written by David Hemingson. Set over the 1970 Christmas holiday at a New England boarding school, the film stars Paul Giamatti as cantankerous teacher Paul Hunham, Da'Vine Joy Randolph as Mary Lamb, the school's cook, and Dominic Sessa in his film debut as troubled student Angus Tully.

The Holdovers premiered at the Toronto International Film Festival on July 24, 2023 and opened in the United States on October 27 of that year with a wide release beginning November 10.

== Accolades ==
Accolades received by Oppenheimer (film)
Award	Date of ceremony	Category	Recipient(s)	Result	Ref.
AARP Movies for Grownups Awards	January 17, 2024	Best Actor	Paul Giamatti	Nominated	
AARP Movies for Grownups Awards	January 17, 2024	Best Director	Alexander Payne	Nominated	
AARP Movies for Grownups Awards	January 17, 2024	Best Screenwriter	David Hemingson	Nominated	
AARP Movies for Grownups Awards	January 17, 2024	Best Intergenerational Film	The Holdovers	Won	
AACTA Awards	February 10, 2024	Best Supporting Actress	Da'Vine Joy Randolph	Nominated	
Academy Awards	March 10, 2024	Best Picture	Mark Johnson	Nominated	
Academy Awards	March 10, 2024	Best Actor	Paul Giamatti	Nominated	
Academy Awards	March 10, 2024	Best Supporting Actress	Da'Vine Joy Randolph	Won	
Academy Awards	March 10, 2024	Best Original Screenplay	David Hemingson	Nominated	
Academy Awards	March 10, 2024	Best Film Editing	Kevin Tent	Nominated	
Advanced Imaging Society Lumiere Awards	February 9, 2024	Harold Lloyd Award	Alexander Payne	Won	
African American Film Critics Association	January 15, 2024	Best Supporting Actress	Da'Vine Joy Randolph	Won (Note: Tied with Danielle Brooks for The Color Purple.)	
Alliance of Women Film Journalists	January 3, 2024	Best Picture	The Holdovers	Nominated	
Alliance of Women Film Journalists	January 3, 2024	Best Original Screenplay	David Hemingson	Nominated	
Alliance of Women Film Journalists	January 3, 2024	Best Supporting Actress	Da'Vine Joy Randolph	Won	
Alliance of Women Film Journalists	January 3, 2024	Best Actor	Paul Giamatti	Nominated	
Alliance of Women Film Journalists	January 3, 2024	Best Ensemble Cast	Susan Shopmaker	Nominated	
Alliance of Women Film Journalists	January 3, 2024	Best Woman Breakthrough Performance	Da'Vine Joy Randolph	Nominated	
American Cinema Editors	February 10, 2024	Best Edited Feature Film (Comedy, Theatrical)	Kevin Tent	Won	
American Film Institute	January 12, 2024	Top 10 Films of the Year	The Holdovers	Won (Note: This award does not have a single winner, but recognizes multiple films.)	
Astra Creative Arts Awards	February 26, 2024	Best Editing	Kevin Tent	Nominated	
Astra Creative Arts Awards	February 26, 2024	Best Casting	Susan Shopmaker	Nominated	
Astra Film Awards	January 6, 2024	Best Director	Alexander Payne	Nominated	
Astra Film Awards	January 6, 2024	Best Actor	Paul Giamatti	Won	
Astra Film Awards	January 6, 2024	Best Supporting Actress	Da'Vine Joy Randolph	Won	
Astra Film Awards	January 6, 2024	Best Supporting Actor	Dominic Sessa	Nominated	
Astra Film Awards	January 6, 2024	Best Cast Ensemble	The Holdovers	Nominated	
Astra Film Awards	January 6, 2024	Best Original Screenplay	David Hemingson	Nominated	
Astra Film Awards	January 6, 2024	Best Picture	The Holdovers	Nominated	
Atlanta Film Critics Circle	December 4, 2023	Best Film	The Holdovers	Third place	
Atlanta Film Critics Circle	December 4, 2023	Best Supporting Actress	Da'Vine Joy Randolph	Won	
Austin Film Critics Association	January 10, 2023	Best Actor	Paul Giamatti	Nominated	
Austin Film Critics Association	January 10, 2023	Best Supporting Actress	Da'Vine Joy Randolph	Won	
Austin Film Critics Association	January 10, 2023	Best Original Screenplay	David Hemingson	Nominated	
Austin Film Critics Association	January 10, 2023	Best Film Editing	Kevin Tent	Nominated	
Austin Film Critics Association	January 10, 2023	Breakthrough Artist Award	Dominic Sessa	Nominated	
Austin Film Critics Association	January 10, 2023	Best Film	The Holdovers	Fifth place	
Black Reel Awards	January 16, 2024	Outstanding Supporting Performance	Da'Vine Joy Randolph	Nominated	
Boston Society of Film Critics	December 10, 2023	Best Original Screenplay	David Hemingson	Won	
Boston Society of Film Critics	December 10, 2023	Best Supporting Actress	Da'Vine Joy Randolph	Won	
Boston Society of Film Critics	December 10, 2023	Best Actor	Paul Giamatti	Won	
Boston Society of Film Critics	December 10, 2023	Best Film	The Holdovers	Won	
Boston Online Film Critics Association	December 17, 2023	Best Film	The Holdovers	Nominated	
Boston Online Film Critics Association	December 17, 2023	Best Supporting Actress	Da'Vine Joy Randolph	Won	
Boston Online Film Critics Association	December 17, 2023	Best Screenplay	David Hemingson	Won (Note: Tied with Samy Burch and Alex Mechanik for May December.)	
British Academy Film Awards	February 18, 2024	Best Film	Mark Johnson	Nominated	
British Academy Film Awards	February 18, 2024	Best Direction	Alexander Payne	Nominated	
British Academy Film Awards	February 18, 2024	Best Original Screenplay	David Hemingson	Nominated	
British Academy Film Awards	February 18, 2024	Best Leading Actor	Paul Giamatti	Nominated	
British Academy Film Awards	February 18, 2024	Best Supporting Actress	Da'Vine Joy Randolph	Won	
British Academy Film Awards	February 18, 2024	Best Supporting Actor	Dominic Sessa	Nominated	
British Academy Film Awards	February 18, 2024	Best Casting	Susan Shopmaker	Won	
Capri Hollywood International Film Festival	January 2, 2024	Best Supporting Actress	Da'Vine Joy Randolph	Won	
Chicago Film Critics Association	December 12, 2023	Best Actor	Paul Giamatti	Won	
Chicago Film Critics Association	December 12, 2023	Best Supporting Actress	Da'Vine Joy Randolph	Won	
Chicago Film Critics Association	December 12, 2023	Best Original Screenplay	David Hemingson	Nominated	
Chicago Film Critics Association	December 12, 2023	Most Promising Performer	Dominic Sessa	Nominated	
Chicago Indie Critics	January 12, 2024	Best Studio Film	Mark Johnson, David Hemingson, Bill Block	Nominated	
Chicago Indie Critics	January 12, 2024	Best Director	Alexander Payne	Nominated	
Chicago Indie Critics	January 12, 2024	Best Original Screenplay	David Hemingson	Nominated	
Chicago Indie Critics	January 12, 2024	Best Actor	Paul Giamatti	Won	
Chicago Indie Critics	January 12, 2024	Best Supporting Actor	Dominic Sessa	Nominated	
Chicago Indie Critics	January 12, 2024	Best Actress	Da'Vine Joy Randolph	Won	
Chicago Indie Critics	January 12, 2024	Best Ensemble	Susan Shopmaker	Nominated	
Chicago Indie Critics	January 12, 2024	Best Editing	Kevin Tent	Nominated	
Columbus Film Critics Association	January 4, 2024	Best Lead Performance	Paul Giamatti	Nominated	
Columbus Film Critics Association	January 4, 2024	Best Supporting Performance	Da'Vine Joy Randolph	Runner-up	
Columbus Film Critics Association	January 4, 2024	Best Supporting Performance	Dominic Sessa	Nominated	
Columbus Film Critics Association	January 4, 2024	Best Original Screenplay	David Hemingson	Won	
Columbus Film Critics Association	January 4, 2024	Frank Gabrenya Award for Best Comedy	The Holdovers	Won	
Columbus Film Critics Association	January 4, 2024	Best Film	The Holdovers	Runner-up	
Columbus Film Critics Association	January 4, 2024	Breakthrough Film Artist	Dominic Sessa	Nominated	
Critics Association of Central Florida	January 3, 2024	Best Supporting Actress	Da'Vine Joy Randolph	Won	
Critics' Choice Awards	January 14, 2024	Best Acting Ensemble	The Holdovers	Nominated	
Critics' Choice Awards	January 14, 2024	Best Picture	The Holdovers	Nominated	
Critics' Choice Awards	January 14, 2024	Best Original Screenplay	David Hemingson	Nominated	
Critics' Choice Awards	January 14, 2024	Best Director	Alexander Payne	Nominated	
Critics' Choice Awards	January 14, 2024	Best Supporting Actress	Da'Vine Joy Randolph	Won	
Critics' Choice Awards	January 14, 2024	Best Actor	Paul Giamatti	Won	
Critics' Choice Awards	January 14, 2024	Best Young Performer	Dominic Sessa	Won	
Critics' Choice Awards	January 14, 2024	Best Comedy	The Holdovers	Nominated	
Critics' Choice Awards Celebration of Cinema and Television	December 4, 2023	Best Supporting Actress	Da'Vine Joy Randolph	Won	
Dallas-Fort Worth Film Critics Association	December 18, 2023	Best Picture	The Holdovers	Won	
Dallas-Fort Worth Film Critics Association	December 18, 2023	Best Actor	Paul Giamatti	Runner-up	
Dallas-Fort Worth Film Critics Association	December 18, 2023	Best Supporting Actor	Dominic Sessa	Fifth place	
Dallas-Fort Worth Film Critics Association	December 18, 2023	Best Supporting Actress	Da'Vine Joy Randolph	Won	
Dallas-Fort Worth Film Critics Association	December 18, 2023	Best Director	Alexander Payne	Third place	
Dallas-Fort Worth Film Critics Association	December 18, 2023	Best Screenplay	David Hemingson	Won	
Denver Film Critics Society	January 12, 2024	Best Lead Performance by an Actor, Male	Paul Giamatti	Nominated	
Denver Film Critics Society	January 12, 2024	Best Supporting Performance by an Actor, Female	Da'Vine Joy Randolph	Won	
Denver Film Critics Society	January 12, 2024	Best Comedy Film	The Holdovers	Nominated	
Denver Film Critics Society	January 12, 2024	Best Original Screenplay	David Hemingson	Nominated	
Directors Guild of America	February 10, 2024	Outstanding Directing – Feature Film	Alexander Payne	Nominated	
DiscussingFilm Critic Awards	January 6, 2024	Best Comedy Film	The Holdovers	Nominated	
DiscussingFilm Critic Awards	January 6, 2024	Best Supporting Actress	Da'Vine Joy Randolph	Nominated	
DiscussingFilm Critic Awards	January 6, 2024	Best Original Screenplay	David Hemingson	Nominated	
DiscussingFilm Critic Awards	January 6, 2024	Best Breakthrough Performance	Dominic Sessa	Runner-up	
Dorian Awards	February 5, 2024	Film Performance of the Year	Paul Giamatti	Nominated	
Dorian Awards	February 5, 2024	Supporting Film Performance of the Year	Da'Vine Joy Randolph	Nominated	
Film Independent Spirit Awards	February 25, 2024	Best Breakthrough Performance	Dominic Sessa	Won	
Film Independent Spirit Awards	February 25, 2024	Best Screenplay	David Hemingson	Nominated	
Film Independent Spirit Awards	February 25, 2024	Best Cinematography	Eigil Bryld	Won	
Film Independent Spirit Awards	February 25, 2024	Best Supporting Performance	Da'Vine Joy Randolph	Won	
Florida Film Critics Circle Award	December 21, 2023	Best Actor	Paul Giamatti	Nominated	
Florida Film Critics Circle Award	December 21, 2023	Best Supporting Actor	Dominic Sessa	Nominated	
Florida Film Critics Circle Award	December 21, 2023	Best Supporting Actress	Da'Vine Joy Randolph	Runner-up	
Florida Film Critics Circle Award	December 21, 2023	Best Original Screenplay	David Hemingson	Nominated	
Florida Film Critics Circle Award	December 21, 2023	Breakout Award	Dominic Sessa	Nominated	
Georgia Film Critics Association	January 5, 2024	Best Picture	The Holdovers	Nominated	
Georgia Film Critics Association	January 5, 2024	Best Actor	Paul Giamatti	Nominated	
Georgia Film Critics Association	January 5, 2024	Best Supporting Actress	Da'Vine Joy Randolph	Won	
Georgia Film Critics Association	January 5, 2024	Best Original Screenplay	David Hemingson	Won	
Georgia Film Critics Association	January 5, 2024	Best Ensemble	The Holdovers	Runner-up	
Gold Derby	February 2024	Lead Actor	Paul Giamatti	Nominated	
Gold Derby	February 2024	Supporting Actress	Da'Vine Joy Randolph	Won	
Gold Derby	February 2024	Motion Picture	Bill Block, David Hemingson, Mark Johnson	Nominated	
Gold Derby	February 2024	Original Screenplay	David Hemingson	Nominated	
Golden Globe Awards	January 7, 2024	Best Actor - Motion Picture Musical or Comedy	Paul Giamatti	Won	
Golden Globe Awards	January 7, 2024	Best Supporting Actress – Motion Picture	Da'Vine Joy Randolph	Won	
Golden Globe Awards	January 7, 2024	Best Motion Picture – Musical or Comedy	The Holdovers	Nominated	
Gotham Awards	November 27, 2023	Outstanding Supporting Performance	Da'Vine Joy Randolph	Nominated	
Greater Western New York Film Critics Association	January 6, 2024	Best Picture	The Holdovers	Nominated	
Greater Western New York Film Critics Association	January 6, 2024	Best Actor	Paul Giamatti	Won	
Greater Western New York Film Critics Association	January 6, 2024	Best Supporting Actor	Dominic Sessa	Nominated	
Greater Western New York Film Critics Association	January 6, 2024	Best Supporting Actress	Da'Vine Joy Randolph	Won	
Greater Western New York Film Critics Association	January 6, 2024	Best Original Screenplay	David Hemingson	Nominated	
Greater Western New York Film Critics Association	January 6, 2024	Breakthrough Performance	Dominic Sessa	Nominated	
Guild of Music Supervisors Awards	March 3, 2024	Best Music Supervision for Films Budgeted Over $25 Million	Matt Aberle	Nominated	
Hawaii Film Critics Society	January 12, 2024	Best Actor	Paul Giamatti	Nominated	
Hawaii Film Critics Society	January 12, 2024	Best Supporting Actress	Da'Vine Joy Randolph	Won	
Hawaii Film Critics Society	January 12, 2024	Best Original Screenplay	David Hemingson	Nominated	
Heartland International Film Festival	October 14, 2023	Pioneering Spirit: Rising Star Award	Dominic Sessa	Won	
Houston Film Critics Society	January 22, 2024	Best Picture	The Holdovers	Nominated	
Houston Film Critics Society	January 22, 2024	Best Director	Alexander Payne	Nominated	
Houston Film Critics Society	January 22, 2024	Best Actor	Paul Giamatti	Won	
Houston Film Critics Society	January 22, 2024	Best Supporting Actor	Dominic Sessa	Nominated	
Houston Film Critics Society	January 22, 2024	Best Supporting Actress	Da'Vine Joy Randolph	Won	
Houston Film Critics Society	January 22, 2024	Best Screenplay	David Hemingson	Nominated	
Houston Film Critics Society	January 22, 2024	Best Ensemble Cast	The Holdovers	Nominated	
Indiana Film Journalists Association	December 17, 2023	Best Picture	The Holdovers	Nominated	
Indiana Film Journalists Association	December 17, 2023	Best Original Screenplay	David Hemingson	Won	
Indiana Film Journalists Association	December 17, 2023	Best Director	Alexander Payne	Nominated	
Indiana Film Journalists Association	December 17, 2023	Best Lead Performance	Paul Giamatti	Nominated	
Indiana Film Journalists Association	December 17, 2023	Best Supporting Performance	Da'Vine Joy Randolph	Nominated	
Indiana Film Journalists Association	December 17, 2023	Best Supporting Performance	Dominic Sessa	Nominated	
Indiana Film Journalists Association	December 17, 2023	Best Ensemble Acting	The Holdovers	Nominated	
Indiana Film Journalists Association	December 17, 2023	Breakout of the Year	Dominic Sessa	Nominated	
International Cinephile Society	February 11, 2024	Best Actor	Paul Giamatti	Nominated	
International Cinephile Society	February 11, 2024	Best Supporting Actress	Da'Vine Joy Randolph	Nominated	
International Cinephile Society	February 11, 2024	Breakthrough Performance	Dominic Sessa	Nominated	
International Online Cinema Awards	2024	Best Picture	Bill Block, Mark Johnson, David Hemingson	Pending	
International Online Cinema Awards	2024	Best Actor	Paul Giamatti	Pending	
International Online Cinema Awards	2024	Best Supporting Actress	Da'Vine Joy Randolph	Pending	
Iowa Film Critics Association	January 12, 2024	Best Picture	The Holdovers	Won	
Iowa Film Critics Association	January 12, 2024	Best Director	Alexander Payne	Won	
Iowa Film Critics Association	January 12, 2024	Best Actor	Paul Giamatti	Won	
Iowa Film Critics Association	January 12, 2024	Best Supporting Actress	Da'Vine Joy Randolph	Won	
Las Vegas Film Critics Society	December 13, 2023	Best Supporting Actress	Da'Vine Joy Randolph	Won	
Kansas City Film Critics Circle	January 27, 2024	Best Actor	Paul Giamatti	Won (Note: Tied with Cillian Murphy for Oppenheimer.)	
Kansas City Film Critics Circle	January 27, 2024	Best Supporting Actress	Da'Vine Joy Randolph	Won	
Latino Entertainment Journalists Association	February 13, 2024	Best Original Screenplay	David Hemingson	Nominated	
Latino Entertainment Journalists Association	February 13, 2024	Best Supporting Actress	Da'Vine Joy Randolph	Won	
Latino Entertainment Journalists Association	February 13, 2024	Best Picture	Bill Block, Mark Johnson, David Hemingson	Nominated	
London Film Critics' Circle	February 4, 2024	Film of the Year	The Holdovers	Nominated	
London Film Critics' Circle	February 4, 2024	Actor of the Year	Paul Giamatti	Nominated	
London Film Critics' Circle	February 4, 2024	Supporting Actress of the Year	Da'Vine Joy Randolph	Won	
London Film Critics' Circle	February 4, 2024	Breakthrough Performer of the Year	Dominic Sessa	Nominated	
Los Angeles Film Critics Association Awards	December 10, 2023	Best Supporting Performance	Da'Vine Joy Randolph	Won (Note: Tied with Rachel McAdams for Are You There God? It's Me, Margaret.)	
Michigan Movie Critics Guild	December 4, 2023	Best Picture	The Holdovers	Nominated	
Michigan Movie Critics Guild	December 4, 2023	Best Actor	Paul Giamatti	Won (Note: Tied with Jeffrey Wright for American Fiction.)	
Michigan Movie Critics Guild	December 4, 2023	Best Supporting Actress	Da'Vine Joy Randolph	Won	
Michigan Movie Critics Guild	December 4, 2023	Best Ensemble	The Holdovers	Nominated	
Michigan Movie Critics Guild	December 4, 2023	Best Screenplay (Adapted or Original)	David Hemingson	Nominated	
Michigan Movie Critics Guild	December 4, 2023	Breakthrough	Dominic Sessa	Nominated	
Minnesota Film Critics Alliance	February 4, 2024	Best Picture	The Holdovers	Nominated	
Minnesota Film Critics Alliance	February 4, 2024	Best Actor	Paul Giamatti	Nominated	
Minnesota Film Critics Alliance	February 4, 2024	Best Supporting Actor	Dominic Sessa	Nominated	
Minnesota Film Critics Alliance	February 4, 2024	Best Supporting Actress	Da'Vine Joy Randolph	Won	
Minnesota Film Critics Alliance	February 4, 2024	Best Screenplay	David Hemingson	Nominated	
Montclair Film Festival	October 30, 2023	Audience Award	Alexander Payne	Won	
Music City Film Critics Association	January 15, 2024	Best Film	The Holdovers	Nominated	
Music City Film Critics Association	January 15, 2024	Best Director	Alexander Payne	Nominated	
Music City Film Critics Association	January 15, 2024	Best Actor	Paul Giamatti	Won	
Music City Film Critics Association	January 15, 2024	Best Supporting Actress	Da'Vine Joy Randolph	Won	
Music City Film Critics Association	January 15, 2024	Best Young Actor	Dominic Sessa	Won	
Music City Film Critics Association	January 15, 2024	Best Acting Ensemble	The Holdovers	Nominated	
Music City Film Critics Association	January 15, 2024	Best Screenplay	David Hemingson	Won	
Music City Film Critics Association	January 15, 2024	Best Comedy Film	The Holdovers	Nominated	
NAACP Image Awards	March 16, 2024	Outstanding Supporting Actress in a Motion Picture	Da'Vine Joy Randolph	Nominated	
National Board of Review	December 6, 2023	Best Actor	Paul Giamatti	Won	
National Board of Review	December 6, 2023	Best Supporting Actress	Da'Vine Joy Randolph	Won	
National Board of Review	December 6, 2023	Best Original Screenplay	David Hemingson	Won	
National Board of Review	December 6, 2023	Top Ten Films	The Holdovers	Won	
National Society of Film Critics	January 6, 2024	Best Supporting Actress	Da'Vine Joy Randolph	Won	
National Society of Film Critics	January 6, 2024	Best Screenplay	David Hemingson	Third place	
New Mexico Film Critics	January 5, 2024	Best Supporting Actress	Da'Vine Joy Randolph	Won	
New York Film Critics Circle	November 30, 2023	Best Supporting Actress	Da'Vine Joy Randolph	Won	
New York Film Critics Online	December 15, 2023	Best Supporting Actress	Da'Vine Joy Randolph	Won	
New York Film Critics Online	December 15, 2023	Top Films of the Year	The Holdovers	Won	
North Carolina Film Critics Association	January 3, 2024	Best Narrative Film	The Holdovers	Nominated	
North Carolina Film Critics Association	January 3, 2024	Best Actor	Paul Giamatti	Nominated	
North Carolina Film Critics Association	January 3, 2024	Best Supporting Actress	Da'Vine Joy Randolph	Won	
North Carolina Film Critics Association	January 3, 2024	Best Acting Ensemble	The Holdovers	Nominated	
North Carolina Film Critics Association	January 3, 2024	Best Original Screenplay	David Hemingson	Nominated	
North Carolina Film Critics Association	January 3, 2024	Best Breakthrough Performance	Dominic Sessa	Won	
North Dakota Film Society	January 15, 2024	Best Director	Alexander Payne	Nominated	
North Dakota Film Society	January 15, 2024	Best Actor	Paul Giamatti	Nominated	
North Dakota Film Society	January 15, 2024	Best Supporting Actress	Da'Vine Joy Randolph	Won	
North Dakota Film Society	January 15, 2024	Best Screenplay	David Hemingson	Won	
North Texas Film Critics Association	December 18, 2023	Best Picture	The Holdovers	Nominated	
North Texas Film Critics Association	December 18, 2023	Best Actor	Paul Giamatti	Won	
North Texas Film Critics Association	December 18, 2023	Best Supporting Actor	Dominic Sessa	Nominated	
North Texas Film Critics Association	December 18, 2023	Best Supporting Actress	Da'Vine Joy Randolph	Won	
North Texas Film Critics Association	December 18, 2023	Best Director	Alexander Payne	Nominated	
North Texas Film Critics Association	December 18, 2023	Best Newcomer	Dominic Sessa	Won	
North Texas Film Critics Association	December 18, 2023	Best Screenplay	David Hemingson	Won	
North Texas Film Critics Association	December 18, 2023	Gary Murray Award (Best Ensemble)	The Holdovers	Nominated	
Oklahoma Film Critics Circle	January 3, 2024	Best Film	The Holdovers	Runner-up	
Oklahoma Film Critics Circle	January 3, 2024	Best Actor	Paul Giamatti	Won	
Oklahoma Film Critics Circle	January 3, 2024	Best Supporting Actress	Da'Vine Joy Randolph	Won	
Oklahoma Film Critics Circle	January 3, 2024	Best Original Screenplay	David Hemingson	Won	
Online Association of Female Film Critics	December 21, 2023	Best Male Lead	Paul Giamatti	Won	
Online Association of Female Film Critics	December 21, 2023	Best Supporting Female	Da'Vine Joy Randolph	Won	
Online Association of Female Film Critics	December 21, 2023	Best Acting Ensemble	The Holdovers	Runner-up	
Online Association of Female Film Critics	December 21, 2023	Best Original Screenplay	David Hemingson	Nominated	
Online Association of Female Film Critics	December 21, 2023	Best Editing	Kevin Tent	Nominated	
Online Association of Female Film Critics	December 21, 2023	Breakthrough Performance	Dominic Sessa	Won (Note: Tied with Charles Melton for May December)	
Online Film & Television Association	March 3, 2024	Best Picture	The Holdovers	Runner-up	
Online Film & Television Association	March 3, 2024	Best Actor	Paul Giamatti	Won	
Online Film & Television Association	March 3, 2024	Best Supporting Actress	Da'Vine Joy Randolph	Won	
Online Film & Television Association	March 3, 2024	Best Breakthrough Performance: Male	Dominic Sessa	Won	
Online Film & Television Association	March 3, 2024	Best Ensemble	The Holdovers	Nominated	
Online Film & Television Association	March 3, 2024	Best Feature Debut	David Hemingson	Runner-up	
Online Film & Television Association	March 3, 2024	Best Original Screenplay	David Hemingson	Won	
Online Film & Television Association	March 3, 2024	Best Casting	Susan Shopmaker	Nominated	
Online Film & Television Association	March 3, 2024	Best Movie Trailer	Trailer #1	Nominated	
Palm Springs International Film Festival	January 4, 2024	Breakthrough Performance Award	Da'Vine Joy Randolph	Won	
Philadelphia Film Critics Circle	December 13, 2023	Best Supporting Actress	Da'Vine Joy Randolph	Won	
Phoenix Film Critics Society	December 18, 2023	Top Ten Films	The Holdovers	Won	
Phoenix Film Critics Society	December 18, 2023	Best Actress in a Supporting Role	Da'Vine Joy Randolph	Won	
Phoenix Film Critics Society	December 18, 2023	Best Original Screenplay	David Hemingson	Won	
Portland Critics Association	January 15, 2024	Best Actor in a Leading Role	Paul Giamatti	Nominated	
Portland Critics Association	January 15, 2024	Best Actress in a Supporting Role	Da'Vine Joy Randolph	Runner-up	
Portland Critics Association	January 15, 2024	Best Comedy Feature	The Holdovers	Nominated	
Portland Critics Association	January 15, 2024	Best Screenplay	David Hemingson	Nominated	
Producers Guild of America Awards	February 25, 2024	Outstanding Producer of Theatrical Motion Pictures	The Holdovers	Nominated	
San Diego Film Critics Society	December 19, 2023	Best Picture	The Holdovers	Nominated	
San Diego Film Critics Society	December 19, 2023	Best Actor	Paul Giamatti	Runner-up	
San Diego Film Critics Society	December 19, 2023	Best Supporting Actress	Da'Vine Joy Randolph	Runner-up	
San Diego Film Critics Society	December 19, 2023	Best Original Screenplay	David Hemingson	Runner-up	
San Diego Film Critics Society	December 19, 2023	Best Use of Music	The Holdovers	Nominated	
San Diego Film Critics Society	December 19, 2023	Best Ensemble	The Holdovers	Won	
San Francisco Bay Area Film Critics Circle	January 9, 2024	Best Original Screenplay	David Hemingson	Nominated	
San Francisco Bay Area Film Critics Circle	January 9, 2024	Best Actor	Paul Giamatti	Nominated	
San Francisco Bay Area Film Critics Circle	January 9, 2024	Best Supporting Actress	Da'Vine Joy Randolph	Won	
Santa Barbara International Film Festival	February 10, 2024	Virtuoso Award	Da'Vine Joy Randolph	Won (Note: Recognized alongside Danielle Brooks, Colman Domingo, America Ferrera, Lily Gladstone, Greta Lee, Charles Melton, and Andrew Scott.)	
Satellite Awards	March 3, 2024	Best Actor - Motion Picture Musical or Comedy	Paul Giamatti	Won	
Satellite Awards	March 3, 2024	Best Supporting Actress – Motion Picture	Da'Vine Joy Randolph	Won	
Satellite Awards	March 3, 2024	Best Supporting Actor – Motion Picture	Dominic Sessa	Nominated	
Satellite Awards	March 3, 2024	Best Motion Picture – Comedy or Musical	The Holdovers	Won	
Satellite Awards	March 3, 2024	Best Director	Alexander Payne	Nominated	
Satellite Awards	March 3, 2024	Best Original Screenplay	David Hemingson	Nominated	
Satellite Awards	March 3, 2024	Best Editing	Kevin Tent	Won	
Screen Actors Guild Awards	February 24, 2024	Outstanding Performance by a Male Actor in a Leading Role	Paul Giamatti	Nominated	
Screen Actors Guild Awards	February 24, 2024	Outstanding Performance by a Female Actor in a Supporting Role	Da'Vine Joy Randolph	Won	
Seattle Film Critics Society	January 8, 2024	Best Picture	The Holdovers	Nominated	
Seattle Film Critics Society	January 8, 2024	Best Actor	Paul Giamatti	Nominated	
Seattle Film Critics Society	January 8, 2024	Best Supporting Actress	Da'Vine Joy Randolph	Won	
Seattle Film Critics Society	January 8, 2024	Best Ensemble Cast	Susan Shopmaker	Won	
Seattle Film Critics Society	January 8, 2024	Best Screenplay	David Hemingson	Won	
Southeastern Film Critics Association	December 18, 2023	Best Picture	The Holdovers	Third place	
Southeastern Film Critics Association	December 18, 2023	Best Supporting Actress	Da'Vine Joy Randolph	Won	
Southeastern Film Critics Association	December 18, 2023	Best Original Screenplay	David Hemingson	Won	
St. Louis Film Critics Association	December 17, 2023	Best Film	The Holdovers	Nominated	
St. Louis Film Critics Association	December 17, 2023	Best Actor	Paul Giamatti	Runner-up	
St. Louis Film Critics Association	December 17, 2023	Best Supporting Actor	Dominic Sessa	Nominated	
St. Louis Film Critics Association	December 17, 2023	Best Supporting Actress	Da'Vine Joy Randolph	Won	
St. Louis Film Critics Association	December 17, 2023	Best Ensemble	The Holdovers	Won	
St. Louis Film Critics Association	December 17, 2023	Best Original Screenplay	David Hemingson	Runner-up	
St. Louis Film Critics Association	December 17, 2023	Best Editing	Kevin Tent	Nominated	
St. Louis Film Critics Association	December 17, 2023	Best Soundtrack	The Holdovers	Nominated	
St. Louis Film Critics Association	December 17, 2023	Best Comedy Film	The Holdovers	Won	
Toronto Film Critics Association	December 17, 2023	Outstanding Lead Performance	Paul Giamatti	Nominated	
Toronto Film Critics Association	December 17, 2023	Outstanding Supporting Performance	Da'Vine Joy Randolph	Won (Note: Tied with Ryan Gosling for Barbie.)	
Toronto Film Critics Association	December 17, 2023	Outstanding Breakthrough Performance	Dominic Sessa	Nominated	
Toronto International Film Festival	September 17, 2023	People's Choice Award	Alexander Payne	Runner-up	
UK Film Critics Association	December 17, 2023	Actor of the Year	Paul Giamatti	Nominated	
UK Film Critics Association	December 17, 2023	Supporting Actress of the Year	Da'Vine Joy Randolph	Nominated	
Utah Film Critics Association	January 6, 2024	Best Picture	The Holdovers	Nominated	
Utah Film Critics Association	January 6, 2024	Best Lead Performance, Male	Paul Giamatti	Nominated	
Utah Film Critics Association	January 6, 2024	Best Supporting Performance, Male	Dominic Sessa	Won	
Utah Film Critics Association	January 6, 2024	Best Supporting Performance, Female	Da'Vine Joy Randolph	Won	
Utah Film Critics Association	January 6, 2024	Best Ensemble Cast	The Holdovers	Runner-up	
Utah Film Critics Association	January 6, 2024	Best Original Screenplay	David Hemingson	Nominated	
Utah Film Critics Association	January 6, 2024	Best Film Editing	Kevin Tent	Runner-up (Note: Tied with Jennifer Lame for Oppenheimer.)	
Utah Film Critics Association	January 6, 2024	Best Overall Performance	Da'Vine Joy Randolph	Runner-up	
Vancouver Film Critics Circle	February 12, 2024	Best Actor	Paul Giamatti	Won	
Vancouver Film Critics Circle	February 12, 2024	Best Supporting Actress	Da'Vine Joy Randolph	Won	
Washington D.C. Area Film Critics Association	December 10, 2023	Best Film	The Holdovers	Nominated	
Washington D.C. Area Film Critics Association	December 10, 2023	Best Actor	Paul Giamatti	Nominated	
Washington D.C. Area Film Critics Association	December 10, 2023	Best Supporting Actor	Dominic Sessa	Nominated	
Washington D.C. Area Film Critics Association	December 10, 2023	Best Supporting Actress	Da'Vine Joy Randolph	Won	
Washington D.C. Area Film Critics Association	December 10, 2023	Best Original Screenplay	David Hemingson	Nominated	
Washington D.C. Area Film Critics Association	December 10, 2023	Best Youth Performance	Dominic Sessa	Won	
Washington D.C. Area Film Critics Association	December 10, 2023	Best Ensemble	The Holdovers	Nominated	
Women Film Critics Circle	December 18, 2023	Best Supporting Actress	Da'Vine Joy Randolph	Won	
Writers Guild of America Awards	April 14, 2024	Best Original Screenplay	David Hemingson	Won	
