= Boston Society of Film Critics Awards 2023 =

Annual US film awards ceremony

44th BSFC Awards

December 10, 2023

Best Film:
The Holdovers

The 44th Boston Society of Film Critics Awards, honoring the best in filmmaking in 2023, were given on December 10, 2023.

== Winners ==
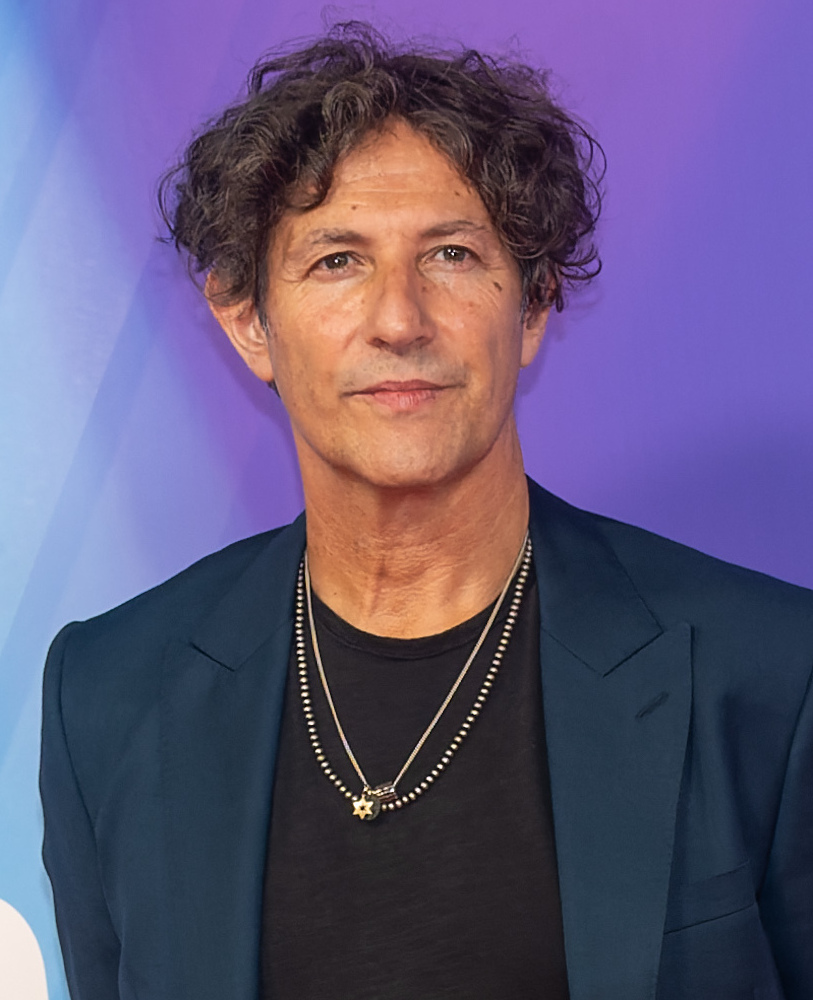
Jonathan Glazer, Best Director and Best Adapted Screenplay winner

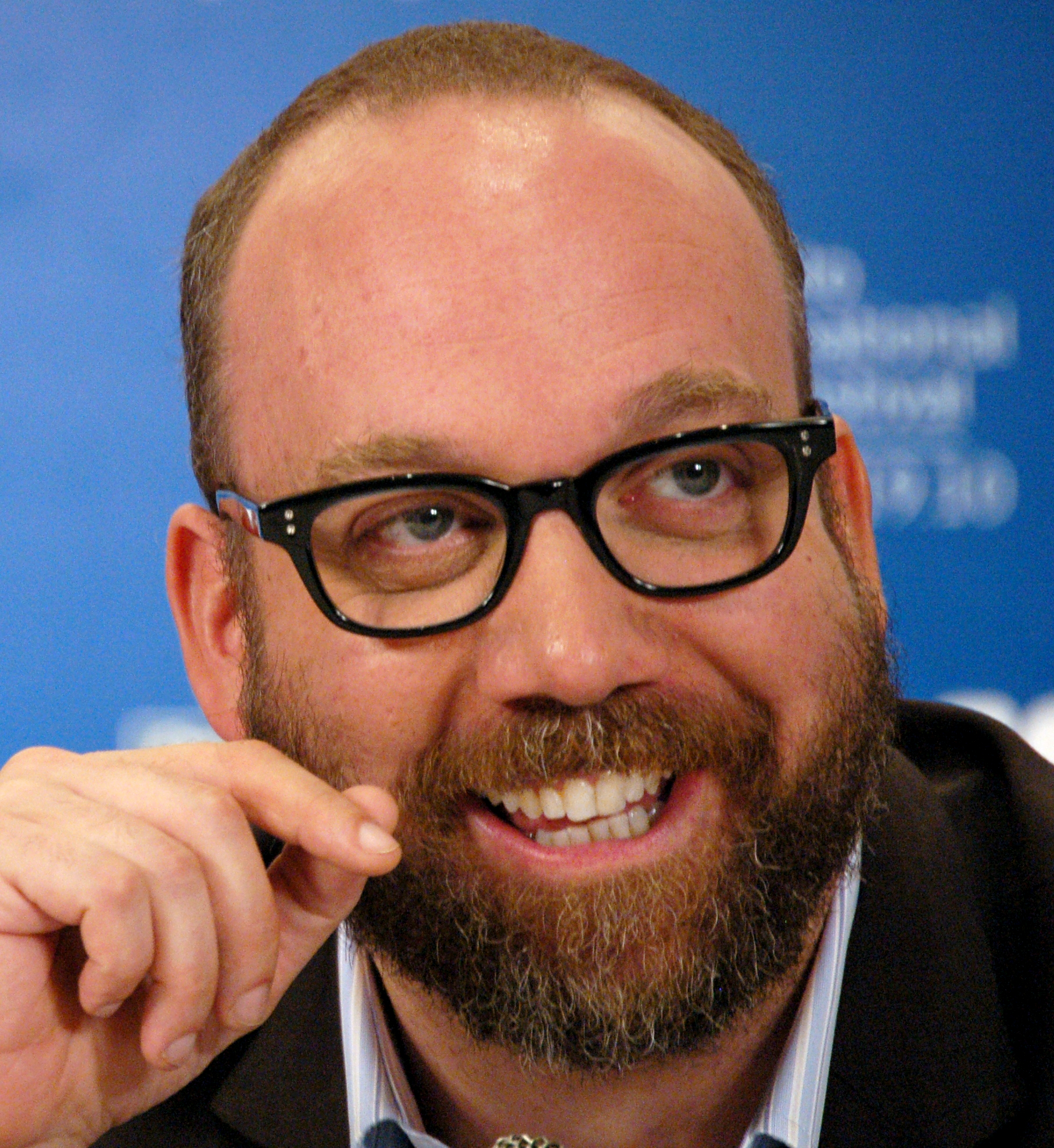
Paul Giamatti, Best Actor winner

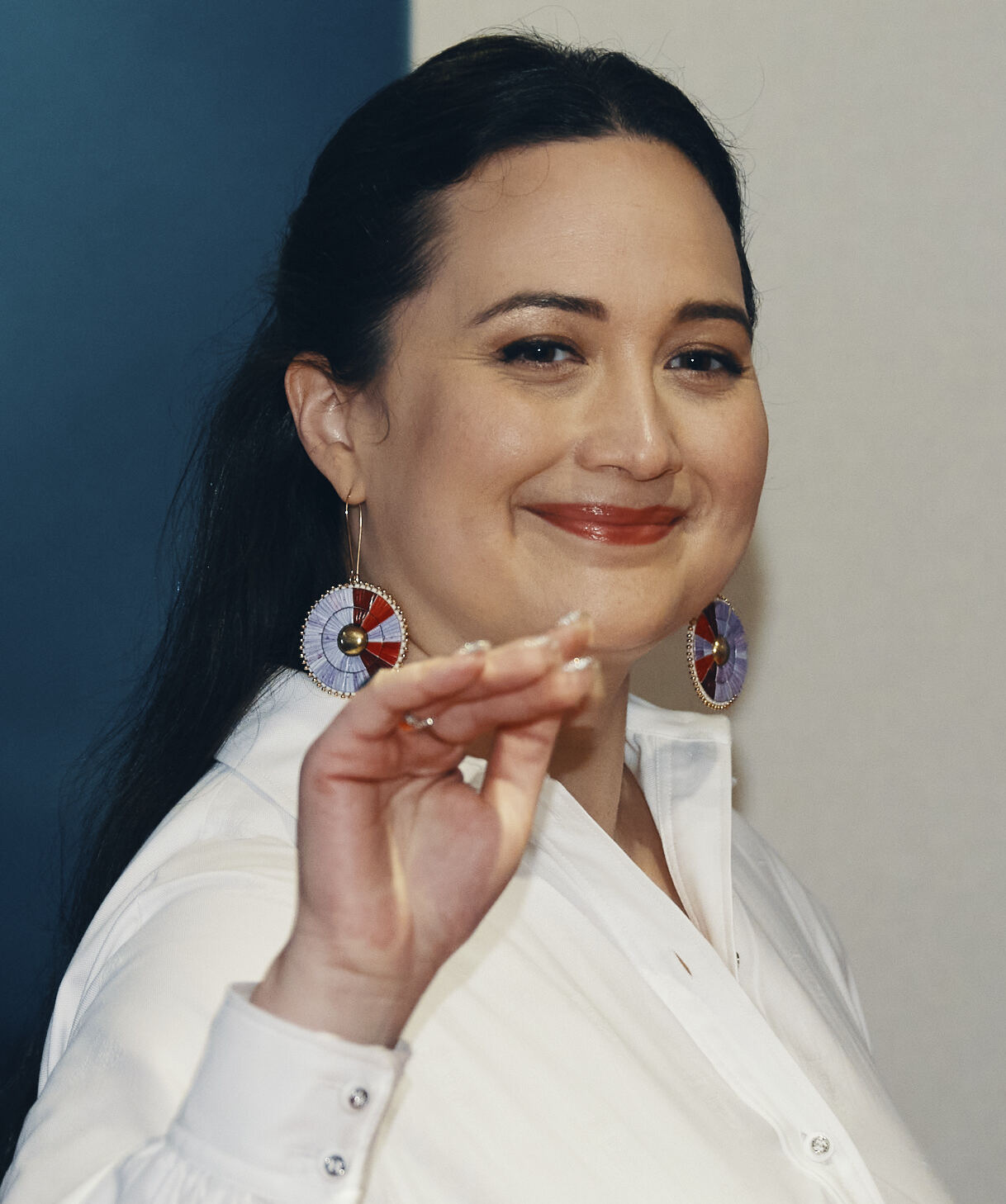
Lily Gladstone, Best Actress winner

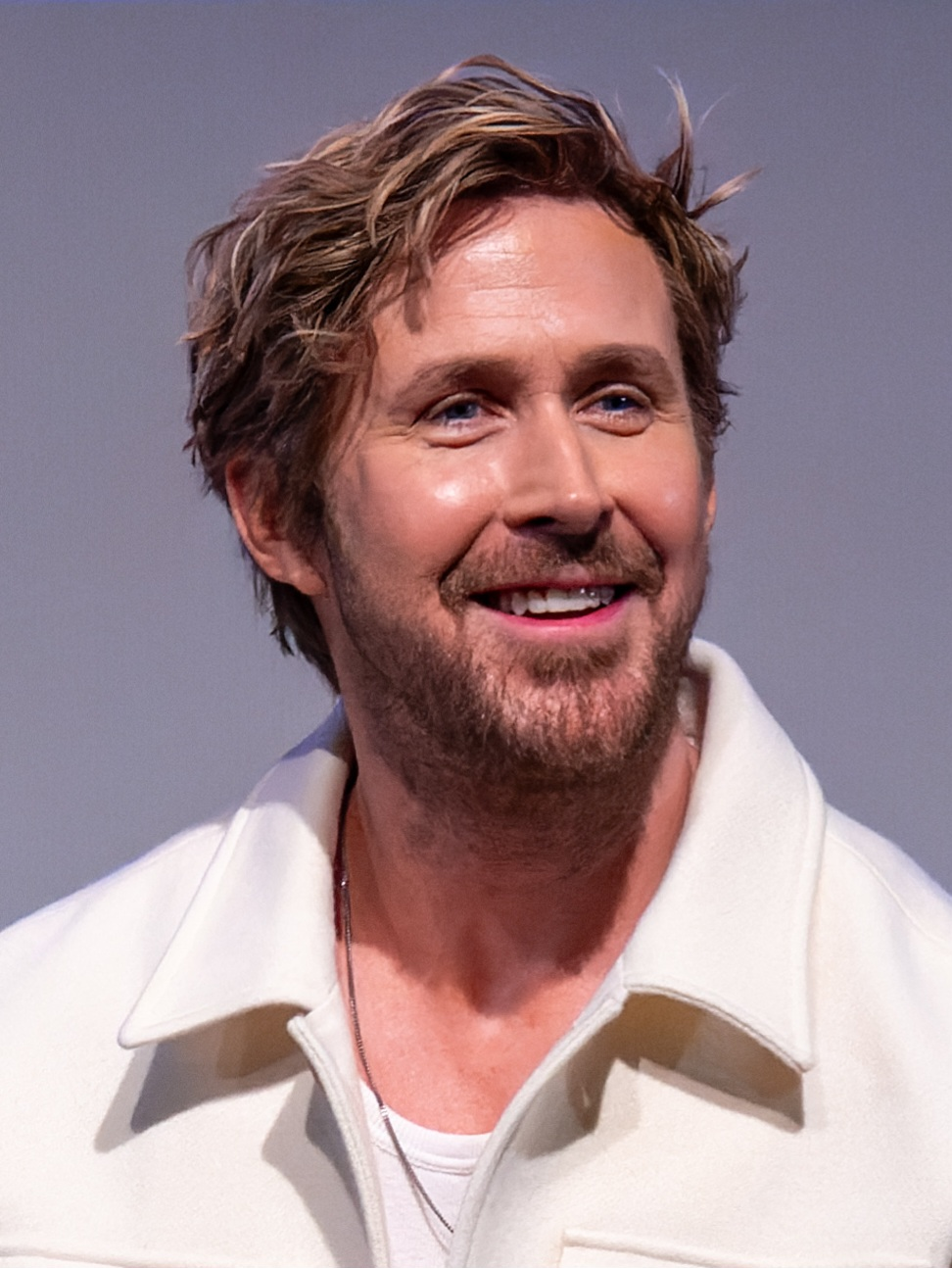
Ryan Gosling, Best Supporting Actor winner

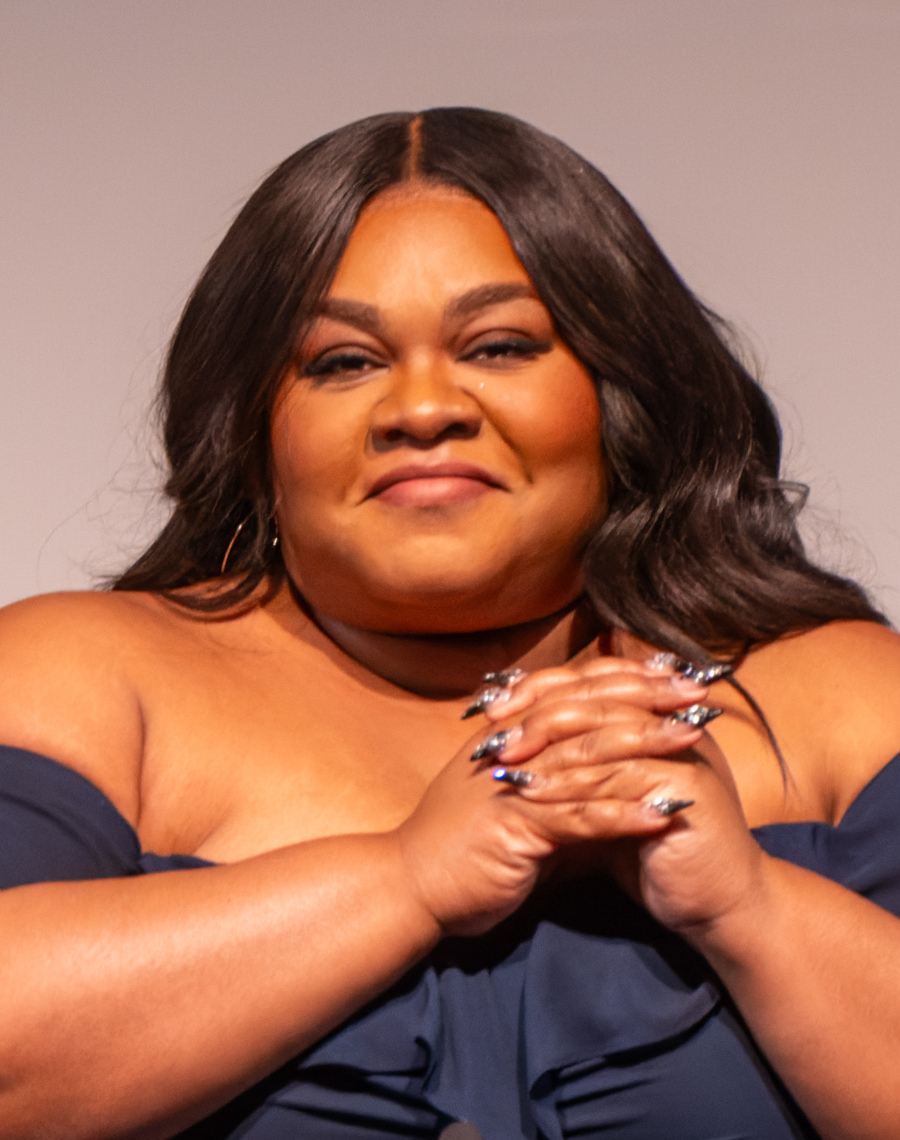
Da'Vine Joy Randolph, Best Supporting Actress winner

- Best Picture:
  - The Holdovers
    - Runners-up: The Zone of Interest / May December
- Best Director:
  - Jonathan Glazer – The Zone of Interest
    - Runners-up: Christopher Nolan – Oppenheimer / Todd Haynes – May December
- Best Actor:
  - Paul Giamatti – The Holdovers
    - Runners-up: Cillian Murphy – Oppenheimer / Koji Yakusho – Perfect Days
- Best Actress:
  - Lily Gladstone – Killers of the Flower Moon
    - Runners-up: Emma Stone – Poor Things / Sandra Hüller – Anatomy of a Fall / Natalie Portman – May December
- Best Supporting Actor:
  - Ryan Gosling – Barbie
    - Runners-up: Charles Melton – May December / Mark Ruffalo – Poor Things / Robert Downey Jr. – Oppenheimer
- Best Supporting Actress:
  - Da'Vine Joy Randolph – The Holdovers
    - Runners-up: None
- Best Original Screenplay:
  - David Hemingson – The Holdovers
    - Runners-up: Samy Burch – May December / Nicole Holofcener – You Hurt My Feelings
- Best Adapted Screenplay:
  - Jonathan Glazer – The Zone of Interest
    - Runners-up: Kelly Fremon Craig – Are You There God? It's Me, Margaret. / Eric Roth and Martin Scorsese – Killers of the Flower Moon
- Best Animated Film:
  - The Boy and the Heron
    - Runners-up: Teenage Mutant Ninja Turtles: Mutant Mayhem / Spider-Man: Across the Spider-Verse / Robot Dreams / The Peasants
- Best Documentary:
  - Geographies of Solitude
    - Runners-up: None
- Best Non-English Language Film:
  - The Zone of Interest
    - Runners-up: None
- Best Cinematography:
  - Jonathan Ricquebourg – The Taste of Things
    - Runners-up: Robbie Ryan – Poor Things / Robert Yeoman – Asteroid City
- Best Film Editing:
  - Thelma Schoonmaker – Killers of the Flower Moon
    - Runners-up: None
- Best Original Score:
  - Robbie Robertson – Killers of the Flower Moon
    - Runners-up: Mica Levi – The Zone of Interest
- Best New Filmmaker:
  - Celine Song – Past Lives
    - Runners-up: Cord Jefferson – American Fiction / A. V. Rockwell – A Thousand and One
- Best Ensemble Cast:
  - Oppenheimer
    - Runners-up: Asteroid City / The Iron Claw / Killers of the Flower Moon
