= 2023 New York Film Critics Circle Awards =

89th New York Film Critics Circle Awards

89th NYFCC Awards
- Date: November 30, 2023

Highlights
- Best Picture: Killers of the Flower Moon

The 89th New York Film Critics Circle Awards, honoring the best in film for 2023, were announced on November 30, 2023.

The annual gala awards dinner took place at Tao Downtown in New York on January 3, 2024.

== Winners ==
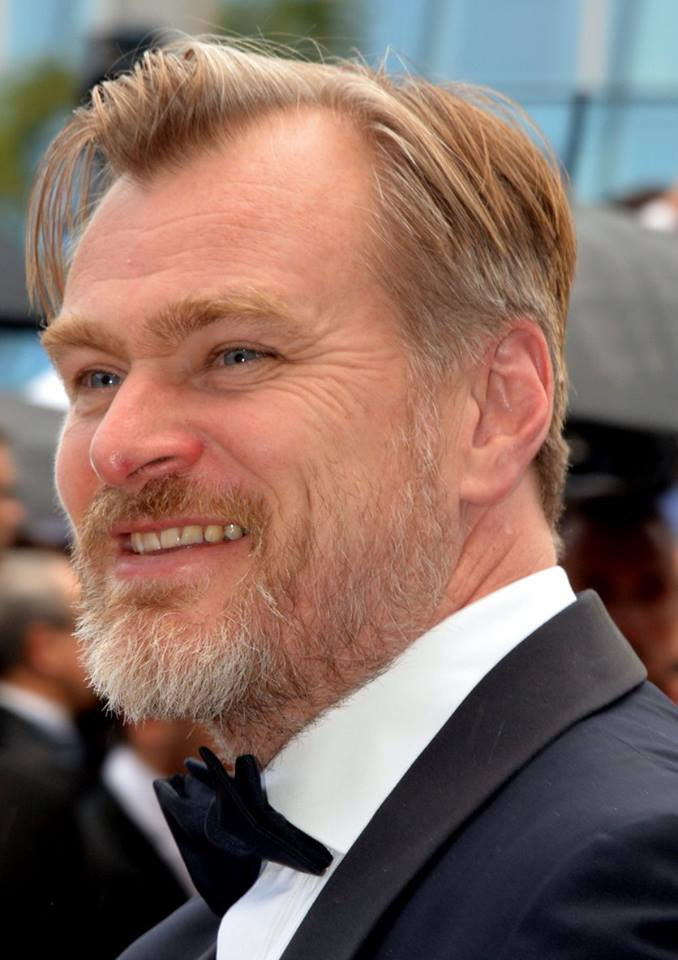
Christopher Nolan, Best Director winner

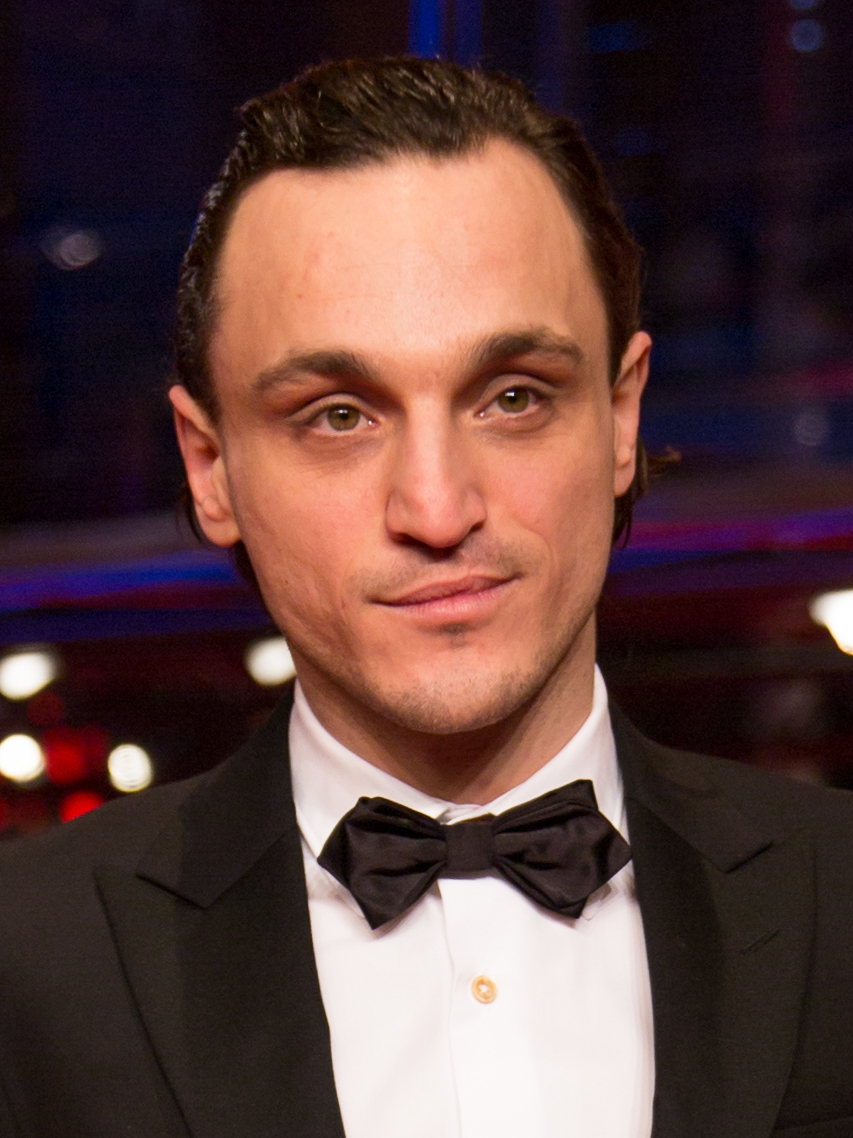
Franz Rogowski, Best Actor winner

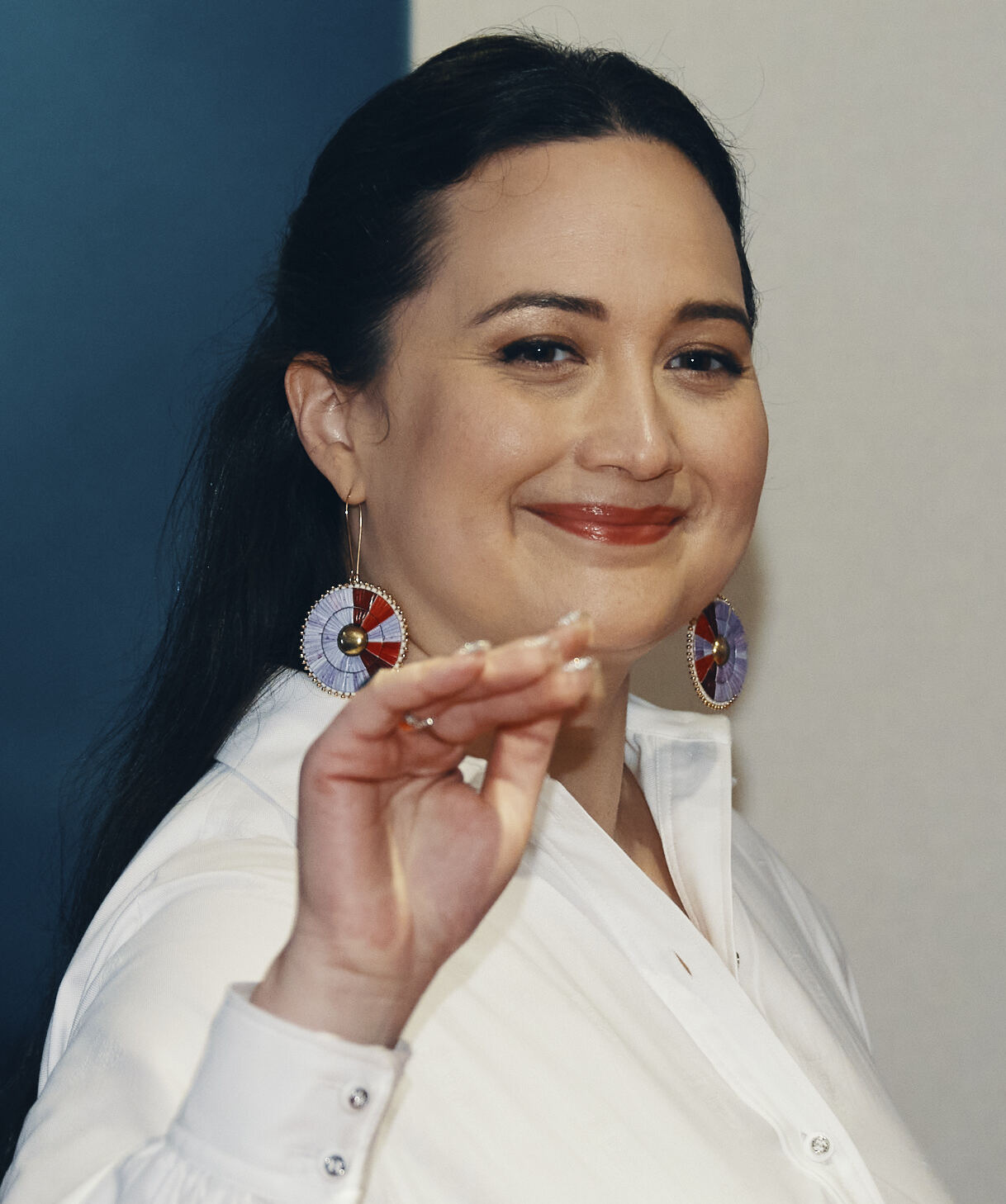
Lily Gladstone, Best Actress winner

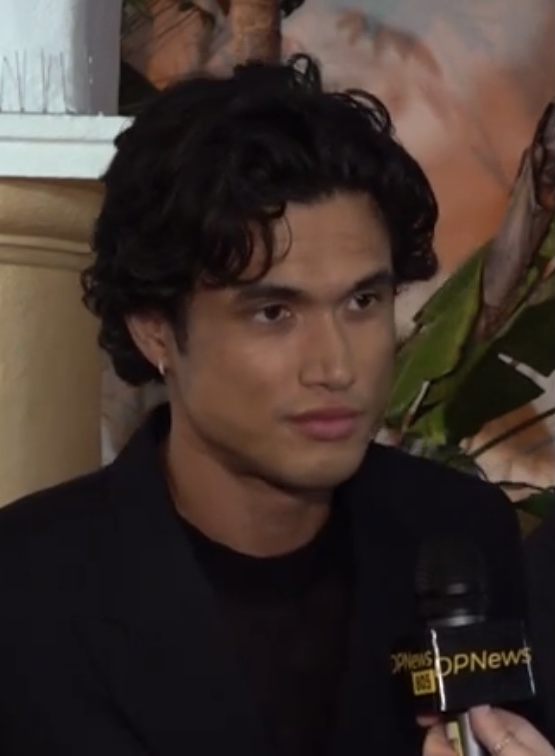
Charles Melton, Best Supporting Actor winner

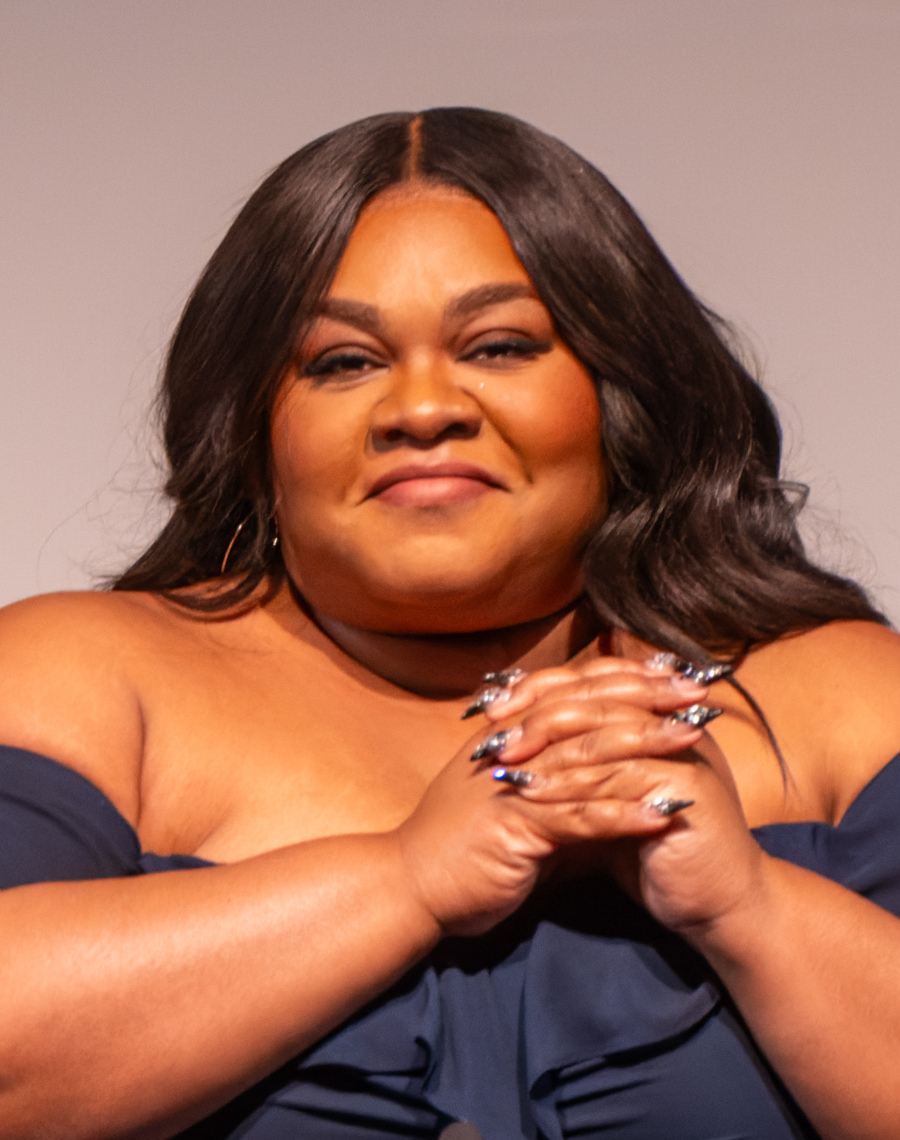
Da'Vine Joy Randolph, Best Supporting Actress winner

- Best Film:
  - Killers of the Flower Moon
- Best Director:
  - Christopher Nolan – Oppenheimer
- Best Actor:
  - Franz Rogowski – Passages
- Best Actress:
  - Lily Gladstone – Killers of the Flower Moon
- Best Supporting Actor:
  - Charles Melton – May December
- Best Supporting Actress:
  - Da'Vine Joy Randolph – The Holdovers
- Best Screenplay:
  - Samy Burch – May December
- Best Animated Film:
  - The Boy and the Heron
- Best Cinematography:
  - Hoyte van Hoytema – Oppenheimer
- Best Non-Fiction Film:
  - Menus-Plaisirs – Les Troisgros
- Best International Film:
  - Anatomy of a Fall • France
- Best First Film:
  - Past Lives
- Special Award:
  - Karen Cooper, "for her five decades of creative leadership as director of Film Forum"
- Special Mentions:
  - Cash prizes were awarded to two students focusing on film criticism/journalism attending college in the region:
    - Graduate – Katherine Prior (Brooklyn College)
    - Undergraduate – Mick Gaw (New York University)
