= The Gallerist (film) =

2026 dark comedy thriller film by Cathy Yan

- Theatrical release poster
- Directed by: Cathy Yan
- Written by: Cathy Yan; James Pedersen
- Produced by: Jonathan King; Ash Sarohia; Natalie Portman; Sophie Mas; Tom McCarthy; Rae Baron; Zola Elgart Glassman
- Starring: Natalie Portman; Jenna Ortega; Sterling K. Brown; Daniel Brühl; Charli XCX; Zach Galifianakis; Da'Vine Joy Randolph; Catherine Zeta-Jones
- Cinematography: Federico Cesca
- Edited by: Brian A. Kates
- Music by: Andrew Orkin; Joseph Shirley
- Production companies: MountainA; Concordia Studio; Slow Pony; MRC
- Distributed by: Roadside Attractions; Vertical
- Release dates: January 24, 2026 (Sundance); December 4, 2026
- Running time: 94 minutes
- Country: United States
- Language: English

The Gallerist is a 2026 American dark comedy thriller film directed by Cathy Yan and starring Natalie Portman, Jenna Ortega, Sterling K. Brown, Daniel Brühl, Charli XCX, Zach Galifianakis, Da'Vine Joy Randolph, and Catherine Zeta-Jones.

The film premiered at the 2026 Sundance Film Festival on January 24, 2026, and is scheduled for a theatrical release in the United States on December 4, 2026, by Roadside Attractions and Vertical and on streaming internationally by Netflix.

== Premise ==
Preparing for her Art Basel premiere, gallerist Polina Polinski hosts an early look for art influencer Dalton Hardberry to review emerging artist Stella Burgess. Dalton rains hate on Polina, Stella, and the entire gallery until he is impaled on the centerpiece — a large-scale sculpture entitled "The Emasculator". The "hyperrealist work" goes viral, attracting legendary dealer Marianne Gorman, who revs up the ruthless machine of the art world.

== Cast ==
- Natalie Portman as Polina Polinski, an uptight Miami gallerist and recent divorcée
- Jenna Ortega as Kiki Gorman, Polina's assistant
- Sterling K. Brown as Tom, a canned tuna tycoon and Polina's ex-husband
- Zach Galifianakis as Dalton Hardberry, a social media influencer
- Da'Vine Joy Randolph as Stella Burgess, an up-and-coming artist
- Catherine Zeta-Jones as Marianne Gorman, an art curator and Kiki's aunt
- Daniel Brühl as Cristos, a wannabe art collector
- Charli XCX as Alex Moreau, Dalton's girlfriend
- Youssef Kerkour as Doug

== Production ==
In October 2024, Natalie Portman and Jenna Ortega were set to star in The Gallerist, co-written and directed by Cathy Yan. In December, Da'Vine Joy Randolph, Sterling K. Brown, Zach Galifianakis, Daniel Brühl, Charli XCX, and Catherine Zeta-Jones joined the cast. The film was financed by MRC.

Principal photography began on December 18, 2024 and wrapped on February 6, 2025.

== Release ==
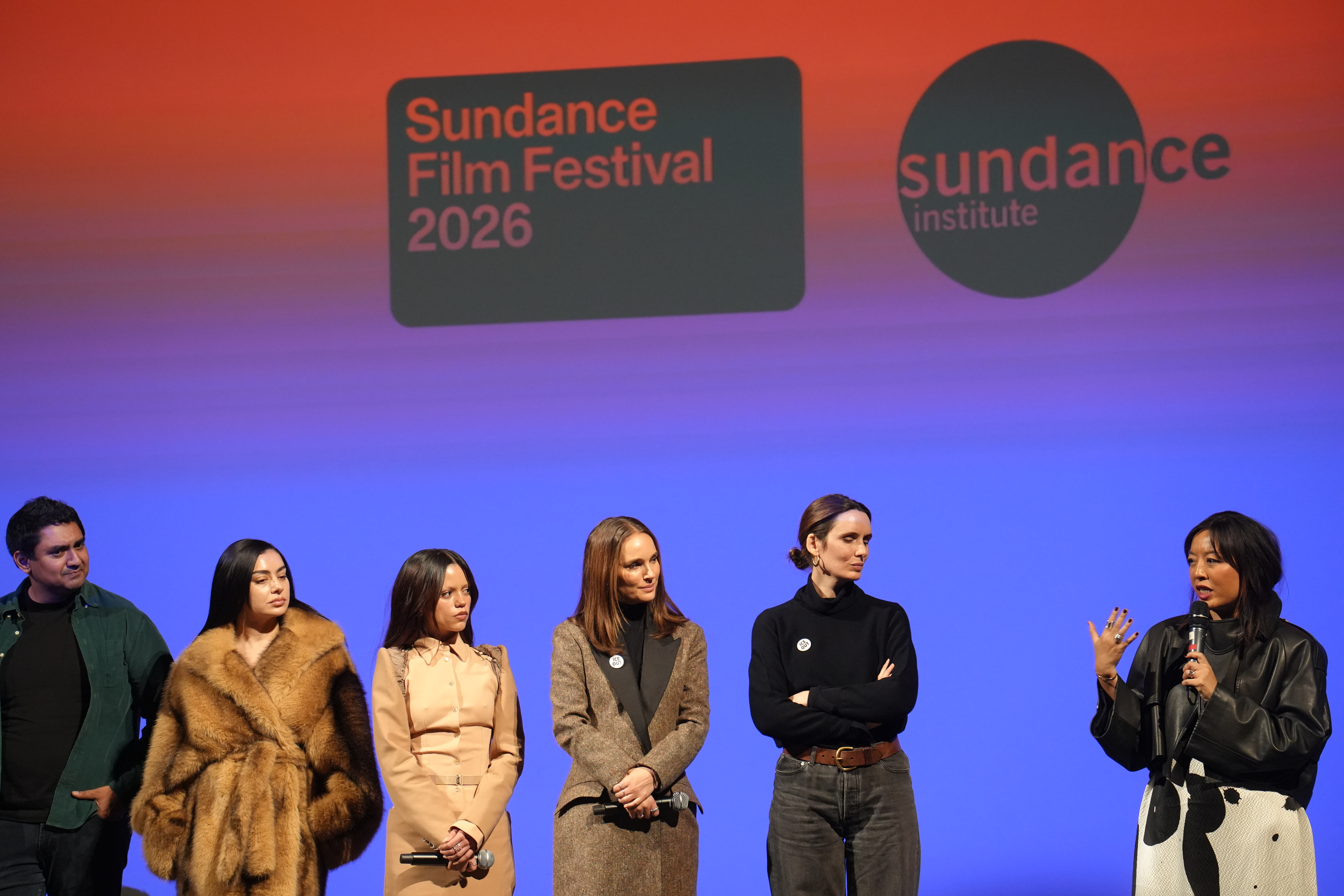
Cast and crew at the Q&A after The Gallerist Premiere at the 2026 Sundance Film Festival

The Gallerist premiered at the Eccles Theater as part of the 2026 Sundance Film Festival on January 24, 2026. In August 2026, Roadside Attractions and Vertical acquired U.S. distribution rights to the film, scheduling it for a theatrical release on December 4. In November 2026, it was revealed that Netflix had licensed exclusive international streaming rights to the film and would release it day-and-date with the United States; however, the film will not be listed as a Netflix original.

== Reception ==
On the review aggregator website Rotten Tomatoes, 55% of 40 critics' reviews are positive, with an average rating of 5.3/10. Metacritic, which uses a weighted average, assigned the film a score of 48 out of 100, based on 12 critics, indicating "mixed or average" reviews.

Vanity Fair described it as playful satire. The Hollywood Reporter called the film "clumsy and inert on screen". Variety described it as "intermittently clever". The Guardian called it "a major stumble".
