= Simon Stephenson =

Scottish screenwriter and author

Simon Stephenson is a Scottish screenwriter and author.

In March 2024, Variety reported that Stephenson had lodged a complaint against with the Writers Guild of America, alleging that David Hemingson's screenplay of the film The Holdovers plagiarized an unproduced script he wrote entitled Frisco. The validity of the claim was disputed by Frisco's producer.

== Books ==
- Set My Heart to Five
- Let Not the Waves of the Sea
- Sometimes People Die

== Filmography ==
Film

Year	Title	Writer	Producer	Notes
2017	Paddington 2	Additional material	No	
2021	Luca	Story	No	
2021	The Electrical Life of Louis Wain	Yes	Executive	
2023	Wonka	Additional material	No	

Television

- Eleventh Hour (2006, writer)
