= David Hemingson =

American producer and screenwriter

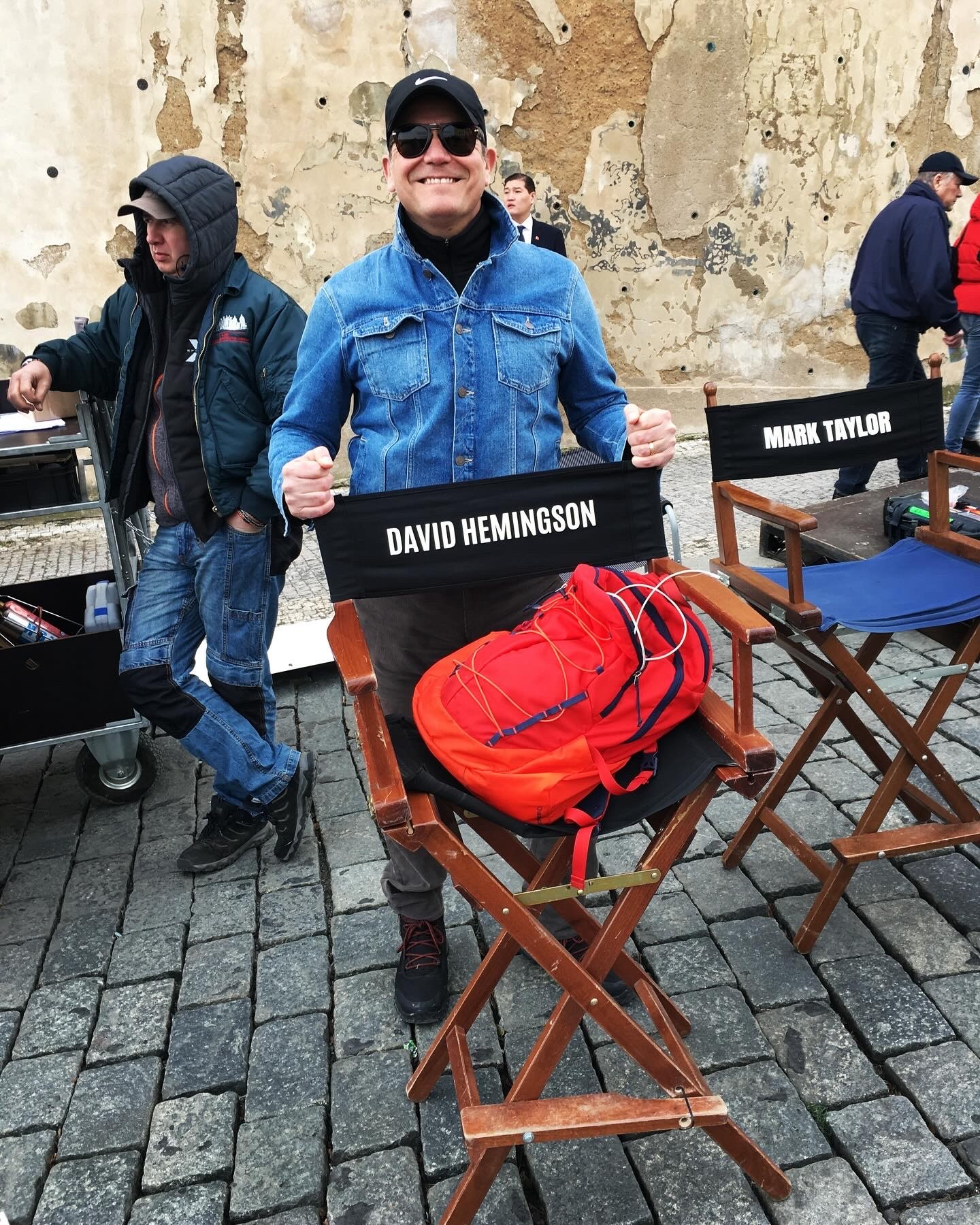
- Hemingson on the set of Whiskey Cavalier in Prague, 2019.
- Born: July 26, 1964 (age 62); New Haven, Connecticut, U.S.
- Education: Watkinson School; Yale University; Columbia Law School
- Occupations: Producer; screenwriter
- Spouse: Victoria Hemingson (m. 1998)
- Children: 2

David Hemingson (born July 26, 1964) is an American writer and producer for film and television. He is best known for writing the critically acclaimed film The Holdovers, which earned him an Academy Award nomination for Best Original Screenplay.

== Early life and education ==
Hemingson was born on July 26, 1964, in New Haven, Connecticut. His father worked both as a teacher and a merchant marine, while his mother was a nurse at Mount Sinai Hospital in Hartford, Connecticut. His parents divorced in 1969.

In 1982, Hemingson graduated from Watkinson School, a prep school in Hartford. His experiences in prep school, along with life lessons acquired from an uncle during his youth, informed Hemingson's screenplay for the 2023 Alexander Payne film The Holdovers.

Hemingson earned a bachelor's degree at Yale University and graduated from Columbia Law School in 1990. After graduation, he worked in the entertainment division of the Loeb & Loeb law firm in Los Angeles before deciding to pursue a writing career.

== Career ==
Hemingson's first role after leaving the legal field was as an assistant writer on Nickelodeon's The Adventures of Pete & Pete. In addition to his television writing career, Hemingson served as a producer on series such as Just Shoot Me!, Kitchen Confidential, The Deep End, Don't Trust the B— in Apartment 23, and Whiskey Cavalier. Hemigson is credited with creating The Deep End and Whiskey Cavalier. He adapted Kitchen Confidential from Anthony Bourdain's book.

In 2017, Hemingson wrote a pilot for a series set at a New England boarding school based on his own experiences at the Watkinson School. He was later contacted by director Alexander Payne, who wanted his next film to be set in a prep school environment. Hemingson adapted the pilot script into the screenplay for Payne's 2023 film The Holdovers.

In March 2024, Variety reported that screenwriter Simon Stephenson had contacted the Writers Guild of America alleging similarities between The Holdovers and Frisco, Stephenson's own unproduced screenplay. Frisco producer Tom McNulty questioned the validity of Stephenson's claim.

== Personal life ==
Hemingson married writer and actress Victoria Morsell in 1998. They reside in Los Angeles with their son and daughter.

== Filmography ==
Film

Year	Title	Writer	Producer
2023	The Holdovers	Yes	Yes

TV series

Year	Title	Writer	Producer	Creator	Notes
1995–1996	The Adventures of Pete and Pete	Yes	No	No	Wrote 2 episodes
1997–1998	101 Dalmatians: The Series	Yes	No	No	Wrote 9 episodes
1997–1999	Pepper Ann	Yes	No	No	Wrote 6 episodes
1998	Hercules	Yes	No	No	Wrote 2 episodes
1998–1999	For Your Love	Yes	No	No	Wrote 4 episodes
1999–2000	Jesse	Yes	Co-producer	No	Wrote 2 episodes
1999–2001	Angela Anaconda	Yes	No	No	Wrote 2 episodes
2000–2003	Just Shoot Me!	Yes	Co-executive	No	Wrote 11 episodes
2004–2006	Cracking Up	Yes	Co-executive	No	Wrote 1 episode
2005–2006	Kitchen Confidential	Yes	Executive	No	Wrote 2 episodes
2005–2008	American Dad!	Yes	Co-executive	No	Wrote 2 episodes
2007	How I Met Your Mother	Yes	No	No	Wrote 1 episode
2007–2008	Family Guy	No	Consulting	No	
2009	Lie to Me	No	Consulting	No	
2010	The Deep End	Yes	Executive	Yes	Wrote 3 episodes
2011	Traffic Light	Yes	Executive	No	Wrote 2 episodes
2012–2013	Don't Trust the B— in Apartment 23	Yes	Executive	No	Wrote 2 episodes
2014	Friends With Better Lives	Yes	Executive	No	Wrote 1 episode
2014	Bones	No	Consulting	No	5 episodes
2014–2015	Black-ish	Yes	Consulting	No	Wrote 1 episode
2016	Uncle Buck	Yes	Consulting	No	Wrote 1 episode
2016–2017	The Catch	Yes	Co-executive	No	Wrote 1 episode
2019	Whiskey Cavalier	Yes	Executive	Yes	Wrote 3 episodes
TBA	Everyone in My Family Has Killed Someone	Yes	Executive	Yes	

TV pilots

Year	Title	Writer	Executive Producer	Creator	Notes
2007	Two Dreadful Children	Yes	Yes	Yes	
2007	The Call	Yes	Yes	Yes	
2016	Chunk & Bean	No	Yes	No	

== Awards and nominations ==
Year	Award	Category	Title	Result	Ref.
2006	Writers Guild of America Awards	Episodic Comedy	Kitchen Confidential	Nominated	
2023	Michigan Movie Critics Guild	Best Screenplay	The Holdovers	Nominated	
2023	National Board of Review	Best Original Screenplay	The Holdovers	Won	
2023	Boston Society of Film Critics	Best Screenplay	The Holdovers	Won	
2023	Washington DC Area Film Critics Association	Best Original Screenplay	The Holdovers	Nominated	
2023	Chicago Film Critics Association	Best Original Screenplay	The Holdovers	Nominated	
2023	Phoenix Critics Circle	Best Screenplay	The Holdovers	Won	
2023	Boston Online Film Critics Association	Best Screenplay	The Holdovers	Won (Note: Tied with Samy Burch for May December)	
2023	Southeastern Film Critics Association	Best Original Screenplay	The Holdovers	Won	
2023	St. Louis Film Critics Association	Best Original Screenplay	The Holdovers	Runner-up	
2023	Indiana Film Journalists Association	Best Original Screenplay	The Holdovers	Won	
2023	North Texas Film Critics Association	Best Screenplay	The Holdovers	Won	
2023	Dallas-Fort Worth Film Critics Association	Best Screenplay	The Holdovers	Won	
2023	San Diego Film Critics Society	Best Original Screenplay	The Holdovers	Runner-up	
2023	Florida Film Critics Circle	Best Original Screenplay	The Holdovers	Nominated	
2023	Online Association of Female Film Critics	Best Original Screenplay	The Holdovers	Nominated	
2023	Nevada Film Critics Society	Best Original Screenplay	The Holdovers	Won	
2024	Alliance of Women Film Journalists	Best Original Screenplay	The Holdovers	Nominated	
2024	Columbus Film Critics Association	Best Original Screenplay	The Holdovers	Won	
2024	Georgia Film Critics Association	Best Original Screenplay	The Holdovers	Won	
2024	Astra Awards	Best Original Screenplay	The Holdovers	Nominated	
2024	Greater Western New York Film Critics Association	Best Original Screenplay	The Holdovers	Nominated	
2024	National Society of Film Critics	Best Screenplay	The Holdovers	Runner-up (Note: Tied with Celine Song for Past Lives.)	
2024	North Carolina Film Critics Association	Best Original Screenplay	The Holdovers	Nominated	
2024	Utah Film Critics Association	Best Original Screenplay	The Holdovers	Nominated	
2024	Seattle Film Critics Society	Best Screenplay	The Holdovers	Won	
2024	San Francisco Bay Area Film Critics Circle	Best Original Screenplay	The Holdovers	Nominated	
2024	Austin Film Critics Association	Best Original Screenplay	The Holdovers	Nominated	
2024	Denver Film Critics Society	Best Original Screenplay	The Holdovers	Nominated	
2024	Hawaii Film Critics Society	Best Screenplay	The Holdovers	Nominated	
2024	Critics' Choice Awards	Best Original Screenplay	The Holdovers	Nominated	
2024	Music City Film Critics Association	Best Screenplay	The Holdovers	Won	
2024	North Dakota Film Society	Best Screenplay	The Holdovers	Nominated	
2024	Portland Critics Association	Best Screenplay	The Holdovers	Nominated	
2024	British Academy of Film and Television Arts	Best Original Screenplay	The Holdovers	Nominated	
2024	Satellite Awards	Best Original Screenplay	The Holdovers	Nominated	
2024	Film Independent Spirit Awards	Best Screenplay	The Holdovers	Nominated	
2024	Academy Awards	Best Original Screenplay	The Holdovers	Nominated	
2024	Writers Guild of America Awards	Best Original Screenplay	The Holdovers	Won	
