= Da'Vine Joy Randolph =

American actress (born 1986)

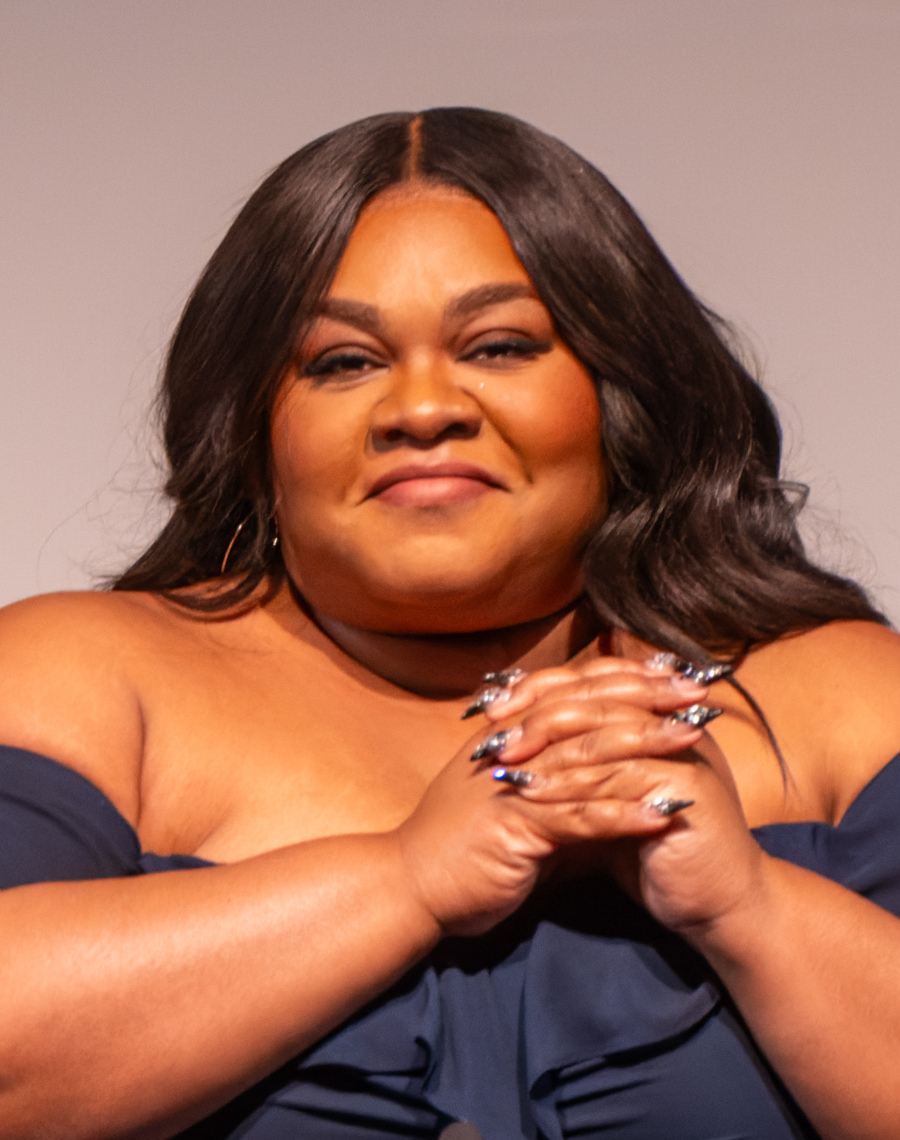
- Randolph in 2024
- Born: May 21, 1986 (age 40); Philadelphia, Pennsylvania, U.S.
- Education: Temple University (BFA); Yale University (MFA)
- Occupation: Actress
- Years active: 2011–present

Da'Vine Joy Randolph (/deɪˈvaɪn/; born May 21, 1986) is an American actress. She has earned various accolades including an Academy Award, British Academy Film Award and Golden Globe Award, alongside nominations for a Tony Award and a Primetime Emmy Award. In 2024, she was named one of 100 most influential people in the world by Time.

Randolph gained recognition for her portrayal of psychic Oda Mae Brown in the Broadway production of Ghost (2012), for which she received a nomination for the Tony Award for Best Featured Actress in a Musical. Randolph went on to appear in the films The Angriest Man in Brooklyn (2014) and Office Christmas Party (2016) before receiving praise for her roles in Dolemite Is My Name (2019) and The United States vs. Billie Holiday (2020). Her performance as a grieving mother in The Holdovers (2023) earned her several awards, including the Academy Award for Best Supporting Actress.

Randolph's television credits include Selfie (2014), This Is Us (2016), People of Earth (2016–17), Empire (2017–18), High Fidelity (2020), and The Idol (2023). In 2024, Randolph earned a nomination for the Primetime Emmy Award for Outstanding Guest Actress in a Comedy Series, for her appearances on the Hulu mystery series Only Murders in the Building (2021–present).

== Early life and education ==
Da'Vine Joy Randolph was born on May 21, 1986, in Philadelphia, Pennsylvania. Her first name is pronounced "Day Vine Joy"; she has no middle name. It took her parents seven years to have children. When Da'Vine was born, they said she was a "divine joy".

Randolph grew up in the Mount Airy neighborhood of Philadelphia. As a youth, she attended Interlochen Arts Camp, studying theatre. She went to Temple University to focus on classical vocal performance and opera, but switched to musical theatre in her junior year. After graduating from Temple in 2008, she attended the Yale School of Drama. She graduated from Yale in 2011 with her master's degree. Randolph became an alumna of the British American Drama Academy (BADA) after spending a summer studying Shakespeare at the University of Oxford.

== Career ==
Randolph auditioned for an understudy role in the Broadway transfer of Ghost: the Musical (which was playing in London's West End), but the producers decided to cast her in the principal role of Oda Mae Brown. Before the casting of the Broadway transfer was announced, Sharon D. Clarke, who played Oda Mae in the London run of Ghost the Musical, suffered a minor knee injury. Randolph was quickly flown to London to cover the role in Clarke's absence. Her debut performance took place on December 16, 2011, and she continued to share the role with understudy Lisa Davina Phillip until early January 2012, when Clarke returned.

After a preview period that began in March 2012, the Broadway production opened Monday April 23, 2012, with Randolph playing opposite Richard Fleeshman and Caissie Levy in the leading roles. She was nominated for the Tony Award for Best Featured Actress in a Musical. In 2013 she made her feature film debut in a supporting role, in Mother of George directed by Andrew Dosunmu. The film premiered at the 2013 Sundance Film Festival to positive reviews. The following year she played a nurse in the comedy-drama The Angriest Man in Brooklyn (2014) starring Robin Williams. Randolph rose to prominence acting in one of the main roles as Charmonique Whitaker in Selfie, which premiered on September 30, 2014. The show starred Karen Gillan and John Cho. It received mixed reviews and was canceled after one season, but the show continued to have a cult fan base. When asked about a Selfie revival in May 2022, Randolph responded that she would return in a movie or limited series if given the opportunity. She mentioned that it meant a lot to her and the cast, and that fans still talk about the series years after it aired. Randolph commented that she loved working on the show and that her character was one of her favorite roles.

From 2015 to 2017, Randolph performed a voice role as Christine in the series The Mr. Peabody & Sherman Show. She also had guest roles on The Good Wife (2013), See Dad Run (2014), Life in Pieces (2015), and Veep (2017). She had a recurring role as Tanya in the drama series This Is Us (2016). The same year, she had a part in Office Christmas Party (2016). She starred in one of the main roles as Yvonne Watson, a postal worker, in the sitcom People of Earth for two seasons from 2016 to 2017. She had recurring roles in the series Empire from 2017 to 2018 and in the series On Becoming a God in Central Florida in 2019.

She had her breakout role as Lady Reed in Dolemite Is My Name (2019) starring Eddie Murphy. For her performance she received nominations for the African-American Film Critics Association, Black Reel Awards, and NAACP Image Awards for Best Supporting Actress. The following year, she acted in Kajillionaire (2020), and she was a main cast member in High Fidelity (2020). During this time, she took voice roles as Ranger Woolf in Madagascar: A Little Wild from 2020 to 2022, Tamarind Toucan in Tuca & Bertie (2021), Detective Gail Johnson in Ultra City Smiths (2021), Tina in Chicago Party Aunt from 2021 to 2022, and various roles in Birdgirl (2022). She also voiced roles in the animated films Trolls World Tour (2020) and Puss in Boots: The Last Wish (2022).

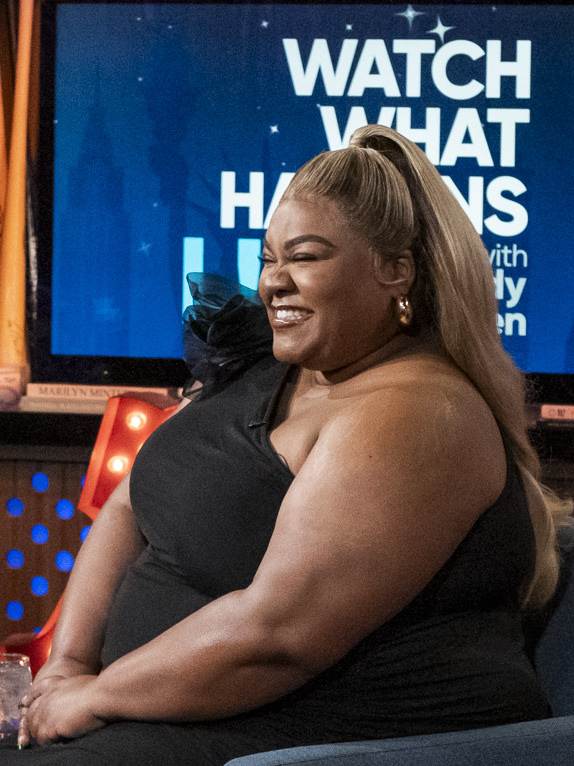
Randolph in 2024

She took roles in the drama film The United States vs. Billie Holiday (2021) and the comedy The Lost City (2022). In 2021. she took a main role in the sitcom The Last O.G. (2021). Since 2021, she has taken a recurring role as Detective Williams in the series Only Murders in the Building starring Steve Martin, Martin Short, and Selena Gomez. She played a manager to a pop star in the controversial series The Idol (2023).

In 2023, she played gospel singer Mahalia Jackson in the political drama film Rustin. She also starred in Alexander Payne's coming-of-age film The Holdovers as Mary Lamb, a cook and bereaved mother. The film premiered at the Telluride Film Festival. She earned praise for the role, with Pete Hammond of Deadline Hollywood writing "Randolph is simply wonderful, saying more with a look than any words could ever do. She is enormously touching and earns our tears along the way." Randolph received numerous nominations and awards for the role, including winning the Golden Globe Award for Best Supporting Actress, the BAFTA, the Screen Actors Guild Award for Outstanding Performance by a Female Actor in a Supporting Role, and the Academy Award for Best Supporting Actress.

Randolph filmed an action comedy film with Rebel Wilson called Bride Hard, which was released in June 2025. In September 2025, Randolph appeared in the Bi-ray music video "Butterfly (Narrative Version)" directed by Japanese rock star Yoshiki. She then starred as afterlife coordinator Anna in A24's fantasy romantic comedy Eternity alongside Elizabeth Olsen, Miles Teller, and Callum Turner. Her next film, The Gallerist, premiered at the 2026 Sundance Film Festival and will be followed by a theatrical release later in the year.

== Filmography ==
=== Film ===
Year	Title	Role	Notes
2013	Mother of George	Marsea	
2013	The Purge: The Morning After	De'Shondranique	short
2013	A Long Walk	Mom	short
2014	The Angriest Man in Brooklyn	Nurse Rowan	
2016	The Secrets of Emily Blair	Fran	
2016	Office Christmas Party	Carla	
2019	Dolemite Is My Name	Lady Reed	
2020	Kajillionaire	Jenny	
2020	The Last Shift	Shazz	
2020	Trolls World Tour	Bliss Marina / Shelia B	voice
2020	Mama Got A Cough	Yolanda	video short
2021	The United States vs. Billie Holiday	Roslyn	
2021	The Guilty	CHP Dispatcher	voice
2022	The Lost City	Beth Hatten	
2022	On the Come Up	Pooh	
2022	A Little White Lie	Delta Jones	
2022	Puss in Boots: The Last Wish	Mama Luna	voice
2023	Rustin	Mahalia Jackson	
2023	The Holdovers	Mary Lamb	
2024	Golden	—N/a	Unreleased
2025	Shadow Force	"Auntie" / Marvella Owens	
2025	Bride Hard	Lydia	
2025	Eternity	Anna	
2026	The Gallerist	Stella Burgess	
TBA	Dedicated to Morris Burke	Judy Brooks	Filming

Key
†	Denotes films that have not yet been released

=== Television ===
Year	Title	Role	Notes
2013	The Good Wife	Margie	Episode: "A More Perfect Union"
2013	Brenda Forever	Pearl	Television film
2014	See Dad Run	Mrs. Rothschild	Episode: "See Dad Become Room Mom"
2014	Selfie	Charmonique Whitaker	Main cast
2015	Life in Pieces	Janice	Episode: "Babe Secret Phone Germs"
2015–2017	The Mr. Peabody & Sherman Show	Christine / Abby Fisher	Voice, main cast
2016	This Is Us	Tanya	Recurring cast (season 1)
2016–2017	People of Earth	Yvonne Watson	Main cast
2017	Veep	Roberta Winston	Episode: "Qatar"
2017–2018	Empire	Poundcake	Recurring cast (season 4)
2018	Home: Adventures with Tip & Oh	Crushtina	Voice, episode: "Like Mother, Like Pit of Fire"
2019	On Becoming a God in Central Florida	Rhonda	Recurring cast
2020	High Fidelity	Cherise	Main cast
2020–2022	Madagascar: A Little Wild	Ranger Hoof	Voice, recurring cast
2021	Cinema Toast	Vivian	Voice, episode: "Kiss, Marry, Kill"
2021	Tuca & Bertie	Tamarind Toucan	Voice, 2 episodes
2021	Ultra City Smiths	Detective Gail Johnson	Voice, main cast
2021	The Last O.G.	Veesy	Main cast (season 4)
2021–present	Only Murders in the Building	Detective Williams	Recurring cast
2021–2022	Chicago Party Aunt	Tina	Voice, main cast
2022	Birdgirl	Various voices	Recurring cast
2023	The Idol	Destiny	Recurring cast

=== Theatre ===
List of stage performances
Year	Title	Role	Notes
2007	Hair	Tribe	Prince Music Theater; May 26, 2007 – June 17, 2007
2010	The Servant of Two Masters	Clarice	Yale Repertory Theatre; March 12, 2010 – April 3, 2010
2012	Ghost: The Musical	Oda Mae Brown	Lunt-Fontanne Theatre; April 23, 2012 – August 18, 2012
2013	The Cradle Will Rock	Performer	New York City Center; July 10, 2013 – July 13, 2013

== Awards and nominations ==
Award ceremony	Year	Category	Nominee / Work	Result
AACTA International Awards	2024	Best Supporting Actress	The Holdovers	Nominated
Academy Awards	2024	Best Supporting Actress	The Holdovers	Won
AAFCA Awards	2020	Best Supporting Actress	Dolemite Is My Name	Won
Astra Film Awards	2024	Best Supporting Actress	The Holdovers	Won
Austin Film Critics Association	2020	Breakthrough Artist Award	Dolemite Is My Name	Nominated
Black Reel Awards	2020	Outstanding Supporting Actress	Dolemite Is My Name	Won
Black Reel Awards	2020	Outstanding Breakthrough Performance	Dolemite Is My Name	Won
Black Reel Awards	2022	Outstanding Guest Actress, Comedy Series	Only Murders in the Building	Nominated
Black Reel Awards	2024	Outstanding Supporting Performance	The Holdovers	Nominated
Boston Society of Film Critics	2023	Best Supporting Actress	The Holdovers	Won
British Academy Film Awards	2024	Best Supporting Actress	The Holdovers	Won
Celebration of Cinema & Television	2023	Supporting Actress Award (Film)	The Holdovers	Won
Chicago Film Critics Association	2023	Best Supporting Actress	The Holdovers	Won
Critics' Choice Awards	2024	Best Supporting Actress	The Holdovers	Won
Critics' Choice Awards	2024	Best Acting Ensemble	The Holdovers	Nominated
Dallas–Fort Worth Film Critics Association	2023	Best Supporting Actress	The Holdovers	Won
Drama League Awards	2012	Distinguished Performance	Ghost: The Musical	Nominated
Florida Film Critics Circle	2023	Best Supporting Actress	The Holdovers	Nominated
Georgia Film Critics Association	2024	Best Supporting Actress	The Holdovers	Won
Georgia Film Critics Association	2024	Best Ensemble	The Holdovers	Runner-up
Golden Globe Awards	2024	Best Supporting Actress – Motion Picture	The Holdovers	Won
Gotham Awards	2023	Outstanding Supporting Performance	The Holdovers	Nominated
Independent Spirit Awards	2024	Best Supporting Performance	The Holdovers	Won
Kansas City Film Critics Circle	2019	Best Supporting Actress	Dolemite Is My Name	Won
London Film Critics' Circle	2024	Supporting Actress of the Year	The Holdovers	Won
Los Angeles Film Critics Association	2023	Best Supporting Performer	The Holdovers	Won (Note: shared with Rachel McAdams for Are You There God? It's Me, Margaret.)
NAACP Image Awards	2020	Outstanding Supporting Actress in a Motion Picture	Dolemite Is My Name	Nominated
NAACP Image Awards	2024	Outstanding Supporting Actress in a Motion Picture	The Holdovers	Nominated
National Board of Review	2023	Best Supporting Actress	The Holdovers	Won
New York Film Critics Circle	2023	Best Supporting Actress	The Holdovers	Won
New York Film Critics Online	2023	Best Supporting Actress	The Holdovers	Won
Outer Critics Circle Awards	2012	Outstanding Featured Actress in a Musical	Ghost: The Musical	Nominated
Palm Springs International Film Festival	2024	Breakthrough Performance Award	The Holdovers	Won
Primetime Emmy Awards	2024	Outstanding Guest Actress in a Comedy Series	Only Murders in the Building	Nominated
San Diego Film Critics Society	2023	Best Supporting Actress	The Holdovers	Runner-up
San Diego Film Critics Society	2023	Best Ensemble	The Holdovers	Won
San Diego Film Critics Society	2025	Best Comedic Performance	Eternity	Won
Santa Barbara International Film Festival	2024	Virtuoso Award	The Holdovers	Won
Satellite Awards	2024	Best Supporting Actress – Motion Picture	The Holdovers	Won
Screen Actors Guild Awards	2024	Outstanding Performance by a Female Actor in a Supporting Role	The Holdovers	Won
St. Louis Film Critics Association	2023	Best Supporting Actress	The Holdovers	Won
St. Louis Film Critics Association	2023	Best Ensemble	The Holdovers	Won (Note: Shared with the cast of The Holdovers)
Tony Awards	2012	Best Featured Actress in a Musical	Ghost: The Musical	Nominated
Toronto Film Critics Association	2023	Best Supporting Performance	The Holdovers	Won (Note: shared with Ryan Gosling for Barbie.)
Washington D.C. Area Film Critics Association	2023	Best Supporting Actress	The Holdovers	Won
Washington D.C. Area Film Critics Association	2023	Best Acting Ensemble	The Holdovers	Nominated

== See also ==
- List of people nominated for the Triple Crown of Acting
- List of black Academy Award winners and nominees – Best Supporting Actress
