= Denver Film Critics Society =

The Denver Film Critics Society (DFCS) is an American film critic organization founded in 2009. The professional association of film journalists reporting across the print, radio, television, and online media sectors presents annual awards for achievements in filmmaking. Their roster includes a diverse collection of voices celebrating cinema in the Rocky Mountain region.

== Awards ==
Each year since 2010, the DFCS has presented their annual awards. Award categories include::

- Best Film
- Best Director
- Best Cinematography
- Best Lead Performance by an Actor, Female
- Best Lead Performance by an Actor, Male
- Best Supporting Performance by an Actor, Female
- Best Supporting Performance by an Actor, Male
- Best Ensemble
- Best Non-live-action Performance
- Best Stunts
- Best Sci-Fi
- Best Horror
- Best Animated Film
- Best Comedy
- Best Visual Effects
- Best Sound
- Best Original Screenplay
- Best Adapted Screenplay
- Best Documentary Feature
- Best Original Song
- Best Original Score
- Best Non-English Language Feature

Nominations are announced in January, with the winners released later in the month. DFCS winners are included among industry aggregators like Gold Derby and Rotten Tomatoes as a precursor for the Academy Awards. Previous winners of the society's Best Film award have included Gravity, Moonlight, Lady Bird, Roma, Oppenheimer, and Dune: Part Two. The society's awards have also marked early-season wins for performers in their respective categories. In 2020, Ellen Burstyn won Best Supporting Actress for Pieces of a Woman, earning her first win of the season. In 2021, J. K. Simmons received his first Best Supporting Actor award of the season for Being the Ricardos prior to an Academy Award nomination for his role as William Frawley.

=== Past Winners ===
2025
| Category | Winner |
|---|---|
| Best Film | Sinners |
| Best Director | Ryan Coogler (Sinners) |
| Best Cinematography | Autumn Durald Arkapaw (Sinners) |
| Best Lead Performance by an Actor, Female | Jessie Buckley (Hamnet) |
| Best Lead Performance by an Actor, Male | Timothée Chalamet (Marty Supreme) |
| Best Supporting Performance by an Actor, Female | Amy Madigan (Weapons) |
| Best Supporting Performance by an Actor, Male | Benicio Del Toro (One Battle After Another) |
| Best Ensemble | Sinners |
| Best Non-live-action Performance | Oona Chaplin (Avatar: Fire and Ash) |
| Best Stunts | Mission: Impossible – The Final Reckoning |
| Best Sci-Fi | Bugonia |
| Best Horror | Sinners |
| Best Animated Film | KPop Demon Hunters |
| Best Comedy | Wake Up Dead Man |
| Best Visual Effects | Avatar: Fire and Ash |
| Best Sound | F1: The Movie |
| Best Original Screenplay | Sinners |
| Best Adapted Screenplay | One Battle After Another |
| Best Documentary Feature | The Perfect Neighbor |
| Best Original Song | “Golden” from KPop Demon Hunters |
| Best Original Score | Ludwig Göransson Sinners |
| Best Non-English Language Feature | Sentimental Value |
