= The Holdovers =

2023 film by Alexander Payne

- Theatrical release poster
- Directed by: Alexander Payne
- Written by: David Hemingson
- Produced by: Mark Johnson; Bill Block; David Hemingson
- Starring: Paul Giamatti; Da'Vine Joy Randolph; Dominic Sessa
- Cinematography: Eigil Bryld
- Edited by: Kevin Tent
- Music by: Mark Orton
- Production companies: Miramax; Gran Via
- Distributed by: Focus Features
- Release dates: August 31, 2023 (Telluride); October 27, 2023 (United States)
- Running time: 133 minutes
- Country: United States
- Language: English
- Budget: $13 million
- Box office: $46 million

The Holdovers is a 2023 American Christmas comedy drama film directed by Alexander Payne, written by David Hemingson, and starring Paul Giamatti, Da'Vine Joy Randolph, and Dominic Sessa in his film debut. Set in 1970, it tells the story of a strict classics teacher at a New England boarding school who is forced to chaperone a handful of students who have nowhere to go during the school's Christmas holiday break. Filming took place from January to March 2022 in Massachusetts. The Holdovers premiered at the 50th Telluride Film Festival on August 31, 2023, and was released in the United States by Focus Features on October 27, 2023.

The film received critical acclaim and grossed $46 million. It was named one of the top 10 films of 2023 by the National Board of Review and the American Film Institute, and received many other accolades, including two wins at the Golden Globe Awards and the British Academy Film Awards; Randolph won the Best Supporting Actress award at both ceremonies. It also received five nominations at the 96th Academy Awards, including Best Picture and Best Actor for Giamatti; Randolph won the Academy Award for Best Supporting Actress.

== Plot ==
In mid-December 1970, Paul Hunham is a classics teacher at Barton Academy, a New England all-male boarding school that he once attended on scholarship. His students and fellow teachers despise him for his strict grading and stubborn personality. Dr. Woodrup, Barton's headmaster and Hunham's former student, scolds him for costing the academy money by flunking a major donor's son, causing Princeton University to rescind the boy's offer of admission.

When another teacher becomes unavailable for the duty, Hunham is forced to supervise five students left on campus during the Christmas holiday break, including Angus Tully, whose mother has cancelled a family trip to Saint Kitts in order to honeymoon with her new husband. Also staying behind is cafeteria manager Mary Lamb, whose late son Curtis attended Barton and recently died in the Vietnam War after being drafted. Unlike most Barton students, Curtis did not get a student deferment because he could not afford to go to college, and was only able to attend the school because of his mother’s job.

To the students' chagrin, Hunham forces them to study and exercise during the break. After six days, one student's wealthy father arrives by helicopter and agrees to take all five students on the family's ski trip with their parents' permission. Angus, unable to reach his parents for permission, is left alone at Barton with Hunham and Mary.

When Hunham catches Angus trying to book a hotel room, they argue about Hunham's disciplinarian policies. Angus runs through the school halls and defiantly leaps into a pile of gym equipment, dislocating his shoulder. Hunham takes him to the hospital. To protect his teacher from blame, Angus lies to the doctors about the circumstances of his injury.

At a restaurant, Hunham and Angus encounter Lydia Crane, Woodrup's assistant, who is fond of Hunham and invites the pair to her Christmas Eve party. Angus, Hunham, Mary, and Barton's janitor Danny attend Lydia's party. There, Angus is taken with Lydia's niece Elise, but Hunham discovers that Lydia has a boyfriend. As Mary gets drunk and has an emotional breakdown over Curtis's death, Hunham insists on leaving early. As he and Angus argue, the teen says that his father is dead and Mary scolds Hunham for his lack of empathy. Feeling remorseful, Hunham arranges a small Christmas celebration. Mary persuades him to grant Angus's wish for a "field trip" to Boston. After dropping off Mary in Roxbury to spend time with her pregnant sister, Angus and Hunham walk through Boston, ice skate and visit the Museum of Fine Arts.

The two encounter a classmate of Hunham's from Harvard College, who has become a successful academic. Embarrassed, Hunham lies about his career, and Angus plays along. Angus learns that Hunham was expelled from Harvard after a legacy donor's son plagiarized his work and then framed him, causing Hunham to semi-deliberately hit him with a car. Although the incident nearly ruined Hunham's career prospects, his old Barton headmaster took pity on him and offered him an adjunct teaching job.

When Hunham and Angus see the film Little Big Man at the Orpheum Theatre, Angus sneaks away and Hunham catches him entering a taxi. The teen explains that he wants to see his father, and Hunham agrees to accompany him, assuming that they are going to a cemetery. However, Angus's father is alive and confined in a psychiatric hospital.

Following the visit, Angus (who takes medication for depression) expresses his fear that he will grow up to become like his father. Hunham comforts him, affirming that Angus is not the same person as his father. Hunham, Angus, Mary and Danny celebrate New Year's Eve together.

In January 1971, when school resumes, Hunham is summoned to Woodrup's office, to respond to a complaint from Angus's mother and stepfather. They say that Angus is not allowed to see his father and that a snowglobe Angus had given him led to a violent incident at the hospital. Angus's mother and stepfather threaten to withdraw Angus from Barton and send him to a military academy. Hunham defends Angus and blames himself, claiming that the visit was his idea. Woodrup allows Angus to remain at Barton while firing Hunham, who steals expensive cognac from Woodrup's office as he leaves.

Mary, trying to come to terms with Curtis's death, gives Hunham a notebook for the monograph he wants to write. Hunham and Angus share a heartfelt handshake as they say goodbye to each other. In his car, Hunham takes a sip of the cognac, spits it out toward the school, and drives away.

== Cast ==
- Paul Giamatti as Paul Hunham, a classics teacher at the Barton Academy boarding school, unpopular among students and colleagues alike. He claims to suffer from trimethylaminuria and hyperhidrosis.
- Dominic Sessa as Angus Tully, a Barton student "held over" (i.e., left on campus) during Christmas break
- Da'Vine Joy Randolph as Mary Lamb, Barton cafeteria manager and bereaved mother
- Carrie Preston as Miss Lydia Crane, assistant to Barton headmaster Dr. Woodrup
- Andrew Garman as Dr. Hardy Woodrup, the headmaster of Barton Academy and Hunham's former student
- Gillian Vigman as Judy Clotfelter, Angus's mother
- Tate Donovan as Stanley Clotfelter, Angus's stepfather
- Brady Hepner as Teddy Kountze, Angus's enemy; one of the five holdovers
- Ian Dolley as Alex Ollerman, a member of The Church of Jesus Christ of Latter-day Saints; one of the five holdovers
- Jim Kaplan as Ye-Joon Park, an international student from Korea; one of the five holdovers
- Michael Provost as Jason Smith, the Barton football team's quarterback; one of the five holdovers
- Stephen Thorne as Thomas Tully, Angus's institutionalized father
- Naheem Garcia as Danny, Barton's janitor
- Darby Lily Lee-Stack as Elise, Angus's romantic interest and Lydia's niece
- Kelly AuCoin as Hugh Cavanaugh, Paul's former Harvard classmate
- Colleen Clinton as Mrs. Cavanaugh, Hugh's wife

== Production ==
=== Development ===
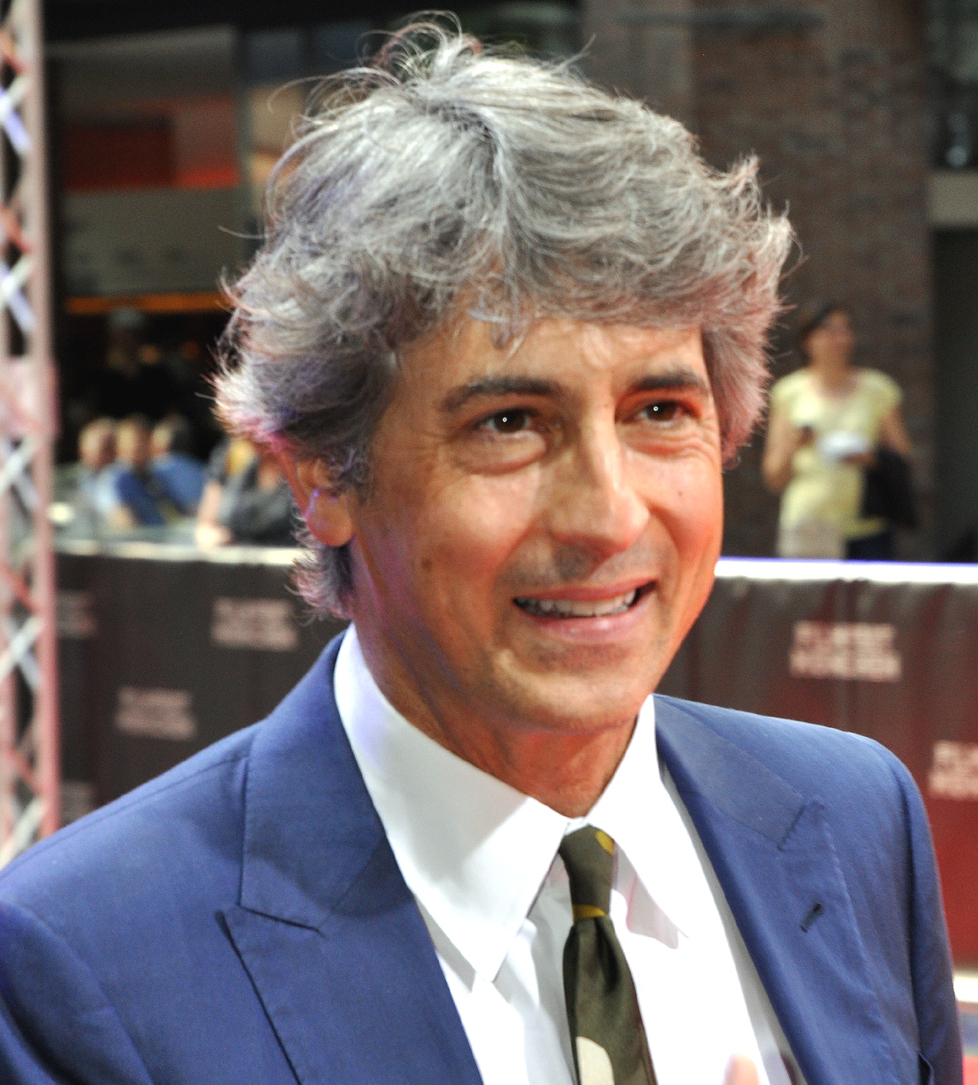
Director Alexander Payne

The Holdovers is the second collaboration between director Alexander Payne and actor Paul Giamatti after Sideways (2004). Payne conceived it after watching Marcel Pagnol's 1935 film Merlusse, and contacted screenwriter David Hemingson, whose boarding-school television pilot he had read.

In 2018, Hemingson was running his show, Whiskey Cavalier for ABC and was surprised to receive a call from Payne. The television pilot, Stonehaven, was set in present time, but Payne suggested a film using an older setting instead like 1958 or 1970. Hemingson agreed on 1970 because it had more in common with the present time and 1958 was too close to Dead Poets Society's timeline. In 2024, Hemingson revealed that the film is partially semi-autobiographical, with some of the dialogue and scenes taken verbatim from his own life, such as words from his own real-life uncle. The scene with the sex worker was inspired by a real-life incident that he said actually "happened to me on First Avenue and 30th Street with [my uncle] when I was seven years old. This woman walked up on an incredibly cold day and solicited and said, 'The kid can wait around the corner.' That is an actual incident from my life. The cherries jubilee thing is something that happened to me with my mother. So many of the things in the movie are just a love letter to my mom and my uncle and my dad." In June 2021, Miramax acquired the distribution rights. In early 2022, Da'Vine Joy Randolph and Carrie Preston joined the cast.

=== Filming ===
Filming began in Massachusetts on January 27, 2022, and wrapped in late March. Location manager Kai Quinlan, who had worked on other films set in New England like Spotlight and Black Mass, drew on her Massachusetts upbringing for the film. Similarly, Giamatti drew on his experience attending Choate Rosemary Hall in the 1980s, including his memories of a strict teacher whom he described as "not a happy man." To create the fictional Barton Academy, the film crew shot on location at five real-life Massachusetts schools: Groton School (the chapel and the Nashua River), Northfield Mount Hermon School (the chapel and building exteriors), Deerfield Academy (the front lawn and building exteriors), St. Mark's School (the dining hall, gymnasium, and headmaster's office), and Fairhaven High School (the study hall and auditorium). To play prep school student Angus, Payne cast Deerfield student Dominic Sessa; it was Sessa's first film role. The film crew also shot at the historic Somerville and Orpheum theatres and on the Boston Common. Payne later said that capturing the 1970s aesthetic was relatively easy because "change comes slowly to New England".

=== Special effects ===
One of the film's plot points involves Paul Hunham's amblyopia (sometimes called lazy eye), one of several health problems the character suffers from. To create the illusion that actor Paul Giamatti had this condition, the makeup and effects artist Cristina Patterson was hired to create special hand-painted soft contact lenses for the actor. Patterson told Vanity Fair writer Katey Rich that each lens required multiple attempts to get the color correct. Originally, Giamatti was to wear a lens only in his left eye, but after filming began, director Alexander Payne decided that he wanted to be able to create the effect in either of Giamatti's eyes so that the character's condition would be apparent with a variety of camera angles and shots. Rich reported that Payne "wanted to keep the audience guessing about which eye was the 'right' one, just as Angus Tully does." When Giamatti was wearing one of the lenses, he was unable to see out of the eye wearing the lens. Giamatti told Vanity Fair that "adjusting to the ways the lens limited me physically gave me a lot to work with imaginatively that I can’t even articulate. And I suppose the eye is one factor among several that makes Paul Hunham feel like he’s kind of an outsider."

=== Cinematography and post-production ===
To make the film look and feel like it was actually made during the 1970s, Alexander Payne hired Eigil Bryld to serve as cinematographer and camera operator. On being selected, Bryld remarked, "There's a sense of a spirit of the '70s movies — breaking away from your studios. And all the DPs of the period that I really admired would push the film stock or they would do handheld or whatever. And then I started thinking, 'That's really what I should be going for.'" Both digital and film formats were tested prior to filming, before it was decided to shoot the film digitally with an Arri Alexa with Panavision H series lenses, particularly a 55mm lens, creating a "vintage portrait look." "It's a movie about people who are forced into the frame together, and they don't necessarily want to be in the same frame," Bryld added. "Gradually over time, they come together more and more ... And that was one arc we were looking for — how we would reflect that, how we framed it and where we put the camera." Film emulation and color grading were added to the footage during post-production to complete the look.

External videos
- The opening Focus Features and Miramax logo variants from the film via YouTube; also includes the 1963 Universal Pictures logo shown on international and most home media releases (but not the 2024 Shout! Studios Ultra HD Blu-ray release).

The crew added to the film's 1970s stylization by creating a retro-style title card and logo variants for Focus Features and Miramax to open the film. Graphic designer Nate Carlson, who worked with Payne on Election (1999), was responsible for creating these, using the film's color palette from the set designs and visual style, as well as inspiration from the way film studio logos looked in the 1970s, to make them look as authentic and true to the time period as possible. Although the film's international prints (distributed by Universal Pictures) could simply use the 1963 Universal logo to open the film, neither Focus Features nor Miramax (the American distributor and production company) existed in the 1970s, so Carlson had to invent an original symbol for Focus Features (that involved lowercase "ff" initials with animated text moving into place on a red background) and a looped zoom-in animation for Miramax. Film emulsion was then added to make the logos look realistic for the time period. Miramax was so enthusiastic about Carlson's take on their logo that it hired him to design the studio's new permanent logo for their future films, debuting with Operation Fortune: Ruse de Guerre (2023) and The Beekeeper (2024). For the film's title card, Carlson kept things simple, using a custom font of his own design while staying in line with Payne's vision. He also designed the crest for Barton Academy and created two versions, one dating back to the 1800s to reflect its history and a modern, updated version.

=== Music ===
Original music for The Holdovers was composed by Mark Orton. Peter Krasinski was the Choral Music Arranger, Organist providing on-screen music ten minutes into the movie, and Off-Screen Music Advisor, in addition to his on-screen role as the Choir Leader directing singers in "O Little Town of Bethlehem" and whose voice opens the movie. The soundtrack also features several classic Christmas songs, and other songs from the 1970s by The Allman Brothers Band, Tony Orlando and Dawn, Labi Siffre, Badfinger, Shocking Blue, Damien Jurado, Herb Alpert, Gene Autry, Temptations, Chet Baker, Artie Shaw, and Cat Stevens. A piece used in the score is by the band Khruangbin. The soundtrack was released digitally by Back Lot Music on November 10, 2023, and on compact disc and vinyl on November 17.

== Release ==
A special screening of the film was held for buyers on September 11, 2022. The next day, it was reported that Focus Features had acquired distribution rights outside the Middle East and Turkey for $30 million. The film was scheduled for a limited theatrical release on November 10, 2023, followed by a wide release on November 22. However, it was pushed up to a limited release on October 27, followed by a wide release on November 10. It released in the United Kingdom on January 19, 2024.

The Holdovers's world premiere was at the 50th Telluride Film Festival on August 31, 2023. It also screened at the 2023 Toronto International Film Festival on September 10, 2023, where it was runner-up for the People's Choice Award. It was also invited to the 28th Busan International Film Festival's 'Icon' section, where it was shown on October 7, 2023, and had its European Premiere at the 67th BFI London Film Festival on October 11, 2023.

=== Home media ===
The Holdovers was released on digital platforms on November 30, 2023, followed by a Blu-ray and DVD release by Universal Pictures Home Entertainment on January 2, 2024. It was released on Ultra HD Blu-ray in the United Kingdom by Dazzler Media on April 22, 2024, and in the United States by Shout! Studios on December 17, 2024.

== Reception ==
=== Box office ===
The Holdovers grossed $20.4 million in the United States and Canada and $25.6 million in other territories for a worldwide total of $46 million.

The film made $211,093 from six theaters in its opening weekend, an average of $35,082 per venue. It expanded to 64 theaters in its second weekend, making $599,833. It then made $3.2 million from 778 theaters in its third weekend. Continuing to expand, it made $2.7 million in both its fourth and fifth weekends. Following its five Oscar nominations, the film expanded from 127 theaters to 1,262 in its 14th week of release and made $520,000, an increase of 568% from the previous weekend.

=== Critical response ===
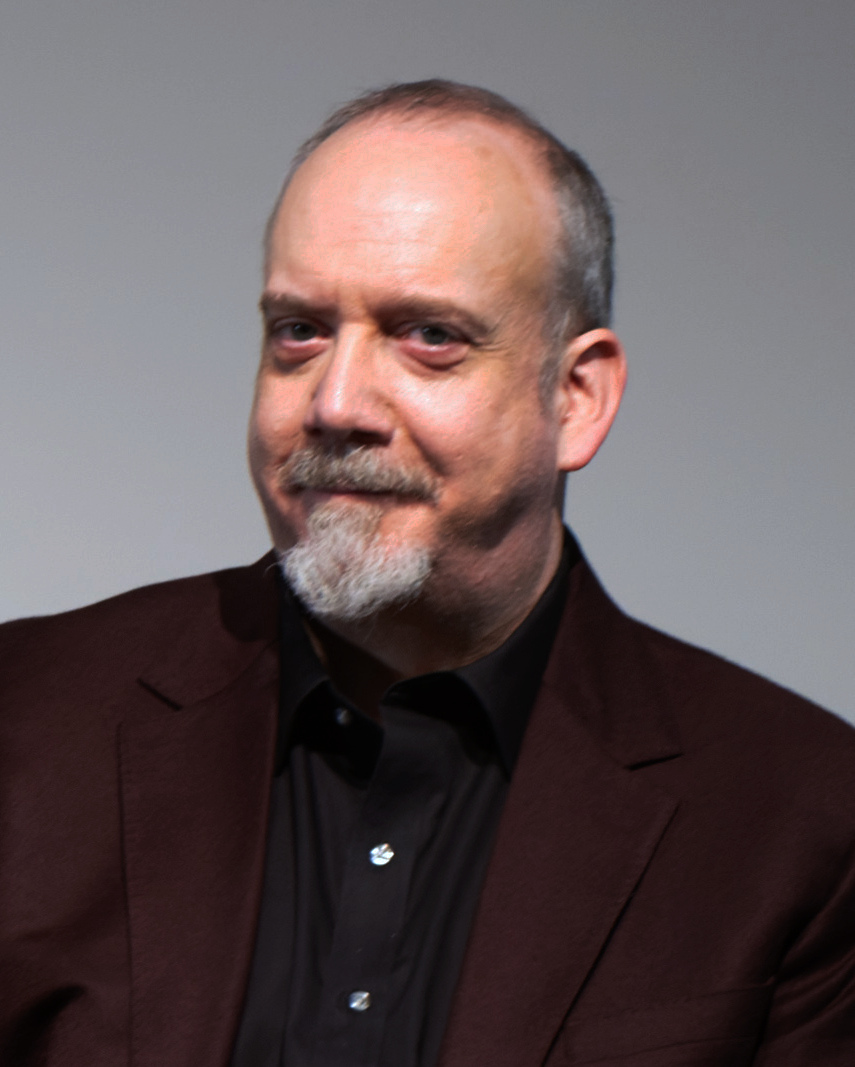
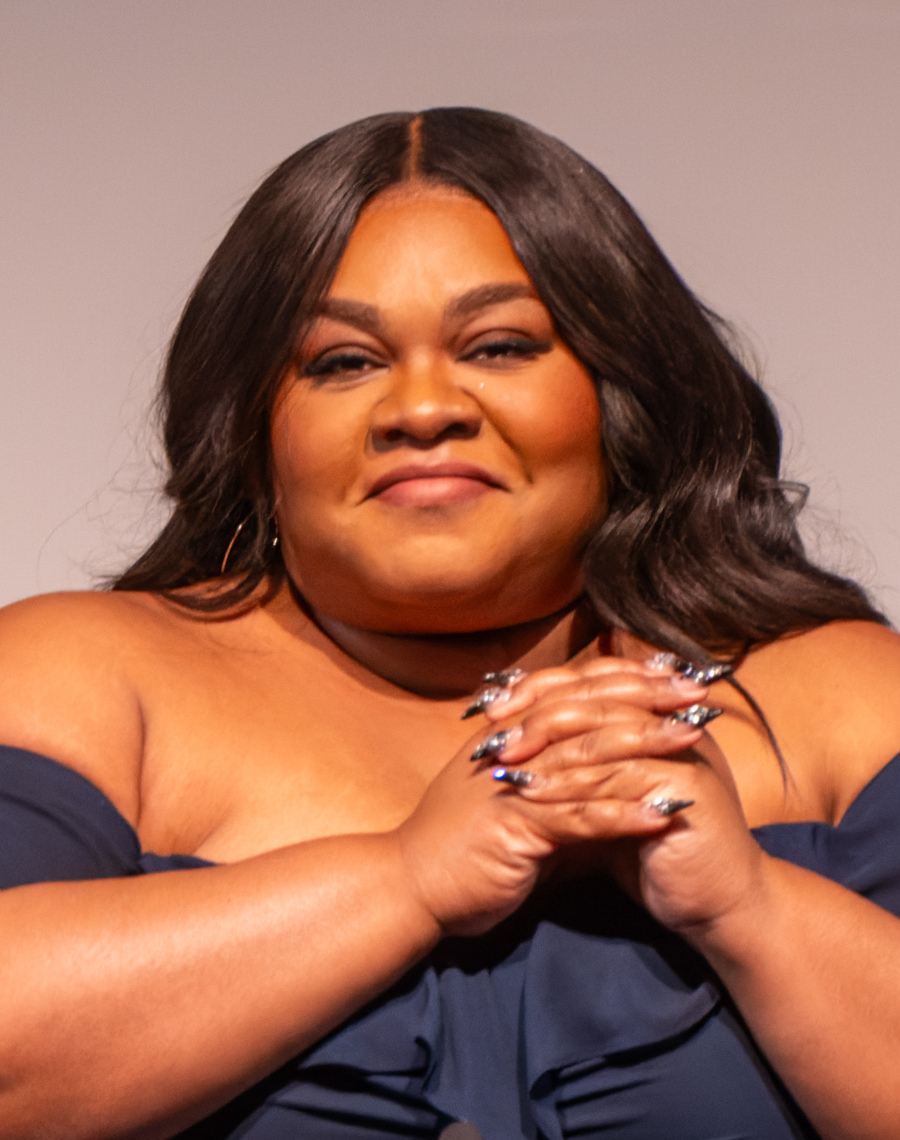
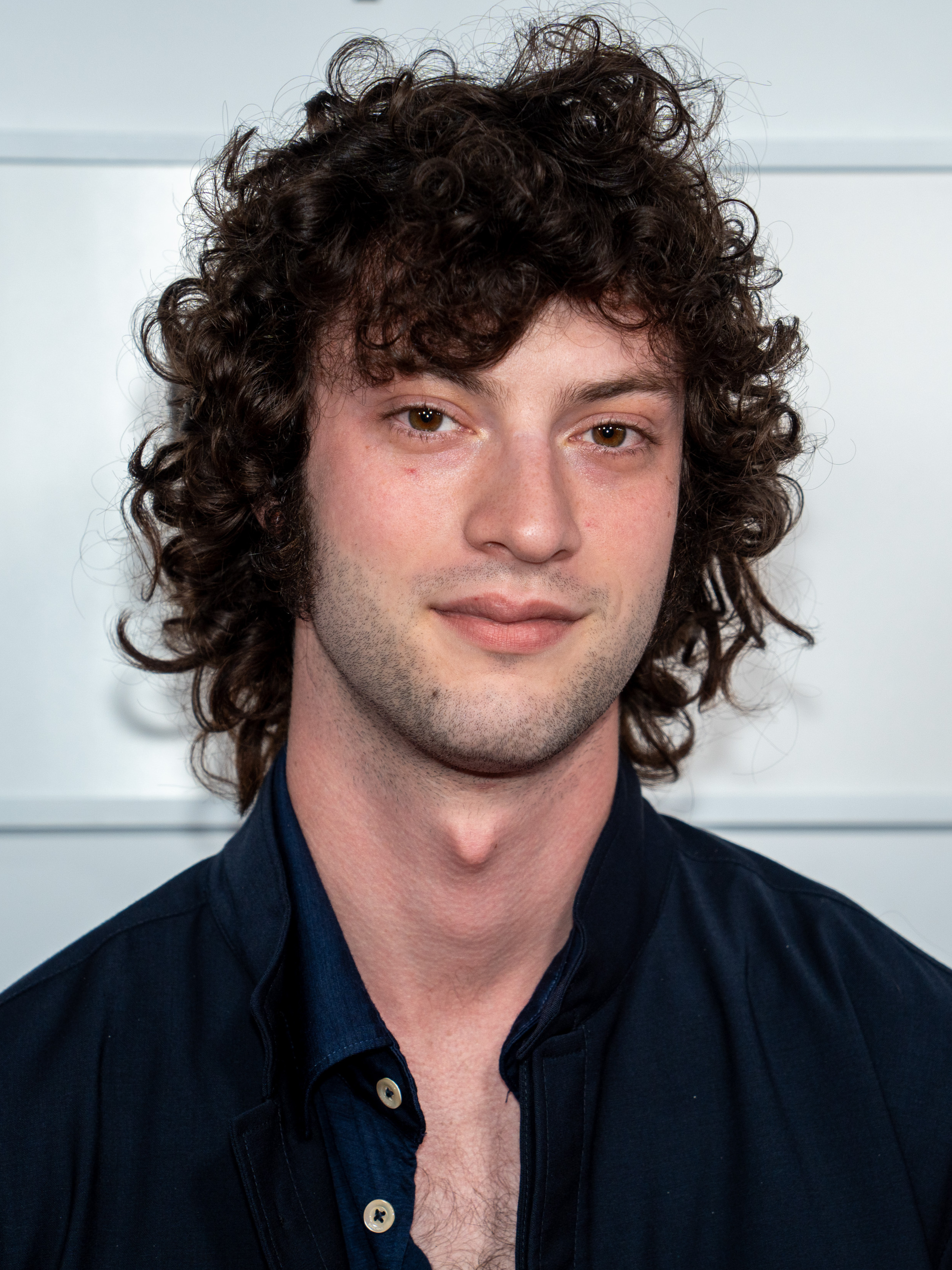
Paul Giamatti, Da'Vine Joy Randolph and Dominic Sessa garnered critical acclaim for their performances and earned Giamatti and Randolph Academy Award nominations for Best Actor and Best Supporting Actress, with Randolph winning.

On the review aggregator website Rotten Tomatoes, 97% of 360 critics' reviews are positive, with an average rating of 8.5/10. The website's consensus reads: "Beautifully bittersweet, The Holdovers marks a satisfying return to form for director Alexander Payne." Metacritic, which uses a weighted average, assigned the film a score of 82 out of 100, based on 61 critics, indicating "universal acclaim". Audiences polled by CinemaScore gave the film an average grade of "A" on an A+ to F scale, while those polled by PostTrak gave it an 80% overall positive score.

Wesley Morris of The New York Times praised Giamatti's performance and Payne's direction, writing: "Even as the story accrues the heft of personal tragedy, each scene seems to float or bob." Patrick Ryan, writing for USA Today, compared it to Frank Capra's It's a Wonderful Life, noting that both films grapple with troubled pasts and shattered dreams at Christmastime. Critics have also compared it to the films of Hal Ashby, such as Harold and Maude and The Last Detail.

Reviews in The Boston Globe and Boston.com both praised the film's 1970s New England setting. Ann Hornaday of The Washington Post wrote that it "doesn't only have the look and feel of that time period, it resuscitates the finest elements of its narrative traditions". Richard Brody, writing for The New Yorker, described The Holdovers as "a pile of clichés", but one realized "with such loving immediacy that it feels as if Payne were discovering them for himself". Brody was more critical of the time period, arguing that the "hermetically sealed, historically reduced drama" ignored the politically fraught setting of the 1970s. Nonetheless, Michael Schulman, another writer for The New Yorker, included Giamatti, Sessa and Randolph in his list of the year's best performances, and considered the last "in a prime position for the Best Supporting Actress race".

Justin Chang of the Los Angeles Times praised the film's "enveloping sense of time and place", but as a whole, criticized it as "a flat, phony, painfully diagrammatic movie masquerading as a compassionate, humane one". Chang also wrote that Mary Lamb, despite Randolph's affecting performance, was "somehow the movie's most under-developed role".

Filmmaker James Gray praised the film, saying: "The film takes place in 1970, the first year of American history's greatest hangover. And the rhythms and look, precisely rendered, lend a bracing authenticity to the proceedings. More important, the movie recalls vividly both that era's glorious dreams and the stinging cost of idealism. These lonely souls may seem doomed, but they're still trying. And though bearing witness may not always be pretty, it is beautiful. So is The Holdovers." Other filmmakers, including Joe Dante, Robert Eggers, Matt Johnson, Raine Allen-Miller and Rachel Morrison, as well as former U.S. President Barack Obama, also cited it as among their favorite films of 2023.

In 2025, the film ranked number 98 on the "Readers' Choice" edition of The New York Times' list of "The 100 Best Movies of the 21st Century."

=== Plagiarism accusation ===
In March 2024, Variety reported that screenwriter Simon Stephenson had lodged a complaint with the Writers Guild of America, accusing the film's screenplay of plagiarizing an unproduced script he wrote titled Frisco, a 2013 Black List entry. Stephenson said that Payne had been sent his script on at least two occasions in the 2010s, and accused Hemingson's final script of being "forensically identical" to his, alleging similarities in "story, characters, structure, scenes [and] dialogue" across the "meaningful entirety" of the film. Frisco producer Tom McNulty questioned Stephenson's claims. Payne dismissed the accusation as baseless, stating he took the idea for the film from Merlusse, and criticising Variety for reporting the claim without assessing its merits.

== Accolades ==
The Holdovers was nominated in five categories at the 96th Academy Awards, including Best Picture and with Randolph winning for her performance. The film was named one of the year's top ten Films by the American Film Institute and the National Board of Review.

For her performance as Mary Lamb, Da'Vine Joy Randolph won the Academy Award for Best Supporting Actress, the Screen Actors Guild Award for Best Supporting Actress, the Critics' Choice Movie Award for Best Supporting Actress, the BAFTA Award for Best Actress in a Supporting Role, the Golden Globe Award for Best Supporting Actress – Motion Picture, and the New York Film Critics Circle Award for Best Supporting Actress. For his performance as Paul Hunham, Paul Giamatti won the Golden Globe Award for Best Actor – Motion Picture Musical or Comedy and the Critics' Choice Movie Award for Best Actor. For his performance as Angus Tully, Dominic Sessa won the Critics' Choice Movie Award for Best Young Performer and was nominated for the BAFTA Award for Best Actor in a Supporting Role.

== See also ==
- 1970s nostalgia
