= List of awards and nominations received by Teyana Taylor =

Teyana Taylor awards and nominations
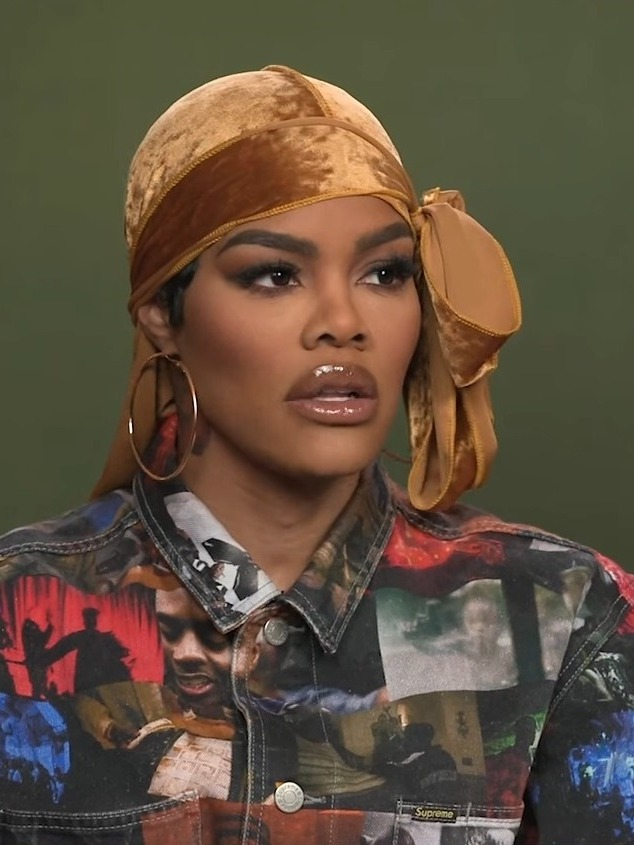
- Taylor in 2023
Awards and nominations
Award	Wins	Nominations
Academy Awards	0	1
Actor Awards	0	2
BAFTA Awards	0	1
Critics' Choice Awards	2	3
Golden Globe Awards	1	1
Grammy Awards	0	1

Totals (Note: Certain award groups do not simply award one winner. They acknowledge several different recipients, have runners-up, and have third place. Since this is a specific recognition and is different from losing an award, runner-up mentions are considered wins in this award tally. For simplification and to avoid errors, each award in this list has been presumed to have had a prior nomination.)
- Wins: 51
- Nominations: 124

The following is a list of award and nominations received by American actress, singer, and music director Teyana Taylor.

== Major associations ==
=== Academy Awards ===
Year	Category	Work	Result	Ref.
2026	Best Supporting Actress	One Battle After Another	Nominated	

=== Actor Awards ===
Year	Category	Work	Result	Ref.
2026	Outstanding Performance by a Cast in a Motion Picture	One Battle After Another	Nominated	
2026	Outstanding Performance by a Female Actor in a Supporting Role	One Battle After Another	Nominated	

=== BAFTA Awards ===
Year	Category	Work	Result	Ref.
British Academy Film Awards
2026	Best Actress in a Supporting Role	One Battle After Another	Nominated	

=== Critics' Choice Awards ===
Year	Category	Work	Result	Ref.
Critics' Choice Movie Awards
2026	Best Supporting Actress	One Battle After Another	Nominated	
Celebration of Cinema and Television
2023	Breakthrough Performance Award	A Thousand and One	Won	
2025	Ensemble Award	One Battle After Another	Won	

=== Golden Globe Awards ===
Year	Category	Work	Result	Ref.
2026	Best Supporting Actress – Motion Picture	One Battle After Another	Won	

=== Grammy Awards ===
Year	Category	Work	Result	Ref.
2026	Best R&B Album	Escape Room	Nominated	

== Miscellaneous awards and honors ==
Organizations	Year	Category	Work	Result	Ref.
Alliance of Women Film Journalists	2025	Best Supporting Actress	One Battle After Another	Nominated	
Alliance of Women Film Journalists	2025	Best Ensemble Cast & Casting Director	One Battle After Another	Nominated	
Alliance of Women Film Journalists	2025	Female Focus: Best Breakthrough Performance	One Battle After Another	Nominated	
Alliance of Women Film Journalists	2025	Female Focus: Best Stunts Performance	One Battle After Another	Nominated	
American Music Awards	2026	Best Female R&B Artist	Herself	Nominated	
Astra Film Awards	2026	Best Supporting Actress – Comedy or Musical	One Battle After Another	Nominated	
Astra Film Awards	2026	Best Ensemble	One Battle After Another	Nominated	
Astra Midseason Movie Awards	2023	Best Actress	A Thousand and One	Nominated	
Atlanta Film Critics Circle	2025	Best Supporting Actress	One Battle After Another	Runner-up	
Atlanta Film Critics Circle	2025	Best Ensemble Cast	One Battle After Another	Won	
Austin Film Critics Association	2025	Best Supporting Actress	One Battle After Another	Nominated	
BET Awards	2019	BET Her Award	"Rose in Harlem"	Nominated	
BET Awards	2019	Best Female R&B/Pop Artist	Herself	Nominated	
BET Awards	2020	Video Director of the Year	Herself	Won	
BET Awards	2023	Video Director of the Year	Herself	Won	
BET Awards	2026	Video Director of the Year	Herself	Won	
BET Awards	2026	Best Actress	Herself	Won	
BET Awards	2026	Fashion Vanguard Award	Herself	Won	
BET Awards	2026	Icon of the Year	Herself	Honored	
BET Hip Hop Awards	2020	Video Director of the Year	Herself	Won	
Billboard Women in Music	2026	Visionary Award	Herself	Honored	
Black Film Critics Circle	2025	Best Supporting Actress	One Battle After Another	Won	
Black Reel Awards	2024	Outstanding Lead Performance	A Thousand and One	Nominated	
Black Reel Awards	2024	Outstanding Breakthrough Performance	A Thousand and One	Nominated	
Black Reel Awards	2026	Outstanding Supporting Performance	One Battle After Another	Nominated	
Capri Hollywood International Film Festival	2025	Best Supporting Actress	One Battle After Another	Won	
Chicago Film Critics Association	2025	Best Supporting Actress	One Battle After Another	Won	
Chicago Indie Critics	2026	Best Supporting Actress	One Battle After Another	Nominated	
Columbus Film Critics Association	2026	Best Supporting Performance	One Battle After Another	Nominated	
Costume Designers Guild Awards	2026	Vanguard Spotlight Award	Herself	Honored	
Dallas–Fort Worth Film Critics Association	2025	Best Supporting Actress	One Battle After Another	Won	
DiscussingFilm Critics Award	2026	Best Supporting Actress	One Battle After Another	Silver	
Dorian Awards	2026	Best Supporting Performance	One Battle After Another	Nominated	
Ebony Power 100	2025	Entertainer of the Year	Herself	Honored	
Florida Film Critics Circle	2023	Best Actress	A Thousand and One	Nominated	
Florida Film Critics Circle	2025	Best Supporting Actress	One Battle After Another	Won	
Georgia Film Critics Association	2025	Best Supporting Actress	One Battle After Another	Nominated	
Give Her FlowHERS Awards	2023	The Visionary Award	Herself	Won	
Gotham Awards	2023	Outstanding Lead Performance	A Thousand and One	Nominated	
Gotham Awards	2025	Outstanding Supporting Performance	One Battle After Another	Nominated	
Greater Western New York Film Critics Association	2026	Best Supporting Actress	One Battle After Another	Nominated	
Greater Western New York Film Critics Association	2026	Best Ensemble	One Battle After Another	Won	
Hawaii Film Critics Society	2026	Best Supporting Actress	One Battle After Another	Nominated	
Houston Film Critics Society	2026	Best Supporting Actress	One Battle After Another	Nominated	
Independent Spirit Awards	2024	Best Lead Performance	A Thousand and One	Nominated	
Indiana Film Journalists Association	2023	Best Lead Performance	A Thousand and One	Nominated	
Indiana Film Journalists Association	2025	Best Supporting Performance	One Battle After Another	Nominated	
Indiana Film Journalists Association	2025	Best Ensemble Acting	One Battle After Another	Runner-up	
International Cinephile Society	2024	Best Actress	A Thousand and One	Runner-up	
International Cinephile Society	2026	Best Supporting Actress	One Battle After Another	Nominated	
Irish Film & Television Awards	2026	Best International Actress	One Battle After Another	Nominated	
Kansas City Film Critics Circle	2025	Best Supporting Actress	One Battle After Another	Nominated	
Las Vegas Film Critics Society	2025	Best Supporting Actress	One Battle After Another	Nominated	
Las Vegas Film Critics Society	2025	Best Ensemble	One Battle After Another	Won	
Latino Entertainment Journalists Association	2026	Best Supporting Actress	One Battle After Another	Won	
London Film Critics' Circle	2026	Supporting Actress of the Year	One Battle After Another	Nominated	
Los Angeles Film Critics Association	2025	Best Supporting Performance	One Battle After Another	Won	
Michigan Movie Critics Guild	2025	Best Supporting Actress	One Battle After Another	Nominated	
Minnesota Film Critics Association	2026	Best Supporting Actress	One Battle After Another	Nominated	
Minnesota Film Critics Association	2026	Best Ensemble	One Battle After Another	Won	
MTV Video Music Awards	2017	Best Choreography	"Fade"	Won	
MTV Video Music Awards	2026	Best Collaboration	"Hard Time" (with Lucky Daye)	Nominated	
Music City Film Critics Association	2026	Best Supporting Actress	One Battle After Another	Nominated	
Music City Film Critics Association	2026	Best Acting Ensemble	One Battle After Another	Nominated	
NAACP Image Awards	2024	Outstanding Actress in a Motion Picture	A Thousand and One	Nominated	
NAACP Image Awards	2024	Outstanding Breakthrough Performance in a Motion Picture	A Thousand and One	Nominated	
NAACP Image Awards	2026	Outstanding Supporting Actress in a Motion Picture	One Battle After Another	Nominated	
NAACP Image Awards	2026	Outstanding Supporting Actress in a Limited Television (Series, Special, or Movie)	Straw	Won	
NAACP Image Awards	2026	Entertainer of the Year	Herself	Nominated	
NAACP Image Awards	2026	Outstanding Female Artist	Herself	Nominated	
NAACP Image Awards	2026	Outstanding Music Video/Visual Album	Escape Room	Nominated	
NAACP Image Awards	2026	Outstanding Soul/R&B Song	"Bed of Roses"	Nominated	
National Board of Review	2023	Best Breakthrough Performance	A Thousand and One	Won	
National Society of Film Critics	2026	Best Supporting Actress	One Battle After Another	Won	
New York Film Critics Online	2025	Best Supporting Actress	One Battle After Another	Nominated	
New York Film Critics Online	2025	Ensemble Cast	One Battle After Another	Runner-up	
New Jersey Film Critics Circle	2025	Best Supporting Actress	One Battle After Another	Nominated	
North Dakota Film Society	2026	Best Supporting Actress	One Battle After Another	Nominated	
North Dakota Film Society	2026	Best Ensemble	One Battle After Another	Nominated	
North Texas Film Critics Association	2025	Best Supporting Actress	One Battle After Another	Nominated	
North Texas Film Critics Association	2025	Gary Murray Award	One Battle After Another	Nominated	
Oklahoma Film Critics Circle	2026	Best Supporting Actress	One Battle After Another	Runner-up	
Oklahoma Film Critics Circle	2026	Best Ensemble	One Battle After Another	Won	
Online Association of Female Film Critics	2023	Best Breakthrough Performance	A Thousand and One	Nominated	
Online Association of Female Film Critics	2025	Best Supporting Actress	One Battle After Another	Nominated	
Online Association of Female Film Critics	2025	Best Ensemble	One Battle After Another	Nominated	
Online Film & Television Association	2026	Best Supporting Actress	One Battle After Another	Runner-up	
Online Film Critics Society	2026	Best Supporting Actress	One Battle After Another	Nominated	
Online Film Critics Society	2026	Best Ensemble & Casting	One Battle After Another	Nominated	
Philadelphia Film Critics Circle	2025	Best Supporting Actress	One Battle After Another	Won	
Philadelphia Film Critics Circle	2025	Best Ensemble	One Battle After Another	Runner-up	
Phoenix Critics Circle	2025	Best Actress in a Supporting Role	One Battle After Another	Nominated	
Phoenix Film Critics Society	2025	Best Supporting Actress	One Battle After Another	Won	
Portland Critics Association	2025	Best Ensemble	One Battle After Another	Won	
Puerto Rico Critics Association	2026	Best Supporting Actress	One Battle After Another	Nominated	
San Diego Film Critics Society	2025	Best Supporting Actress	One Battle After Another	Nominated	
San Francisco Bay Area Film Critics Circle	2025	Best Supporting Actress	One Battle After Another	Nominated	
Santa Barbara International Film Festival	2026	Virtuosos Award	One Battle After Another	Won	
Satellite Awards	2026	Best Actress in a Supporting Role	One Battle After Another	Won	
Seattle Film Critics Society	2025	Best Supporting Actress	One Battle After Another	Nominated	
Seattle Film Critics Society	2025	Best Ensemble Cast	One Battle After Another	Won	
Soul Train Music Awards	2016	Best Dance Performance	"Fade" (with Kanye West)	Won	
Soul Train Music Awards	2019	Best Dance Performance	"WTP"	Nominated	
Soul Train Music Awards	2020	Best Dance Performance	"Bare With Me"	Nominated	
Southeastern Film Critics Association	2025	Best Supporting Actress	One Battle After Another	Runner-up	
Southeastern Film Critics Association	2025	Best Ensemble	One Battle After Another	Runner-up	
St. Louis Film Critics Association	2025	Best Supporting Actress	One Battle After Another	Runner-up	
St. Louis Film Critics Association	2025	Best Ensemble	One Battle After Another	Won	
Toronto Film Critics Association	2023	Best Breakthrough Performance	A Thousand and One	Won	
UK Film Critics Association	2026	Best Supporting Actress	One Battle After Another	Nominated	
Utah Film Critics Association	2026	Best Supporting Performance – Female	One Battle After Another	Nominated	
Utah Film Critics Association	2026	Best Ensemble	One Battle After Another	Nominated	
Vancouver Film Critics Circle	2026	Best Supporting Female Actor	One Battle After Another	Nominated	
Variety Creative Impact Awards	2026	Creative Impact in Breakthrough Performance	One Battle After Another	Honored	
Washington D.C. Area Film Critics Association Awards	2025	Best Supporting Actress	One Battle After Another	Won	
Washington D.C. Area Film Critics Association Awards	2025	Best Ensemble	One Battle After Another	Nominated	
Women Film Critics Circle	2023	Best Actress	A Thousand and One	Nominated	
