= All Dirt Roads Taste of Salt =

2023 film by Raven Jackson

- Theatrical release poster
- Directed by: Raven Jackson
- Written by: Raven Jackson
- Produced by: Maria Altamirano; Barry Jenkins; Adele Romanski; Mark Ceryak
- Starring: Charleen McClure; Moses Ingram; Reginald Helms Jr.; Zainab Jah; Sheila Atim; Chris Chalk
- Cinematography: Jomo Fray
- Edited by: Lee Chatametikool
- Music by: Sasha Gordon; Victor Magro
- Production companies: A24; Pastel; Tender
- Distributed by: A24
- Release dates: January 22, 2023 (Sundance); November 3, 2023
- Running time: 92 minutes
- Country: United States
- Language: English
- Box office: $52,084

All Dirt Roads Taste of Salt is a 2023 American drama film written and directed by Raven Jackson in her feature-film directorial debut. It stars Charleen McClure, Moses Ingram, Reginald Helms Jr., Zainab Jah, Sheila Atim, and Chris Chalk. Barry Jenkins serves as a producer under his Pastel banner. The film has very little spoken dialogue.

It had its world premiere in the U.S. Dramatic competition at the 2023 Sundance Film Festival on January 22, 2023 and was released by A24 on November 3, 2023. It received positive reviews from critics and was named one of the top 10 independent films of 2023 by the National Board of Review.

== Plot ==
The film charts the growth, loves, and heartbreaks of a Black woman in Mississippi, from her childhood through to her adult years.

== Cast ==
- Charleen McClure as Mack
  - Kaylee Nicole Johnson as young Mack
  - Zainab Jah as older Mack
- Moses Ingram as Josie
  - Jayah Henry as young Josie
- Reginald Helms Jr. as Wood
  - Preston McDowell as young Wood
- Sheila Atim as Evelyn
- Chris Chalk as Isaiah

== Production ==
In February 2021, it was announced that Raven Jackson would write and direct the film, with Barry Jenkins set to serve as a producer under his Pastel banner, and A24 set to produce and distribute.

Principal photography took place in Tennessee and in Vicksburg and Jackson, Mississippi in the fall of 2021.

== Release ==
All Dirt Roads Taste of Salt had its world premiere at the 2023 Sundance Film Festival on January 22, 2023. It also screened at the 71st San Sebastián International Film Festival and the 2023 New York Film Festival. The film was released by A24 on November 3, 2023.

== Reception ==
On the review aggregator website Rotten Tomatoes, 89% of 65 critics' reviews are positive, with an average rating of 7.5/10. The website's consensus reads: "For viewers willing and able to adjust to its leisurely, recursive rhythm, All Dirt Roads Taste of Salt is a beautifully elegant exploration of grief and longing." Metacritic, which uses a weighted average, assigned the film a score of 87 out of 100, based on 22 critics, indicating "universal acclaim".

Richard Brody, in The New Yorker, described it as the most distinctive film of 2023 from a strict perspective of inventive narrative form.

=== Accolades ===
Award	Date of ceremony	Category	Recipient(s)	Result	Ref.
Sundance Film Festival	January 27, 2023	Grand Jury Prize: Dramatic Competition	All Dirt Roads Taste of Salt	Nominated	
San Sebastián International Film Festival	September 30, 2023	Golden Shell	All Dirt Roads Taste of Salt	Nominated	
San Sebastián International Film Festival	September 30, 2023	RTVE-Another Look Award: Special Mention	All Dirt Roads Taste of Salt	Won	
San Sebastián International Film Festival	September 30, 2023	SIGNIS Award	All Dirt Roads Taste of Salt	Won	
Ghent International Film Festival	October 21, 2023	Best Film	All Dirt Roads Taste of Salt	Nominated	
Chicago International Film Festival	October 22, 2023	Gold Hugo	All Dirt Roads Taste of Salt	Nominated	
Montclair Film Festival	October 29, 2023	Breakthrough Director & Writer Award	Raven Jackson	Won	
Gotham Independent Film Awards	November 27, 2023	Breakthrough Director	Raven Jackson	Nominated	
National Board of Review	December 6, 2023	Top 10 Independent Films	All Dirt Roads Taste of Salt	Won (Note: This award does not have a single winner, but recognizes multiple films.)	
IndieWire Critics Poll	December 11, 2023	Best Cinematography	Jomo Fray	5th Place	
IndieWire Critics Poll	December 11, 2023	Best First Feature	All Dirt Roads Taste of Salt	2nd Place	
Chicago Film Critics Association Awards	December 12, 2023	Best Editing	All Dirt Roads Taste of Salt	Nominated	
Chicago Film Critics Association Awards	December 12, 2023	Milos Stehlik Award for Breakthrough Filmmaker	Raven Jackson	Nominated	
Florida Film Critics Circle Awards	December 21, 2023	Best First Film	Raven Jackson	Nominated	
Black Reel Awards	January 16, 2024	Outstanding Independent Film	All Dirt Roads Taste of Salt	Nominated	
Black Reel Awards	January 16, 2024	Outstanding Emerging Director	Raven Jackson	Nominated	
Black Reel Awards	January 16, 2024	Outstanding First Screenplay	Raven Jackson	Nominated	
Black Reel Awards	January 16, 2024	Outstanding Cinematography	Jomo Fray	Won	
Independent Spirit Awards	February 25, 2024	Best First Feature	Raven Jackson, Maria Altamirano, Mark Ceryak, Barry Jenkins, and Adele Romanski	Nominated	
Independent Spirit Awards	February 25, 2024	Best Cinematography	Jomo Fray	Nominated	
