= A. V. Rockwell =

American filmmaker

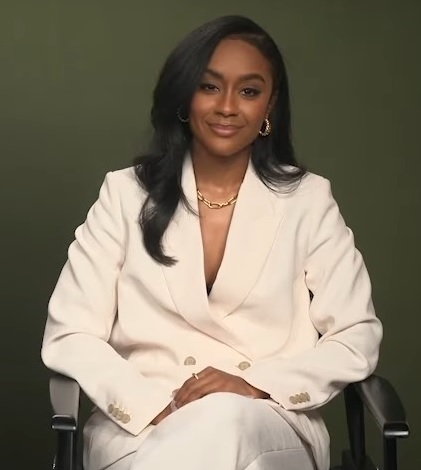
- Born: Queens, New York City, U.S.
- Education: New York University
- Occupation: Filmmaker
- Years active: 2016–present
- Notable work: A Thousand and One
- Awards: Sundance Grand Jury Prize - Dramatic (2023); Guggenheim Fellowship (2017)

A. V. Rockwell (born Alina Victoria Rockwell) is an American film director. In 2023, she made her directorial feature film debut with the film A Thousand and One, which gave her a Gotham Award, a Black Reel Award, an Independent Spirit Award, a Director's Guild nomination, and nominations at the NAACP Image Awards.

== Early life and education ==
Born in 1990, Rockwell was born and raised in Queens, New York, to parents from Jamaica. She attended high school at Brooklyn Technical High School and attended film school at the Tisch School of the Arts at New York University. One of her early inspirations to pursue film came from studying European cinema while studying in Paris.

== Career ==
One of Rockwell's early works was the series Open City Mixtape, which followed young people's stories in New York City, and was shot in black-and-white. Subsequently, Rockwell worked with Alicia Keys on the music-focused music short film The Gospel for Keys' sixth studio album, Here. The work gave her a silver Clio Awards.

In 2018, Rockwell released her short film Feathers, which debuted at the Toronto International Film Festival. For Feathers, Rockwell was named the grand-prize winner of the Tribeca Film Institute and CHANEL’s Through Her Lens grant; the film was selected as part of the 2019 Sundance Film Festival and was then acquired by Fox Searchlight Pictures for their Searchlight Shorts collection.

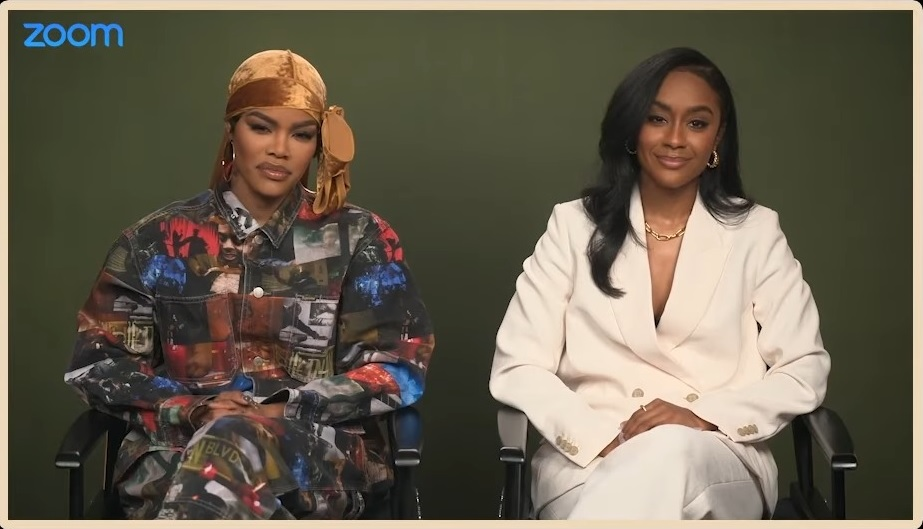
Rockwell (right) and actress Teyana Taylor promote A Thousand and One. The film received universal acclaim.

In 2023, Rockwell made her feature debut with A Thousand and One, starring Teyana Taylor and set in Harlem, New York, between 1994 and 2005. The film debuted at the 2023 Sundance Film Festival, where it won the Grand Jury Prize. She has cited Martin Scorsese and Spike Lee as influences, as well as the films Goodfellas, Crooklyn, Do the Right Thing, Who Framed Roger Rabbit, Z, The Battle of Algiers, and Seven Beauties.

Over her career, Rockwell has been named one of Filmmaker Magazine’s 25 New Faces of Independent Film, was a 2018 Young Guns award winner, and has received fellowships from the Sundance Institute, Tribeca Film Institute and the John S. Guggenheim Foundation. She won the Breakthrough Director Award at the 2023 Gotham Awards for her work in her feature film directorial debut A Thousand and One.

== Filmography ==
| Year | Title | Director | Writer | Producer | Notes |
|---|---|---|---|---|---|
| 2016 | The Gospel | Yes | Yes | No | Short film |
| 2018 | Feathers | Yes | Yes | Yes | Short film |
| 2023 | A Thousand and One | Yes | Yes | Executive | Feature directorial debut |

== Accolades ==
| Association | Year | Work | Category | Result | Ref. |
|---|---|---|---|---|---|
| African-American Film Critics Association | 2024 | A Thousand and One | Best Independent Feature | Won | |
| Astra Film Awards | 2024 | A Thousand and One | Best First Feature | Nominated | |
| Austin Film Critics Association | 2023 | A Thousand and One | Best First Film | Nominated | |
| Black Film Critics Circle | 2023 | Herself | Rising Star Award | Won | |
| Black Reel Awards | 2024 | A Thousand and One | Outstanding Independent Film | Won | |
| Black Reel Awards | 2024 | A Thousand and One | Outstanding Director | Nominated | |
| Black Reel Awards | 2024 | A Thousand and One | Outstanding Emerging Director | Nominated | |
| Black Reel Awards | 2024 | A Thousand and One | Outstanding Screenplay | Nominated | |
| Black Reel Awards | 2024 | A Thousand and One | Outstanding First Screenplay | Nominated | |
| Chicago Film Critics Association | 2023 | A Thousand and One | Breakthrough Filmmaker | Nominated | |
| Clio Awards | 2017 | Alicia Keys: The Gospel | Music - Film Long Form: Music Marketing | silver | |
| Directors Guild of America Awards | 2024 | A Thousand and One | Outstanding Directing – First-Time Feature Film | Nominated | |
| Florida Film Critics Circle | 2023 | A Thousand and One | Best First Film | Runner-up | |
| Gotham Independent Film Awards | 2023 | A Thousand and One | Best Feature | Nominated | |
| Gotham Independent Film Awards | 2023 | A Thousand and One | Breakthrough Director | Won | |
| Hamptons International Film Festival | 2018 | Feathers | Best Narrative Short | Nominated | |
| Independent Spirit Awards | 2024 | A Thousand and One | Best First Feature | Won | |
| NAACP Image Awards | 2024 | A Thousand and One | Outstanding Breakthrough Creative (Motion Picture) | Nominated | |
| NAACP Image Awards | 2024 | A Thousand and One | Outstanding Writing in a Motion Picture | Nominated | |
| Online Film Critics Society | 2024 | A Thousand and One | Best Debut Feature | Nominated | |
| San Diego Film Critics Society Awards | 2023 | A Thousand and One | Best First Feature (Director) | Nominated | |
| Sundance Film Festival | 2019 | Feathers | Short Film Grand Jury Prize | Nominated | |
| Sundance Film Festival | 2023 | A Thousand and One | Grand Jury Prize — U.S. Dramatic | Won | |
| Toronto International Film Festival | 2019 | Feathers | Short Cuts Award | Nominated | |
| Tribeca Festival | 2016 | Alicia Keys: The Gospel | Best Narrative Short | Nominated | |
