= Raven Jackson =

American filmmaker and television writer (born 1990)

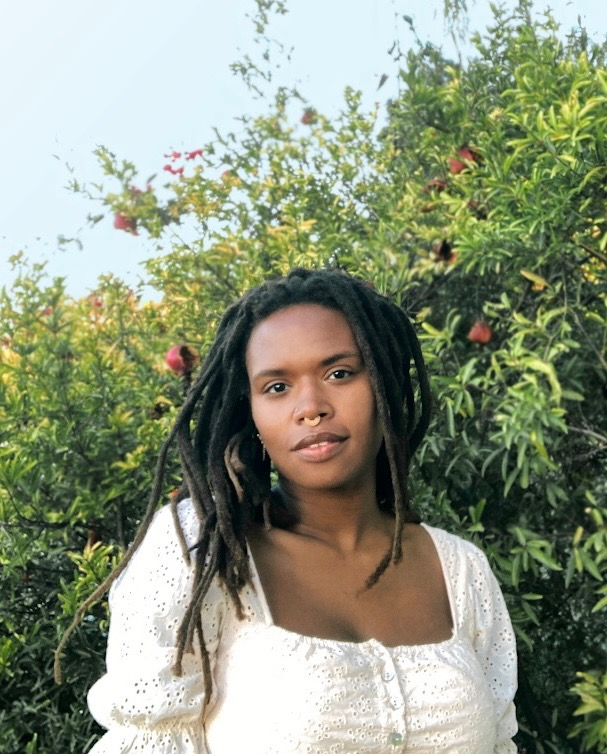
- Raven Jackson 2026
- Born: 1990 (age 35–36); Tennessee, U.S.
- Education: Austin Peay State University; New York University Tisch School of the Arts
- Occupation: Filmmaker
- Notable work: All Dirt Roads Taste of Salt (2023)
- Awards: United States Artists Fellowship (2026), Guggenheim Fellowship (2025)

Raven Jackson (born 1990) is an American filmmaker and television writer. A graduate of the New York University Tisch School of the Arts, she released several short films before making her feature film debut with All Dirt Roads Taste of Salt (2023). She is a 2025 Guggenheim Fellow.

== Biography ==
Raven Jackson was born in 1990 in Tennessee, to a mother from Mississippi. She is a native of Clarksville, Tennessee, and "grew up fishing on the Cumberland River". She graduated from Austin Peay State University in 2012, and she obtained her first MFA at The New School's writing program. Despite being uncertain about filmmaking without a background of technical experience, she decided to apply to New York University, and she obtained another MFA from New York University Tisch School of the Arts's graduate film program.

Her NYU thesis film was called Nettles, and it appeared at the 2019 Slamdance Film Festival. She later released another short film, A Guide To Breathing Underwater (2018). She and Leigh Ann Biety co-wrote "The Myth of California", a 2022 episode of the Apple TV+ series Surface.

Her feature film debut All Dirt Roads Taste of Salt, which she directed and wrote, was released in 2023. She then received several personal nominations, including the 2023 Gotham Independent Film Award for Breakthrough Director, the 2023 Chicago Film Critics Association Milos Stehlik Award for Breakthrough Filmmaker, and the 2024 Black Reel Award for Outstanding Emerging Director and for Outstanding Breakthrough Screenwriter. In 2024, she directed the music video for Common's song "Dreamin'". In 2025, she was awarded a Film Independent Amplifier Fellowship and a Guggenheim Fellowship, and in 2026, she was named a United States Artists (USA) Fellow. She is also a poet, with one of her poems having the same name as her feature film debut.

== Accolades ==
Award	Date of ceremony	Category	Recipient(s)	Result	Ref.
Sundance Film Festival	January 27, 2023	Grand Jury Prize: Dramatic Competition	All Dirt Roads Taste of Salt	Nominated	
San Sebastián International Film Festival	September 30, 2023	Golden Shell	All Dirt Roads Taste of Salt	Nominated	
San Sebastián International Film Festival	September 30, 2023	RTVE-Another Look Award: Special Mention	All Dirt Roads Taste of Salt	Won	
San Sebastián International Film Festival	September 30, 2023	SIGNIS Award	All Dirt Roads Taste of Salt	Won	
Ghent International Film Festival	October 21, 2023	Best Film	All Dirt Roads Taste of Salt	Nominated	
Chicago International Film Festival	October 22, 2023	Gold Hugo	All Dirt Roads Taste of Salt	Nominated	
Montclair Film Festival	October 29, 2023	Breakthrough Director & Writer Award	Raven Jackson	Won	
Gotham Independent Film Awards	November 27, 2023	Breakthrough Director	Raven Jackson	Nominated	
National Board of Review	December 6, 2023	Top 10 Independent Films	All Dirt Roads Taste of Salt	Won (Note: This award does not have a single winner, but recognizes multiple films.)	
IndieWire Critics Poll	December 11, 2023	Best First Feature	All Dirt Roads Taste of Salt	2nd Place	
Chicago Film Critics Association Awards	December 12, 2023	Best Editing	All Dirt Roads Taste of Salt	Nominated	
Chicago Film Critics Association Awards	December 12, 2023	Milos Stehlik Award for Breakthrough Filmmaker	Raven Jackson	Nominated	
Florida Film Critics Circle Awards	December 21, 2023	Best First Film	Raven Jackson	Nominated	
Black Reel Awards	January 16, 2024	Outstanding Independent Film	All Dirt Roads Taste of Salt	Nominated	
Black Reel Awards	January 16, 2024	Outstanding Emerging Director	Raven Jackson	Nominated	
Black Reel Awards	January 16, 2024	Outstanding First Screenplay	Raven Jackson	Nominated	
Independent Spirit Awards	February 25, 2024	Best First Feature	Raven Jackson, Maria Altamirano, Mark Ceryak, Barry Jenkins, and Adele Romanski	Nominated	
