= Passages (2023 film) =

French film by Ira Sachs

- Theatrical release poster
- Directed by: Ira Sachs
- Written by: Mauricio Zacharias; Ira Sachs; Arlette Langmann (Note: Additional dialogue)
- Produced by: Saïd Ben Saïd; Michel Merkt
- Starring: Franz Rogowski; Ben Whishaw; Erwan Kepoa Falé; Adèle Exarchopoulos
- Cinematography: Josée Deshaies
- Edited by: Sophie Reine
- Production company: SBS Productions
- Distributed by: SBS Distribution
- Release dates: 23 January 2023 (Sundance); 28 June 2023 (France)
- Running time: 92 minutes
- Country: France
- Languages: English; French
- Box office: $1.1 million

Passages is a 2023 French romantic drama film co-written and directed by Ira Sachs and starring Franz Rogowski, Ben Whishaw, and Adèle Exarchopoulos. It depicts a same-sex male couple whose marriage encounters a crisis when one of the men begins an affair with a young woman.

The film had its world premiere at the 2023 Sundance Film Festival, and was released theatrically in France on 28 June 2023 by SBS Distribution.

== Plot ==
Tomas, a German filmmaker based in Paris, has completed his latest film. At the wrap party, he meets Agathe, a young primary school teacher, and dances with her after his husband, Martin, an English printer, declines to dance with him. Tomas goes to Agathe's home for an after-party, and the two have sex.

Upon arriving home the following day, Tomas, who slept over at Agathe's, admits to Martin that he had sex with a woman and felt something he had not felt in a long time. Tomas argues that their marriage is deteriorating and enraged by Martin's refusal to discuss it, starts packing a suitcase to leave but is stopped by Martin. Before leaving, Martin kisses Tomas and assures him they will overcome this. Later, Agathe visits Tomas at the editing room of his film. They have sex again.

Tomas and Martin travel to their country house and ultimately discuss their lives together. Tomas expresses dissatisfaction with their too-comfortable and riskless relationship, while Martin accuses him of falling in love with Agathe.

Back in Paris, Martin meets Amad, a writer and novelist, through a mutual friend at a restaurant. When Tomas arrives, he is somewhat hostile towards Amad and later tells Martin he finds Amad "an arrogant prick". As they leave, Tomas claims to be heading to the editing room but goes to Agathe's instead and spends the night there. In the morning, after Agathe sings Tomas a lullaby from her childhood, he confesses he has fallen in love with her.

Tomas and Martin officially separate, and Tomas moves out of their apartment into Agathe's. While packing, he stumbles upon Amad's book, which Martin is reading. On his way out, Martin informs Tomas he will put the country house up for sale, as he does not wish to own anything with Tomas anymore.

Martin begins a relationship with Amad, whom Tomas runs into when he uses his key to enter Martin's apartment unannounced; Tomas storms out. After Tomas turns up at Martin's workplace to share that his film had a negative first screening, Martin asks him for the apartment keys back.

While at a restaurant with Agathe and friends, Tomas sees Martin arrive with friends, but the two men avoid speaking to each other. Tomas later comes by the apartment to return the keys, inviting himself to spend the night and come with Martin to the country house early the next morning for repairs, claiming it is his property as well. At bedtime, Tomas enters Martin's room and they have sex. In the morning, Tomas reveals to Martin that Agathe is pregnant.

Tomas arrives late to dinner with Agathe's parents at her house. They interrogate him about his plans to support Agathe and their child, as well as his past with Martin, to which he is hostile and defensive.

Tomas returns to Martin's apartment, telling him that audiences loved the recent screening of his film. He kisses Martin and invites himself inside. Tomas proposes that he and Martin raise the baby as a family, confessing he is confused about his feelings for Agathe and misses being with a man. Martin immediately breaks up with Amad, who says neither Tomas nor Martin will survive the relationship.

Some time later, Agathe, Tomas, Martin, and friends gather at the country house. Agathe listens to the two men have sex from the other bedroom. Tomas later climbs into Agathe's bed and embraces her while she is crying.

Agathe severs all contact with Tomas. She meets Martin for lunch, where she reveals to him that she has undergone an abortion, stating that although she wants a family, she realised she would disappear among the three of them. Martin holds back tears, and they say goodbye.

Upon returning home, Martin breaks up with Tomas, refusing to accompany him to Venice and telling him to never contact him again. Tomas stops by Agathe's classroom, begging her to forgive him and inviting her to join him on his trip, but she rejects him as well. He then rides his bicycle aimlessly through the city.

== Cast ==
- Franz Rogowski as Tomas Freiburg
- Ben Whishaw as Martin
- Adèle Exarchopoulos as Agathe
- Erwan Kepoa Falé as Amad
- William Nadylam as Clément
- Caroline Chaniolleau as Agathe's mother
- Olivier Rabourdin as Agathe's father

== Production ==
Filming began on 15 November 2021 in Paris. The costume designer was Khadija Zeggaï.

== Release ==
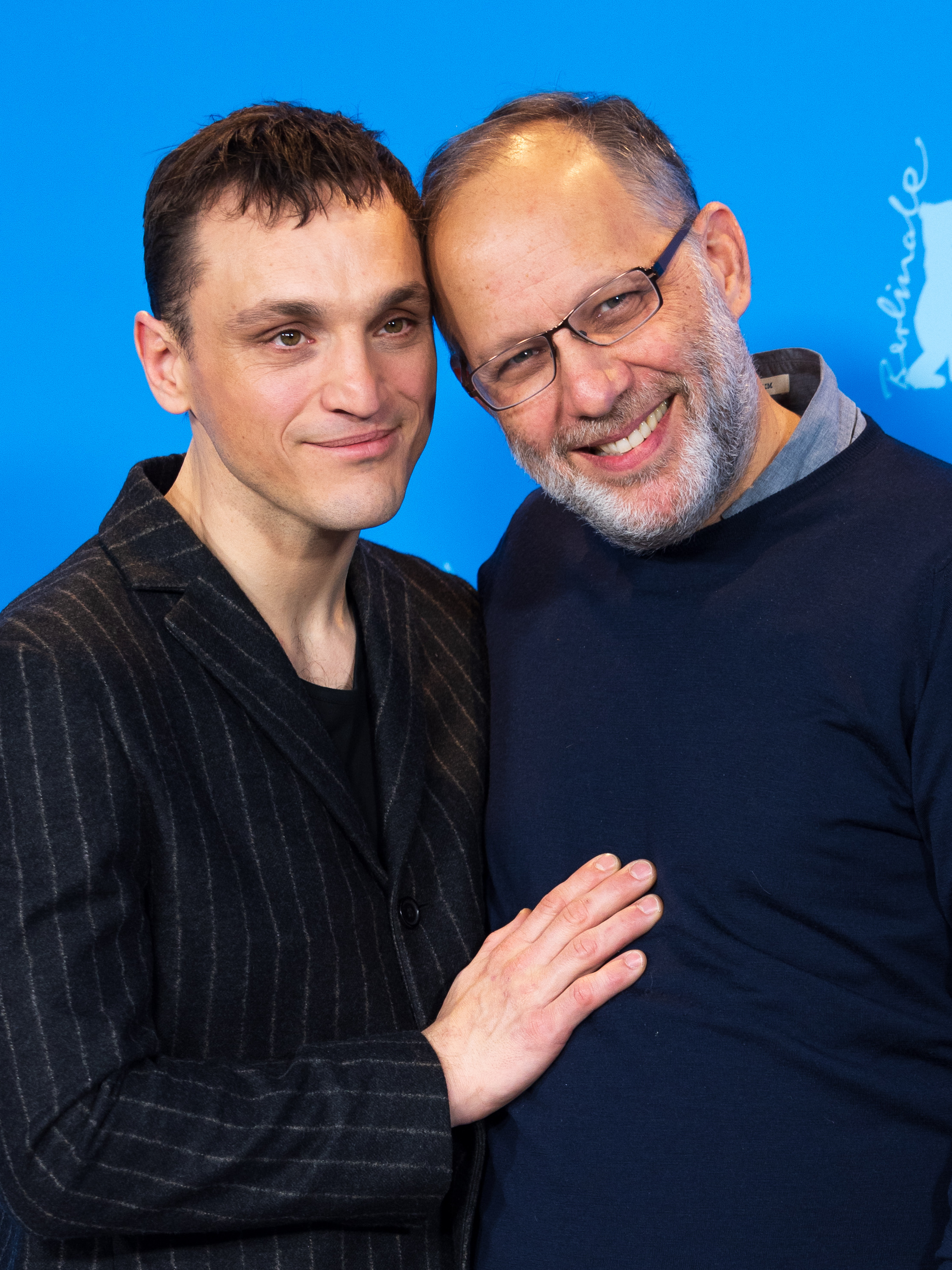
Franz Rogowski and Ira Sachs promoting Passages at the 2023 Berlinale

Passages premiered at the Sundance Film Festival on 23 January 2023. Shortly thereafter, Mubi acquired distribution rights in the United States, United Kingdom, Ireland and Latin America; the streamer would subsequently acquire rights in Germany, Austria, Italy, Turkey and the Benelux as well. It screened in the Panorama section of the 73rd Berlin International Film Festival in February 2023. It was also invited to the 27th Lima Film Festival in the Acclaimed section, where it screened on 10 August 2023.

The film was released theatrically in France on 28 June 2023 by SBS Distribution, and was released in select theatres in the United States on 4 August 2023.

=== U.S. rating ===
Ahead of its U.S. release, the film received an NC-17 rating from the Motion Picture Association. Sachs called the rating "a form of cultural censorship that is quite dangerous, particularly in a culture which is already battling, in such extreme ways, the possibility of LGBT imagery to exist". Mubi issued a statement calling the decision "unexpected" and "deeply disappoint[ing]" and said it would release the film in the United States without a rating.

== Reception ==
On the review aggregator website Rotten Tomatoes, the film holds an approval rating of 94% based on 169 reviews, with an average rating of 8/10. The website's critics consensus reads, "Elevated by a remarkable Franz Rogowski performance, Passages adds another smart, deeply humanistic film to director/co-writer Ira Sachs' estimable filmography." Metacritic, which uses a weighted average, assigned the film a score of 80 out of 100, based on 41 critic reviews, indicating "generally favorable reviews".

The character of Tomas drew comparisons to the life of the German director Rainer Werner Fassbinder.

Filmmakers Chloe Domont, Andrew Haigh, Zoe Lister-Jones, Rachel Morrison and James Ponsoldt all cited Passages among their favorite films of 2023.

In June 2025, IndieWire ranked the film at number 57 on its list of "The 100 Best Movies of the 2020s (So Far)."

=== Accolades ===
Award	Date	Category	Recipient	Result	Ref.
Berlin International Film Festival	25 February 2023	Panorama Section – Best Film	Ira Sachs	Nominated	
Berlin International Film Festival	25 February 2023	Teddy Award for Best Feature Film	Ira Sachs	Nominated	
Guadalajara International Film Festival	9 June 2023	Maguey Award	Passages	Nominated	
Gotham Independent Film Awards	27 November 2023	Best Feature	Passages	Nominated	
Gotham Independent Film Awards	27 November 2023	Outstanding Lead Performance	Franz Rogowski	Nominated	
New York Film Critics Circle Awards	30 November 2023	Best Actor	Franz Rogowski	Won	
IndieWire Critics Poll	11 December 2023	Best Performance	Franz Rogowski	10th Place (Note: Tied with Glenn Howerton for BlackBerry, Benoit Magimel for Pacifiction and Koji Yakusho for Perfect Days.)	
Florida Film Critics Circle Awards	21 December 2023	Best Actor	Franz Rogowski	Won	
Satellite Awards	17 February 2024	Best Actor in a Motion Picture – Drama	Franz Rogowski	Nominated	
Independent Spirit Awards	25 February 2024	Best Film	Michel Merkt, Saïd Ben Saïd	Nominated	
Independent Spirit Awards	25 February 2024	Best Director	Ira Sachs	Nominated	
Independent Spirit Awards	25 February 2024	Best Lead Performance	Franz Rogowski	Nominated	
Independent Spirit Awards	25 February 2024	Best Supporting Performance	Ben Whishaw	Nominated	
GLAAD Media Awards	14 March 2024	Outstanding Film – Limited Release	Passages	Nominated	
