= Black Reel Award for Outstanding Independent Film =

Motion picture award for independent feature

Black Reel Award for Outstanding Independent Feature
- Country: United States
- Presented by: The Black Reel Awards (BRAs)
- First award: 2002
- Most recent winner: A Thousand and One (2024)
- Website: blackreelawards.com

This article lists the winners and nominees for the Black Reel Award for Outstanding Independent Film. This award is presented to the directors of the film.

== Winners and nominees ==
Winners are listed first and highlighted in bold.

=== 2000s ===
Year	Film	Director(s)	Ref
2002
2002	**The Visit**	**Jordan Walker-Pearlman**	
2002	30 Years to Life	Vanessa Middleton	
2002	Blue Hill Avenue	Craig Ross Jr.	
2002	Lift	DeMane Davis and Khari Streeter	
2002	Lumumba	Raoul Peck	
2002	One Week	Carl Seaton	
2003
2003	**Standing in the Shadows of Motown**	**Paul Justman**	
2003	Biggie & Tupac	Nick Broomfield	
2003	Crazy as Hell	Eriq La Salle	
2004
2004	**Anne B. Real**	**Lisa France**	
2004	All About You	Christine Swanson	
2004	G	Shonie De La Rosa and Larry Blackhorse Lowe	
2005
2005	**The Woodsman**	**Nicole Kassell**	
2005	Motives	Craig Ross Jr.	
2005	Woman Thou Art Loosed	Michael Schultz	
2006
2006	**Constellation**	**Jordan Walker-Pearlman**	
2006	Love Trap	Frank B. Goodin II	
2006	On the One	Charles Randolph-Wright	
2006	On the Verge of a Fever	John L'Ecuyer	
2006	Proud	Mary Pat Kelly	
2007
2007	**Traci Townsend**	**Craig Ross Jr.**	
2007	No. 2	Toa Fraser	
2007	Premium	Pete Chatmon	
2008	—N/a		

=== 2010s ===
Year	Film	Director(s)	Ref
2010
2010	**Mississippi Damned**	**Tina Mabry**	
2010	Sugar	Anna Boden and Ryan Fleck	
2010	This is the Life	Ava DuVernay	
2011
2011	**Preacher's Kid**	**Stan Foster**	
2011	Black Venus	Abdellatif Kechiche	
2011	Finding God in the City of Angels	Jennifer Jessum	
2011	Kings of the Evening	Andrew P. Jones	
2011	Toe to Toe	Emily Abt	
2012
2012	**My Last Day Without You**	**Stefan Schaefer**	
2012	Besouro	João Daniel Tikhomiroff	
2012	Billy	Peter Burger	
2012	Mamitas	Nicholas Ozeki	
2012	The Tested	Russell Costanzo	
2013
2013	**LUV**	**Sheldon Candis**	
2013	Elza	Mariette Monpierre	
2013	Four	Joshua Sanchez	
2013	The Last Fall	Matthew A. Cherry	
2013	Yelling to the Sky	Victoria Mahoney	
2014
2014	**Blue Caprice**	**Alexandre Moors**	
2014	Mother of George	Andrew Dosunmu	
2014	Things Never Said	Charles Murray	
2014	An Oversimplification of Her Beauty	Terence Nance	
2014	Go for Sisters	John Sayles	
2015
2015	**The Retrieval**	**Chris Eska**	
2015	1982	Tommy Oliver	
2015	Christmas Wedding Baby	Kiara C. Jones	
2015	CRU	Alton Glass	
2015	Una Vida: A Fable of Music and the Mind	Richie Adams	
2016
2016	**Tangerine**	**Sean S. Baker**	
2016	Blackbird	Patrik-Ian Polk	
2016	Knucklehead	Ben Bowman	
2016	The Man in 3B	Trey Haley	
2016	Somewhere in the Middle	Lanre Olabisi	
2017
2017	**American Honey**	**Andrea Arnold**	
2017	How to Tell You’re a Douchebag	Tahir Jetter	
2017	Hunter Gatherer	Joshua Locy	
2017	The Land	Steven Caple Jr.	
2017	Morris from America	Chad Hartigan	
2018
2018	**Crown Heights**	**Matt Ruskin**	
2018	Burning Sands	Gerard McMurray	
2018	Gook	Justin Chon	
2018	Imperial Dreams	Malik Vitthal	
2018	The Incredible Jessica James	James C. Strouse	
2019
2019	**Jinn**	**Nijla Mumin**	
2019	A Boy. A Girl. A Dream.	Qasim Basir	
2019	Roxanne Roxanne	Michael Larnell	
2019	Monsters and Men	Reinaldo Marcus Green	
2019	Yardie	Idris Elba	

=== 2020s ===
Year	Film	Director(s)	Ref
2020
2020	**The Last Black Man in San Francisco**	**Joe Talbot**	
2020	Burning Cane	Phillip Youmans	
2020	Clemency	Chinonye Chukwu	
2020	Guava Island	Hiro Murai	
2020	Luce	Julius Onah	
2021
2021	**The Forty-Year-Old Version**	**Radha Blank**	
2021	American Skin	Nate Parker	
2021	Farewell Amor	Ekwa Msangi	
2021	Miss Juneteenth	Channing Godfrey Peoples	
2021	Sylvie's Love	Eugene Ashe	
2022
2022	**Zola**	**Janicza Bravo**	
2022	Concrete Cowboy	Ricky Staub	
2022	Nine Days	Edson Oda	
2022	Test Pattern	Shatara Michelle Ford	
2022	The Water Man	David Oyelowo	
2023
2023	**The Inspection**	**Elegance Bratton**	
2023	Emergency	Carey Williams	
2023	Honk for Jesus. Save Your Soul.	Adamma Ebo	
2023	Master	Mariama Diallo	
2023	Nanny	Nikyatu Jusu	
2024
2024	**A Thousand and One**	**A. V. Rockwell**	
2024	All Dirt Roads Taste of Salt	Raven Jackson	
2024	Earth Mama	Savanah Leaf	
2024	How I Learned to Fly	Simon Steuri	
2024	Rye Lane	Raine Allen-Miller	
2025
2025	**We Grown Now**	**Minhal Baig**	
2025	Albany Road	Christine Swanson	
2025	Blink Twice	Zoë Kravitz	
2025	Hard Truths	Mike Leigh	
2025	I Saw the TV Glow	Jane Schoenbrun	

== Multiple wins ==
2 wins

- Jordan Walker-Pearlman

== Multiple nominations ==
3 nominations

- Craig Ross Jr.

2 nominations

- Christine Swanson
- Jordan Walker-Pearlman
