= Chicago Film Critics Association Awards 2023 =

Film awards

36th Chicago Film Critics Association Awards
- Date: December 12, 2023
- Site: Chicago, Illinois, U.S.

Highlights
- Best Picture: Killers of the Flower Moon
- Most awards: Killers of the Flower Moon / May December / Oppenheimer (3)
- Most nominations: Killers of the Flower Moon / Oppenheimer / Poor Things (10)

The 36th Chicago Film Critics Association Awards, presented to recognize the best in film of 2023, were announced on December 12, 2023.

The nominations were announced on December 8, 2023. For the first time in the awards' history, three films shared the position of most nominated—Killers of the Flower Moon, Oppenheimer, and Poor Things—all receiving ten nominations each. In terms of nominations, they were followed by Barbie with nine and May December with seven.

== Winners and nominees ==
The winners and nominees for the 36th Chicago Film Critics Association Awards are as follows:

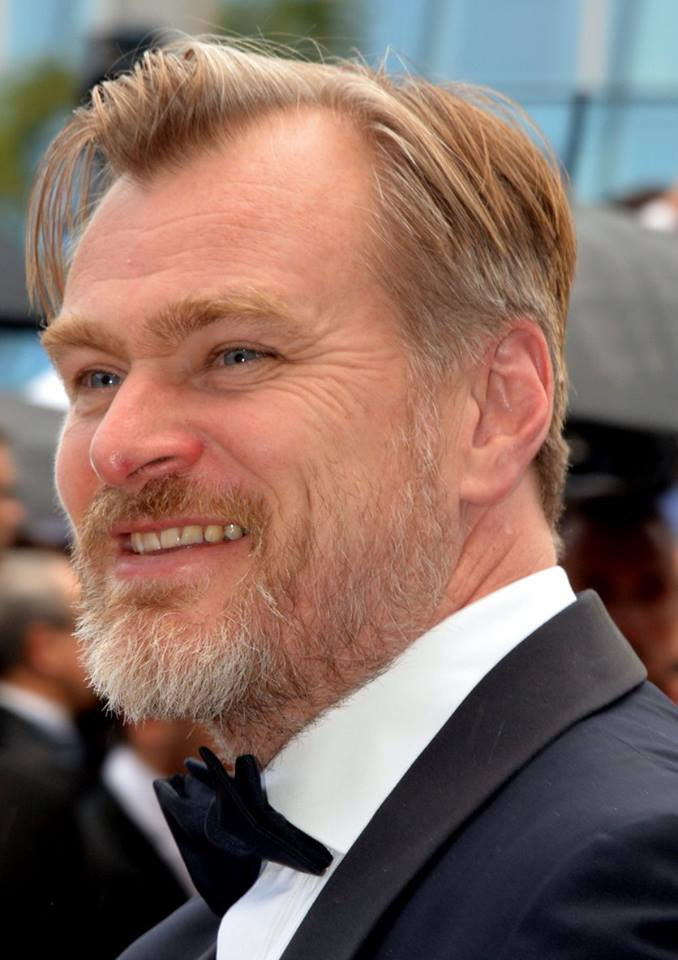
Christopher Nolan, Best Director winner

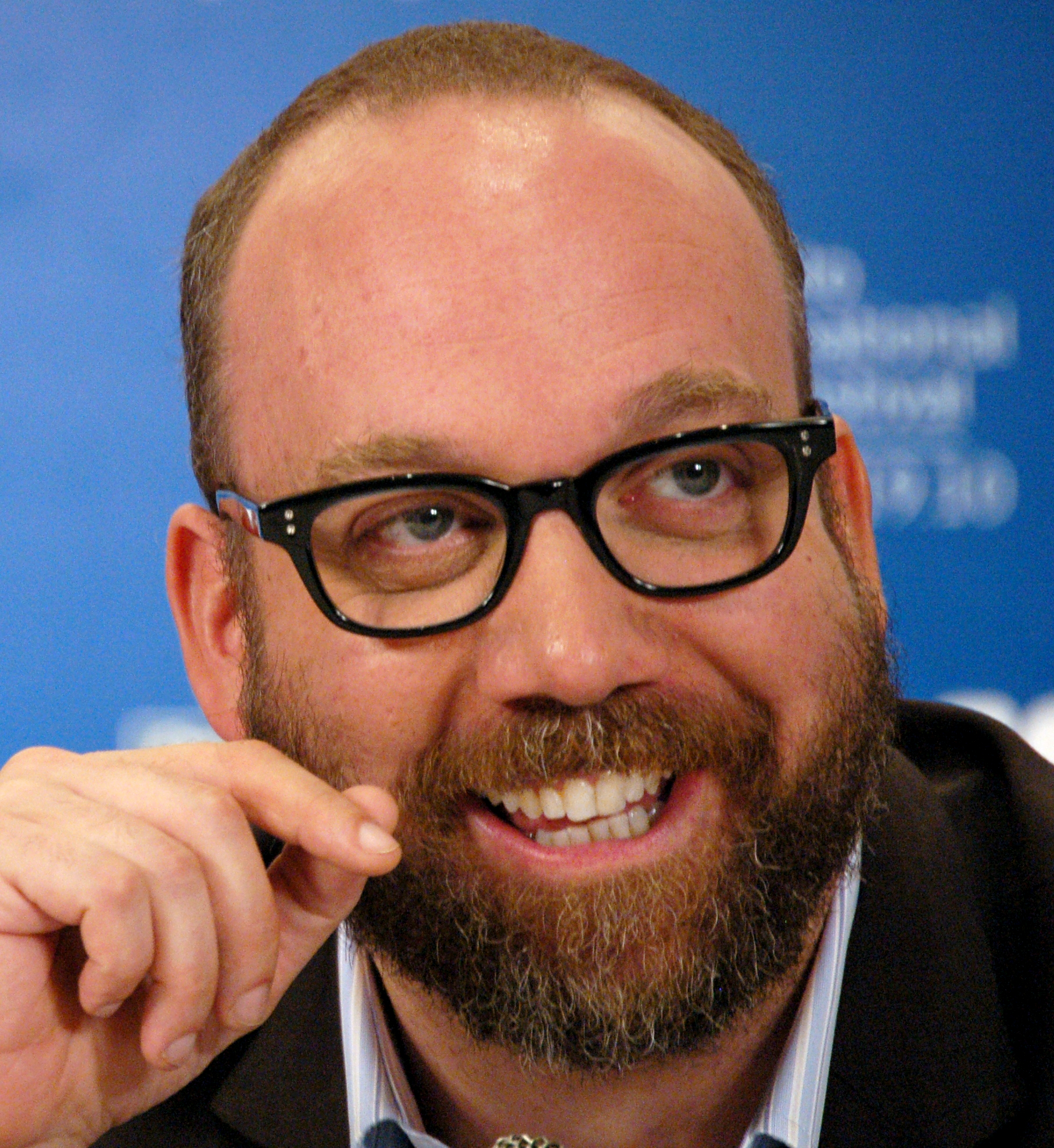
Paul Giamatti, Best Actor winner

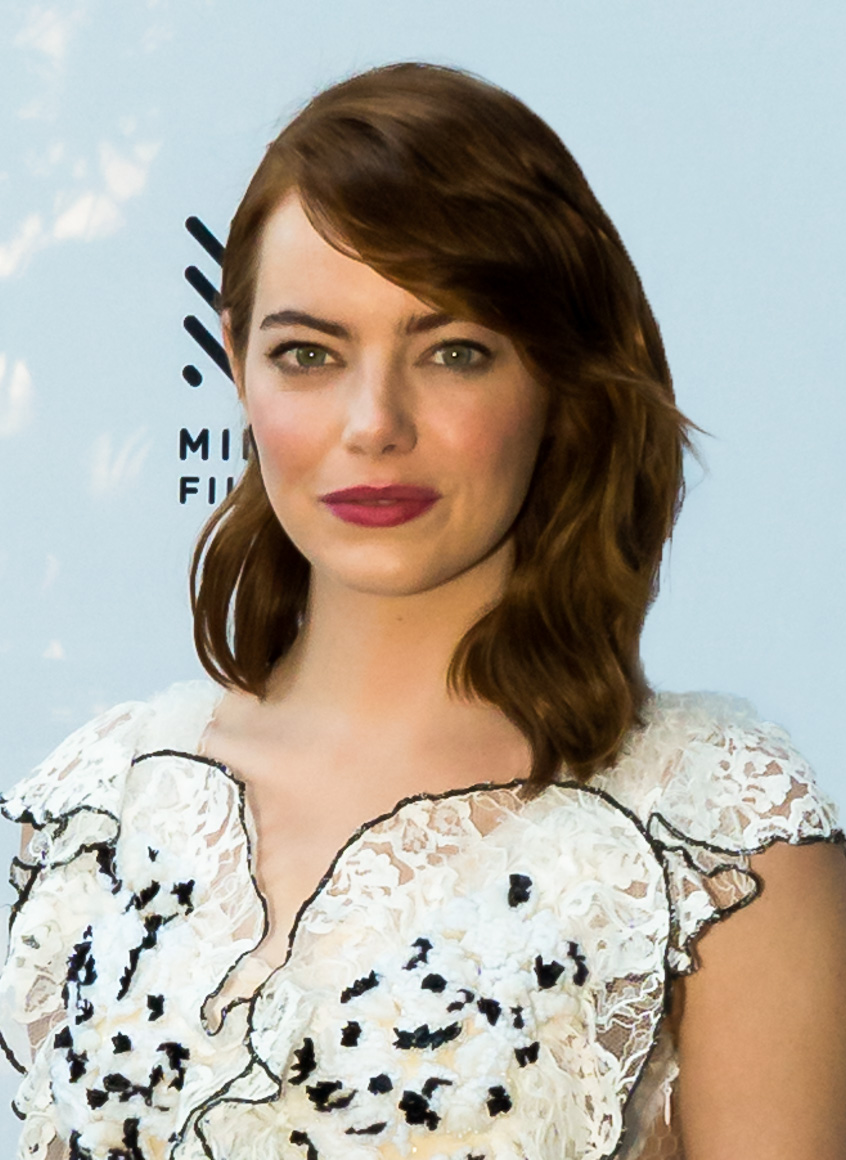
Emma Stone, Best Actress winner

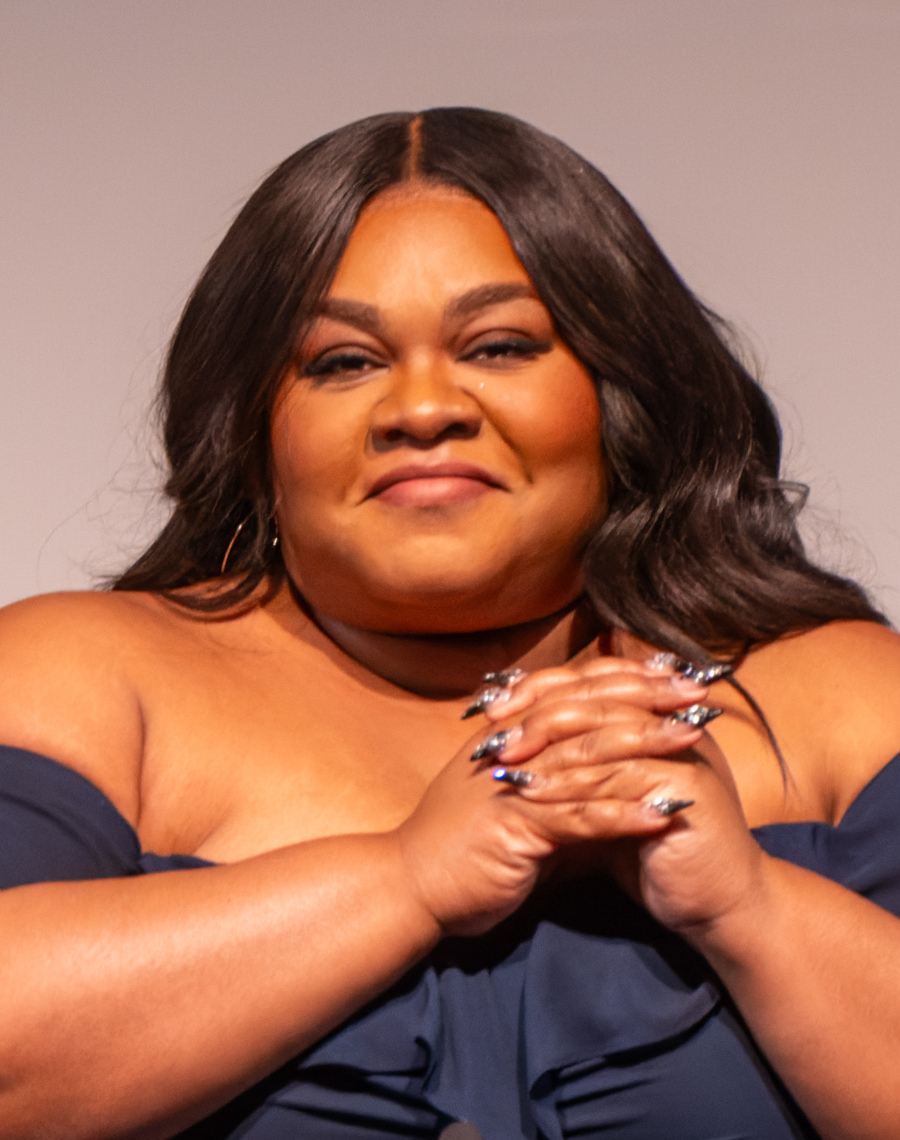
Da'Vine Joy Randolph, Best Supporting Actress winner

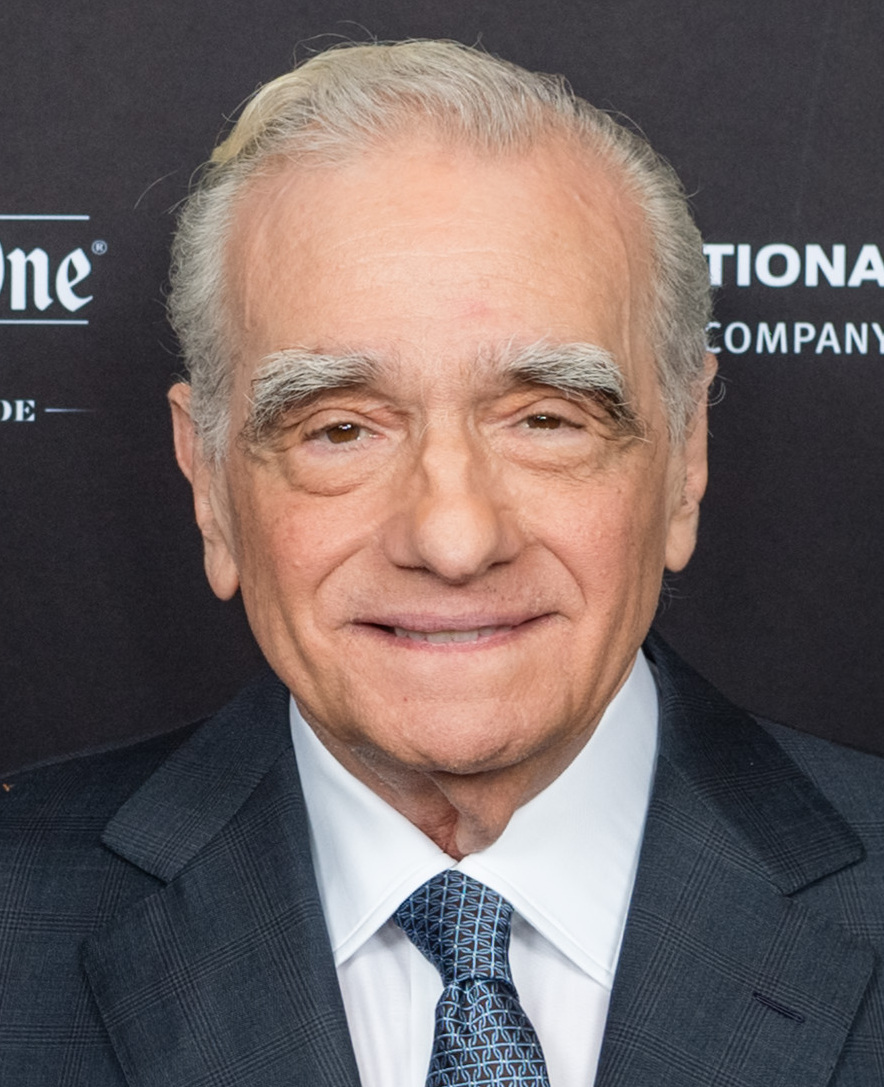
Martin Scorsese, Best Adapted Screenplay co-winner

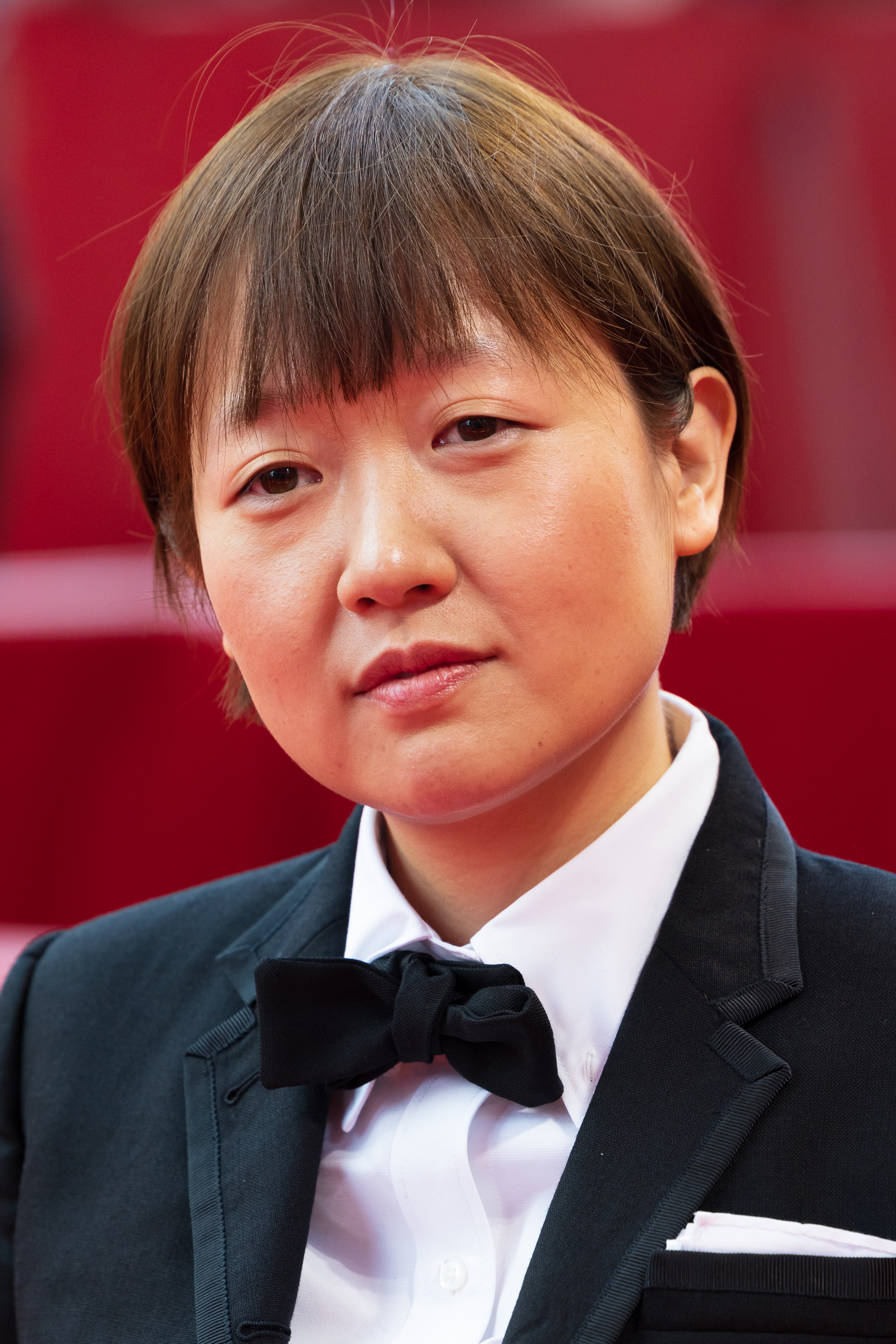
Celine Song, Milos Stehlik Award for Breakthrough Filmmaker winner

=== Awards ===
Best Film	Best Director
Killers of the Flower Moon; Barbie; May December; Oppenheimer; Poor Things	Christopher Nolan – Oppenheimer; Greta Gerwig – Barbie; Todd Haynes – May December; Yorgos Lanthimos – Poor Things; Martin Scorsese – Killers of the Flower Moon
Best Actor	Best Actress
Paul Giamatti – The Holdovers as Paul Hunham; Leonardo DiCaprio – Killers of the Flower Moon as Ernest Burkhart; Cillian Murphy – Oppenheimer as J. Robert Oppenheimer; Andrew Scott – All of Us Strangers as Adam; Teo Yoo – Past Lives as Hae Sung	Emma Stone – Poor Things as Bella Baxter; Lily Gladstone – Killers of the Flower Moon as Mollie Burkhart; Sandra Hüller – Anatomy of a Fall as Sandra Voyter; Natalie Portman – May December as Elizabeth Berry; Margot Robbie – Barbie as Barbie
Best Supporting Actor	Best Supporting Actress
Charles Melton – May December as Joe Yoo; Robert Downey Jr. – Oppenheimer as Lewis Strauss; Ryan Gosling – Barbie as Ken; Glenn Howerton – BlackBerry as Jim Balsillie; Mark Ruffalo – Poor Things as Duncan Wedderburn	Da'Vine Joy Randolph – The Holdovers as Mary Lamb; Jodie Foster – Nyad as Bonnie Stoll; Sandra Hüller – The Zone of Interest as Hedwig Höss; Rachel McAdams – Are You There God? It's Me, Margaret. as Barbara Simon; Julianne Moore – May December as Gracie Atherton-Yoo
Best Original Screenplay	Best Adapted Screenplay
May December – Samy Burch; Anatomy of a Fall – Arthur Harari and Justine Triet; Barbie – Greta Gerwig and Noah Baumbach; The Holdovers – David Hemingson; Past Lives – Celine Song	Killers of the Flower Moon – Eric Roth and Martin Scorsese; Are You There God? It's Me, Margaret. – Kelly Fremon Craig; Oppenheimer – Christopher Nolan; Poor Things – Tony McNamara; The Zone of Interest – Jonathan Glazer
Best Animated Film	Best Foreign Language Film
The Boy and the Heron; Leo; Robot Dreams; Spider-Man: Across the Spider-Verse; Teenage Mutant Ninja Turtles: Mutant Mayhem	The Zone of Interest (United Kingdom); Anatomy of a Fall (France); The Boy and the Heron (Japan); Godzilla Minus One (Japan); The Teachers' Lounge (Germany)
Best Documentary Film	Best Original Score
Kokomo City; 20 Days in Mariupol; Beyond Utopia; Menus-Plaisirs – Les Troisgros; Still: A Michael J. Fox Movie	Killers of the Flower Moon – Robbie Robertson (posthumous); Barbie – Mark Ronson and Andrew Wyatt; Oppenheimer – Ludwig Göransson; Poor Things – Jerskin Fendrix; The Zone of Interest – Mica Levi
Best Art Direction / Production Design	Best Costume Design
Barbie; Asteroid City; Killers of the Flower Moon; Oppenheimer; Poor Things	Poor Things – Holly Waddington; Asteroid City – Milena Canonero; Barbie – Jacqueline Durran; Killers of the Flower Moon – Jacqueline West; Priscilla – Stacey Battat
Best Editing	Best Cinematography
Oppenheimer – Jennifer Lame; All Dirt Roads Taste of Salt – Lee Chatametikool; John Wick: Chapter 4 – Nathan Orloff; Killers of the Flower Moon – Thelma Schoonmaker; Mission: Impossible – Dead Reckoning Part One – Eddie Hamilton	Oppenheimer – Hoyte van Hoytema; Asteroid City – Robert D. Yeoman; Killers of the Flower Moon – Rodrigo Prieto; Poor Things – Robbie Ryan; The Zone of Interest – Łukasz Żal
Best Use of Visual Effects	Milos Stehlik Award for Breakthrough Filmmaker
Godzilla Minus One; Barbie; Mission: Impossible – Dead Reckoning Part One; Oppenheimer; Poor Things	Celine Song – Past Lives; Kyle Edward Ball – Skinamarink; Raven Jackson – All Dirt Roads Taste of Salt; Cord Jefferson – American Fiction; A. V. Rockwell – A Thousand and One
Most Promising Performer
Charles Melton – May December as Joe Yoo; Abby Ryder Fortson – Are You There God? It's Me, Margaret. as Margaret Simon; Milo Machado-Graner – Anatomy of a Fall as Daniel Maleski; Dominic Sessa – The Holdovers as Angus Tully; Teo Yoo – Past Lives as Hae Sung

== Awards breakdown ==
The following films received multiple nominations:

Nominations	Film
10	Killers of the Flower Moon
10	Oppenheimer
10	Poor Things
9	Barbie
7	May December
5	The Zone of Interest
4	Anatomy of a Fall
4	The Holdovers
4	Past Lives
3	Are You There God? It's Me, Margaret.
3	Asteroid City
2	All Dirt Roads Taste of Salt
2	The Boy and the Heron
2	Godzilla Minus One
2	Mission: Impossible – Dead Reckoning Part One

The following films received multiple wins:

Wins	Film
3	Killers of the Flower Moon
3	May December
3	Oppenheimer
2	The Holdovers
2	Poor Things
