= Black Reel Award for Outstanding Emerging Director =

Award presented annually by the Black Reel Awards

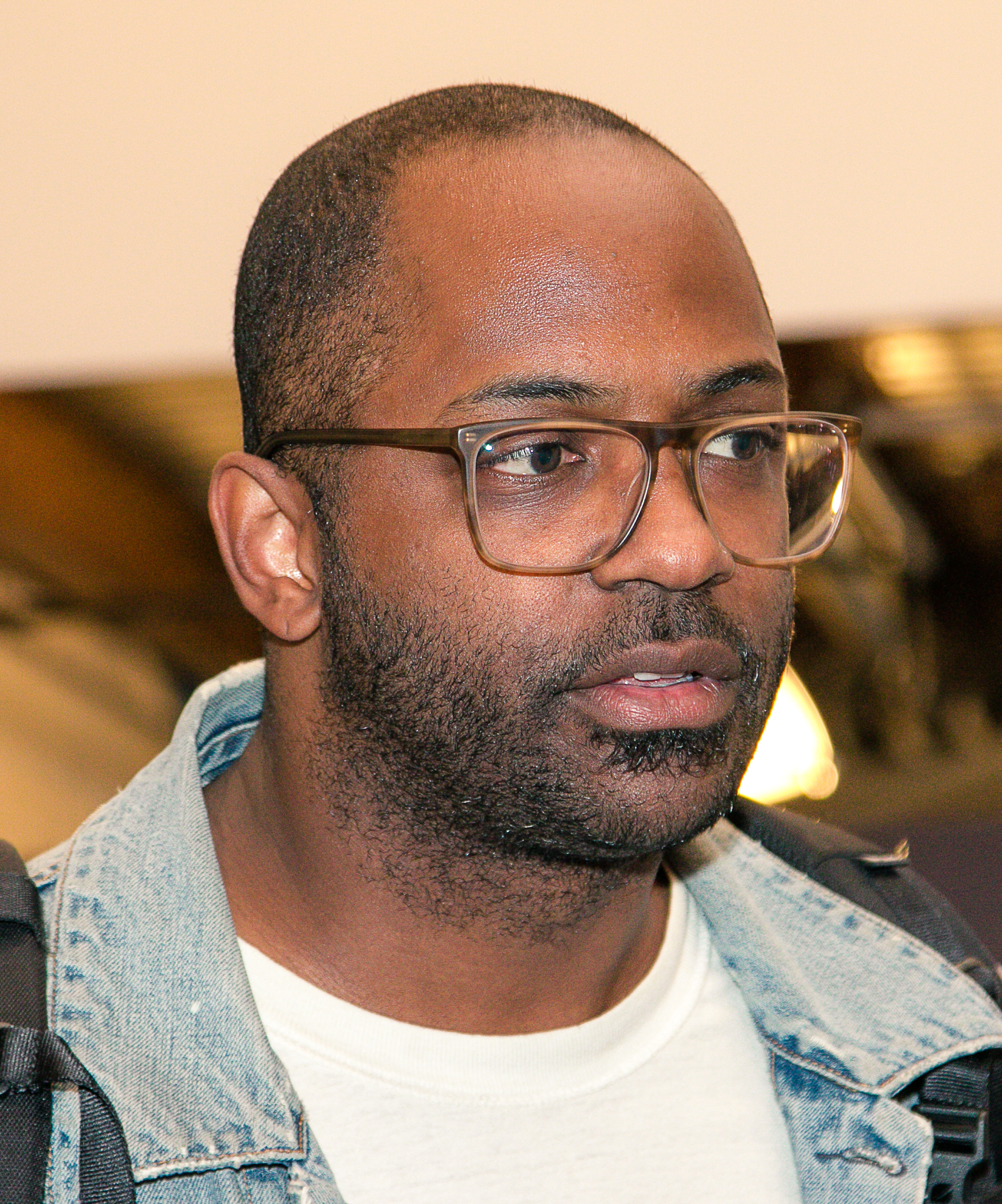
- The 2025 recipient: RaMell Ross
- Awarded for: Outstanding Emerging Director
- Country: United States
- Presented by: Black Reel Awards (BRAs)
- First award: 2017
- Most recent winner: RaMell Ross; Nickel Boys (2025)
- Website: blackreelawards.com

This article lists the winners and nominees for the Black Reel Award for Outstanding Emerging Director. The award is given to the directors for their first directorial debut.

== Winners and nominees ==
=== 2010s ===
Year	Director	Film	Ref.
2017	Ezra Edelman	O.J.: Made in America	
2017	Steven Caple Jr.	The Land	
2017	Tahir Jetter	How to Tell You're a Douchebag	
2017	Rita Coburn Whack	Maya Angelou and Still I Rise	
2017	Yared Zeleke	Lamb	
2018	Jordan Peele	Get Out	
2018	Maggie Betts	Novitiate	
2018	Damon Davis and Sabaah Folayan	Whose Streets?	
2018	J.D. Dillard	Sleight	
2018	Malik Vitthal	Imperial Dreams	
2019	Boots Riley	Sorry to Bother You	
2019	Idris Elba	Yardie	
2019	Rashida Jones	Quincy	
2019	Nijla Mumin	Jinn	
2019	Reinaldo Marcus Green	Monsters and Men	

=== 2020s ===
Year	Director	Film	Ref.
2020	Melina Matsoukas	Queen & Slim	
2020	Nia DaCosta	Little Woods	
2020	Mati Diop	Atlantics	
2020	Chinonye Chukwu	Clemency	
2020	Julius Onah	Luce	
2021	Regina King	One Night in Miami...	
2021	Eugene Ashe	Sylvie's Love	
2021	Radha Blank	The Forty-Year-Old Version	
2021	Shaka King	Judas and the Black Messiah	
2021	Channing Godfrey Peoples	Miss Juneteenth	
2022	Jeymes Samuel	The Harder They Fall	
2022	Halle Berry	Bruised	
2022	Janicza Bravo	Zola	
2022	Rebecca Hall	Passing	
2022	Ahmir "Questlove" Thompson	Summer of Soul	
2023	Nikyatu Jusu	Nanny	
2023	Elegance Bratton	The Inspection	
2023	Adamma Ebo	Honk for Jesus. Save Your Soul.	
2023	Elvis Mitchell	Is That Black Enough for You?!?	
2023	Carey Williams	Emergency	
2024	Cord Jefferson	American Fiction	
2024	Blitz the Ambassador	The Color Purple	
2024	Raven Jackson	All Dirt Roads Taste of Salt	
2024	A. V. Rockwell	A Thousand and One	
2024	Juel Taylor	They Cloned Tyrone	
2025	RaMell Ross	Nickel Boys	
2025	Titus Kaphar	Exhibiting Forgiveness	
2025	Zoë Kravitz	Blink Twice	
2025	Angela Patton	Daughters	
2025	Malcolm Washington	The Piano Lesson	
2026	R. T. Thorne	40 Acres	
2026	Akinola Davies Jr.	My Father's Shadow	
2026	Rachael Holder	Love, Brooklyn	
2026	Kahlil Joseph	BLKNWS: Terms & Conditions	
2026	Rungano Nyoni	On Becoming a Guinea Fowl	
