= Florida Film Critics Circle Awards 2023 =

Annual US film awards ceremony

28th FFCC Awards

December 21, 2023

Best Picture:
The Boy and the Heron

The 28th Florida Film Critics Circle Awards were held on December 21, 2023.

The nominations were announced on December 13, 2023, led by Oppenheimer with ten nominations, followed by Killers of the Flower Moon with eight and May December with seven.

== Winners and nominees ==
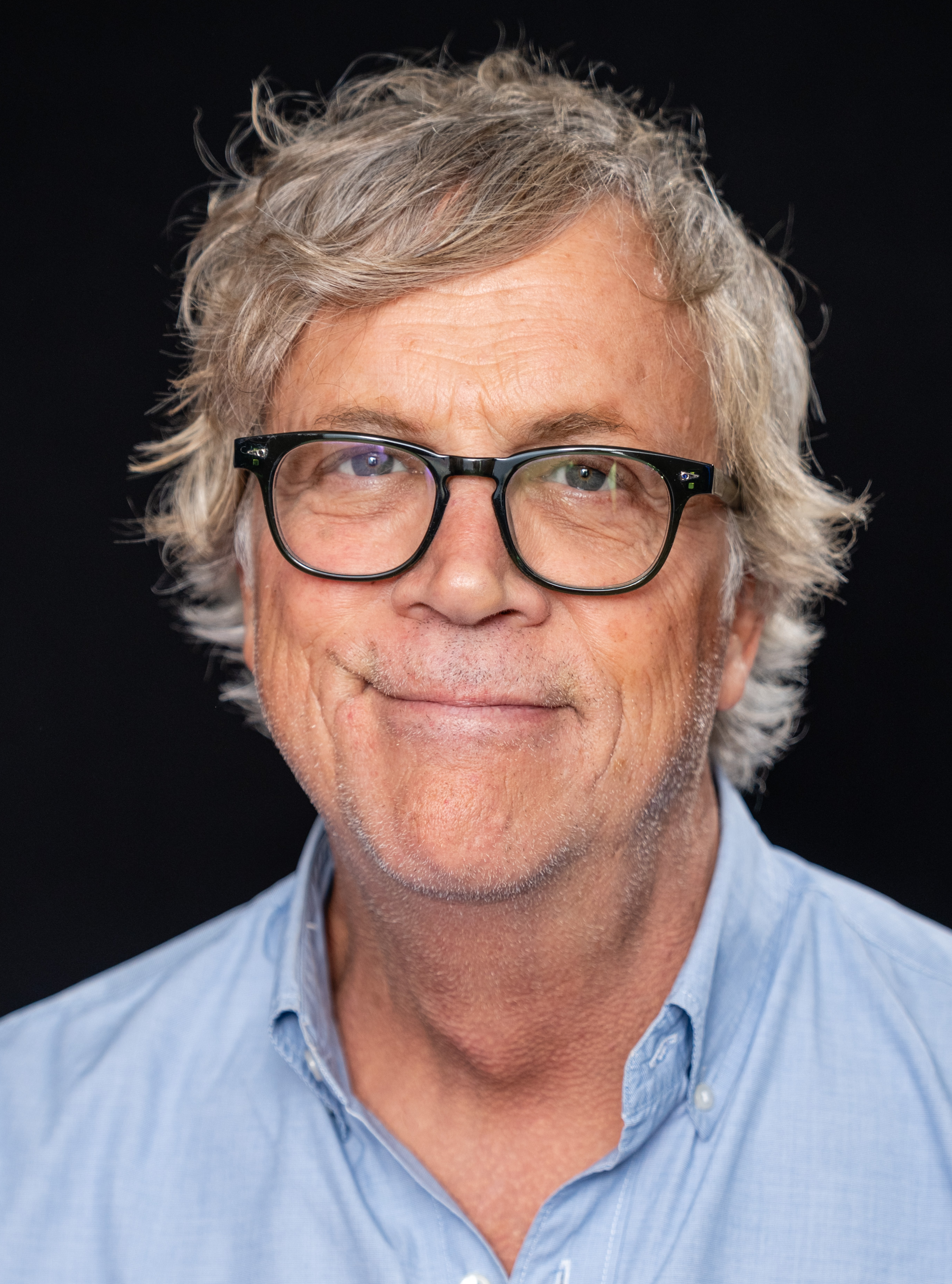
Todd Haynes, Best Director winner

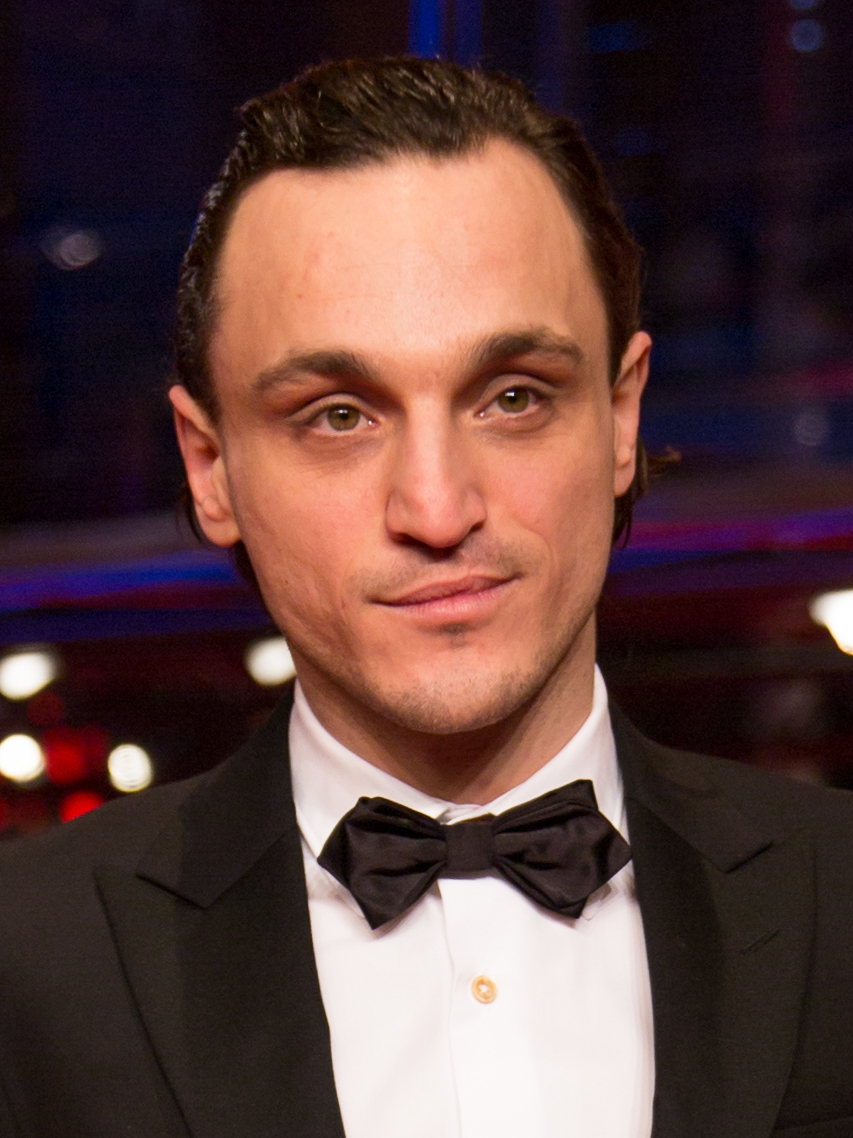
Franz Rogowski, Best Actor winner

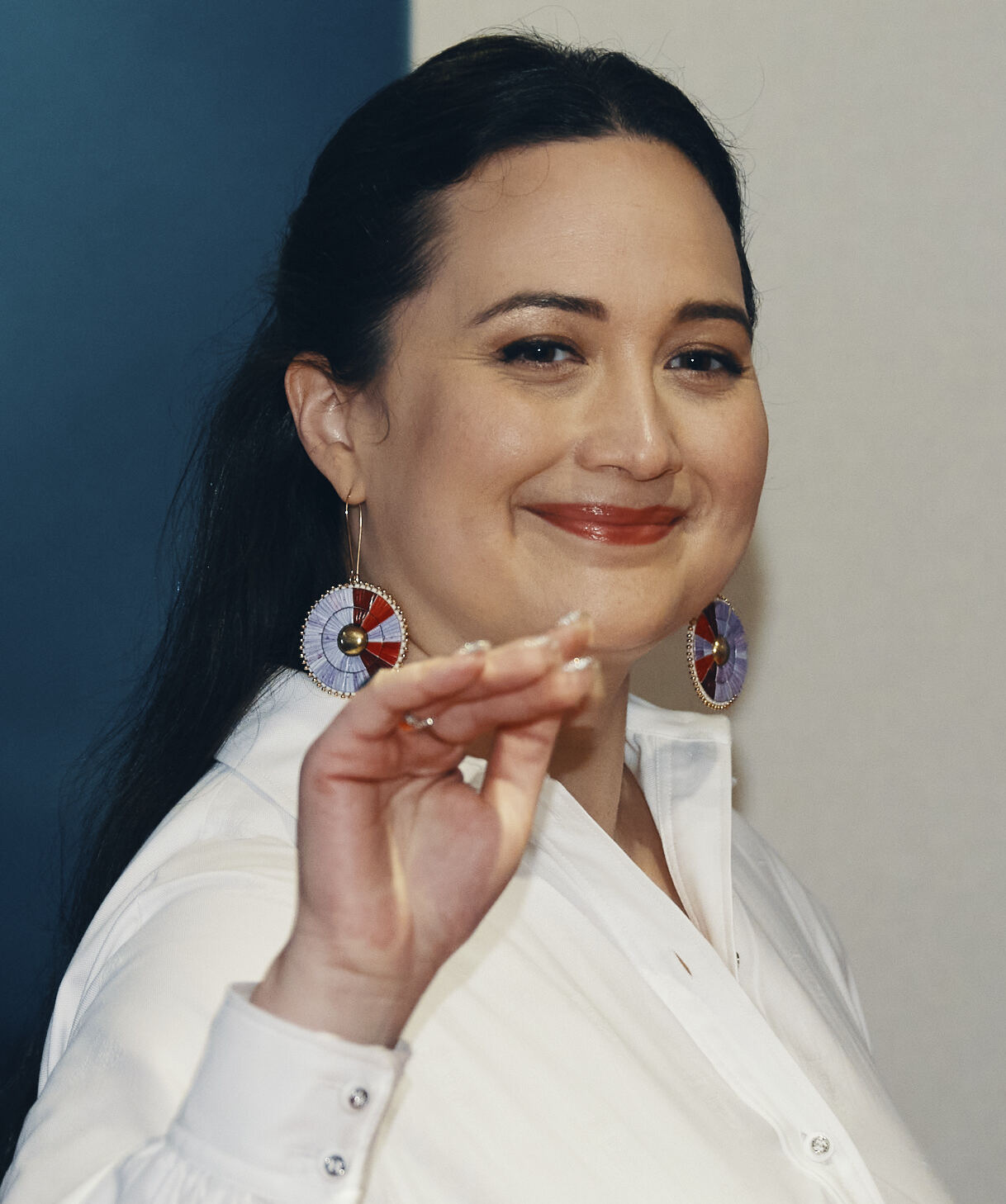
Lily Gladstone, Best Actress and Breakout Award winner

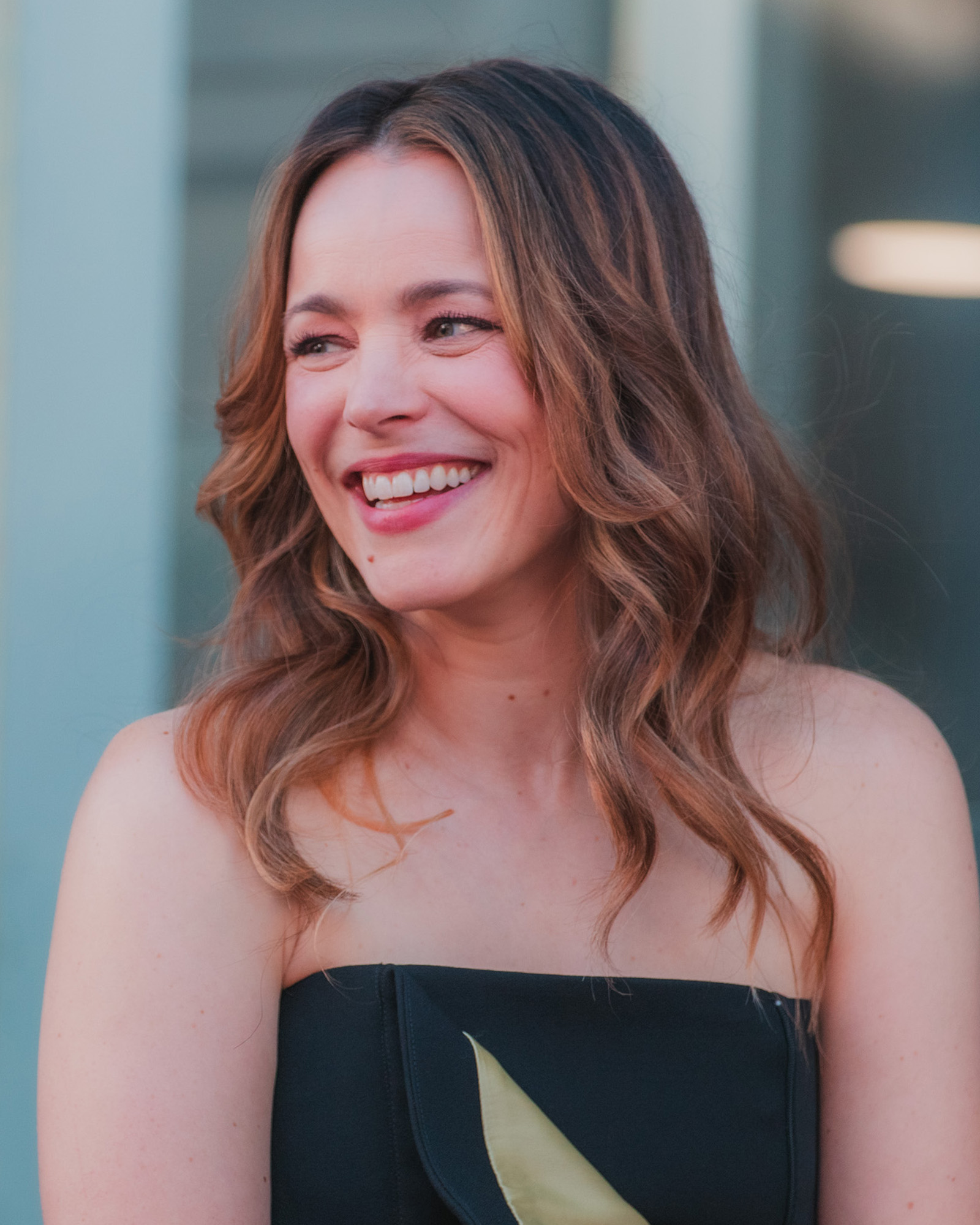
Rachel McAdams, Best Supporting Actress winner

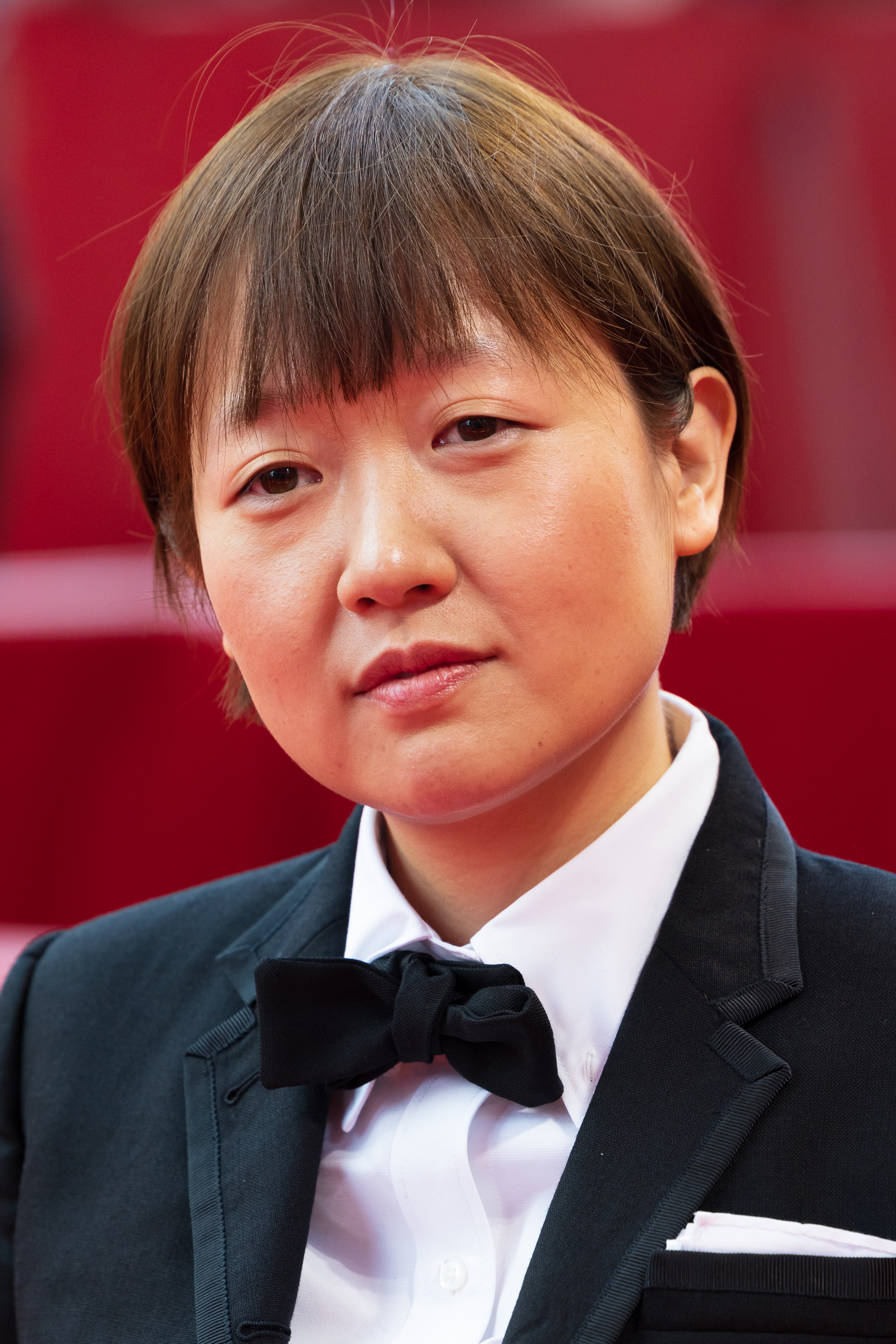
Celine Song, Best Original Screenplay and Best First Film winner

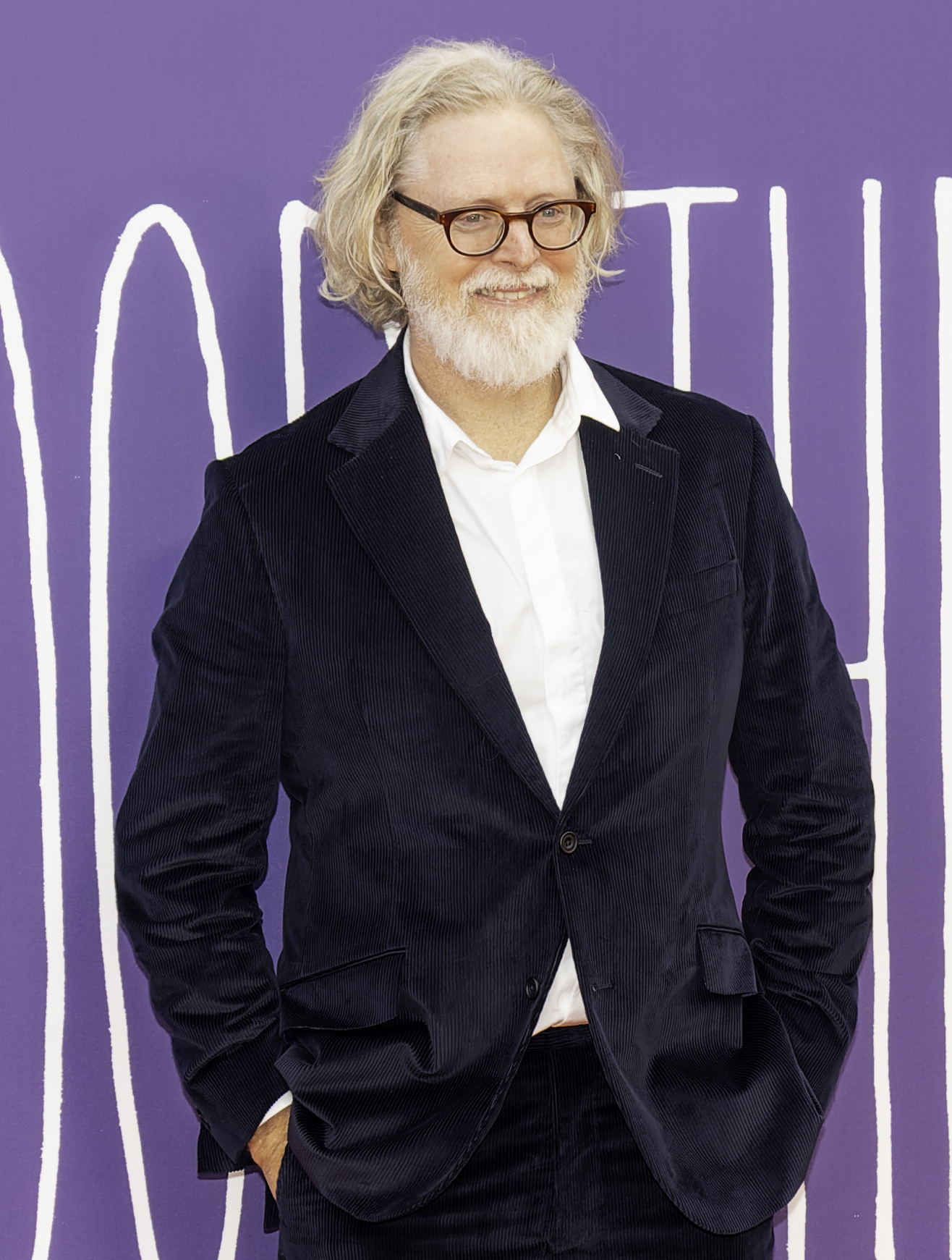
Tony McNamara, Best Adapted Screenplay winner

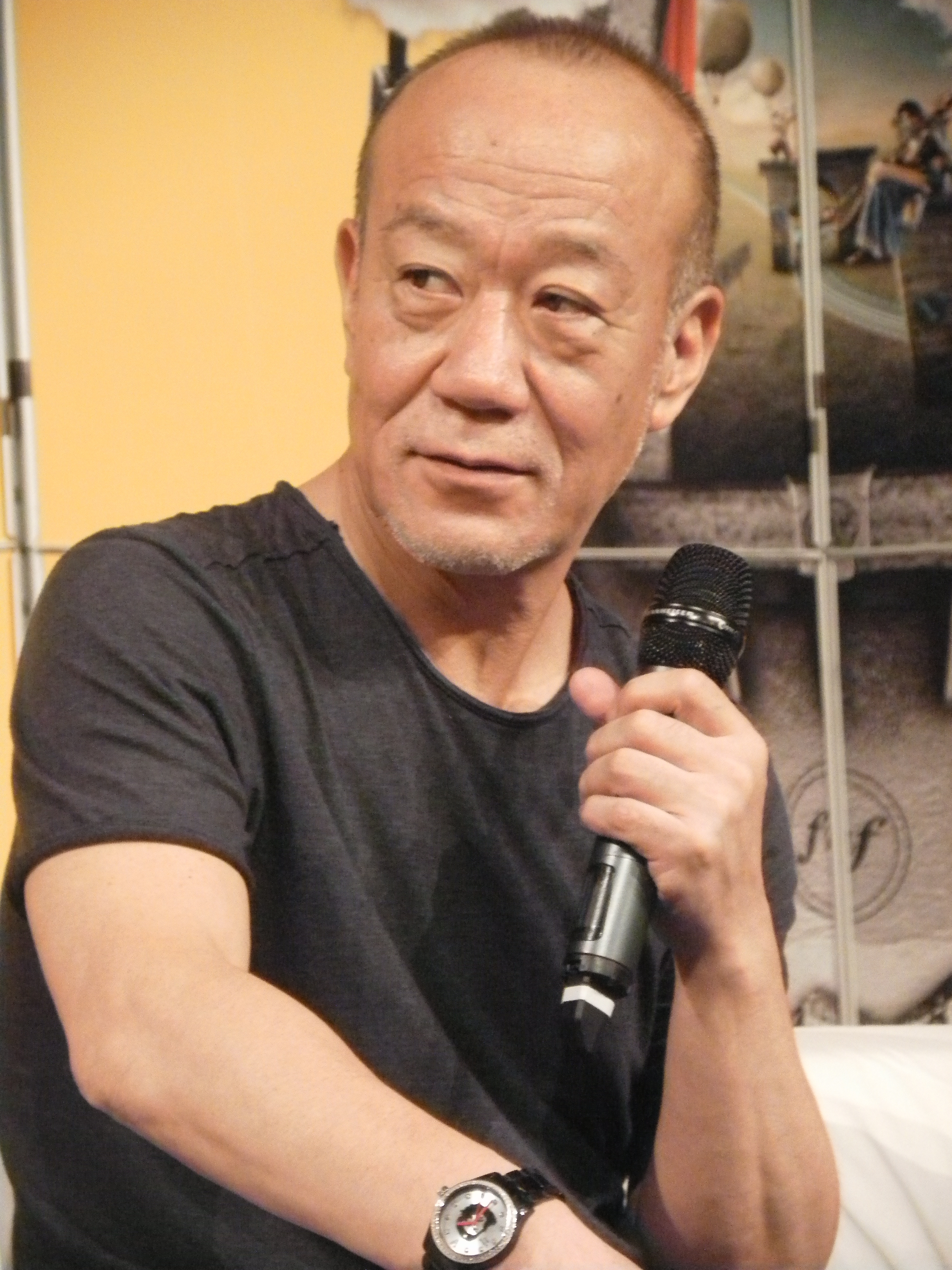
Joe Hisaishi, Best Score winner

Winners are listed at the top of each list in bold, while the runner-ups for each category are listed under them.

Best Picture	Best Director
**The Boy and the Heron**: Runner-up: May December; Killers of the Flower Moon; Oppenheimer; Past Lives	**Todd Haynes – May December**: Runner-up: Christopher Nolan – Oppenheimer; Wes Anderson – Asteroid City; Jonathan Glazer – The Zone of Interest; Celine Song – Past Lives
Best Actor	Best Actress
**Franz Rogowski – Passages as Thomas Freiburg**: Runner-up: Bradley Cooper – Maestro as Leonard Bernstein; Paul Giamatti – The Holdovers as Paul Hunham; Cillian Murphy – Oppenheimer as J. Robert Oppenheimer; Andrew Scott – All of Us Strangers as Adam	**Lily Gladstone – Killers of the Flower Moon as Mollie Burkhart**: Runner-up: Sandra Hüller – Anatomy of a Fall as Sandra Voyter; Runner-up: Emma Stone – Poor Things as Bella Baxter; Natalie Portman – May December as Elizabeth Berry; Teyana Taylor – A Thousand and One as Inez de la Paz
Best Supporting Actor	Best Supporting Actress
**Charles Melton – May December as Joe Yoo**: Runner-up: Robert Downey Jr. – Oppenheimer as Lewis Strauss; Mark Ruffalo – Poor Things as Duncan Wedderburn; Dominic Sessa – The Holdovers as Angus Tully; Donnie Yen – John Wick: Chapter 4 as Caine	**Rachel McAdams – Are You There God? It's Me, Margaret. as Barbara Simon**: Runner-up: Da'Vine Joy Randolph – The Holdovers as Mary Lamb; Emily Blunt – Oppenheimer as Katherine "Kitty" Oppenheimer; Julianne Moore – May December as Gracie Atherton-Yoo; Sigourney Weaver – Master Gardener as Norma Haverhill
Best Original Screenplay	Best Adapted Screenplay
**Celine Song – Past Lives**: Runner-up: Wes Anderson – Asteroid City; Samy Burch – May December; David Hemingson – The Holdovers; Justine Triet and Arthur Harari – Anatomy of a Fall	**Tony McNamara – Poor Things**: Runner-up: Eric Roth and Martin Scorsese – Killers of the Flower Moon; Kelly Fremon Craig – Are You There God? It's Me, Margaret.; Cord Jefferson – American Fiction; Christopher Nolan – Oppenheimer
Best Animated Film	Best Documentary Film
**The Boy and the Heron**: Runner-up: None; Robot Dreams; Spider-Man: Across the Spider-Verse; Suzume; Teenage Mutant Ninja Turtles: Mutant Mayhem	**Menus-Plaisirs – Les Troisgros**: Runner-up: The Eternal Memory; Kokomo City; Little Richard: I Am Everything; Still: A Michael J. Fox Movie
Best Foreign Language Film	Best Ensemble
**Anatomy of a Fall**: Runner-up: The Zone of Interest; The Boy and the Heron; Godzilla Minus One	**Killers of the Flower Moon**: Runner-up: Asteroid City; Barbie; How to Blow Up a Pipeline; Oppenheimer
Best Art Direction / Production Design	Best Cinematography
**Asteroid City**: Runner-up: Poor Things; Barbie; Killers of the Flower Moon; The Zone of Interest	**Dan Laustsen – John Wick: Chapter 4**: Runner-up: Hoyte van Hoytema – Oppenheimer; Rodrigo Prieto – Killers of the Flower Moon; Robbie Ryan – Poor Things; Łukasz Żal – The Zone of Interest
Best Score	Best Visual Effects
**Joe Hisaishi – The Boy and the Heron**: Runner-up: Ludwig Göransson – Oppenheimer; Gary Gunn – A Thousand and One; Daniel Pemberton – Spider-Man: Across the Spider-Verse; Robbie Robertson – Killers of the Flower Moon	**Godzilla Minus One**: Runner-up: The Creator; Runner-up: Oppenheimer; Poor Things; Spider-Man: Across the Spider-Verse
Best First Film	Breakout Award
**Celine Song – Past Lives**: Runner-up: A. V. Rockwell – A Thousand and One; Raven Jackson – All Dirt Roads Taste of Salt; Cord Jefferson – American Fiction; Georgia Oakley – Blue Jean	**Lily Gladstone – Killers of the Flower Moon as Mollie Burkhart**: Runner-up: Charles Melton – May December as Joe Yoo; Runner-up: Celine Song – Past Lives; Dominic Sessa – The Holdovers as Angus Tully; Cailee Spaeny – Priscilla as Priscilla Presley
Golden Orange
**D. Smith – Kokomo City**; Runner-up: Alex Mechanik – May December; Eric Bendick – Path of the Panther
