= A Thousand and One =

2023 film by A. V. Rockwell

- Theatrical release poster
- Directed by: A. V. Rockwell
- Written by: A. V. Rockwell
- Produced by: Eddie Vaisman; Julia Lebedev; Lena Waithe; Rishi Rajani; Brad Weston
- Starring: Teyana Taylor; Will Catlett; Josiah Cross; Aven Courtney; Aaron Kingsley Adetola
- Cinematography: Eric K. Yue
- Edited by: Sabine Hoffman; Kristan Sprague
- Music by: Gary Gunn
- Production companies: Sight Unseen; Hillman Grad Productions; Makeready
- Distributed by: Focus Features (United States); Universal Pictures (International)
- Release dates: January 22, 2023 (Sundance); March 31, 2023 (United States)
- Running time: 116 minutes
- Country: United States
- Language: English
- Box office: $3.5 million

A Thousand and One is a 2023 American drama film written and directed by A. V. Rockwell in her feature directorial debut. The film stars Teyana Taylor, Will Catlett, Josiah Cross, Aven Courtney, and Aaron Kingsley Adetola. Set between the 1990s and 2000s, it focuses on a single mother who decides to kidnap her son out of the foster care system to raise him herself, as the two struggle with life in a constantly changing New York City.

The film premiered at the 2023 Sundance Film Festival on January 22, and won the Grand Jury Prize. Upon its theatrical release on March 31, 2023 by Focus Features, it received critical acclaim and grossed $3.5 million at the box office. It was named one of the top ten independent films of 2023 by the National Board of Review.

== Plot ==
In 1994, hairdresser and convicted thief Inez de la Paz is released from Rikers Island and returns to the Brooklyn neighborhood of her former shelter, where she sees six-year-old Terry with other children from his foster home out on the street. When Terry is hospitalized after trying to escape from the home, Inez secretly visits him. He tells her about his earliest memory: of Inez abandoning him on a street corner when he was two years old.

Inez notifies Terry that they will lose contact again when he is placed at a new foster home. Visibly shaken after he accuses her of repeated abandonment, Inez asks if Terry wants to come live with her. When he says yes, Inez impulsively abducts him from the hospital, escaping to her childhood neighborhood of Harlem.

Inez and Terry stay at a variety of homes until she saves up enough money from a new job at a nursing home to afford an apartment. During a conversation with Ms. Annie, from whom Inez rents a room for a short time, it's implied that Inez lost her parents during the crack epidemic. She arranges a false birth certificate and social security card for Terry so that she can enroll him in school and reunites with an old boyfriend and fellow thief named Lucky. Though seemingly uncomfortable with the situation, he and Inez get married and he promises to take care of Terry. Both Inez and Lucky invest in Mayor Rudy Giuliani's promise of an improved city, in hopes that it will offer a better upbringing for Terry than their own.

Harlem continues to change despite highly reported cases of police brutality throughout the city, culminating with Giuliani's rollout of stop-and-frisk. By 2001, Inez still lives in the same apartment with Terry though her marriage to Lucky has become strained due to his long absences and infidelities. Terry excels at his schoolwork despite these problems at home and continual harassment from police and is recommended for placement in a STEM-based specialized school.

Terry does not want to go due to dreams of becoming a composer but agrees to take the placement exam to satisfy Inez and Lucky's wishes for him to have a better life than they have had. Inez fails to reconcile with Lucky, but he affirms his love for and support of Terry, which convinces Terry to go. Michael Bloomberg becomes the next mayor, and the Harlem area continues to evolve with the tearing down of local and historic institutions as nationwide chain stores and luxury housing developments are introduced.

In 2005, Lucky gradually succumbs to cancer in the hospital as Terry prepares for college and their new landlord attempts to drive them out of the apartment. When his guidance counselor asks for his birth certificate and social security card for a job, Terry gives her his forged ones without telling Inez. When the documents come back as invalid, a reluctant Terry reveals the deception, prompting the counselor to call social services. Terry warns Inez, who flees before social services arrive and reveal to Terry that she is not his biological mother at all, putting him in another home.

Terry flees the home and after Inez's best friend, Kim, invites him to live with her, returns to the apartment, where he finds Inez collecting her belongings. She confesses that she is not the woman who abandoned Terry on the street corner in his memory, but the woman who found him and treated him like a son ever since. Terry affirms that he still loves her as a mother, but the two separate once again. Before entering a taxi to an uncertain future, Inez promises Terry that "this isn't goodbye".

== Cast ==
- Teyana Taylor as Inez de la Paz
- Aaron Kingsley Adetola as Terry (6 years old)
- Aven Courtney as Terry (13 years old)
- Josiah Cross as Terry (17 years old)
- Will Catlett as Lucky
- Terri Abney as Kim Jones

== Production ==
In December 2020, it was announced A.V. Rockwell would write and direct the film, with Lena Waithe set to serve as a producer under Hillman Grad Productions banner, and Focus Features set to distribute. In July 2021, Teyana Taylor joined the cast of the film.

The film was shot in 2021, which Rockwell described as difficult due to COVID and the increased development that New York City saw during that period. "If you thought gentrification was going crazy, it went on steroids over the pandemic," she said. "So, I do feel like if we would’ve waited even just a summer longer, I don’t know if we would’ve been able to make this movie in New York."

== Release ==
It had its world premiere at the 2023 Sundance Film Festival on January 22, 2023. The film was released on March 31, 2023, by Focus Features.

== Reception ==
=== Box office ===
Released alongside His Only Son, Dungeons & Dragons: Honor Among Thieves, and the wide expansion of A Good Person, the film made $700,000 from 926 theaters on its first day and went on to debut to $1.72 million, finishing in seventh.

=== Critical response ===
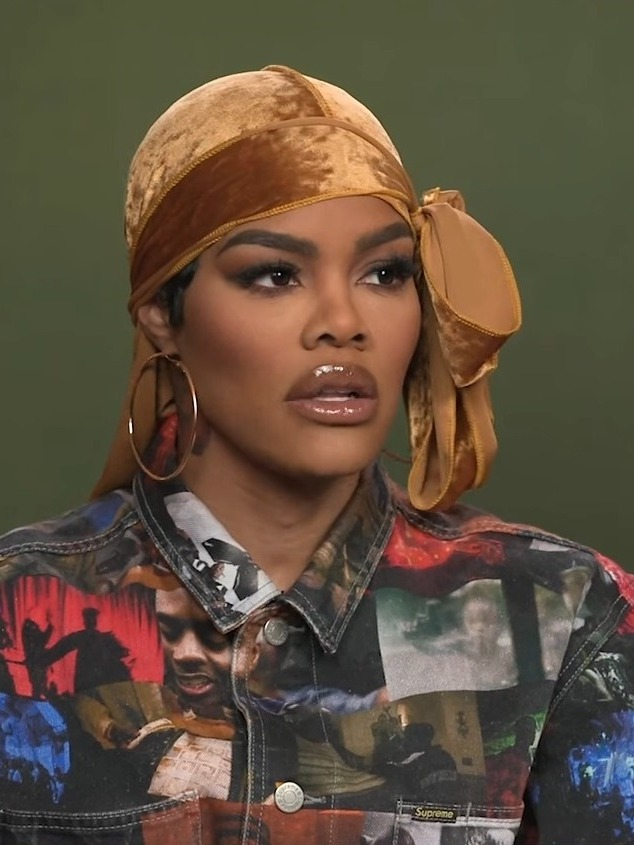
Teyana Taylor received critical acclaim for her performance as Inez de la Paz.

On the review aggregator website Rotten Tomatoes, 97% of 127 critics' reviews are positive, with an average rating of 8.10/10. The website's consensus reads: "A tribute to parental devotion and a testament to Teyana Taylor's talent, A Thousand and One presents a heart-wrenching portrait of perseverance in the face of systemic inequity." Metacritic, which uses a weighted average, assigned the film a score of 81 out of 100, based on 30 critics, indicating "universal acclaim".

Audiences surveyed by CinemaScore gave the film an average grade of "B+" on an A+ to F scale, while those polled by PostTrak gave it a 76% positive score, with 63% saying they would definitely recommend it.

In June 2025, IndieWire ranked the film at number 73 on its list of "The 100 Best Movies of the 2020s (So Far)."

=== Accolades ===
Award	Date of ceremony	Category	Recipient(s)	Result	Ref.
Sundance Film Festival	January 27, 2023	Grand Jury Prize – Dramatic	A Thousand and One	Won	
Hollywood Critics Association Midseason Film Awards	June 30, 2023	Best Indie	A Thousand and One	Nominated	
Hollywood Critics Association Midseason Film Awards	June 30, 2023	Best Actress	Teyana Taylor	Nominated	
Jerusalem Film Festival	July 23, 2023	Best International Debut	A Thousand and One	Nominated	
Gotham Independent Film Awards	November 27, 2023	Best Feature	A Thousand and One	Nominated	
Gotham Independent Film Awards	November 27, 2023	Breakthrough Director	A. V. Rockwell	Won	
Gotham Independent Film Awards	November 27, 2023	Outstanding Lead Performance	Teyana Taylor	Nominated	
Celebration of Cinema & Television	December 4, 2023	Breakthrough Performance Award	Teyana Taylor	Won	
National Board of Review	December 6, 2023	Top 10 Independent Films	A Thousand and One	Won	
National Board of Review	December 6, 2023	Breakthrough Performance	Teyana Taylor	Won	
Boston Society of Film Critics Awards	December 10, 2023	Best New Filmmaker	A. V. Rockwell	Runner-up (Note: Shared with Cord Jefferson for American Fiction.)	
IndieWire Critics Poll	December 11, 2023	Best First Feature	A Thousand and One	3rd Place	
Chicago Film Critics Association Awards	December 12, 2023	Milos Stehlik Award for Breakthrough Filmmaker	A. V. Rockwell	Nominated	
Toronto Film Critics Association	December 17, 2023	Best Breakthrough Performance	Teyana Taylor	Won	
Women Film Critics Circle Awards	December 18, 2023	Best Movie About Women	A Thousand and One	Nominated	
Women Film Critics Circle Awards	December 18, 2023	Best Actress	Teyana Taylor	Nominated	
Women Film Critics Circle Awards	December 18, 2023	Josephine Baker Award	A Thousand and One	Nominated	
Women Film Critics Circle Awards	December 18, 2023	Karen Morley Award	A Thousand and One	Nominated	
Indiana Film Journalists Association	December 18, 2023	Best Picture	A Thousand and One	Nominated	
Indiana Film Journalists Association	December 18, 2023	Best Original Screenplay	A. V. Rockwell	Nominated	
Indiana Film Journalists Association	December 18, 2023	Best Lead Performance	Teyana Taylor	Nominated	
Indiana Film Journalists Association	December 18, 2023	Best Ensemble Acting	A Thousand and One	Nominated	
Indiana Film Journalists Association	December 18, 2023	Breakout of the Year	Josiah Cross	Nominated	
San Diego Film Critics Society	December 19, 2023	Best First Feature	A. V. Rockwell	Nominated	
Florida Film Critics Circle Awards	December 21, 2023	Best Actress	Teyana Taylor	Nominated	
Florida Film Critics Circle Awards	December 21, 2023	Best Score	Gary Gunn	Nominated	
Florida Film Critics Circle Awards	December 21, 2023	Best First Film	A. V. Rockwell	Runner-up	
Astra Film Awards	January 6, 2024	Best First Feature	A. V. Rockwell	Nominated	
Austin Film Critics Association Awards	January 10, 2024	Best First Film	A. V. Rockwell	Nominated	
African-American Film Critics Association	January 15, 2024	Best Independent Feature	A Thousand and One	Won	
Black Reel Awards	January 16, 2024	Outstanding Director	A. V. Rockwell	Nominated	
Black Reel Awards	January 16, 2024	Outstanding Lead Performance	Teyana Taylor	Nominated	
Black Reel Awards	January 16, 2024	Outstanding Breakthrough Performance	Teyana Taylor	Nominated	
Black Reel Awards	January 16, 2024	Outstanding Emerging Director	A. V. Rockwell	Nominated	
Black Reel Awards	January 16, 2024	Outstanding Screenplay	A. V. Rockwell	Nominated	
Black Reel Awards	January 16, 2024	Outstanding First Screenplay	A. V. Rockwell	Nominated	
Black Reel Awards	January 16, 2024	Outstanding Independent Film	A Thousand and One	Won	
Black Reel Awards	January 16, 2024	Outstanding Hairstyle and Make-Up	Craig Carter	Nominated	
Directors Guild of America Awards	February 10, 2024	Outstanding Directing – First-Time Feature Film	A. V. Rockwell	Nominated	
Independent Spirit Awards	February 25, 2024	Best First Feature	A. V. Rockwell, Julia Lebedev, Rishi Rajani, Eddie Vaisman, Lena Waithe, and Brad Weston	Won	
Independent Spirit Awards	February 25, 2024	Best Lead Performance	Teyana Taylor	Nominated	
NAACP Image Awards	March 16, 2024	Outstanding Actress in a Motion Picture	Teyana Taylor	Nominated	
NAACP Image Awards	March 16, 2024	Outstanding Breakthrough Performance in a Motion Picture	Teyana Taylor	Nominated	
NAACP Image Awards	March 16, 2024	Outstanding Breakthrough Creative (Motion Picture)	A. V. Rockwell	Nominated	
NAACP Image Awards	March 16, 2024	Outstanding Writing in a Motion Picture	A. V. Rockwell	Nominated	
NAACP Image Awards	March 16, 2024	Outstanding Youth Performance in a Motion Picture	Aaron Kingsley Adetola	Nominated	
NAACP Image Awards	March 16, 2024	Outstanding Youth Performance in a Motion Picture	Aven Courtnery	Nominated	
NAACP Image Awards	March 16, 2024	Outstanding Cinematography in a Feature Film	Eric K. Yue	Won	

== Notes ==
Awards
Preceded by Nanny	Sundance Grand Jury Prize: U.S. Dramatic; 2023	Succeeded by In the Summers
