= Florida Film Critics Circle Award for Best Actor =

Annual US film award

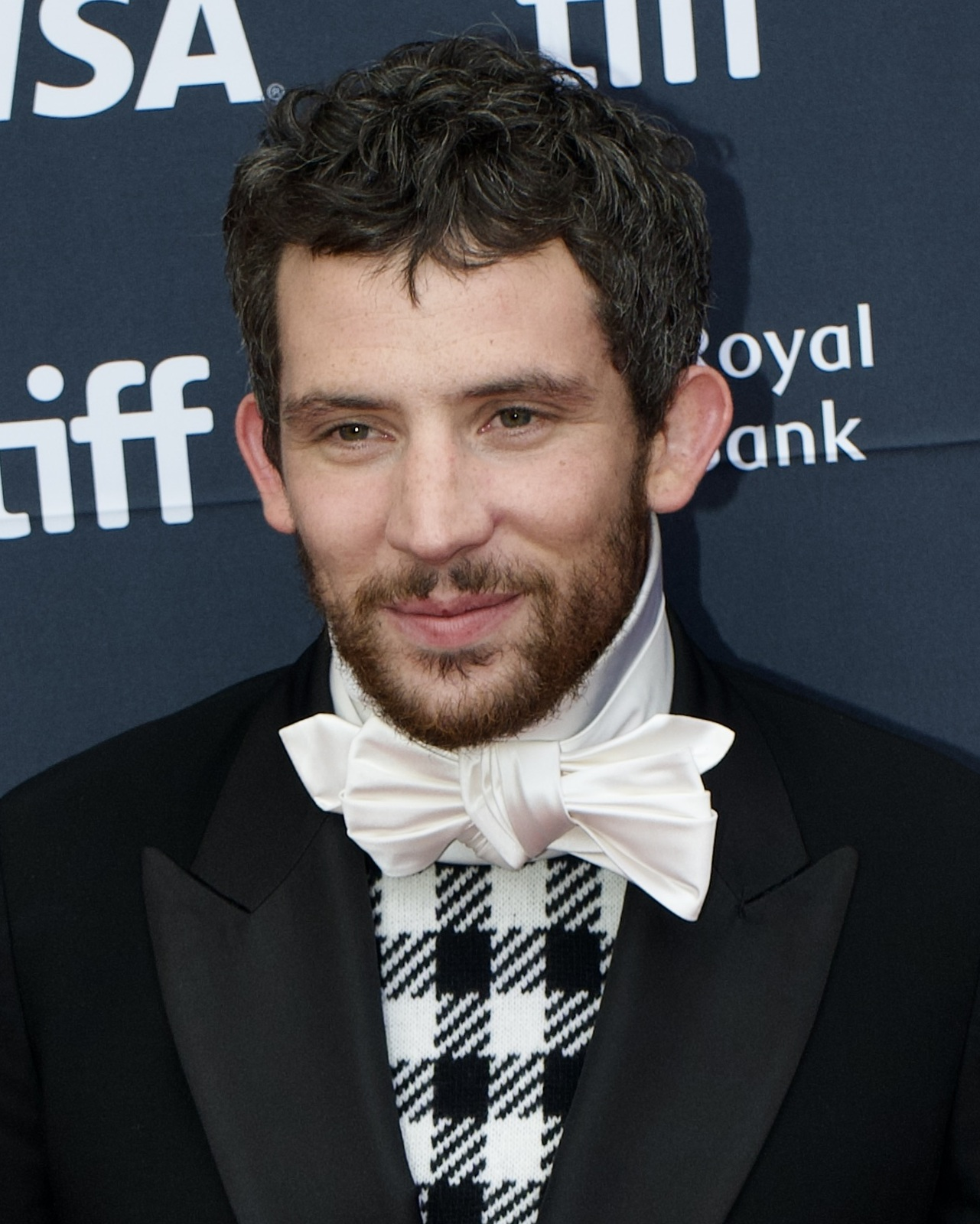
- The 2025 recipient: Josh O'Connor
- Awarded for: Best Performance by an Actor in a Leading Role
- Country: United States
- Presented by: Florida Film Critics Circle
- First award: Geoffrey Rush; Shine (1996)
- Currently held by: Josh O'Connor; The Mastermind (2025)
- Website: floridafilmcritics.com

The Florida Film Critics Circle Award for Best Actor is an award given by the Florida Film Critics Circle to honor the finest male lead acting achievements in filmmaking.

== Winners ==
- † = Winner of the Academy Award for Best Actor
- ‡ = Winner of the Academy Award for Best Supporting Actor

=== 1990s ===
Year	Winner	Film	Role	Ref.
1996	Geoffrey Rush †	Shine	David Helfgott	
1997	Robert Duvall	The Apostle	Euliss "Sonny" Dewey / The Apostle	
1998	Ian McKellen	Apt Pupil	Kurt Dussander	
1998	Ian McKellen	Gods and Monsters	James Whale	
1999	Kevin Spacey †	American Beauty	Lester Burnham	

=== 2000s ===
Year	Winner	Film	Role	Ref.
2000	Geoffrey Rush	Quills	Marquis de Sade	
2001	Billy Bob Thornton	Bandits	Terry Lee Collins	
2001	Billy Bob Thornton	The Man Who Wasn't There	Ed Crane	
2001	Billy Bob Thornton	Monster's Ball	Hank Grotowski	
2002	Daniel Day-Lewis	Gangs of New York	William "Bill the Butcher" Cutting	
2003	Sean Penn	21 Grams	Paul Rivers	
2003	Sean Penn	Mystic River †	Jimmy Markum	
2004	Jamie Foxx †	Ray	Ray Charles	
2005	Philip Seymour Hoffman †	Capote	Truman Capote	
2006	Forest Whitaker †	The Last King of Scotland	Idi Amin	
2007	Daniel Day-Lewis †	There Will Be Blood	Daniel Plainview	
2008	Mickey Rourke	The Wrestler	Randy Robinson	
2009	George Clooney	Up in the Air	Ryan Bingham	

=== 2010s ===
Year	Winner	Film	Role	Ref.
2010	Colin Firth †	The King's Speech	King George VI	
2011	Michael Fassbender	Shame	Brandon Sullivan	
2012	Daniel Day-Lewis †	Lincoln	Abraham Lincoln	
2013	Chiwetel Ejiofor	12 Years a Slave	Solomon Northup	
2014	Michael Keaton	Birdman	Riggan Thomson	
2015	Paul Dano	Love & Mercy	Brian Wilson	
2016	Casey Affleck †	Manchester by the Sea	Lee Chandler	
2017	Timothée Chalamet	Call Me by Your Name	Elio Perlman	
2018	Joaquin Phoenix	You Were Never Really Here	Joe	
2019	Adam Driver	Marriage Story	Charlie Barber	

=== 2020s ===
Year	Winner	Film	Role	Ref.
2020	Anthony Hopkins †	The Father	Anthony	
2021	Adam Driver	Annette	Henry McHenry	
2022	Colin Farrell	The Banshees of Inisherin	Pádraic Súilleabháin	
2023	Franz Rogowski	Passages	Tomas Freiburg	
2024	Kieran Culkin ‡	A Real Pain	Benji Kaplan	
2025	Josh O'Connor	The Mastermind	James Blaine "J.B." Mooney	

== Multiple wins ==
3 wins

- Daniel Day-Lewis (2002, 2007, 2012)

2 wins

- Adam Driver (2019, 2021)
- Geoffrey Rush (1996, 2000)
