= Gotham Independent Film Awards 2023 =

Annual US film awards ceremony

33rd Annual Gotham Awards
- Date: November 27, 2023
- Location: Cipriani Wall Street, New York
- Country: United States
- Presented by: The Gotham Film & Media Institute

Highlights
- Most wins: Anatomy of a Fall (2)
- Most nominations: All of Us Strangers (4)
- Best Feature: Past Lives
- Breakthrough Director: A. V. Rockwell – A Thousand and One

The 33rd Annual Gotham Awards, presented by the Gotham Film & Media Institute, were held on November 27, 2023. The nominees were announced on October 24, 2023.

The films Air, Barbie, Ferrari, Killers of the Flower Moon, Maestro, and Rustin all received tribute awards.

== Ceremony information ==
This year, the organization has removed the budget cap requirements which they claim will create "a more inclusive submission pool" of potential nominees. In previous years, to be eligible for the Gothams, a film's budget couldn't exceed $35 million. "We're excited to include more voices from around the globe by expanding eligibility for the many brilliant international films and filmmakers who deserve to be in consideration this year," said Jeffrey Sharp, executive director of the Gotham Film & Media Institute. "Additionally, with shifting budgets, we've decided to eliminate arbitrary budget caps for submission eligibility – first instituted over a decade ago – to broaden our reach in terms of recognition and accessibility to the wider community," he concluded.

== Winners and nominees ==
=== Film ===
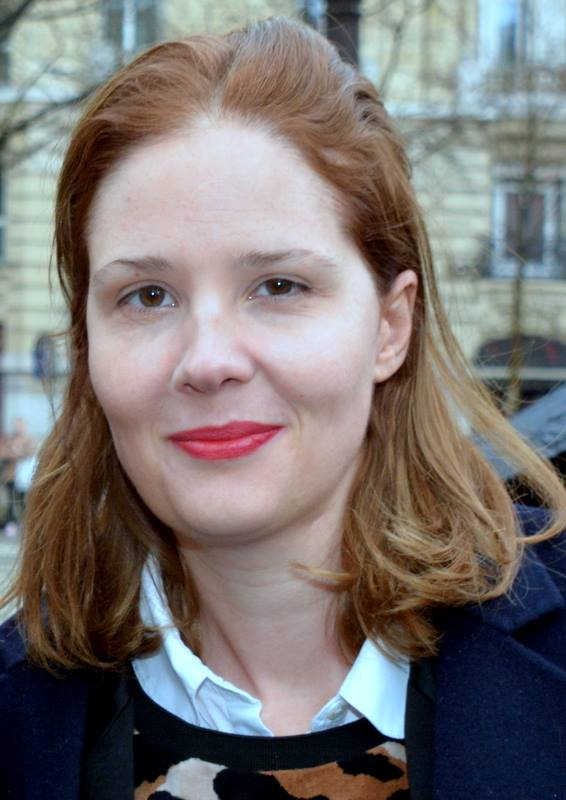
Justine Triet, Best Screenplay co-winner

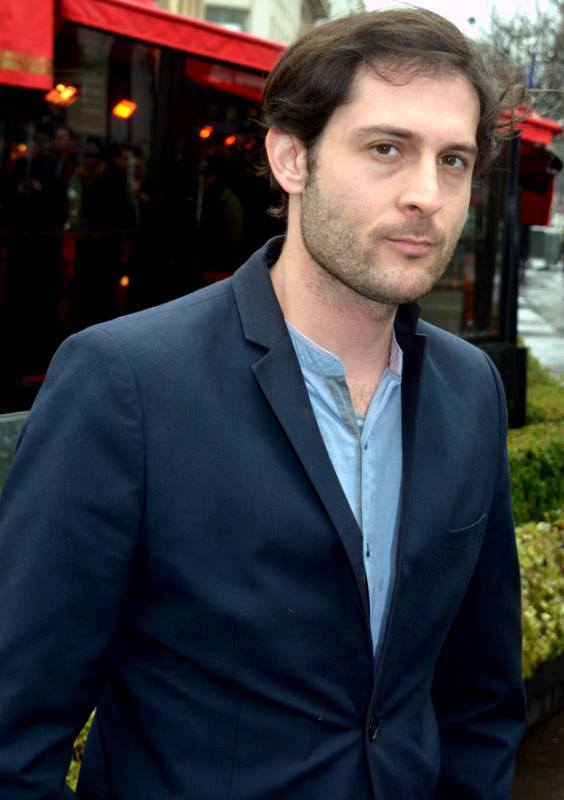
Arthur Harari, Best Screenplay co-winner

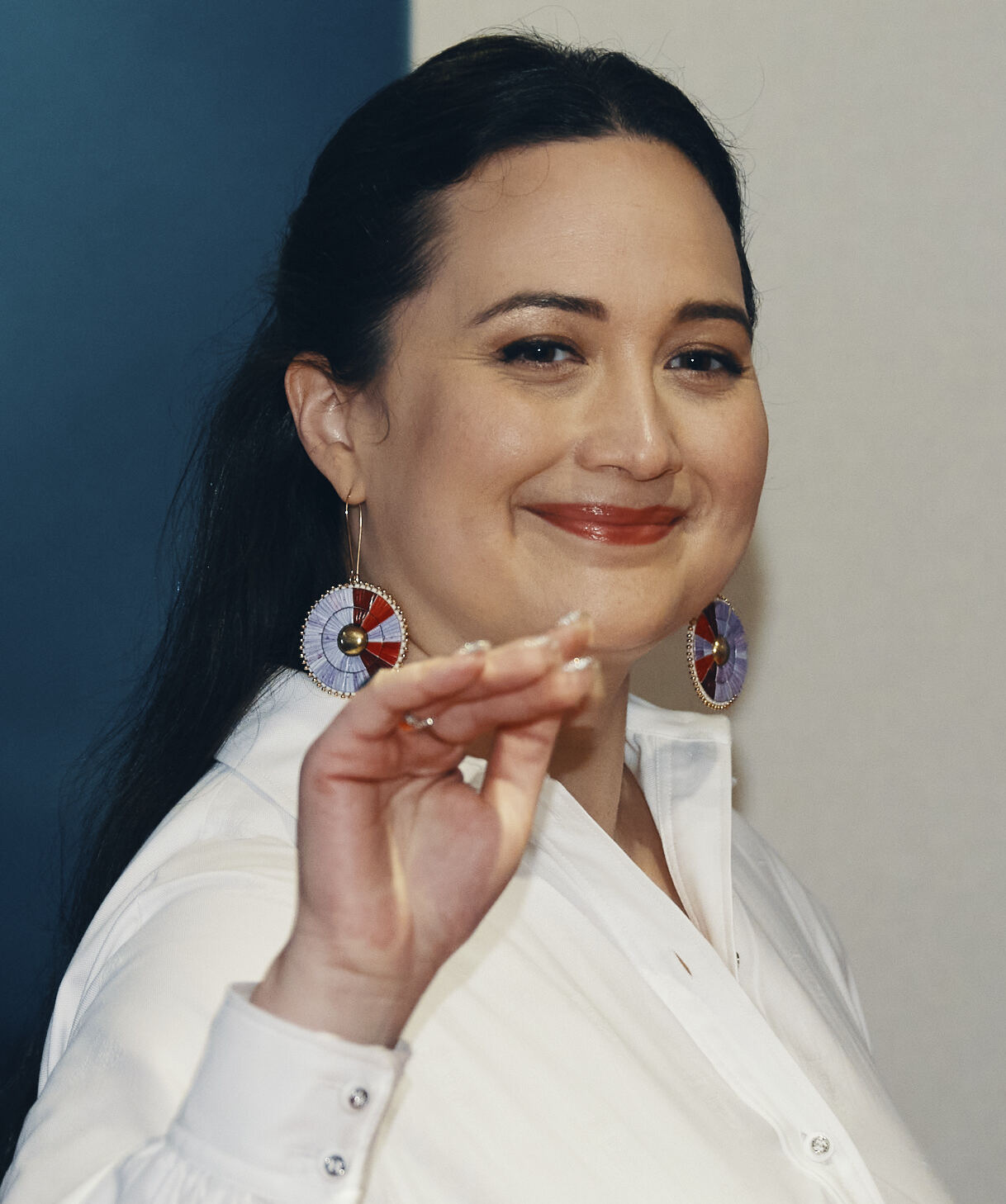
Lily Gladstone, Outstanding Lead Performance winner

Best Feature: Past Lives; Passages; Reality; Showing Up; A Thousand and One	Best Screenplay: Anatomy of a Fall – Justine Triet and Arthur Harari; All of Us Strangers – Andrew Haigh; May December – Samy Burch; story by Samy Burch and Alex Mechanik; R.M.N. – Cristian Mungiu; The Zone of Interest – Jonathan Glazer
Best Documentary Feature: Four Daughters; 20 Days in Mariupol; Against the Tide; Apolonia, Apolonia; Our Body	Best International Feature: Anatomy of a Fall; All of Us Strangers; Poor Things; Tótem; The Zone of Interest
Breakthrough Director: A. V. Rockwell – A Thousand and One; Michelle Garza Cervera – Huesera: The Bone Woman; Raven Jackson – All Dirt Roads Taste of Salt; Georgia Oakley – Blue Jean; Celine Song – Past Lives
Outstanding Lead Performance: Lily Gladstone – The Unknown Country as Tana; Aunjanue Ellis-Taylor – Origin as Isabel Wilkerson; Greta Lee – Past Lives as Nora; Franz Rogowski – Passages as Tomas; Babetida Sadjo – Our Father, the Devil as Marie Cissé; Andrew Scott – All of Us Strangers as Adam; Cailee Spaeny – Priscilla as Priscilla Presley; Teyana Taylor – A Thousand and One as Inez de la Paz; Michelle Williams – Showing Up as Lizzy; Jeffrey Wright – American Fiction as Thelonious "Monk" Ellison	Outstanding Supporting Performance: Charles Melton – May December as Joe Yoo; Juliette Binoche – The Taste of Things as Eugénie; Penélope Cruz – Ferrari as Laura Ferrari; Jamie Foxx – They Cloned Tyrone as Slick Charles; Claire Foy – All of Us Strangers as Mum; Ryan Gosling – Barbie as Ken; Glenn Howerton – BlackBerry as Jim Balsillie; Sandra Hüller – The Zone of Interest as Hedwig Höss; Rachel McAdams – Are You There God? It's Me, Margaret. as Barbara Simon; Da'Vine Joy Randolph – The Holdovers as Mary Lamb

==== Films with multiple wins and nominations ====
Film that received multiple wins
Wins	Film
2	Anatomy of a Fall

Films that received multiple nominations
Nominations	Film
4	All of Us Strangers
3	Past Lives
3	A Thousand and One
3	The Zone of Interest
2	Anatomy of a Fall
2	May December
2	Passages
2	Showing Up

=== Television ===
Breakthrough Series – Over 40 minutes: A Small Light; Anne Rice's Interview with the Vampire; Dead Ringers; The English; The Last of Us; Telemarketers	Breakthrough Series – Under 40 minutes: Beef; High School; I'm a Virgo; Rain Dogs; Swarm
Outstanding Performance in a New Series: Ali Wong – Beef as Amy Lau; Jacob Anderson – Anne Rice's Interview with the Vampire as Louis de Pointe du Lac; Dominique Fishback – Swarm as Andrea "Dre" Greene; Jharrel Jerome – I'm a Virgo as Cootie; Natasha Lyonne – Poker Face as Charlie Cale; Bel Powley – A Small Light as Miep Gies; Bella Ramsey – The Last of Us as Ellie; Chaske Spencer – The English as Sgt. Eli Whipp / Wounded Wolf; Rachel Weisz – Dead Ringers as Beverly and Elliot Mantle; Steven Yeun – Beef as Danny Cho

==== Series with multiple wins and nominations ====
Series that received multiple wins
Wins	Series
2	Beef

Series that received multiple nominations
Nominations	Series
3	Beef
2	Anne Rice's Interview with the Vampire
2	Dead Ringers
2	The English
2	I'm a Virgo
2	The Last of Us
2	A Small Light
2	Swarm

== Special awards ==
=== Cultural Icon & Creator Tribute ===
- Maestro

=== Global Icon & Creator Tribute ===
- Barbie

=== Historical Icon & Creator Tribute ===
- Killers of the Flower Moon

=== Icon & Creator Tribute for Innovation ===
- Ferrari

=== Icon & Creator Tribute for Social Justice ===
- Rustin

=== Visionary Icon & Creator Tribute ===
- Air
