= Black Reel Award for Outstanding Breakthrough Screenwriter =

Award presented annually by the Black Reel Awards

Black Reel Award for Outstanding First Screenplay
- Awarded for: Outstanding First Screenplay
- Country: United States
- Presented by: Black Reel Awards (BRAs)
- First award: Black Reel Awards of 2017
- Most recent winner: Radha Blank; The Forty-Year-Old Version (Black Reel Awards of 2021)
- Website: blackreelawards.com

This article lists the winners and nominees for the Black Reel Award for Outstanding First Screenplay. The award is given to the writers for their first screenplay debut.

== Winners and nominees ==
=== 2010s ===
| Year | Writer | Film | Ref. |
|---|---|---|---|
| 2017 | Steven Caple Jr. | The Land | |
| 2017 | Hermon Hailay | Price of Love | |
| 2017 | Yared Zeleke | Lamb | |
| 2018 | Maggie Betts | Novitiate | |
| 2018 | Gerald McMurray and Christine T. Berg | Burning Sands | |
| 2018 | Malik Vitthal and Ismet Prcic | Sleight | |
| 2018 | J.D. Dillard and Alex Theurer | Lamb | |
| 2018 | Caroline Jules | Tourments d'amour | |
| 2019 | Boots Riley | Sorry to Bother You | |
| 2019 | Daveed Diggs and Rafael Casal | Blindspotting | |
| 2019 | Reinaldo Marcus Green | Monsters and Men | |
| 2019 | Michael Larnell | Roxanne Roxanne | |
| 2019 | Nijla Mumin | Jinn | |

=== 2020s ===
| Year | Writer | Film | Ref. |
|---|---|---|---|
| 2020 | Lena Waithe | Queen & Slim | |
| 2020 | Chiwetel Ejiofor | The Boy Who Harnessed the Wind | |
| 2020 | Phillip Youmans | Burning Cane | |
| 2020 | Chinonye Chukwu | Clemency | |
| 2020 | Mati Diop and Oliver Demangel | Atlantics | |
| 2021 | Radha Blank | The Forty-Year-Old Version | |
| 2021 | Eugene Ashe | Sylvie's Love | |
| 2021 | Kemp Powers | One Night in Miami... | |
| 2021 | Ruben Santiago-Hudson | Ma Rainey's Black Bottom | |
| 2021 | Channing Godfrey Peoples | Miss Juneteenth | |
