= List of accolades received by Killers of the Flower Moon (film) =

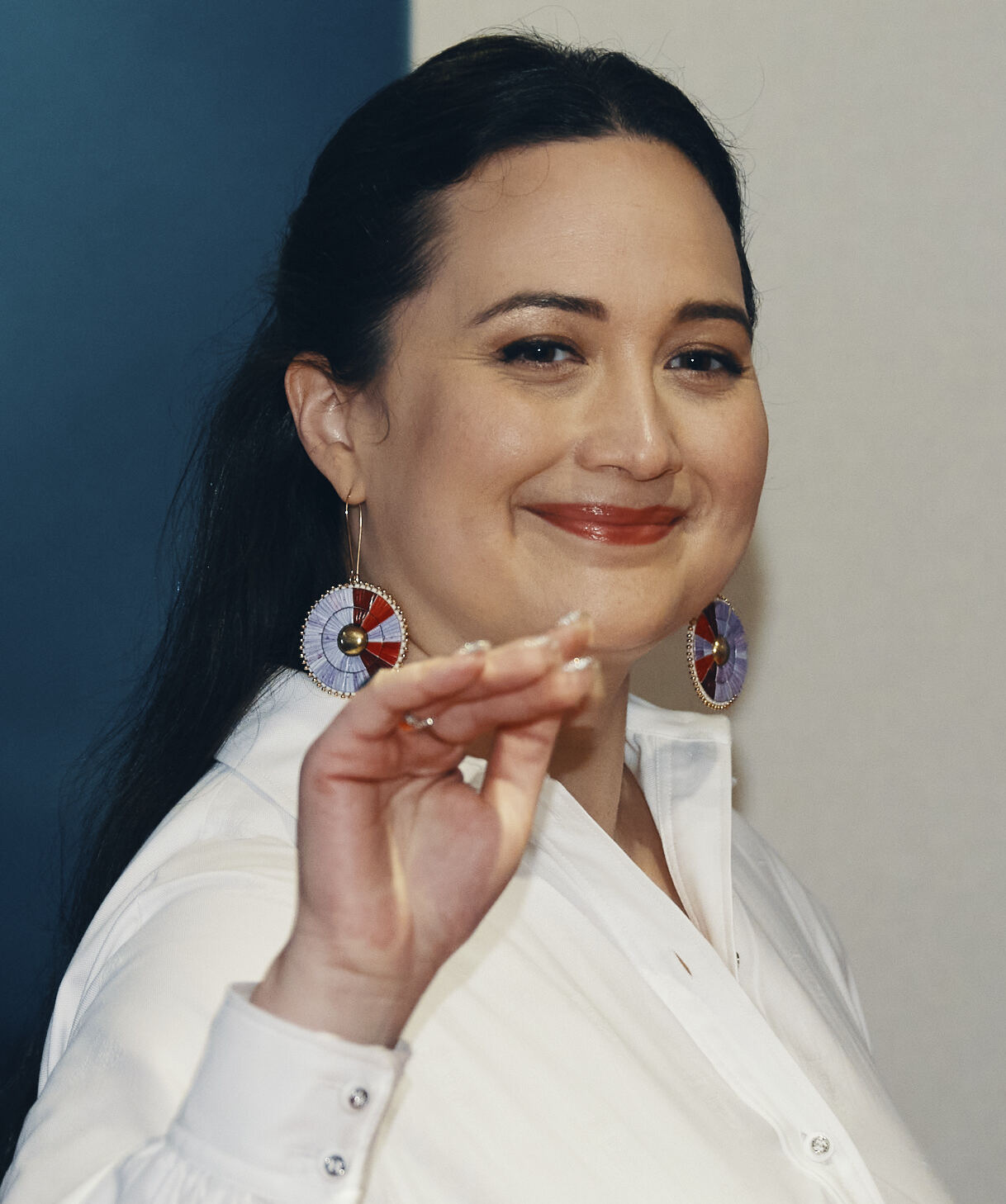
- Lily Gladstone received several awards for her performance in the film.
Accolades
Award	Wins	Nominations
AACTA International Awards	0	5
AARP Movies for Grownups Awards	2	5
Academy Awards	0	10
African-American Film Critics Association	2	2
Alliance of Women Film Journalists	4	9
American Cinema Editors	0	1
American Film Institute Awards	1	1
American Society of Cinematographers	0	1
Art Directors Guild Awards	0	1
Artios Awards	1	1
Astra Film and Creative Arts Awards	1	10
Austin Film Critics Association	3	11
Bodil Awards	0	1
Boston Society of Film Critics	5	5
British Academy Film Awards	0	9
British Society of Cinematographers	0	1
CEC Awards	1	1
Chicago Film Critics Association	3	10
Cinema Audio Society Awards	0	1
Cinema for Peace Awards	0	1
Costume Designers Guild	0	1
Critics' Choice Movie Awards	0	12
Dallas–Fort Worth Film Critics Association Awards	7	7
Dorian Awards	1	1
Directors Guild of America Awards	0	1
Dublin Film Critics' Circle	4	4
Fotogramas de Plata	1	1
Florida Film Critics Circle	4	8
Georgia Film Critics Association	3	7
Golden Globe Awards	1	7
Golden Reel Awards	0	1
Gotham Awards	1	1
Guild of Music Supervisors Awards	1	2
Hollywood Critics Association Midseason Film Awards	0	2
Hollywood Music in Media Awards	1	1
Houston Film Critics Society	1	8
IndieWire Critics Poll	5	5
International Cinephile Society	0	5
Japan Academy Film Prize	0	1
Kansas City Film Critics Circle	5	5
Location Managers Guild International Awards	0	2
London Film Critics' Circle	0	4
Los Angeles Film Critics Association	2	2
National Board of Review	4	4
National Society of Film Critics	2	2
New York Film Critics Circle	2	2
New York Film Critics Online	1	1
International Cinephile Society	0	5
Palm Springs International Film Festival	1	1
Paris Film Critics Association Awards	1	8
People's Choice Awards	0	3
Producers Guild of America Awards	0	1
Robert Awards	0	1
San Diego Film Critics Society	3	8
San Francisco Bay Area Film Critics Circle	0	6
Santa Barbara International Film Festival	2	2
Sant Jordi Awards	2	2
Satellite Awards	1	12
Screen Actors Guild Awards	1	3
Seattle Film Critics Society	2	11
Set Decorators Society of America Awards	0	1
Society of Composers & Lyricists	0	1
St. Louis Film Critics Association	3	12
Toronto Film Critics Association	5	5
USC Scripter Awards	0	1
Vancouver Film Critics Circle	0	2
Visual Effects Society Awards	0	1
Washington D.C. Area Film Critics Association	1	9
Women Film Critics Circle	2	2
World Soundtrack Awards	0	1
Writers Guild of America Awards	0	1

Totals (Note: Certain award groups do not simply award one winner. They acknowledge several different recipients, have runners-up, and have third place. Since this is a specific recognition and is different from losing an award, runner-up mentions are considered wins in this award tally. For simplification and to avoid errors, each award in this list has been presumed to have had a prior nomination.)
- Wins: 93
- Nominations: 282

Killers of the Flower Moon (Note: Osage: 𐓨𐓣͘𐓪͘𐓬𐓘 𐓡𐓧𐓘𐓮𐓤𐓘 𐓻𐓣͘𐓤𐓘 𐓲'𐓟𐓵𐓟, Mihopa hlaska žika c'eðe. The Osage title appears on screen at the end of the film, before the English title.) is a 2023 American epic western crime drama film co-written, produced, and directed by Martin Scorsese. Eric Roth and Scorsese based their screenplay on the 2017 non-fiction book by David Grann. Set in 1920s Oklahoma, it focuses on a series of murders of Osage members and relations in the Osage Nation after oil was discovered on tribal land. The tribal members had retained mineral rights on their reservation, but a corrupt local political boss sought to steal the tribal members' wealth. Leonardo DiCaprio, Robert De Niro and Lily Gladstone lead an ensemble cast, also including Jesse Plemons, Tantoo Cardinal, John Lithgow and Brendan Fraser.

The film received 10 nominations at the 96th Academy Awards, including Best Picture, Best Director, Best Actress, Best Supporting Actor, Best Costume Design, Best Original Song, Best Original Score, Best Production Design, Best Editing, and Best Cinematography. At the 77th British Academy Film Awards, it received nine nominations, including for Best Film. The film earned seven nominations at the 81st Golden Globe Awards, winning one for Best Actress in a Motion Picture (Gladstone). In addition, the National Board of Review named the film the best film of 2023, and the American Film Institute selected it as one of the top ten films of the year.

== Accolades ==
Accolades received by Killers of the Flower Moon (film)
Award	Date of ceremony	Category	Recipients	Result	Ref.
AACTA International Awards	February 10, 2024	Best International Film	Killers of the Flower Moon	Nominated	
AACTA International Awards	February 10, 2024	Best International Direction	Martin Scorsese	Nominated	
AACTA International Awards	February 10, 2024	Best International Actor	Leonardo DiCaprio	Nominated	
AACTA International Awards	February 10, 2024	Best International Actress	Lily Gladstone	Nominated	
AACTA International Awards	February 10, 2024	Best International Supporting Actor	Robert De Niro	Nominated	
AARP Movies for Grownups Awards	January 17, 2024	Best Movie for Grownups	Killers of the Flower Moon	Won	
AARP Movies for Grownups Awards	January 17, 2024	Best Director	Martin Scorsese	Nominated	
AARP Movies for Grownups Awards	January 17, 2024	Best Supporting Actor	Robert De Niro	Won	
AARP Movies for Grownups Awards	January 17, 2024	Best Ensemble	Killers of the Flower Moon	Nominated	
AARP Movies for Grownups Awards	January 17, 2024	Best Screenwriter	Martin Scorsese and Eric Roth	Nominated	
Academy Awards	March 10, 2024	Best Picture	Martin Scorsese, Dan Friedkin, Bradley Thomas, and Daniel Lupi	Nominated	
Academy Awards	March 10, 2024	Best Director	Martin Scorsese	Nominated	
Academy Awards	March 10, 2024	Best Actress	Lily Gladstone	Nominated	
Academy Awards	March 10, 2024	Best Supporting Actor	Robert De Niro	Nominated	
Academy Awards	March 10, 2024	Best Cinematography	Rodrigo Prieto	Nominated	
Academy Awards	March 10, 2024	Best Film Editing	Thelma Schoonmaker	Nominated	
Academy Awards	March 10, 2024	Best Production Design	Jack Fisk and Adam Willis	Nominated	
Academy Awards	March 10, 2024	Best Costume Design	Jacqueline West	Nominated	
Academy Awards	March 10, 2024	Best Original Score	Robbie Robertson	Nominated	
Academy Awards	March 10, 2024	Best Original Song	Scott George (for "Wahzhazhe (A Song for My People)")	Nominated	
African-American Film Critics Association	January 15, 2024	Top 10 Films of the Year	Killers of the Flower Moon	9th place	
African-American Film Critics Association	January 15, 2024	Breakout Performance	Lily Gladstone	Won	
Alliance of Women Film Journalists	January 4, 2024	Best Film	Killers of the Flower Moon	Nominated	
Alliance of Women Film Journalists	January 4, 2024	Best Director	Martin Scorsese	Nominated	
Alliance of Women Film Journalists	January 4, 2024	Best Actress	Lily Gladstone	Won	
Alliance of Women Film Journalists	January 4, 2024	Best Woman's Breakthrough Performance	Lily Gladstone	Won	
Alliance of Women Film Journalists	January 4, 2024	Best Screenplay, Adapted	Eric Roth and Martin Scorsese	Nominated	
Alliance of Women Film Journalists	January 4, 2024	Best Ensemble Cast – Casting Director	Ellen Lewis	Nominated	
Alliance of Women Film Journalists	January 4, 2024	Best Cinematography	Rodrigo Prieto	Won	
Alliance of Women Film Journalists	January 4, 2024	Best Editing	Thelma Schoonmaker	Won	
Alliance of Women Film Journalists	January 4, 2024	Most Egregious Lovers' Age Difference Award (Special Mention)	Leonardo DiCaprio and Lily Gladstone	Nominated	
American Cinema Editors	March 3, 2024	Best Edited Feature Film (Drama, Theatrical)	Thelma Schoonmaker	Nominated	
American Film Institute Awards	December 7, 2023	Top 10 Films of the Year	Killers of the Flower Moon	Won (Note: This award does not have a single winner, but recognizes multiple films.)	
American Society of Cinematographers	March 3, 2024	Outstanding Achievement in Cinematography in Theatrical Releases	Rodrigo Prieto	Nominated	
Art Directors Guild Awards	February 10, 2024	Excellence in Production Design for a Period Film	Jack Fisk	Nominated	
Artios Awards	March 7, 2024	Outstanding Achievement in Casting – Big Budget Feature (Drama)	Ellen Lewis, Rene Haynes, and Kate Sprance	Won	
Astra Film and Creative Arts Awards	January 6, 2024	Best Picture	Killers of the Flower Moon	Nominated	
Astra Film and Creative Arts Awards	January 6, 2024	Best Director	Martin Scorsese	Nominated	
Astra Film and Creative Arts Awards	January 6, 2024	Best Actress	Lily Gladstone	Won (Note: Tied with Margot Robbie for Barbie.)	
Astra Film and Creative Arts Awards	January 6, 2024	Best Adapted Screenplay	Eric Roth and Martin Scorsese	Nominated	
Astra Film and Creative Arts Awards	January 6, 2024	Best Cast Ensemble	Killers of the Flower Moon	Nominated	
Astra Film and Creative Arts Awards	February 26, 2024	Best Cinematography	Rodrigo Prieto	Nominated	
Astra Film and Creative Arts Awards	February 26, 2024	Best Costume Design	Jacqueline West	Nominated	
Astra Film and Creative Arts Awards	February 26, 2024	Best Editing	Thelma Schoonmaker	Nominated	
Astra Film and Creative Arts Awards	February 26, 2024	Best Production Design	Jack Fisk and Adam Willis	Nominated	
Astra Film and Creative Arts Awards	February 26, 2024	Best Score	Robbie Robertson	Nominated	
Austin Film Critics Association	January 10, 2024	Best Film	Killers of the Flower Moon	Won	
Austin Film Critics Association	January 10, 2024	Best Director	Martin Scorsese	Nominated	
Austin Film Critics Association	January 10, 2024	Best Actor	Leonardo DiCaprio	Nominated	
Austin Film Critics Association	January 10, 2024	Best Actress	Lily Gladstone	Won	
Austin Film Critics Association	January 10, 2024	The Robert R. "Bobby" McCurdy Memorial Breakthrough Artist Award	Lily Gladstone	Won (Note: Also for The Unknown Country, Fancy Dance and Quantum Cowboys.)	
Austin Film Critics Association	January 10, 2024	Best Supporting Actor	Robert De Niro	Nominated	
Austin Film Critics Association	January 10, 2024	Best Adapted Screenplay	Eric Roth and Martin Scorsese	Nominated	
Austin Film Critics Association	January 10, 2024	Best Cinematography	Rodrigo Prieto	Nominated	
Austin Film Critics Association	January 10, 2024	Best Editing	Thelma Schoonmaker	Nominated	
Austin Film Critics Association	January 10, 2024	Best Original Score	Robbie Robertson	Nominated	
Austin Film Critics Association	January 10, 2024	Best Ensemble	Killers of the Flower Moon	Nominated	
Bodil Awards	March 16, 2024	Best English Language Film	Killers of the Flower Moon	Nominated	
Boston Society of Film Critics	December 10, 2023	Best Actress	Lily Gladstone	Won	
Boston Society of Film Critics	December 10, 2023	Best Adapted Screenplay	Eric Roth and Martin Scorsese	Runner-up (Note: Shared with Kelly Fremon Craig for Are You There God? It's Me, Margaret..)	
Boston Society of Film Critics	December 10, 2023	Best Editing	Thelma Schoonmaker	Won	
Boston Society of Film Critics	December 10, 2023	Best Original Score	Robbie Robertson	Won	
Boston Society of Film Critics	December 10, 2023	Best Ensemble Cast	Killers of the Flower Moon	Runner-up (Note: Shared with Asteroid City and The Iron Claw.)	
British Academy Film Awards	February 18, 2024	Best Film	Killers of the Flower Moon	Nominated	
British Academy Film Awards	February 18, 2024	Best Supporting Actor	Robert De Niro	Nominated	
British Academy Film Awards	February 18, 2024	Best Casting	Ellen Lewis and Rene Haynes	Nominated	
British Academy Film Awards	February 18, 2024	Best Cinematography	Rodrigo Prieto	Nominated	
British Academy Film Awards	February 18, 2024	Best Costume Design	Jacqueline West	Nominated	
British Academy Film Awards	February 18, 2024	Best Editing	Thelma Schoonmaker	Nominated	
British Academy Film Awards	February 18, 2024	Best Makeup and Hair	Kay Georgiou and Thomas Nellen	Nominated	
British Academy Film Awards	February 18, 2024	Best Original Score	Robbie Robertson	Nominated	
British Academy Film Awards	February 18, 2024	Best Production Design	Jack Fisk and Adam Willis	Nominated	
British Society of Cinematographers	February 3, 2024	Best Cinematography in a Theatrical Feature Film	Rodrigo Prieto	Nominated	
CEC Awards	February 5, 2024	Best Foreign Film	Killers of the Flower Moon	Won	
Chicago Film Critics Association	December 12, 2023	Best Film	Killers of the Flower Moon	Won	
Chicago Film Critics Association	December 12, 2023	Best Director	Martin Scorsese	Nominated	
Chicago Film Critics Association	December 12, 2023	Best Actor	Leonardo DiCaprio	Nominated	
Chicago Film Critics Association	December 12, 2023	Best Actress	Lily Gladstone	Nominated	
Chicago Film Critics Association	December 12, 2023	Best Adapted Screenplay	Eric Roth and Martin Scorsese	Won	
Chicago Film Critics Association	December 12, 2023	Best Art Direction / Production Design	Jack Fisk and Adam Willis	Nominated	
Chicago Film Critics Association	December 12, 2023	Best Cinematography	Rodrigo Prieto	Nominated	
Chicago Film Critics Association	December 12, 2023	Best Costume Design	Jacqueline West	Nominated	
Chicago Film Critics Association	December 12, 2023	Best Editing	Thelma Schoonmaker	Nominated	
Chicago Film Critics Association	December 12, 2023	Best Original Score	Robbie Robertson	Won	
Cinema Audio Society Awards	March 2, 2024	Outstanding Achievement in Sound Mixing for Motion Picture – Live Action	Mark Ulano, Tom Fleischman, Eugene Gearty, Mark DeSimone, and George A. Lara	Nominated	
Cinema for Peace Awards	February 18–19, 2024	Cinema for Peace Dove for The Most Valuable Film of the Year 2024	Killers of the Flower Moon	Nominated	
Costume Designers Guild	February 21, 2024	Excellence in Period Film	Jacqueline West	Nominated	
Critics' Choice Movie Awards	January 14, 2024	Best Picture	Killers of the Flower Moon	Nominated	
Critics' Choice Movie Awards	January 14, 2024	Best Director	Martin Scorsese	Nominated	
Critics' Choice Movie Awards	January 14, 2024	Best Actor	Leonardo DiCaprio	Nominated	
Critics' Choice Movie Awards	January 14, 2024	Best Actress	Lily Gladstone	Nominated	
Critics' Choice Movie Awards	January 14, 2024	Best Supporting Actor	Robert De Niro	Nominated	
Critics' Choice Movie Awards	January 14, 2024	Best Acting Ensemble	The cast of Killers of the Flower Moon	Nominated	
Critics' Choice Movie Awards	January 14, 2024	Best Adapted Screenplay	Eric Roth and Martin Scorsese	Nominated	
Critics' Choice Movie Awards	January 14, 2024	Best Cinematography	Rodrigo Prieto	Nominated	
Critics' Choice Movie Awards	January 14, 2024	Best Editing	Thelma Schoonmaker	Nominated	
Critics' Choice Movie Awards	January 14, 2024	Best Costume Design	Jacqueline West	Nominated	
Critics' Choice Movie Awards	January 14, 2024	Best Production Design	Jack Fisk and Adam Willis	Nominated	
Critics' Choice Movie Awards	January 14, 2024	Best Score	Robbie Robertson	Nominated	
Dallas–Fort Worth Film Critics Association	December 18, 2023	Best Film	Killers of the Flower Moon	3rd place	
Dallas–Fort Worth Film Critics Association	December 18, 2023	Best Director	Martin Scorsese	2nd place	
Dallas–Fort Worth Film Critics Association	December 18, 2023	Best Actor	Leonardo DiCaprio	5th place (Note: Tied with Colman Domingo for Rustin.)	
Dallas–Fort Worth Film Critics Association	December 18, 2023	Best Actress	Lily Gladstone	Won	
Dallas–Fort Worth Film Critics Association	December 18, 2023	Best Supporting Actor	Robert De Niro	3rd place	
Dallas–Fort Worth Film Critics Association	December 18, 2023	Best Cinematography	Rodrigo Prieto	2nd place	
Dallas–Fort Worth Film Critics Association	December 18, 2023	Best Musical Score	Robbie Robertson	Won	
Directors Guild of America Awards	February 10, 2024	Outstanding Directorial Achievement in Motion Pictures	Martin Scorsese	Nominated	
Dorian Awards	February 26, 2024	Film Performance of the Year	Lily Gladstone	Won	
Dublin Film Critics Circle	December 19, 2023	Best Film	Killers of the Flower Moon	4th place	
Dublin Film Critics Circle	December 19, 2023	Best Director	Martin Scorsese	4th place	
Dublin Film Critics Circle	December 19, 2023	Best Actress	Lily Gladstone	Won	
Dublin Film Critics Circle	December 19, 2023	Best Cinematography	Rodrigo Prieto	Won	
Florida Film Critics Circle	December 21, 2023	Best Picture	Killers of the Flower Moon	Nominated	
Florida Film Critics Circle	December 21, 2023	Best Actress	Lily Gladstone	Won	
Florida Film Critics Circle	December 21, 2023	Breakout Award	Lily Gladstone	Won	
Florida Film Critics Circle	December 21, 2023	Best Adapted Screenplay	Eric Roth and Martin Scorsese	Runner-up	
Florida Film Critics Circle	December 21, 2023	Best Ensemble	Killers of the Flower Moon	Won	
Florida Film Critics Circle	December 21, 2023	Best Art Direction / Production Design	Killers of the Flower Moon	Nominated	
Florida Film Critics Circle	December 21, 2023	Best Cinematography	Rodrigo Prieto	Nominated	
Florida Film Critics Circle	December 21, 2023	Best Score	Robbie Robertson	Nominated	
Fotogramas de Plata	February 26, 2024	Best Foreign Film	Killers of the Flower Moon	Won	
Georgia Film Critics Association	January 5, 2024	Best Picture	Killers of the Flower Moon	Nominated	
Georgia Film Critics Association	January 5, 2024	Best Director	Martin Scorsese	Runner-up	
Georgia Film Critics Association	January 5, 2024	Best Actress	Lily Gladstone	Won	
Georgia Film Critics Association	January 5, 2024	Best Adapted Screenplay	Eric Roth and Martin Scorsese	Nominated	
Georgia Film Critics Association	January 5, 2024	Best Cinematography	Rodrigo Prieto	Runner-up	
Georgia Film Critics Association	January 5, 2024	Best Production Design	Jack Fisk and Adam Willis	Nominated	
Georgia Film Critics Association	January 5, 2024	Best Ensemble	Killers of the Flower Moon	Nominated	
Golden Globe Awards	January 7, 2024	Best Motion Picture – Drama	Killers of the Flower Moon	Nominated	
Golden Globe Awards	January 7, 2024	Best Director	Martin Scorsese	Nominated	
Golden Globe Awards	January 7, 2024	Best Actor – Motion Picture Drama	Leonardo DiCaprio	Nominated	
Golden Globe Awards	January 7, 2024	Best Actress – Motion Picture Drama	Lily Gladstone	Won	
Golden Globe Awards	January 7, 2024	Best Supporting Actor – Motion Picture	Robert De Niro	Nominated	
Golden Globe Awards	January 7, 2024	Best Screenplay	Eric Roth and Martin Scorsese	Nominated	
Golden Globe Awards	January 7, 2024	Best Original Score	Robbie Robertson	Nominated	
Golden Reel Awards	March 3, 2024	Outstanding Achievement in Sound Editing – Feature Dialogue / ADR	Philip Stockton, Eugene Gearty, Julia Stockton, and Marissa Littlefield	Nominated	
Gotham Awards	November 27, 2023	Historical Icon & Creator Tribute	Killers of the Flower Moon	Won	
Guild of Music Supervisors Awards	March 3, 2024	Best Music Supervision in a Trailer – Film	Deric Berberabe and Jordan Silverberg (for "Official Trailer 2")	Nominated	
Guild of Music Supervisors Awards	March 3, 2024	Best Music Supervision in a Trailer – Film	Angel Mendoza (for "Official Teaser Trailer")	Won	
Hollywood Critics Association Midseason Film Awards	July 1, 2022	Most Anticipated Film	Killers of the Flower Moon	Nominated	
Hollywood Critics Association Midseason Film Awards	June 30, 2023	Most Anticipated Film	Killers of the Flower Moon	Nominated	
Hollywood Music in Media Awards	November 15, 2023	Best Original Score – Feature Film	Robbie Robertson	Won	
Houston Film Critics Society	January 22, 2024	Best Picture	Killers of the Flower Moon	Nominated	
Houston Film Critics Society	January 22, 2024	Best Director	Martin Scorsese	Nominated	
Houston Film Critics Society	January 22, 2024	Best Actor	Leonardo DiCaprio	Nominated	
Houston Film Critics Society	January 22, 2024	Best Actress	Lily Gladstone	Nominated	
Houston Film Critics Society	January 22, 2024	Best Supporting Actor	Robert De Niro	Nominated	
Houston Film Critics Society	January 22, 2024	Best Original Score	Robbie Robertson	Won	
Houston Film Critics Society	January 22, 2024	Best Cinematography	Rodrigo Prieto	Nominated	
Houston Film Critics Society	January 22, 2024	Best Ensemble Cast	Killers of the Flower Moon	Nominated	
IndieWire Critics Poll	December 11, 2023	Best Film	Killers of the Flower Moon	1st place	
IndieWire Critics Poll	December 11, 2023	Best Director	Martin Scorsese	1st place	
IndieWire Critics Poll	December 11, 2023	Best Performance	Lily Gladstone	2nd place	
IndieWire Critics Poll	December 11, 2023	Best Screenplay	Martin Scorsese and Eric Roth	6th place	
IndieWire Critics Poll	December 11, 2023	Best Cinematography	Rodrigo Prieto	3rd place	
International Cinephile Society	February 11, 2024	Best Picture	Killers of the Flower Moon	Nominated	
International Cinephile Society	February 11, 2024	Best Actress	Lily Gladstone	Nominated	
International Cinephile Society	February 11, 2024	Best Adapted Screenplay	Eric Roth and Martin Scorsese	Nominated	
International Cinephile Society	February 11, 2024	Best Production Design	Jack Fisk and Adam Willis	Nominated	
International Cinephile Society	February 11, 2024	Best Score	Robbie Robertson	Nominated	
Japan Academy Film Prize	March 8, 2024	Outstanding Foreign Language Film	Killers of the Flower Moon	Nominated	
Kansas City Film Critics Circle	January 27, 2024	Best Film	Killers of the Flower Moon	Runner-up	
Kansas City Film Critics Circle	January 27, 2024	Best Actress	Lily Gladstone	Won	
Kansas City Film Critics Circle	January 27, 2024	Best Adapted Screenplay	Martin Scorsese and Eric Roth	Runner-up	
Kansas City Film Critics Circle	January 27, 2024	Best Cinematography	Rodrigo Prieto	Runner-up	
Kansas City Film Critics Circle	January 27, 2024	Best Original Score	Robbie Robertson	Runner-up	
Location Managers Guild International Awards	August 24, 2024	Outstanding Locations in a Period Feature Film	Mike Fantasia, Andrea Keener, Ted Alvarez, Kirsten Cornay, and Miranda Carnessale	Nominated	
Location Managers Guild International Awards	August 24, 2024	Outstanding Film Commission	Oklahoma Film + Music Office and Tulsa Office of Film	Nominated	
London Film Critics' Circle	February 4, 2024	Film of the Year	Killers of the Flower Moon	Nominated	
London Film Critics' Circle	February 4, 2024	Director of the Year	Martin Scorsese	Nominated	
London Film Critics' Circle	February 4, 2024	Actress of the Year	Lily Gladstone	Nominated	
London Film Critics' Circle	February 4, 2024	Technical Achievement Award	Thelma Schoonmaker	Nominated	
Los Angeles Film Critics Association	December 10, 2023	Best Supporting Performance	Lily Gladstone	Runner-up	
Los Angeles Film Critics Association	December 10, 2023	Best Cinematography	Rodrigo Prieto	Runner-up (Note: Also for Barbie.)	
National Board of Review	December 6, 2023	Best Film	Killers of the Flower Moon	Won	
National Board of Review	December 6, 2023	Best Director	Martin Scorsese	Won	
National Board of Review	December 6, 2023	Best Actress	Lily Gladstone	Won	
National Board of Review	December 6, 2023	Outstanding Achievement in Cinematography	Rodrigo Prieto	Won	
National Society of Film Critics	January 6, 2024	Best Actress	Lily Gladstone	Runner-up (Note: Tied with Emma Stone for Poor Things.)	
National Society of Film Critics	January 6, 2024	Best Cinematography	Rodrigo Prieto	Won	
New York Film Critics Circle	November 30, 2023	Best Film	Killers of the Flower Moon	Won	
New York Film Critics Circle	November 30, 2023	Best Actress	Lily Gladstone	Won	
New York Film Critics Online	December 15, 2023	Best Film	Killers of the Flower Moon	Won	
Online Film Critics Society	January 22, 2024	Best Picture	Killers of the Flower Moon	Nominated	
Online Film Critics Society	January 22, 2024	Best Director	Martin Scorsese	Nominated	
Online Film Critics Society	January 22, 2024	Best Actor	Leonardo DiCaprio	Nominated	
Online Film Critics Society	January 22, 2024	Best Actress	Lily Gladstone	Won	
Online Film Critics Society	January 22, 2024	Best Supporting Actor	Robert De Niro	Nominated	
Online Film Critics Society	January 22, 2024	Best Adapted Screenplay	Eric Roth and Martin Scorsese	Nominated	
Online Film Critics Society	January 22, 2024	Best Editing	Thelma Schoonmaker	Nominated	
Online Film Critics Society	January 22, 2024	Best Costume Design	Killers of the Flower Moon	Nominated	
Online Film Critics Society	January 22, 2024	Best Production Design	Killers of the Flower Moon	Nominated	
Online Film Critics Society	January 22, 2024	Best Original Score	Robbie Robertson	Nominated	
Palm Springs International Film Festival	January 4, 2024	Vanguard Award	Martin Scorsese, Leonardo DiCaprio, and Lily Gladstone	Won	
Paris Film Critics Association Awards	February 4, 2024	Best Adapted Screenplay	Eric Roth and Martin Scorsese	Won	
Paris Film Critics Association Awards	February 4, 2024	Best Film	Martin Scorsese	Nominated	
Paris Film Critics Association Awards	February 4, 2024	Best Actress	Lily Gladstone	Nominated	
Paris Film Critics Association Awards	February 4, 2024	Best Supporting Actor	Robert De Niro	Nominated	
Paris Film Critics Association Awards	February 4, 2024	Best Cinematography	Rodrigo Prieto	Nominated	
Paris Film Critics Association Awards	February 4, 2024	Best Editing	Thelma Schoonmaker	Nominated	
Paris Film Critics Association Awards	February 4, 2024	Best Production Design	Jack Fisk	Nominated	
Paris Film Critics Association Awards	February 4, 2024	Best Costume Design	Jacqueline West	Nominated	
People's Choice Awards	February 18, 2024	The Drama Movie of the Year	Killers of the Flower Moon	Nominated	
People's Choice Awards	February 18, 2024	The Male Movie Star of the Year	Leonardo DiCaprio	Nominated	
People's Choice Awards	February 18, 2024	The Drama Movie Star of the Year	Leonardo DiCaprio	Nominated	
Producers Guild of America Awards	February 25, 2024	Outstanding Producer of Theatrical Motion Pictures	Killers of the Flower Moon	Nominated	
Robert Awards	February 3, 2024	Best English Language Film	Killers of the Flower Moon	Nominated	
San Diego Film Critics Society	December 19, 2023	Best Picture	Killers of the Flower Moon	Nominated	
San Diego Film Critics Society	December 19, 2023	Best Director	Martin Scorsese	Won	
San Diego Film Critics Society	December 19, 2023	Best Actress	Lily Gladstone	Won	
San Diego Film Critics Society	December 19, 2023	Best Adapted Screenplay	Eric Roth and Martin Scorsese	Nominated	
San Diego Film Critics Society	December 19, 2023	Best Cinematography	Rodrigo Prieto	Won	
San Diego Film Critics Society	December 19, 2023	Best Editing	Thelma Schoonmaker	Nominated	
San Diego Film Critics Society	December 19, 2023	Best Costume Design	Jacqueline West	Nominated	
San Diego Film Critics Society	December 19, 2023	Best Production Design	Jack Fisk	Nominated	
San Francisco Bay Area Film Critics Circle	January 9, 2024	Best Film	Killers of the Flower Moon	Nominated	
San Francisco Bay Area Film Critics Circle	January 9, 2024	Best Director	Martin Scorsese	Nominated	
San Francisco Bay Area Film Critics Circle	January 9, 2024	Best Actress	Lily Gladstone	Nominated	
San Francisco Bay Area Film Critics Circle	January 9, 2024	Best Cinematography	Rodrigo Prieto	Nominated	
San Francisco Bay Area Film Critics Circle	January 9, 2024	Best Film Editing	Thelma Schoonmaker	Nominated	
San Francisco Bay Area Film Critics Circle	January 9, 2024	Best Original Score	Robbie Robertson	Won	
San Francisco Bay Area Film Critics Circle	January 9, 2024	Best Production Design	Jack Fisk	Nominated	
Santa Barbara International Film Festival	February 10, 2024	Virtuoso Award	Lily Gladstone	Won	
Santa Barbara International Film Festival	February 10, 2024	Variety Artisans Award Cinematography	Rodrigo Prieto	Won	
Sant Jordi Awards	April 24, 2024	Best Foreign Film	Killers of the Flower Moon	Won	
Sant Jordi Awards	April 24, 2024	Best Foreign Actress	Lily Gladstone	Won	
Satellite Awards	March 3, 2024	Best Motion Picture – Drama	Killers of the Flower Moon	Nominated	
Satellite Awards	March 3, 2024	Best Director	Martin Scorsese	Nominated	
Satellite Awards	March 3, 2024	Best Actor in a Motion Picture – Drama	Leonardo DiCaprio	Nominated	
Satellite Awards	March 3, 2024	Best Actress in a Motion Picture – Drama	Lily Gladstone	Won	
Satellite Awards	March 3, 2024	Best Actor in a Supporting Role	Robert De Niro	Nominated	
Satellite Awards	March 3, 2024	Best Adapted Screenplay	Eric Roth and Martin Scorsese	Nominated	
Satellite Awards	March 3, 2024	Best Cinematography	Rodrigo Prieto	Nominated	
Satellite Awards	March 3, 2024	Best Film Editing	Thelma Schoonmaker	Nominated	
Satellite Awards	March 3, 2024	Best Costume Design	Jacqueline West	Nominated	
Satellite Awards	March 3, 2024	Best Production Design	Jack Fisk and Adam Willis	Nominated	
Satellite Awards	March 3, 2024	Best Original Score	Robbie Robertson	Nominated	
Satellite Awards	March 3, 2024	Best Sound (Editing and Mixing)	Killers of the Flower Moon	Nominated	
Screen Actors Guild Awards	February 24, 2024	Outstanding Performance by a Cast in a Motion Picture	Tantoo Cardinal, Robert De Niro, Leonardo DiCaprio, Brendan Fraser, Lily Gladstone, John Lithgow, and Jesse Plemons	Nominated	
Screen Actors Guild Awards	February 24, 2024	Outstanding Performance by a Female Actor in a Leading Role	Lily Gladstone	Won	
Screen Actors Guild Awards	February 24, 2024	Outstanding Performance by a Male Actor in a Supporting Role	Robert De Niro	Nominated	
Seattle Film Critics Society	January 8, 2024	Best Picture of the Year	Killers of the Flower Moon	Nominated	
Seattle Film Critics Society	January 8, 2024	Best Director	Martin Scorsese	Won	
Seattle Film Critics Society	January 8, 2024	Best Actress in a Leading Role	Lily Gladstone	Won	
Seattle Film Critics Society	January 8, 2024	Best Actor in a Supporting Role	Robert De Niro	Nominated	
Seattle Film Critics Society	January 8, 2024	Best Ensemble Cast	Killers of the Flower Moon	Nominated	
Seattle Film Critics Society	January 8, 2024	Best Cinematography	Rodrigo Prieto	Nominated	
Seattle Film Critics Society	January 8, 2024	Best Costume Design	Jacqueline West	Nominated	
Seattle Film Critics Society	January 8, 2024	Best Film Editing	Thelma Schoonmaker	Nominated	
Seattle Film Critics Society	January 8, 2024	Best Original Score	Robbie Robertson	Nominated	
Seattle Film Critics Society	January 8, 2024	Best Production Design	Jack Fisk	Nominated	
Seattle Film Critics Society	January 8, 2024	Villain of the Year	William King Hale (Robert De Niro)	Nominated	
Set Decorators Society of America Awards	February 13, 2024	Best Achievement in Décor/Design of a Period Feature Film	Jack Fisk and Adam Willis	Nominated	
Society of Composers & Lyricists	February 13, 2024	Outstanding Original Score for a Studio Film	Robbie Robertson	Nominated	
St. Louis Film Critics Association	December 17, 2023	Best Film	Killers of the Flower Moon	Nominated	
St. Louis Film Critics Association	December 17, 2023	Best Director	Martin Scorsese	Nominated	
St. Louis Film Critics Association	December 17, 2023	Best Actor	Leonardo DiCaprio	Nominated	
St. Louis Film Critics Association	December 17, 2023	Best Actress	Lily Gladstone	Won	
St. Louis Film Critics Association	December 17, 2023	Best Adapted Screenplay	Eric Roth and Martin Scorsese	Nominated	
St. Louis Film Critics Association	December 17, 2023	Best Ensemble	Killers of the Flower Moon	Nominated	
St. Louis Film Critics Association	December 17, 2023	Best Cinematography	Rodrigo Prieto	Runner-up	
St. Louis Film Critics Association	December 17, 2023	Best Editing	Thelma Schoonmaker	Nominated	
St. Louis Film Critics Association	December 17, 2023	Best Costume Design	Jacqueline West and Julie O'Keefe	Nominated	
St. Louis Film Critics Association	December 17, 2023	Best Production Design	Jack Fisk	Nominated	
St. Louis Film Critics Association	December 17, 2023	Best Score	Robbie Robertson	Runner-up	
St. Louis Film Critics Association	December 17, 2023	Best Scene	Killers of the Flower Moon (for "Radio show finale")	Nominated	
Toronto Film Critics Association	December 17, 2023	Best Picture	Killers of the Flower Moon	Runner-up (Note: Shared with All of Us Strangers.)	
Toronto Film Critics Association	December 17, 2023	Best Director	Martin Scorsese	Runner-up (Note: Shared with Justine Triet for Anatomy of a Fall.)	
Toronto Film Critics Association	December 17, 2023	Outstanding Lead Performance	Lily Gladstone	Won	
Toronto Film Critics Association	December 17, 2023	Outstanding Supporting Performance	Robert De Niro	Runner-up (Note: Shared with Robert Downey Jr. for Oppenheimer, Glenn Howerton for BlackBerry, and Charles Melton for May December.)	
Toronto Film Critics Association	December 17, 2023	Best Adapted Screenplay	Eric Roth and Martin Scorsese	Won	
USC Scripter Awards	March 2, 2024	Best Adapted Screenplay – Film	Eric Roth and Martin Scorsese	Nominated	
Vancouver Film Critics Circle	February 12, 2024	Best Director	Martin Scorsese	Nominated	
Vancouver Film Critics Circle	February 12, 2024	Best Supporting Male Actor	Robert De Niro	Nominated	
Visual Effects Society Awards	February 21, 2024	Outstanding Supporting Visual Effects in a Photoreal Feature	Pablo Helman, Brian Barlettani, Sam Bassett, and Brandon Keys McLaughlin	Nominated	
Washington D.C. Area Film Critics Association	December 10, 2023	Best Feature	Killers of the Flower Moon	Nominated	
Washington D.C. Area Film Critics Association	December 10, 2023	Best Director	Martin Scorsese	Nominated	
Washington D.C. Area Film Critics Association	December 10, 2023	Best Actress	Lily Gladstone	Won	
Washington D.C. Area Film Critics Association	December 10, 2023	Best Adapted Screenplay	Eric Roth and Martin Scorsese	Nominated	
Washington D.C. Area Film Critics Association	December 10, 2023	Best Art Direction	Jack Fisk and Adam Willis	Nominated	
Washington D.C. Area Film Critics Association	December 10, 2023	Best Cinematography	Rodrigo Prieto	Nominated	
Washington D.C. Area Film Critics Association	December 10, 2023	Best Editing	Thelma Schoonmaker	Nominated	
Washington D.C. Area Film Critics Association	December 10, 2023	Best Original Score	Robbie Robertson	Nominated	
Washington D.C. Area Film Critics Association	December 10, 2023	Best Ensemble	Killers of the Flower Moon	Nominated	
Women Film Critics Circle	December 18, 2023	Josephine Baker Award	Killers of the Flower Moon	Won	
Women Film Critics Circle	December 18, 2023	Karen Morley Award	Killers of the Flower Moon	Won	
World Soundtrack Awards	October 16, 2024	Best Original Song	Scott George and Osage Tribal Singers (for "Wahzhazhe (A Song for My People)")	Nominated	
Writers Guild of America Awards	April 14, 2024	Best Adapted Screenplay	Eric Roth and Martin Scorsese	Nominated	
