= Toronto Film Critics Association Awards 2024 =

Annual Canadian film awards ceremony

28th Toronto Film Critics Association
- Date: February 24, 2025
- Site: The Omni King Edward Hotel, Toronto
- Hosted by: Tamara Podemski

Highlights
- Best Picture: Nickel Boys
- Most awards: Nickel Boys (3)

The 28th Toronto Film Critics Association Awards, honouring the best films released in 2024, were announced on December 15, 2024.

The awards gala was held, along with the winner announcements of the Rogers Best Canadian Film Award and Rogers Best Canadian Documentary, at The Omni King Edward Hotel in Toronto, hosted by Canadian actress Tamara Podemski, on February 24, 2025.

== Winners ==
Winners are listed first and in bold, followed by the runners-up.

Best Picture	Best Director
**Nickel Boys**; Anora; The Brutalist	**RaMell Ross – Nickel Boys**; Sean Baker – Anora; Payal Kapadia – All We Imagine as Light
Outstanding Lead Performance	Outstanding Supporting Performance
**Marianne Jean-Baptiste – Hard Truths as Pansy Deacon**; **Mikey Madison – Anora as Anora "Ani" Mikheeva**; Adrien Brody – The Brutalist as László Tóth; Colman Domingo – Sing Sing as John "Divine G" Whitfield; Ralph Fiennes – Conclave as Cardinal Thomas Lawrence; Karla Sofía Gascón – Emilia Pérez as Emilia Pérez; Demi Moore – The Substance as Elisabeth Sparkle	**Yura Borisov – Anora as Igor**; **Kieran Culkin – A Real Pain as Benji Kaplan**; Clarence Maclin – Sing Sing as Clarence "Divine Eye" Maclin; Zoe Saldaña – Emilia Pérez as Rita Mora Castro; Jeremy Strong – The Apprentice as Roy Cohn; Denzel Washington – Gladiator II as Macrinus
Outstanding Performance in a Canadian Film	Outstanding Breakthrough Performance
**Félix-Antoine Duval – Shepherds (Bergers) as Mathyas**; Deragh Campbell – Matt and Mara as Mara; Roy Dupuis – Rumours as Maxime Laplace	**Clarence Maclin – Sing Sing as Clarence "Divine Eye" Maclin**; Karla Sofía Gascón – Emilia Pérez as Emilia Pérez; Mikey Madison – Anora as Anora "Ani" Mikheeva
Best Original Screenplay	Best Adapted Screenplay
**Payal Kapadia – All We Imagine as Light**; Sean Baker – Anora; Justin Kuritzkes – Challengers	**RaMell Ross and Joslyn Barnes – Nickel Boys**; Peter Straughan – Conclave; Denis Villeneuve and Jon Spaihts – Dune: Part Two
Best Animated Feature	Best International Feature
**Flow**; Memoir of a Snail; The Wild Robot	**All We Imagine as Light**; Evil Does Not Exist; Green Border
Best First Feature	Allan King Documentary Award
**Woman of the Hour**; 40 Acres; Janet Planet; The People's Joker	**Dahomey**; Occupied City; Soundtrack to a Coup d'Etat
Rogers Best Canadian Film	Rogers Best Canadian Documentary
**Universal Language**; Rumours; Shepherds (Bergers)	**Any Other Way: The Jackie Shane Story**; Yintah; Your Tomorrow

== Special awards ==
- Company 3 Luminary Award – Tonya Williams
- Company 3 Luminary "Pay It Forward" Grant – Leena Minifie
- Telefilm Canada Emerging Critic Award – Alexander Mooney
- Stella Artois Jay Scott Prize for Best Emerging Artist – J Stevens

== Special citations ==
- Serena Whitney and the Revue Film Society (for their advocacy for community-based independent cinemas)
- No Other Land – Basel Adra, Yuval Abraham, Rachel Szor and Hamdan Ballal (for their years-in the-making observation of forcible evictions in a West Bank community)
