= Toronto Film Critics Association Awards 2023 =

Annual Canadian film awards ceremony

27th Toronto Film Critics Association
- Date: March 4, 2024
- Site: The Omni King Edward Hotel, Toronto
- Hosted by: Amanda Brugel

Highlights
- Best Picture: The Zone of Interest
- Most awards: Barbie; BlackBerry; Killers of the Flower Moon; The Zone of Interest (2)

The 27th Toronto Film Critics Association Awards, honouring the best films released in 2023, were announced on December 17, 2023.

To create a contemporary reflection of inclusivity, the TFCA eliminated gender-based acting categories for 2023. Two Outstanding Lead Performance winners and two Outstanding Supporting Performance winners were chosen by vote, without regard to gender.

The awards gala was held, along with the winner announcements of the Rogers Best Canadian Film Award and Rogers Best Canadian Documentary, at The Omni King Edward Hotel in Toronto, hosted by Canadian actress Amanda Brugel, on March 4, 2024.

== Changes ==
The awards saw various changes from previous years:

- The former categories of Best Actor, Best Actress, Best Supporting Actor, and Best Supporting Actress were retired and replaced with new gender-neutral categories: Outstanding Lead Performance and Outstanding Supporting Performance (with six finalists and two winners per category); two new performance categories were also introduced: Outstanding Performance in a Canadian Film and Outstanding Breakthrough Performance.
- Best Screenplay, formerly a single category, was split into separate categories: Best Original Screenplay and Best Adapted Screenplay.
- The Rogers Best Canadian Film Award, formerly open to both narrative and documentary features, will now be split into two separate awards for narrative and documentary films.

== Winners ==
Winners are listed first and in bold, followed by the runners-up.

Best Picture	Best Director
**The Zone of Interest**; All of Us Strangers; Killers of the Flower Moon	**Jonathan Glazer – The Zone of Interest**; Martin Scorsese – Killers of the Flower Moon; Justine Triet – Anatomy of a Fall
Outstanding Lead Performance	Outstanding Supporting Performance
**Lily Gladstone – Killers of the Flower Moon as Mollie Burkhart**; **Sandra Hüller – Anatomy of a Fall as Sandra Voyter**; Paul Giamatti – The Holdovers as Paul Hunham; Andrew Scott – All of Us Strangers as Adam; Emma Stone – Poor Things as Bella Baxter; Kôji Yakusho – Perfect Days as Hirayama	**Ryan Gosling – Barbie as Ken**; **Da'Vine Joy Randolph – The Holdovers as Mary Lamb**; Robert De Niro – Killers of the Flower Moon as William King Hale; Robert Downey Jr. – Oppenheimer as Lewis Strauss; Glenn Howerton – BlackBerry as Jim Balsillie; Charles Melton – May December as Joe Yoo
Outstanding Performance in a Canadian Film	Outstanding Breakthrough Performance
**Glenn Howerton – BlackBerry as Jim Balsillie**; Jay Baruchel – BlackBerry as Mike Lazaridis; Théodore Pellerin – Solo as Simon	**Teyana Taylor – A Thousand and One as Inez de la Paz**; Charles Melton – May December as Joe Yoo; Dominic Sessa – The Holdovers as Angus Tully
Best Original Screenplay	Best Adapted Screenplay
**Greta Gerwig and Noah Baumbach – Barbie**; Celine Song – Past Lives; Justine Triet and Arthur Harari – Anatomy of a Fall	**Eric Roth and Martin Scorsese – Killers of the Flower Moon**; Andrew Haigh – All of Us Strangers; Tony McNamara – Poor Things
Best Animated Feature	Best International Feature
**Robot Dreams**; The Boy and the Heron; Spider-Man: Across the Spider-Verse	**Fallen Leaves (Kuolleet lehdet)**; Anatomy of a Fall; The Zone of Interest
Best First Feature	Allan King Documentary Award
**Rye Lane**; American Fiction; Past Lives	**20 Days in Mariupol**; The Eternal Memory; Four Daughters; Swan Song
Rogers Best Canadian Film	Rogers Best Canadian Documentary
**BlackBerry**; Humanist Vampire Seeking Consenting Suicidal Person (Vampire humaniste cherche suicidaire consentant); Solo	**Swan Song**; Rojek; Someone Lives Here

== Special awards ==
- Company 3 Luminary Award – Charles Officer
- Telefilm Canada Emerging Critic Award – Winnie Wang
- Stella Artois Jay Scott Prize for Best Emerging Artist – Ariane Louis-Seize
