= National Society of Film Critics Award for Best Supporting Actor =

Film award

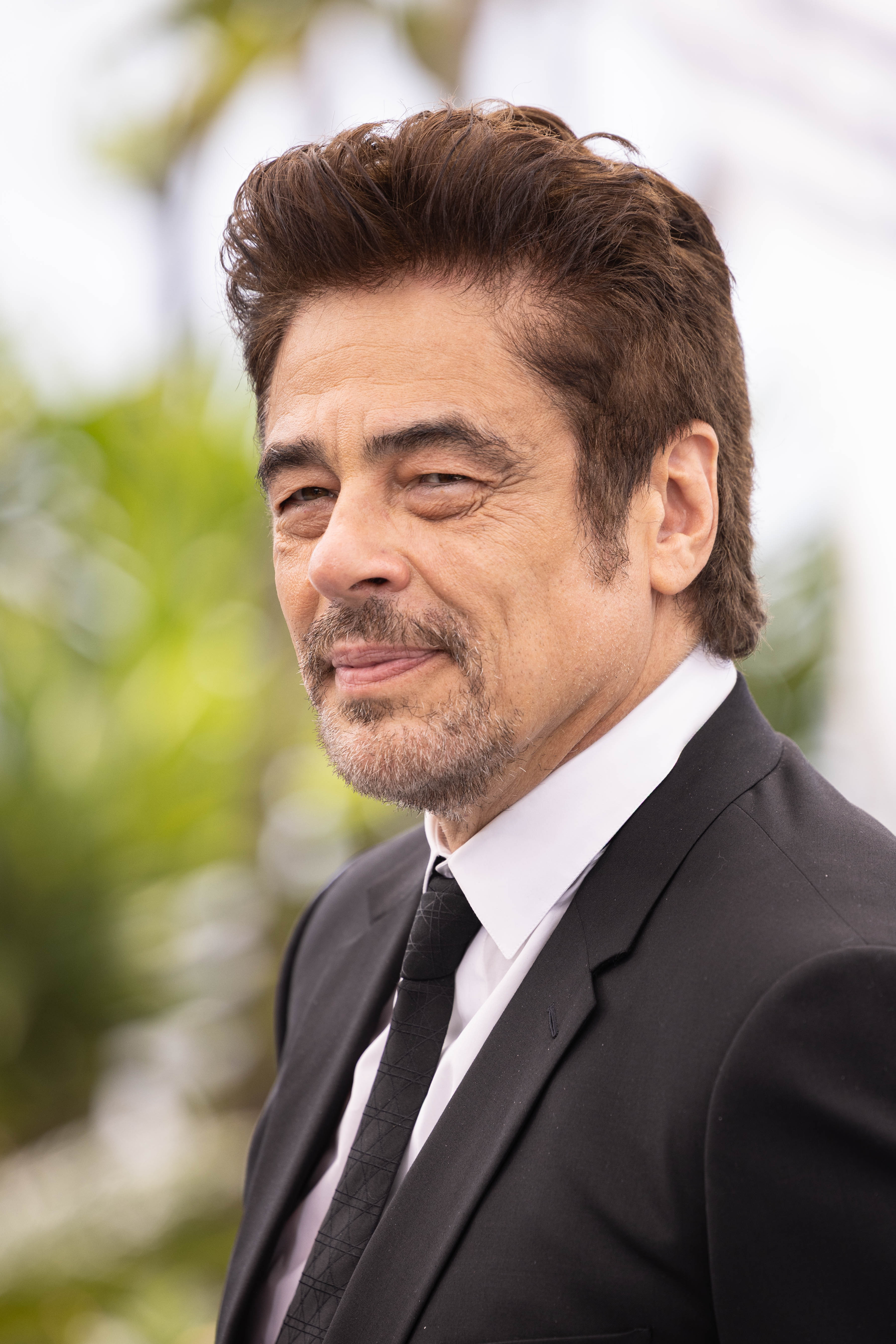
- Current recipient: Benicio del Toro
- Awarded for: Best Performance by an Actor in a Supporting Role
- Country: United States
- Presented by: National Society of Film Critics
- First award: Gene Hackman; Bonnie and Clyde (1967)
- Currently held by: Benicio del Toro; One Battle After Another (2025)
- Website: nsfc.com

The National Society of Film Critics Award for Best Supporting Actor is an annual film award given by the National Society of Film Critics.

The awards was given for the first time in 1968 (honoring films of 1967).

== Winners ==
=== 1960s ===
Year	Winner	Filmw3 rҽ	Role
1967	Gene Hackman	Bonnie and Clyde	Buck Barrow
1968	Seymour Cassel	Faces	Chet
1969	Jack Nicholson	Easy Rider	George Hanson

=== 1970s ===
Year	Winner	Film	Role
1970	Chief Dan George	Little Big Man	Old Lodge Skins
1971	Bruce Dern	Drive, He Said	Coach Bullion
1972	Eddie Albert	The Heartbreak Kid	Mr. Corcoran
1972	Joel Grey	Cabaret	Master of Ceremonies
1973	Robert De Niro	Mean Streets	Johnny Boy
1974	Holger Löwenadler	Lacombe, Lucien	Albert Horn
1975	Henry Gibson	Nashville	Haven Hamilton
1976	Jason Robards	All the President's Men	Ben Bradlee
1977	Edward Fox	A Bridge Too Far	Lt. Gen. Brian Horrocks
1978	Richard Farnsworth	Comes a Horseman	Dodger
1978	Robert Morley	Who Is Killing the Great Chefs of Europe?	Maximillian Vandeveer
1979	Frederic Forrest	Apocalypse Now	3rd Class Jay "Chef" Hicks
1979	Frederic Forrest	The Rose	Huston Dyer

=== 1980s ===
Year	Winner	Film	Role
1980	Joe Pesci	Raging Bull	Joey LaMotta
1981	Robert Preston	S.O.B.	Dr. Irving Finegarten
1982	Mickey Rourke	Diner	Robert "Boogie" Sheftell
1983	Jack Nicholson	Terms of Endearment	Garrett Breedlove
1984	John Malkovich	The Killing Fields	Al Rockoff
1984	John Malkovich	Places in the Heart	Mr. Will
1985	John Gielgud	Plenty	Sir Leonard Darwin
1985	John Gielgud	The Shooting Party	Cornelius Cardew
1986	Dennis Hopper	Blue Velvet	Frank Booth
1987	Morgan Freeman	Street Smart	Fast Black
1988	Dean Stockwell	Married to the Mob	Tony "The Tiger" Russo
1988	Dean Stockwell	Tucker: The Man and His Dream	Howard Hughes
1989	Beau Bridges	The Fabulous Baker Boys	Frank Baker

=== 1990s ===
Year	Winner	Film	Role
1990	Bruce Davison	Longtime Companion	David
1991	Harvey Keitel	Bugsy	Mickey Cohen
1991	Harvey Keitel	Thelma & Louise	Detective Hal Slocumb
1991	Harvey Keitel	Mortal Thoughts	Detective John Woods
1992	Gene Hackman	Unforgiven	Little Bill Daggett
1993	Ralph Fiennes	Schindler's List	Amon Göth
1994	Martin Landau	Ed Wood	Bela Lugosi
1995	Don Cheadle	Devil in a Blue Dress	Mouse Alexander
1996	Martin Donovan	The Portrait of a Lady	Ralph Touchett
1996	Tony Shalhoub	Big Night	Primo
1997	Burt Reynolds	Boogie Nights	Jack Horner
1998	Bill Murray	Rushmore	Herman Blume
1999	Christopher Plummer	The Insider	Mike Wallace

=== 2000s ===
Year	Winner	Film	Role
2000	Benicio del Toro	Traffic	Javier Rodriguez
2001	Steve Buscemi	Ghost World	Seymour Mann
2002	Christopher Walken	Catch Me If You Can	Frank Abagnale, Sr.
2003	Peter Sarsgaard	Shattered Glass	Chuck Lane
2004	Thomas Haden Church	Sideways	Jack Cole
2005	Ed Harris	A History of Violence	Carl Fogarty
2006	Mark Wahlberg	The Departed	Sean Dignam
2007	Casey Affleck	The Assassination of Jesse James by the Coward Robert Ford	Robert Ford
2008	Eddie Marsan	Happy-Go-Lucky	Scott
2009	Paul Schneider	Bright Star	Charles Armitage Brown
2009	Christoph Waltz	Inglourious Basterds	Col. Hans Landa

=== 2010s ===
Year	Winner	Film	Role
2010	Geoffrey Rush	The King's Speech	Lionel Logue
2011	Albert Brooks	Drive	Bernie Rose
2012	Matthew McConaughey	Bernie	Danny Buck Davidson
2012	Matthew McConaughey	Magic Mike	Dallas
2013	James Franco	Spring Breakers	Alien
2014	J. K. Simmons	Whiplash	Terrence Fletcher
2015	Mark Rylance	Bridge of Spies	Rudolf Abel
2016	Mahershala Ali	Moonlight	Juan
2017	Willem Dafoe	The Florida Project	Bobby Hicks
2018	Steven Yeun	Burning	Ben
2019	Brad Pitt	Once Upon a Time in Hollywood	Cliff Booth

=== 2020s ===
Year	Winner	Film	Role
2020	Paul Raci	Sound of Metal	Joe
2021	Anders Danielsen Lie	The Worst Person in the World	Aksel
2022	Ke Huy Quan	Everything Everywhere All at Once	Waymond Wang
2023	Charles Melton	May December	Joe Yoo
2024	Kieran Culkin	A Real Pain	Benji Kaplan
2025	Benicio del Toro	One Battle After Another	Sergio St. Carlos

== Multiple awards ==
2 wins

- Benicio del Toro (2000, 2025)
- Gene Hackman (1967, 1992)
- Jack Nicholson (1969, 1983)

== See also ==
- National Board of Review Award for Best Supporting Actor
- New York Film Critics Circle Award for Best Supporting Actor
- Los Angeles Film Critics Association Award for Best Supporting Actor
