= New York Film Critics Circle Award for Best Supporting Actor =

Award

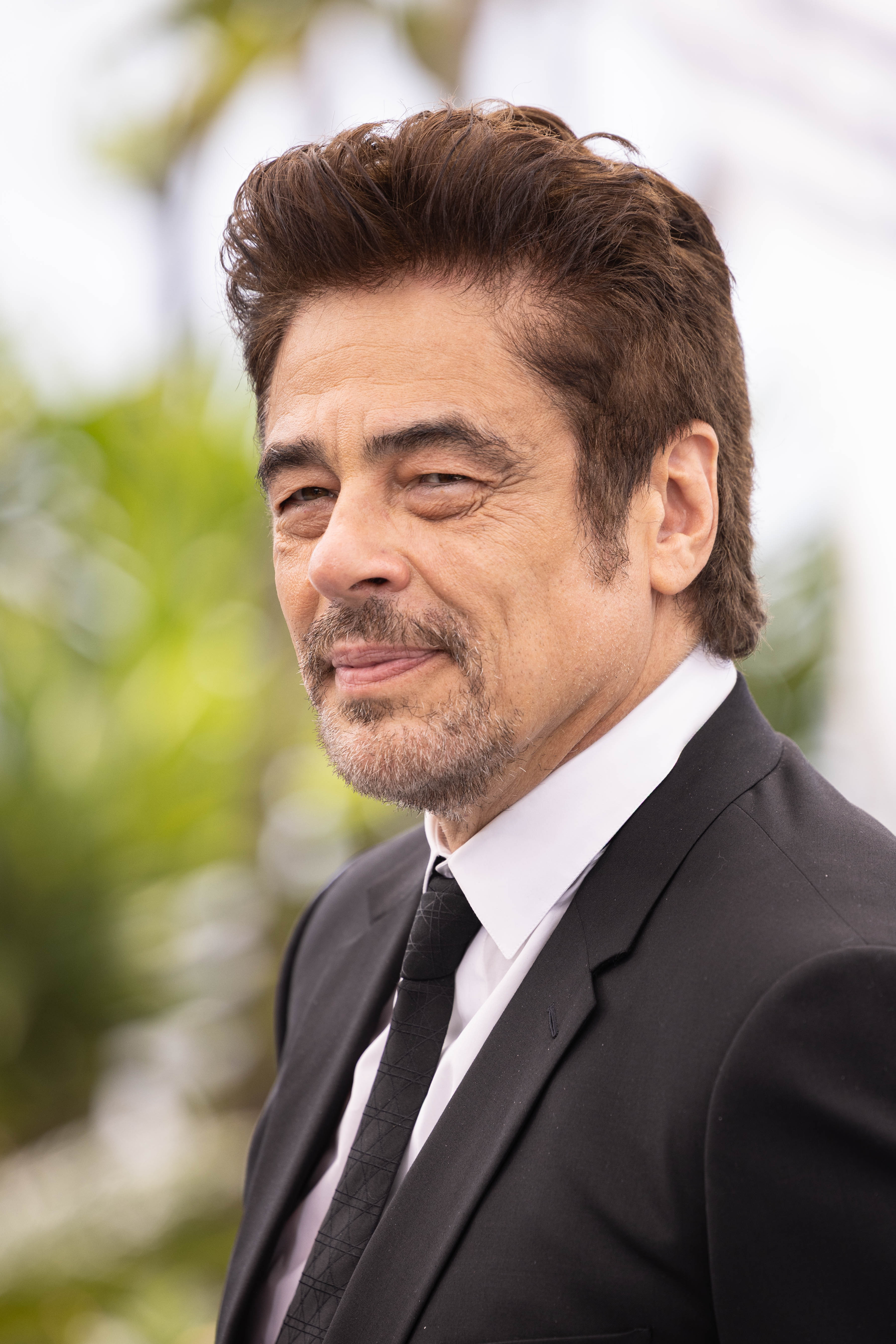
- Current recipient: Benicio del Toro
- Awarded for: Best Performance by an Actor in a Supporting Role
- Country: United States
- Presented by: New York Film Critics Circle
- First award: Jack Nicholson; Easy Rider (1969)
- Currently held by: Benicio del Toro; One Battle After Another (2025)
- Website: nyfcc.com

The New York Film Critics Circle Award for Best Supporting Actor is an award given by the New York Film Critics Circle, honoring the finest achievements in film-making.

== Winners ==
=== 1960s ===
Year	Winner	Role	Film
1969	Jack Nicholson	George Hanson	Easy Rider

=== 1970s ===
Year	Winner	Role	Film
1970	Chief Dan George	Old Lodge Skins	Little Big Man
1971	Ben Johnson	Sam the Lion	The Last Picture Show
1972	Robert Duvall	Tom Hagen	The Godfather
1973	Robert De Niro	Johnny Boy	Mean Streets
1974	Charles Boyer	Baron Raoul	Stavisky
1975	Alan Arkin	Burt Kessler	Hearts of the West
1976	Jason Robards	Ben Bradlee	All the President's Men
1977	Maximilian Schell	Johann	Julia
1978	Christopher Walken	Nikonar "Nick" Chevotarevich	The Deer Hunter
1979	Melvyn Douglas	Benjamin Turnbull Rand	Being There

=== 1980s ===
Year	Winner	Role	Film
1980	Joe Pesci	Joey LaMotta	Raging Bull
1981	John Gielgud	Hobson	Arthur
1982	John Lithgow	Roberta Muldoon	The World According to Garp
1983	Jack Nicholson	Garrett Breedlove	Terms of Endearment
1984	Ralph Richardson	The 6th Earl of Greystoke	Greystoke: The Legend of Tarzan, Lord of the Apes
1985	Klaus Maria Brandauer	Bror von Blixen-Finecke	Out of Africa
1986	Daniel Day-Lewis	Johnny Burfoot	My Beautiful Laundrette
1986	Daniel Day-Lewis	Cecil Vyse	A Room with a View
1987	Morgan Freeman	Fast Black	Street Smart
1988	Dean Stockwell	Tony Russo	Married to the Mob
1988	Dean Stockwell	Howard Hughes	Tucker: The Man and His Dream
1989	Alan Alda	Lester	Crimes and Misdemeanors

=== 1990s ===
Year	Winner	Role	Film
1990	Bruce Davison	David	Longtime Companion
1991	Samuel L. Jackson	Gator Purify	Jungle Fever
1992	Gene Hackman	Little Bill Daggett	Unforgiven
1993	Ralph Fiennes	Amon Göth	Schindler's List
1994	Martin Landau	Bela Lugosi	Ed Wood
1995	Kevin Spacey	Casey Schuler	Outbreak
1995	Kevin Spacey	John Doe	Se7en
1995	Kevin Spacey	Buddy Ackerman	Swimming with Sharks
1995	Kevin Spacey	Roger "Verbal" Kint	The Usual Suspects
1996	Harry Belafonte	Seldom Seen	Kansas City
1997	Burt Reynolds	Jack Horner	Boogie Nights
1998	Bill Murray	Herman Blume	Rushmore
1999	John Malkovich	John Horatio Malkovich	Being John Malkovich

=== 2000s ===
Year	Winner	Role	Film
2000	Benicio del Toro	Javier Rodriguez	Traffic
2001	Steve Buscemi	Seymour Johnson	Ghost World
2002	Dennis Quaid	Frank Whitaker	Far from Heaven
2003	Eugene Levy	Mitch Cohen	A Mighty Wind
2004	Clive Owen	Larry Gray	Closer
2005	William Hurt	Richard "Richie" Cusack	A History of Violence
2006	Jackie Earle Haley	Ronald James McGorvey	Little Children
2007	Javier Bardem	Anton Chigurh	No Country for Old Men
2008	Josh Brolin	Dan White	Milk
2009	Christoph Waltz	Col. Hans Landa	Inglourious Basterds

=== 2010s ===
Year	Winner	Role	Film
2010	Mark Ruffalo	Paul Hatfield	The Kids Are All Right
2011	Albert Brooks	Bernie Rose	Drive
2012	Matthew McConaughey	Danny Buck Davidson	Bernie
2012	Matthew McConaughey	Dallas	Magic Mike
2013	Jared Leto	Rayon	Dallas Buyers Club
2014	J. K. Simmons	Terence Fletcher	Whiplash
2015	Mark Rylance	Rudolf Abel	Bridge of Spies
2016	Mahershala Ali	Juan	Moonlight
2017	Willem Dafoe	Bobby Hicks	The Florida Project
2018	Richard E. Grant	Jack Hock	Can You Ever Forgive Me?
2019	Joe Pesci	Russell Bufalino	The Irishman

=== 2020s ===
Year	Winner	Role	Film
2020	Chadwick Boseman	Norman Earl "Stormin' Norman" Holloway	Da 5 Bloods
2021	Kodi Smit-McPhee	Peter Gordon	The Power of the Dog
2022	Ke Huy Quan	Waymond Wang	Everything Everywhere All at Once
2023	Charles Melton	Joe Yoo	May December
2024	Kieran Culkin	Benji Kaplan	A Real Pain
2025	Benicio del Toro	Sergio St Carlos	One Battle After Another

== Multiple awards ==
=== 2 wins ===
- Benicio del Toro (2000, 2025)
- Jack Nicholson (1969, 1983)
- Joe Pesci (1980, 2019)

== See also ==
- Academy Award for Best Supporting Actor
- National Board of Review Award for Best Supporting Actor
- National Society of Film Critics Award for Best Supporting Actor
- Los Angeles Film Critics Association Award for Best Supporting Actor
