= Toronto Film Critics Association Award for Outstanding Breakthrough Performance =

Award given annually by the Toronto Film Critics Association

- Awarded for: Outstanding performance by an emerging actor or actress
- Country: Canada
- Presented by: Toronto Film Critics Association
- Currently held by: Teyana Taylor, A Thousand and One
- Website: torontofilmcritics.com

The Toronto Film Critics Association Award for Outstanding Breakthrough Performance is one of the annual awards given by the Toronto Film Critics Association. It was presented for the first time in 2023.

== Winners and runners-up ==
=== 2020s ===
Year	Winner	Film	Role	Ref.
2023	Teyana Taylor	A Thousand and One	Inez de la Paz	
2023	Charles Melton	May December	Joe Yoo	
2023	Dominic Sessa	The Holdovers	Angus Tully	
2024	Clarence Maclin	Sing Sing	Clarence "Divine Eye" Maclin	
2024	Karla Sofía Gascón	Emilia Pérez	Emilia Pérez	
2024	Mikey Madison	Anora	Anora "Ani" Mikheeva	
2025	Abou Sangaré	Souleymane's Story	Souleymane	
2025	Miles Caton	Sinners	Samuel "Sammie" Moore	
2025	Chase Infiniti	One Battle After Another	Willa Ferguson	
