= Toronto Film Critics Association Award for Best Director =

Canadian film award

The Toronto Film Critics Association Award for Best Director is one of the annual awards given by the Toronto Film Critics Association.

== Winners ==
=== 1990s ===
Year	Winner	Film	Ref
1997	Atom Egoyan	The Sweet Hereafter	
1997	Paul Thomas Anderson	Boogie Nights	
1997	James Cameron	Titanic	
1997	Curtis Hanson	L.A. Confidential	
1997	Ang Lee	The Ice Storm	
1998	Steven Spielberg	Saving Private Ryan	
1998	Steven Soderbergh	Out of Sight	
1998	Todd Solondz	Happiness	
1999	Paul Thomas Anderson	Magnolia	
1999	Sam Mendes	American Beauty	
1999	Steven Soderbergh	The Limey	

=== 2000s ===
Year	Winner	Film	Ref
2000	Steven Soderbergh	Traffic	
2000	Ang Lee	Crouching Tiger, Hidden Dragon	
2001	David Lynch	Mulholland Drive	
2001	Peter Jackson	The Lord of the Rings: The Fellowship of the Ring	
2001	Jean-Pierre Jeunet	Amélie	
2002	Paul Thomas Anderson	Punch-Drunk Love	
2002	Alfonso Cuarón	Y Tu Mamá También	
2002	Todd Haynes	Far from Heaven	
2003	Peter Jackson	The Lord of the Rings: The Return of the King	
2004	Michel Gondry	Eternal Sunshine of the Spotless Mind	
2005	David Cronenberg	A History of Violence	
2006	Jean-Pierre and Luc Dardenne	The Child (L'Enfant)	
2006	Stephen Frears	The Queen	
2006	Paul Greengrass	United 93	
2006	Martin Scorsese	The Departed	
2007	Joel Coen and Ethan Coen	No Country for Old Men	
2007	David Cronenberg	Eastern Promises	
2007	David Fincher	Zodiac	
2008	Jonathan Demme	Rachel Getting Married	
2008	Danny Boyle	Slumdog Millionaire	
2008	Andrew Stanton	WALL-E	
2009	Kathryn Bigelow	The Hurt Locker	
2009	Steve McQueen	Hunger	
2009	Quentin Tarantino	Inglourious Basterds	

=== 2010s ===
Year	Winner	Film	Ref
2010	David Fincher	The Social Network	
2010	Darren Aronofsky	Black Swan	
2010	Christopher Nolan	Inception	
2011	Terrence Malick	The Tree of Life	
2011	Michel Hazanavicius	The Artist	
2011	Nicolas Winding Refn	Drive	
2012	Paul Thomas Anderson	The Master	
2012	Kathryn Bigelow	Zero Dark Thirty	
2012	Leos Carax	Holy Motors	
2013	Alfonso Cuarón	Gravity	
2013	Joel Coen and Ethan Coen	Inside Llewyn Davis	
2013	Steve McQueen	12 Years a Slave	
2014	Richard Linklater	Boyhood	
2014	Paul Thomas Anderson	Inherent Vice	
2014	Wes Anderson	The Grand Budapest Hotel	
2015	Todd Haynes	Carol	
2015	Tom McCarthy	Spotlight	
2015	George Miller	Mad Max: Fury Road	
2016	Maren Ade	Toni Erdmann	
2016	Damien Chazelle	La La Land	
2016	Barry Jenkins	Moonlight	
2017	Greta Gerwig	Lady Bird	
2017	Paul Thomas Anderson	Phantom Thread	
2017	Jordan Peele	Get Out	
2018	Alfonso Cuarón	Roma	
2018	Lee Chang-dong	Burning	
2018	Paul Schrader	First Reformed	
2019	Bong Joon-ho	Parasite	
2019	Noah Baumbach	Marriage Story	
2019	Martin Scorsese	The Irishman	

=== 2020s ===
Year	Winner	Film	Ref
2020	Chloé Zhao	Nomadland	
2020	Kelly Reichardt	First Cow	
2020	Lee Isaac Chung	Minari	
2021	Jane Campion	The Power of the Dog	
2021	Ryusuke Hamaguchi	Drive My Car	
2021	Denis Villeneuve	Dune	
2022	Charlotte Wells	Aftersun	
2022	Daniel Kwan and Daniel Scheinert	Everything Everywhere All at Once	
2022	Sarah Polley	Women Talking	
2023	Jonathan Glazer	The Zone of Interest	
2023	Martin Scorsese	Killers of the Flower Moon	
2023	Justine Triet	Anatomy of a Fall	
2024	RaMell Ross	Nickel Boys	
2024	Sean Baker	Anora	
2024	Payal Kapadia	All We Imagine as Light	
2025	Paul Thomas Anderson	One Battle After Another	
2025	Ryan Coogler	Sinners	
2025	Oliver Laxe	Sirāt	
