= Toronto Film Critics Association Award for Best Screenplay =

Canadian film award

The Toronto Film Critics Association Award for Best Screenplay is one of the annual awards given by the Toronto Film Critics Association.

== Winners ==
=== 1990s ===
Year	Winner	Film	Ref
1999	Charlie Kaufman	Being John Malkovich	
1999	Paul Thomas Anderson	Magnolia	
1999	Alan Ball	American Beauty	

=== 2000s ===
Year	Winner	Film	Ref
2000	Kenneth Lonergan	You Can Count on Me	
2000	Hirokazu Kore-eda	After Life	
2001	Christopher Nolan	Memento	
2001	Wes Anderson, Owen Wilson	The Royal Tenenbaums	
2001	Terry Zwigoff, Daniel Clowes	Ghost World	
2002	Charlie Kaufman	Adaptation.	
2002	Paul Thomas Anderson	Punch-Drunk Love	
2002	David Hare	The Hours	
2003	Sofia Coppola	Lost in Translation	
2003	Denys Arcand	The Barbarian Invasions	
2004	Charlie Kaufman	Eternal Sunshine of the Spotless Mind	
2005	Noah Baumbach	The Squid and the Whale	
2006	Peter Morgan	The Queen	
2006	Guillermo Arriaga	Babel	
2006	William Monahan	The Departed	
2007	Joel Coen, Ethan Coen	No Country for Old Men	
2007	Diablo Cody	Juno	
2007	Tony Gilroy	Michael Clayton	
2008	Jenny Lumet	Rachel Getting Married	
2008	Peter Morgan	Frost/Nixon	
2008	John Patrick Shanley	Doubt	
2009	Quentin Tarantino	Inglourious Basterds	
2009	Jason Reitman, Sheldon Turner	Up in the Air	
2009	Joel Coen, Ethan Coen	A Serious Man	

=== 2010s ===
Year	Winner	Film	Ref
2010	Aaron Sorkin	The Social Network	
2010	Joel Coen, Ethan Coen	True Grit	
2010	David Seidler	The King's Speech	
2011	Steven Zaillian, Aaron Sorkin	Moneyball	
2011	Terrence Malick	The Tree of Life	
2011	Alexander Payne, Nat Faxon, Jim Rash	The Descendants	
2012	Paul Thomas Anderson	The Master	
2012	Mark Boal	Zero Dark Thirty	
2012	Tony Kushner	Lincoln	
2013	Spike Jonze	Her	
2013	Joel Coen, Ethan Coen	Inside Llewyn Davis	
2013	Richard Linklater, Ethan Hawke, Julie Delpy	Before Midnight	
2014	Wes Anderson	The Grand Budapest Hotel	
2014	Paul Thomas Anderson	Inherent Vice	
2014	Richard Linklater	Boyhood	
2015	Adam McKay, Charles Randolph	The Big Short	
2015	Charlie Kaufman	Anomalisa	
2015	Phyllis Nagy	Carol	
2015	Josh Singer, Tom McCarthy	Spotlight	
2016	Kenneth Lonergan	Manchester by the Sea	
2016	Maren Ade	Toni Erdmann	
2016	Barry Jenkins	Moonlight	
2017	Jordan Peele	Get Out	
2017	Greta Gerwig	Lady Bird	
2017	Martin McDonagh	Three Billboards Outside Ebbing, Missouri	
2018	Deborah Davis, Tony McNamara	The Favourite	
2018	Paul Schrader	First Reformed	
2018	Alfonso Cuarón	Roma	
2019	Steven Zaillian	The Irishman	
2019	Noah Baumbach	Marriage Story	
2019	Bong Joon-ho, Han Jin-won	Parasite	

=== 2020s ===
Year	Winner	Film	Ref
2020	Lee Isaac Chung	Minari	
2020	Darius Marder, Abraham Marder	Sound of Metal	
2020	Chloé Zhao	Nomadland	
2021	Ryusuke Hamaguchi, Takamasa Oe	Drive My Car	
2021	Paul Thomas Anderson	Licorice Pizza	
2021	Jane Campion	The Power of the Dog	
2022	Martin McDonagh	The Banshees of Inisherin	
2022	Todd Field	Tár	
2022	Sarah Polley	Women Talking	

== Original Screenplay ==
Year	Winner	Film	Ref
2023	Greta Gerwig, Noah Baumbach	Barbie	
2023	Justine Triet, Arthur Harari	Anatomy of a Fall	
2023	Celine Song	Past Lives	
2024	Payal Kapadia	All We Imagine as Light	
2024	Sean Baker	Anora	
2024	Justin Kuritzkes	Challengers	
2025	Ryan Coogler	Sinners	
2025	Ronald Bronstein and Josh Safdie	Marty Supreme	
2025	Joachim Trier and Eskil Vogt	Sentimental Value	

== Adapted Screenplay ==
Year	Winner	Film	Ref
2023	Eric Roth, Martin Scorsese	Killers of the Flower Moon	
2023	Andrew Haigh	All of Us Strangers	
2023	Tony McNamara	Poor Things	
2024	RaMell Ross, Joslyn Barnes	Nickel Boys	
2024	Peter Straughan	Conclave	
2024	Denis Villeneuve, Jon Spaihts	Dune: Part Two	
2025	Paul Thomas Anderson	One Battle After Another	
2025	Maggie O'Farrell and Chloé Zhao	Hamnet	
2025	Lee Ja-hye, Lee Kyoung-mi, Don McKellar and Chan-wook Park	No Other Choice	
