= Toronto Film Critics Association Award for Outstanding Lead Performance =

Award given annually by the Toronto Film Critics Association

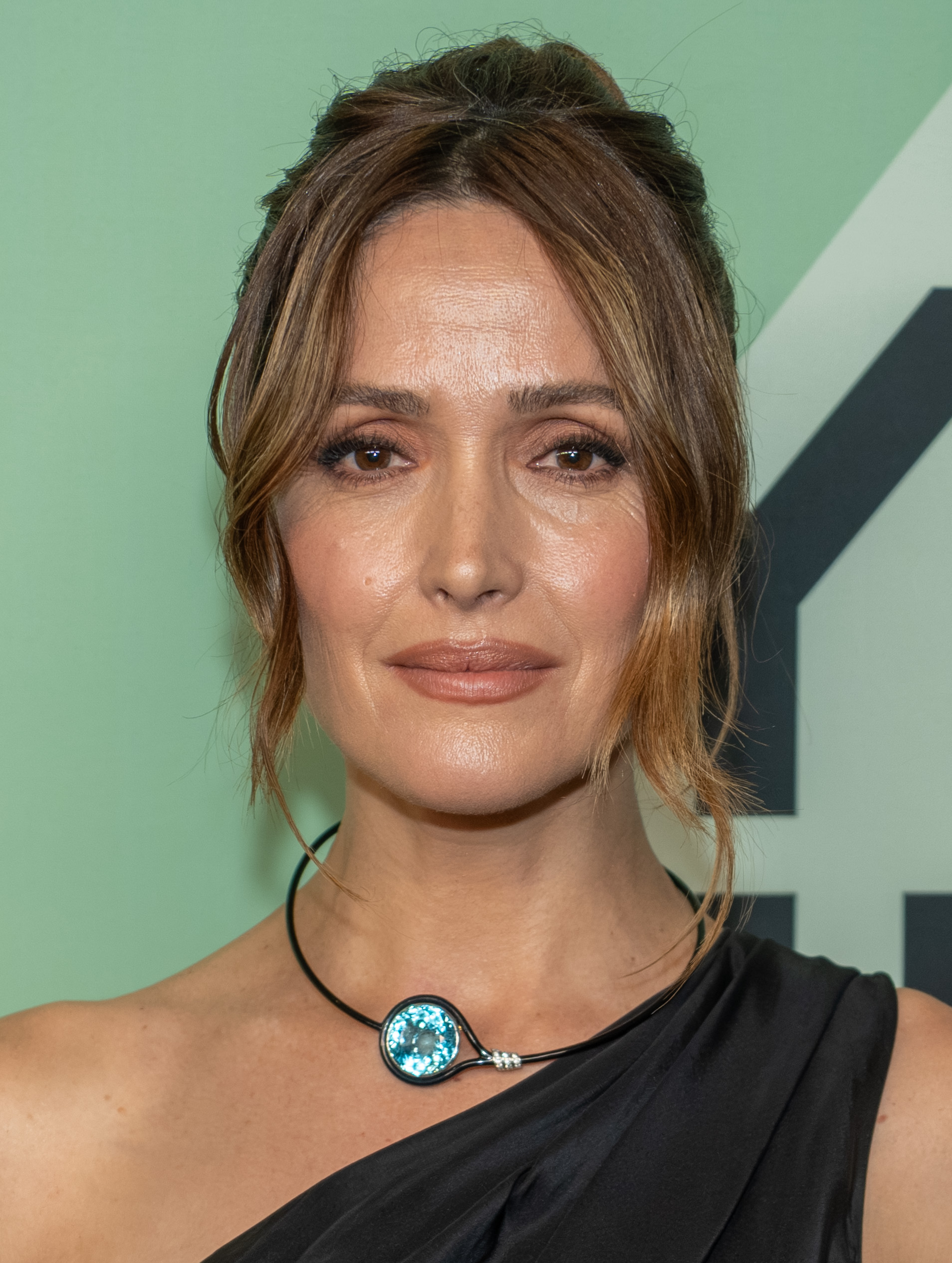
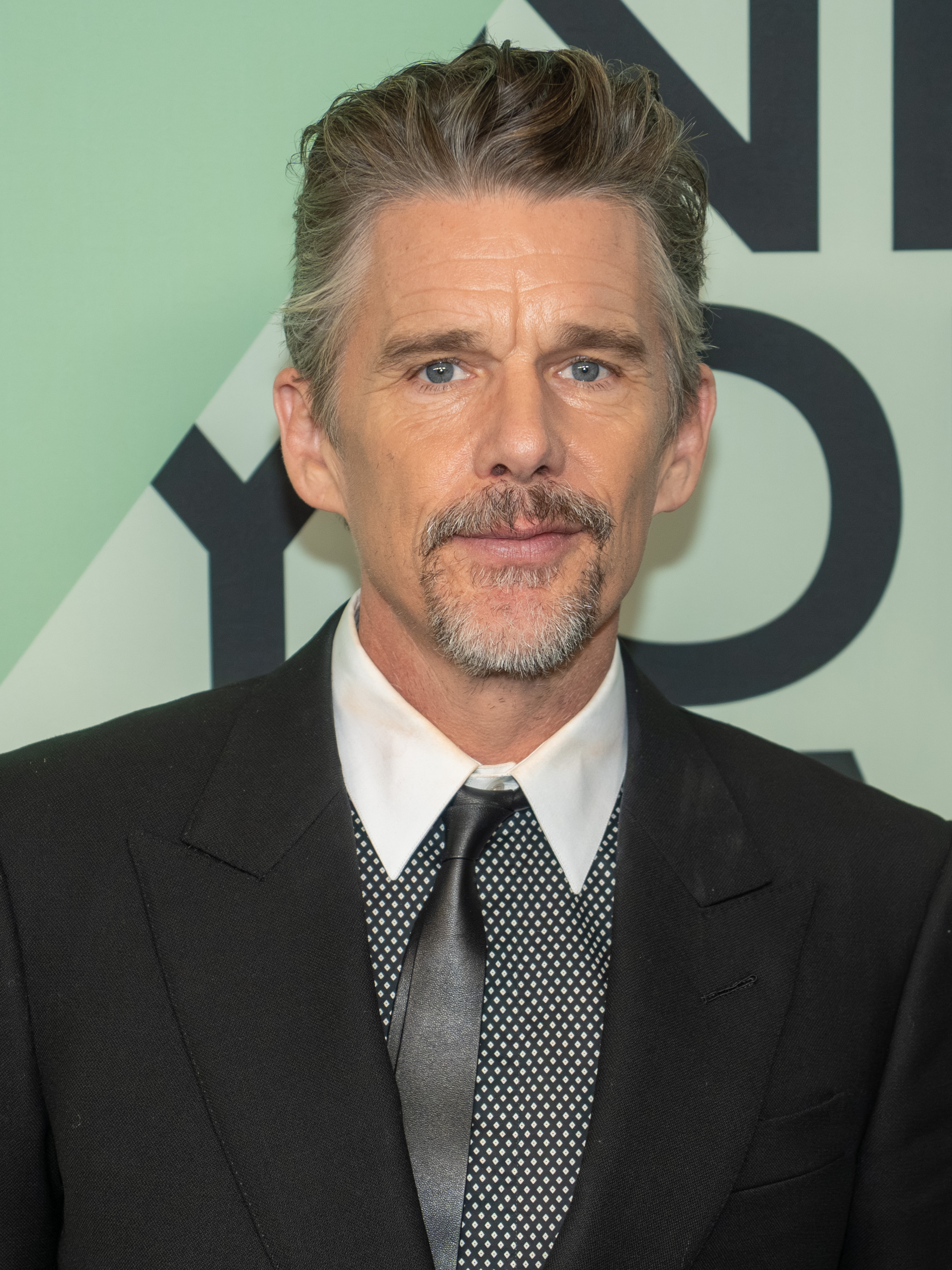
- The 2025 recipients: Rose Byrne (left) and Ethan Hawke (right)
- Awarded for: Outstanding Performance by an Actor or an Actress in a Leading Role
- Country: Canada
- Presented by: Toronto Film Critics Association
- Currently held by: Rose Byrne – If I Had Legs I'd Kick You; Ethan Hawke – Blue Moon (2025)
- Website: torontofilmcritics.com

The Toronto Film Critics Association Award for Outstanding Lead Performance is one of the annual awards given by the Toronto Film Critics Association. It was presented for the first time in 2023, following the merger of the formerly individual awards of Best Actor and Best Actress.

== Winners and runners-up ==
=== 2020s ===
Year	Winner	Film	Role	Ref.
2023	Lily Gladstone	Killers of the Flower Moon	Mollie Burkhart	
2023	Sandra Hüller	Anatomy of a Fall	Sandra Voyter	
2023	Paul Giamatti	The Holdovers	Paul Hunham	
2023	Andrew Scott	All of Us Strangers	Adam	
2023	Emma Stone	Poor Things	Bella Baxter	
2023	Kôji Yakusho	Perfect Days	Hirayama	
2024	Marianne Jean-Baptiste	Hard Truths	Pansey	
2024	Mikey Madison	Anora	Anora "Ani" Mikheeva	
2024	Adrien Brody	The Brutalist	László Tóth	
2024	Colman Domingo	Sing Sing	John "Divine G" Whitfield	
2024	Ralph Fiennes	Conclave	Thomas Cardinal Lawrence	
2024	Karla Sofía Gascón	Emilia Pérez	Emilia Pérez / Juan "Manitas" Del Monte	
2024	Demi Moore	The Substance	Elisabeth Sparkle	
2025	Rose Byrne	If I Had Legs I'd Kick You	Linda	
2025	Ethan Hawke	Blue Moon	Lorenz Hart	
2025	Jessie Buckley	Hamnet	Agnes Shakespeare	
2025	Leonardo DiCaprio	One Battle After Another	Bob Ferguson	
2025	Michael B. Jordan	Sinners	The Smokestack Twins	
2025	Wagner Moura	The Secret Agent	Armando	
