= Charles Melton =

American actor (born 1991)

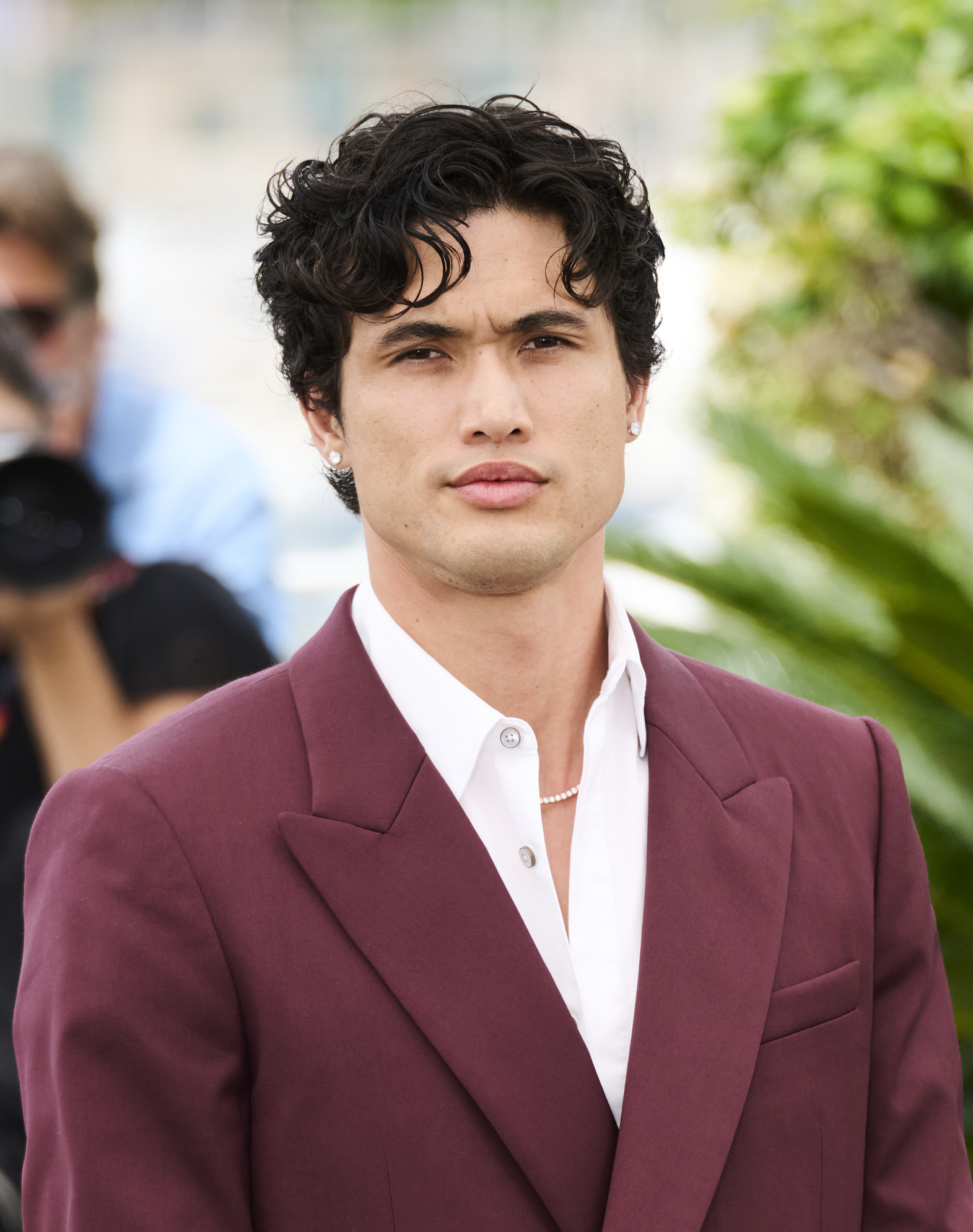
- Melton in 2026
- Born: Charles Michael Melton; January 4, 1991 (age 35); Juneau, Alaska, U.S.
- Education: Kansas State University
- Occupation: Actor
- Years active: 2010–present
- Spouse: Camille Summers-Valli (m. 2026)
- Children: 1

Charles Michael Melton (born January 4, 1991) is an American actor. After working as a fashion model, Melton ventured to acting with guest roles on the television series Glee (2014) and American Horror Story: Hotel (2015–2016). His breakthrough came with his portrayal of Reggie Mantle in the CW series Riverdale (2017–2023).

Melton gained recognition for his leading role in the romance film The Sun Is Also a Star (2019). For his acclaimed portrayal in the drama film May December (2023), Melton earned nominations for a Critics' Choice Movie Award and a Golden Globe Award. In 2026, he produced and starred as a personal trainer in the second season of the Netflix anthology series Beef, for which he received two nominations—Outstanding Limited or Anthology Series and Outstanding Supporting Actor—at the 78th Primetime Emmy Awards.

== Early life ==
Charles Michael Melton was born on January 4, 1991, in Juneau, Alaska, to Sukyong and Phil Melton. His father is an American with English ancestry; his mother is a Korean immigrant who moved to the United States with Charles's father in 1990. Melton is the eldest child, having two younger sisters. His family moved frequently because his father worked for the military. At one point, the family lived in Pyeongtaek, Gyeonggi, South Korea, for about five years. They eventually settled down in Manhattan, Kansas where Melton graduated from Manhattan High School in 2009. Melton studied at nearby Kansas State University, where he played as a defensive back on the football team under coach Bill Snyder. He dropped out of college at age 20 to pursue acting and moved to Los Angeles, California, in 2012.

He also previously worked as a dog walker on the app Wag.

== Career ==
He was first successful as a model, having booked gigs for Dolce & Gabbana, Kenneth Cole and MAC. His first acting roles included guest spots on Glee and American Horror Story.

Melton received mainstream attention in 2017 when he was cast as Reggie Mantle in the second season of the CW series Riverdale. He replaced Ross Butler, who left the cast due to his commitment to 13 Reasons Why. After recurring during the second season, Melton officially became a series regular on Riverdale starting with the third season. In 2019, he starred in his first feature film as Daniel Bae in The Sun Is Also a Star, the film adaptation of the book of the same name by Nicola Yoon. Because of that movie, he is the first Korean-American and Asian-American actor to lead a teen romance film from a major Hollywood studio.

In 2023, he co-starred in the Todd Haynes directed Netflix drama film May December where he acted alongside Natalie Portman and Julianne Moore. Melton's performance received critical acclaim, winning Best Supporting Actor from the Gotham Independent Film Awards, National Society of Film Critics Awards and the New York Film Critics Awards. He also received a nomination for the Golden Globe Award.

He starred in Warfare, an A24 war movie written and directed by Alex Garland and Ray Mendoza. He is set to star in Love Child with Elizabeth Olsen with a release date to be announced. He starred in Beef season 2 alongside Oscar Isaac, Carey Mulligan, Cailee Spaeny, and Yuh-Jung Youn, as well as Her Private Hell alongside Sophie Thatcher and Havana Rose Liu.

On August 20, 2026, it was announced that Melton was in final negotiations to play Kakashi Hatake for the live-action film adaption of Naruto, which will be directed and written by Destin Daniel Cretton.

His charity work includes serving as a Global Ambassador for Special Olympics International.

== Personal life ==
Melton dated Riverdale co-star Camila Mendes from October 2018 to December 2019. They dated again briefly in 2021. He dated Chase Sui Wonders from early to mid-2022. He dated Chloe Bennet in 2023.

Melton is currently in a relationship with director Camille Summers-Valli. In January 2026, it was announced that Summers-Valli was pregnant with their first child. On March 9, 2026, Melton confirmed the birth of their daughter via Instagram. On August 20, 2026, it was reported that Melton quietly married Summers-Valli.

Melton has two sisters, Patricia and Tammy. Tammy works with him as his producing partner.

== Filmography ==
=== Film ===
Key
†	Denotes films that have not yet been released

Year	Title	Role	Notes
2018	The Thinning: New World Order	Cage	Web film
2019	The Sun Is Also a Star	Daniel Bae	
2020	Bad Boys for Life	Rafe	
2020	Mainstream	Himself	Cameo
2021	Heart of Champions	Chris Davenport	
2022	Secret Headquarters	Hawaii	
2023	May December	Joe Yoo	
2025	Warfare	Jake	
2026	Her Private Hell	Private K	
2027	Untitled Daniels film †		Filming
2027	Saturn Return †		Post-production

=== Television ===
Year	Title	Role	Notes
2014	Glee	Model	Episode: "New New York"
2015–2016	American Horror Story: Hotel	Mr. Wu	2 episodes
2017–2023	Riverdale	Reggie Mantle	Recurring (season 2); main (seasons 3–7)
2021	American Horror Stories	Wyatt	Episode: "The Naughty List"
2023	Poker Face	Davis McDowell	Episode: "The Future of the Sport"
2023	History of the World, Part II	Joshy Mudman	3 episodes
2026	Beef	Austin Davis	Main role (season 2)

=== Music videos ===
Year	Title	Artist(s)
2016	"Save My Soul"	JoJo
2019	"Break Up with Your Girlfriend, I'm Bored"	Ariana Grande
2025	"Love Hangover"	Jennie featuring Dominic Fike
2026	"Jealous Lover"	The Rolling Stones

== Awards and nominations ==
Award ceremony	Year	Category	Work	Result	Ref.
Alliance of Women Film Journalists	2024	Best Supporting Actor	May December	Nominated	
Astra Film Awards	2024	Best Supporting Actor	May December	Nominated	
Austin Film Critics Association	2024	Best Supporting Actor	May December	Nominated	
British Independent Film Awards	2025	Best Ensemble Performance	Warfare	Won	
Boston Online Film Critics Association	2023	Best Supporting Actor	May December	Won	
Boston Society of Film Critics	2023	Best Supporting Actor	May December	Runner-up (Note: Shared with Robert Downey Jr. for Oppenheimer and Mark Ruffalo for Poor Things.)	
Capri Hollywood International Film Festival	2023	Breakthrough Actor	May December	Won	
Celebration of Cinema and Television	2023	Breakthrough Performance Award	May December	Won	
Chicago Film Critics Association	2023	Best Supporting Actor	May December	Won	
Chicago Film Critics Association	2023	Most Promising Performer	May December	Won	
Chicago Indie Critics	2024	Best Supporting Actor	May December	Nominated	
Chicago Indie Critics	2024	Breakout Artist	May December	Nominated	
Columbus Film Critics Association	2024	Best Supporting Performance	May December	Nominated	
Columbus Film Critics Association	2024	Breakthrough Film Artist	May December	Nominated	
Critics' Choice Movie Awards	2024	Best Supporting Actor	May December	Nominated	
Dallas–Fort Worth Film Critics Association	2023	Best Supporting Actor	May December	Runner-up	
Denver Film Critics Society	2024	Best Supporting Performance by an Actor, Male	May December	Nominated	
DiscussingFilm Critic Awards	2024	Best Supporting Actor	May December	Won	
DiscussingFilm Critic Awards	2024	Best Breakthrough Performance	May December	Won	
Dublin Film Critics Circle	2023	Best Actor	May December	Nominated	
Florida Film Critics Circle	2023	Best Supporting Actor	May December	Won	
Florida Film Critics Circle	2023	Breakout Award	May December	Nominated	
Georgia Film Critics Association	2024	Best Supporting Actor	May December	Runner-up	
Georgia Film Critics Association	2024	Breakthrough Award	May December	Runner-up (Note: Shared with Ayo Edebiri.)	
Golden Globe Awards	2024	Best Supporting Actor – Motion Picture	May December	Nominated	
Gotham Awards	2023	Outstanding Supporting Performance	May December	Won	
Greater Western New York Film Critics Association	2023	Best Supporting Actor	May December	Won	
Greater Western New York Film Critics Association	2023	Breakthrough Performance	May December	Won	
Indiana Film Journalists Association Awards	2023	Best Supporting Performance	May December	Nominated	
Indiana Film Journalists Association Awards	2023	Breakout of the Year	May December	Runner-up	
Independent Spirit Awards	2024	Best Supporting Performance	May December	Nominated	
Las Vegas Film Critics Society Awards	2023	Best Supporting Actor	May December	Nominated	
Latino Entertainment Journalists Association	2023	Best Supporting Actor	May December	Nominated	
London Film Critics' Circle	2024	Supporting Actor of the Year	May December	Won	
MTV Movie & TV Awards	2019	Best Kiss	Riverdale	Nominated (Note: Shared with Camila Mendes.)	
Music City Film Critics Association	2024	Best Supporting Actor	May December	Nominated	
National Society of Film Critics	2023	Best Supporting Actor	May December	Won	
New York Film Critics Circle Awards	2023	Best Supporting Actor	May December	Won	
New York Film Critics Online Awards	2023	Breakthrough Performer	May December	Won	
North Carolina Film Critics Association	2024	Best Supporting Actor	May December	Nominated	
North Carolina Film Critics Association	2024	Best Breakthrough Performance	May December	Nominated	
North Dakota Film Society	2024	Best Supporting Actor	May December	Nominated	
North Texas Film Critics Association Awards	2023	Best Newcomer	May December	Nominated	
Online Association of Female Film Critics	2023	Best Supporting Actor	May December	Won (Note: Shared with Dominic Sessa for The Holdovers.)	
Online Association of Female Film Critics	2023	Breakthrough Performance	May December	Won	
Online Film & Television Association	2023	Best Supporting Actor	May December	Nominated	
Online Film & Television Association	2023	Breakthrough Performance: Male	May December	Runner-up	
Philadelphia Film Critics Circle	2023	Best Supporting Actor	May December	Runner-up	
Philadelphia Film Critics Circle	2023	Best Breakthrough Performance	May December	Won	
Primetime Emmy Awards	2026	Outstanding Limited or Anthology Series	Beef	Nominated	
Primetime Emmy Awards	2026	Outstanding Supporting Actor in a Limited or Anthology Series or Movie	Beef	Nominated	
San Diego Film Critics Society	2023	Best Supporting Actor	May December	Nominated	
San Francisco Bay Area Film Critics Circle	2024	Best Supporting Actor	May December	Nominated	
Santa Barbara International Film Festival	2024	Virtuoso Award	May December	Won	
Satellite Awards	2024	Best Supporting Actor – Motion Picture	May December	Nominated	
Seattle Film Critics Society	2024	Best Supporting Actor	May December	Won	
St. Louis Film Critics Association Awards	2023	Best Supporting Actor	May December	Runner-up (Note: Shared with Robert Downey Jr. for Oppenheimer.)	
Teen Choice Awards	2019	Choice Summer Movie Actor	The Sun is Also a Star	Nominated	
Toronto Film Critics Association	2023	Best Supporting Performance	May December	Runner-up (Note: Shared with Robert De Niro for Killers of the Flower Moon, Robert Downey Jr. for Oppenheimer and Glenn Howerton for BlackBerry.)	
Toronto Film Critics Association	2023	Best Breakthrough Performance	May December	Runner-up	
UK Film Critics Association	2023	Best Supporting Actor	May December	Nominated	
Utah Film Critics Association	2024	Best Supporting Performance, Male	May December	Runner-up	
Variety & Golden Globe's Breakthrough Artist Awards	2023	Breakthrough Artist Award	May December	Honoree	
Washington D.C. Area Film Critics Association	2023	Best Supporting Actor	May December	Won	
Women Film Critics Circle	2023	Best Actor	May December	Runner-up (Note: Shared with Colman Domingo for Rustin and Gael García Bernal for Cassandro)	
