= May December =

2023 American film by Todd Haynes

- Release poster
- Directed by: Todd Haynes
- Screenplay by: Samy Burch
- Story by: Samy Burch; Alex Mechanik
- Produced by: Natalie Portman; Sophie Mas; Christine Vachon; Pamela Koffler; Grant S. Johnson; Tyler W. Konney; Jessica Elbaum; Will Ferrell
- Starring: Natalie Portman; Julianne Moore; Charles Melton
- Cinematography: Christopher Blauvelt
- Edited by: Affonso Gonçalves
- Music by: Marcelo Zarvos
- Production companies: Gloria Sanchez Productions; MountainA; Killer Films; Taylor & Dodge; Project Infinity
- Distributed by: Netflix
- Release dates: May 20, 2023 (Cannes); November 17, 2023 (United States)
- Running time: 117 minutes
- Country: United States
- Language: English
- Budget: $20 million
- Box office: $5.3 million

May December is a 2023 American comedy drama film directed by Todd Haynes from a screenplay by Samy Burch, based on a story by Burch and Alex Mechanik. It stars Natalie Portman as an actress who travels to meet and study the life of Gracie (Julianne Moore), a sex offender she is set to play in a film. Gracie has been in a 24-year relationship with her husband Joe (Charles Melton), which began when he was 13 years old and she was 36.

While not a direct adaptation, the film mirrors the Mary Kay Letourneau scandal.

The film was announced in June 2021, with Portman and Moore joining the cast. Filmed in 23 days in mid-2022 in Savannah, Georgia, it premiered at the 76th Cannes Film Festival on May 20, 2023, where Netflix acquired the North American distribution rights.

May December had a limited theatrical release in the United States on November 17, 2023, before streaming on Netflix on December 1, 2023. It received critical acclaim and accolades, including four nominations at the 81st Golden Globe Awards and a Best Original Screenplay nomination at the 96th Academy Awards, and was chosen by the American Film Institute as one of the top ten films of 2023.

== Plot ==
In 2015, actress Elizabeth Berry arrives in Savannah, Georgia, to research her upcoming role in an independent film. Elizabeth will be playing Gracie Atherton-Yoo, who, in 1992 at the age of 36, was caught raping 13-year-old Joe Yoo, a schoolmate of her son Georgie, at the pet store where they both worked. During a prison sentence, Gracie gave birth to Joe's child. Twenty-three years later, Gracie and Joe are married with three children: Honor, who is at college and twins Charlie and Mary, who are about to graduate from high school.

Elizabeth interviews Gracie and Joe about their relationship. Visiting the pet store where the couple met, Elizabeth sees the stock room where Gracie and Joe were caught having sex and reenacts the scene alone. She speaks with Tom, Gracie's first husband; Georgie, who is now a musician; and Gracie's defense lawyer. They view Gracie in varying ways, depicting her as naïve and passive, but also show how destructive her actions were.

Joe engages in a private text conversation with an unnamed friend who shares his hobby of rearing monarch butterflies. At one point, he proposes they take a vacation together, but she rebuffs him by reminding him he is married. At the accommodation she is staying in, Elizabeth talks with the film's director and suggests the film cast a "sexier" actor for the 13-year-old character of Joe after she views auditions of prospective co-stars.

Elizabeth participates in a Q&A at the twins' high school and discusses the intimacy actors and crew members feel when shooting a sex scene. When Elizabeth says she enjoys playing morally ambiguous characters, Mary is visibly offended.

At home, Charlie shares a cannabis joint with Joe, who reveals to his son that he has never tried cannabis before. High, Joe has a breakdown and weeps in Charlie's arms.

The family, accompanied by Elizabeth, celebrate the twins' graduation at a restaurant, where they have an awkward encounter with Tom, Georgie, and the rest of Gracie's old family. Georgie proposes that Elizabeth get him a job as a music supervisor on the film in exchange for details about Gracie's life; he claims he read Gracie's diary and discovered that her older brothers sexually abused her. Georgie also threatens that if not given the job, he will disparage the film to the press when it is released. Elizabeth gets a ride home from Joe.

Elizabeth invites Joe to her accommodation, where he gives her a letter Gracie wrote him when he was young. Elizabeth tells Joe that he still has time to start a new life, after which they have sex. Joe leaves after she refers to his experiences as a "story," saying that story is "his life." Elizabeth then reads aloud the letter Joe gave her, adapting Gracie's mannerisms and lisps as she does so. Joe tearfully confronts Gracie about their relationship, wondering whether he was "too young." Gracie insists he seduced her and repeatedly asks who was really in control.

The morning of graduation, one of Joe's butterflies emerges from its chrysalis. Later, the whole family watches Charlie and Mary graduate while Joe weeps alone in the crowd. As Elizabeth prepares to leave, Gracie tells her Georgie fabricated the story of abuse by her brothers.

On set of the film, Elizabeth films multiple takes of a scene depicting Gracie seducing Joe at the pet store. While the director is satisfied, she asks to film another take, insisting that the scene is "getting more real".

== Cast ==
- Natalie Portman as Elizabeth Berry, an actress
- Julianne Moore as Gracie Atherton-Yoo
- Charles Melton as Joe Yoo
- Cory Michael Smith as Georgie Atherton, Gracie's eldest son
- Elizabeth Yu as Mary Atherton-Yoo, Gracie & Joe's daughter
- Gabriel Chung as Charlie Atherton-Yoo, Gracie & Joe's son
- Piper Curda as Honor Atherton-Yoo, Gracie & Joe's oldest daughter
- D. W. Moffett as Tom Atherton, Gracie's ex-husband, Georgie's dad
- Lawrence Arancio as Morris Sperber

== Production ==
Screenwriter Samy Burch outlined the script with her husband, Alex Mechanik, and completed the screenplay on Memorial Day, 2019. Producer Jessica Elbaum came onboard after reading the screenplay. In June 2021, it was announced that Portman and Moore were cast in the film. Portman recruited Todd Haynes to direct. In September 2022, Melton joined the cast. In January 2023, it was reported that Piper Curda, Elizabeth Yu, and Gabriel Chung had joined the cast.

Principal photography took place in Savannah, Georgia, and wrapped after 23 days in November 2022. Haynes's longtime collaborator Edward Lachman was initially going to serve as cinematographer, but was replaced by Christopher Blauvelt after injuring his hip. The script, which is set in Savannah, was originally set in Camden, Maine.

Haynes said the film is partly inspired by the Ingmar Bergman films Persona (1966) and Winter Light (1963). While not a direct adaptation, he also stated that the Mary Kay Letourneau scandal "became very, very helpful to get very specific about the research, and we learned things from that relationship".

== Music ==
Marcelo Zarvos's score for the film is an adaptation and reorchestration of Michel Legrand's music for The Go-Between. Haynes originally played Legrand's score on set and during editing for inspiration until eventually the team "ended up embracing so many aspects of the original score that Marcelo adapted and added original music to it and then re-orchestrated it." Legrand was credited along with Zarvos.

== Release ==
In February 2023, Sky Cinema acquired the UK distribution rights. The film was selected to compete for the Palme d'Or at the 76th Cannes Film Festival, where it premiered on May 20, 2023. Shortly after its Cannes premiere, Netflix acquired North American distribution rights to the film for $11 million. The film also screened as the "Opening Night Film" at the 2023 New York Film Festival on September 29.

The film was released in select U.S. theaters on November 17, 2023, before streaming on Netflix in the U.S. and Canada on December 1. It was released by Sky Cinema in the United Kingdom on December 8.

== Reception ==
=== Critical response ===
May December received critical acclaim. (Note: Attributed to multiple references:) On the review aggregator website Rotten Tomatoes, 91% of 325 critics' reviews are positive, with an average rating of 7.8/10. The website's consensus reads: "Swaddling its difficult fact-based story in a blanket of campy humor, May December is a seductively discomfiting watch." Metacritic, which uses a weighted average, assigned the film a score of 86 out of 100, based on 53 critics, indicating "universal acclaim".

In his review following its Cannes premiere, Peter Debruge of Variety called May December an "endlessly fascinating movie" and added, "As layered and infinitely open-to-interpretation as any of [Haynes's] films, it's also the most generous and direct [...] The potential for passion, transformation and subversion hangs heavy in the air". David Ehrlich of IndieWire called the film "a heartbreakingly sincere piece of high camp that teases real human drama from the stuff of tabloid sensationalism", and praised Melton's "well-modulated and eventually rather moving performance" and Moore's "predictably sensational, soft-hard performance". The Guardian's Peter Bradshaw found the film "amusing and elegant [...] delivered with a cool, shrewd precision by Todd Haynes" and described Portman and Moore's performances as containing "a potent frenmity".

Bilge Ebiri of Vulture called May December "very funny and light on its feet, but also a deeply uncomfortable movie", writing that Haynes "uses the trappings of camp to draw attention to the disconnect between what's happening onscreen and our response to it", and concluding: "It feels at times like the director himself [is] looking for the right tone with which to tell this story. He doesn't know exactly how to feel about all this. So he feels all the things, and makes sure we do, too."

Rolling Stone's CT Jones praised Melton's performance, noting his skill and physicality in the role. "It's an inscrutable well of interpersonal grievances, power imbalances, and history, a perfect breeding ground for sharp work from screen icons Portman and Moore, the latter in her fifth film with Haynes," they wrote. "But while the two are competing to see how much cringe and humor one can conceivably fit into a movie about sexual assault and grooming, there's Melton off to the side, quietly stealing the show."

Carlos Boyero of El País wrote that Todd Haynes's approach to telling the story "makes it petty, and pointlessly pretentious".

Filmmakers Robert Eggers, Kitty Green, Bill Hader, Don Hertzfeldt, Laurel Parmet and Jeff Rowe cited May December as among their favorite films of 2023.

In discussing the film, Portman described the dynamic between Elizabeth and Gracie as having an "inherent queerness," explaining that "a lot of queerness" involves "stepping out of prescribed societal boundaries" and creating one's own identity and story. She said the characters' relationship explores themes of performance, identity, and control over personal narratives.

=== Accolades ===
May December was ranked tenth in Sight and Sound's list of the 50 best films of 2023, out of 363 films nominated by 106 British and international participants. In France, Cahiers du Cinéma placed it second on their top 10 films of 2024. Some critics noted the omission of acting nominations for Portman, Melton and Moore at the 96th Academy Awards, despite being nominated at other major awards associations. EJ Dickson of Rolling Stone claimed Melton's omission continued a pattern of the Academy excluding actors aged under 40 and of Asian descent.

Award / Film Festival	Date of ceremony	Category	Recipient(s)	Result	Ref.
AACTA International Awards	February 10, 2024	Best International Supporting Actress	Julianne Moore	Nominated	
AARP Movies for Grownups Awards	January 17, 2024	Best Supporting Actress	Julianne Moore	Nominated	
Academy Awards	March 10, 2024	Best Original Screenplay	Samy Burch, Alex Mechanik	Nominated	
American Film Institute	December 7, 2023	Top 10 Films	May December	Won (Note: Shared with American Fiction, Barbie, The Holdovers, Killers of the Flower Moon, Maestro, Oppenheimer, Past Lives, Poor Things, and Spider-Man: Across the Spider-Verse)	
Alliance of Women Film Journalists	January 3, 2024	Best Actor in a Supporting Role	Charles Melton	Nominated	
Alliance of Women Film Journalists	January 3, 2024	Best Screenplay, Original	Samy Burch	Nominated	
Alliance of Women Film Journalists	January 3, 2024	Best Woman Screenwriter	Samy Burch	Nominated	
Alliance of Women Film Journalists	January 3, 2024	Grand Dame Award for Defying Agism	Julianne Moore	Nominated	
Alliance of Women Film Journalists	January 3, 2024	Most Daring Performance	Julianne Moore	Nominated	
Artios Awards	March 7, 2024	Outstanding Achievement in Casting – Feature Studio or Independent (Drama)	Laura Rosenthal, Meagan Lewis, Rebecca Carfagna, Kimberly Ostroy	Nominated	
Astra Film and Creative Arts Awards	January 6, 2024	Best Supporting Actress	Julianne Moore	Nominated	
Astra Film and Creative Arts Awards	January 6, 2024	Best Supporting Actor	Charles Melton	Nominated	
Austin Film Critics Association	January 10, 2024	Best Supporting Actor	Charles Melton	Nominated	
Austin Film Critics Association	January 10, 2024	Best Supporting Actress	Julianne Moore	Nominated	
Austin Film Critics Association	January 10, 2024	Best Original Screenplay	Samy Burch and Alex Mechanik	Nominated	
Boston Society of Film Critics	December 10, 2023	Best Film	May December	Runner-up (Note: Shared with The Zone of Interest.)	
Boston Society of Film Critics	December 10, 2023	Best Director	Todd Haynes	Runner-up (Note: Shared with Christopher Nolan for Oppenheimer.)	
Boston Society of Film Critics	December 10, 2023	Best Actress	Natalie Portman	Runner-up (Note: Shared with Emma Stone for Poor Things and Sandra Hüller for Anatomy of a Fall.)	
Boston Society of Film Critics	December 10, 2023	Best Supporting Actor	Charles Melton	Runner-up (Note: Shared with Mark Ruffalo for Poor Things and Robert Downey Jr. for Oppenheimer.)	
Boston Society of Film Critics	December 10, 2023	Best Original Screenplay	Samy Burch	Runner-up (Note: Shared with Nicole Holofcener for You Hurt My Feelings.)	
Cannes Film Festival	May 27, 2023	Palme d'Or	Todd Haynes	Nominated	
Capri Hollywood International Film Festival	January 2, 2024	Breakthrough Actor	Charles Melton	Won	
Celebration of Cinema & Television	December 4, 2023	Breakthrough Performance Award	Charles Melton	Won	
Chicago Film Critics Association	December 12, 2023	Best Picture	Jessica Elbaum, Will Ferrell, Grant S. Johnson, Pamela Koffler, Tyler W. Konney, Sophie Mas, Natalie Portman, Christine Vachon	Nominated	
Chicago Film Critics Association	December 12, 2023	Best Director	Todd Haynes	Nominated	
Chicago Film Critics Association	December 12, 2023	Best Actress	Natalie Portman	Nominated	
Chicago Film Critics Association	December 12, 2023	Best Supporting Actor	Charles Melton	Won	
Chicago Film Critics Association	December 12, 2023	Best Supporting Actress	Julianne Moore	Nominated	
Chicago Film Critics Association	December 12, 2023	Best Original Screenplay	Samy Burch	Won	
Chicago Film Critics Association	December 12, 2023	Most Promising Performer	Charles Melton	Won	
Critics' Choice Movie Awards	January 14, 2024	Best Supporting Actor	Charles Melton	Nominated	
Critics' Choice Movie Awards	January 14, 2024	Best Supporting Actress	Julianne Moore	Nominated	
Critics' Choice Movie Awards	January 14, 2024	Best Original Screenplay	Samy Burch	Nominated	
Costume Designers Guild Awards	February 21, 2024	Excellence in Contemporary Film	April Napier	Nominated	
Dallas–Fort Worth Film Critics Association	December 18, 2023	Best Film	May December	10th Place	
Dallas–Fort Worth Film Critics Association	December 18, 2023	Best Supporting Actor	Charles Melton	2nd Place	
Dallas–Fort Worth Film Critics Association	December 18, 2023	Best Supporting Actress	Julianne Moore	5th Place	
Dublin Film Critics Circle	December 19, 2023	Best Film	May December	5th Place	
Dublin Film Critics Circle	December 19, 2023	Best Actor	Charles Melton	9th Place	
Dublin Film Critics Circle	December 19, 2023	Best Actress	Julianne Moore	5th Place	
Dublin Film Critics Circle	December 19, 2023	Best Actress	Natalie Portman	6th Place	
Dublin Film Critics Circle	December 19, 2023	Best Screenplay	Samy Burch	3rd Place	
Florida Film Critics Circle	December 21, 2023	Best Picture	May December	Runner-up	
Florida Film Critics Circle	December 21, 2023	Best Director	Todd Haynes	Won	
Florida Film Critics Circle	December 21, 2023	Best Actress	Natalie Portman	Nominated	
Florida Film Critics Circle	December 21, 2023	Best Supporting Actor	Charles Melton	Won	
Florida Film Critics Circle	December 21, 2023	Breakout Award	Charles Melton	Runner-up	
Florida Film Critics Circle	December 21, 2023	Best Supporting Actress	Julianne Moore	Nominated	
Florida Film Critics Circle	December 21, 2023	Best Original Screenplay	Samy Burch	Nominated	
Florida Film Critics Circle	December 21, 2023	Golden Orange	Alex Mechanik	Runner-up	
Georgia Film Critics Association	January 5, 2024	Best Picture	May December	Nominated	
Georgia Film Critics Association	January 5, 2024	Best Supporting Actor	Charles Melton	Runner-up	
Georgia Film Critics Association	January 5, 2024	Best Original Screenplay	Samy Burch	Nominated	
Georgia Film Critics Association	January 5, 2024	Oglethorpe Award for Excellence in Georgia Cinema	Todd Haynes and Samy Burch	Won	
Golden Globe Awards	January 7, 2024	Best Motion Picture – Musical or Comedy	May December	Nominated	
Golden Globe Awards	January 7, 2024	Best Actress – Motion Picture Musical or Comedy	Natalie Portman	Nominated	
Golden Globe Awards	January 7, 2024	Best Supporting Actor – Motion Picture	Charles Melton	Nominated	
Golden Globe Awards	January 7, 2024	Best Supporting Actress – Motion Picture	Julianne Moore	Nominated	
Gotham Awards	November 27, 2023	Best Screenplay	Samy Burch and Alex Mechanik	Nominated	
Gotham Awards	November 27, 2023	Outstanding Supporting Performance	Charles Melton	Won	
Greater Western New York Film Critics Association	January 6, 2024	Best Picture	May December	Nominated	
Greater Western New York Film Critics Association	January 6, 2024	Best Director	Todd Haynes	Nominated	
Greater Western New York Film Critics Association	January 6, 2024	Best Lead Actress	Natalie Portman	Nominated	
Greater Western New York Film Critics Association	January 6, 2024	Best Supporting Actor	Charles Melton	Won	
Greater Western New York Film Critics Association	January 6, 2024	Breakthrough Performance	Charles Melton	Won	
Greater Western New York Film Critics Association	January 6, 2024	Best Original Screenplay	Samy Burch and Alex Mechanik	Nominated	
Independent Spirit Awards	February 25, 2024	Best Film	Jessica Elbaum, Will Ferrell, Grant S. Johnson, Pamela Koffler, Tyler W. Konney, Sophie Mas, Natalie Portman, Christine Vachon	Nominated	
Independent Spirit Awards	February 25, 2024	Best Director	Todd Haynes	Nominated	
Independent Spirit Awards	February 25, 2024	Best Lead Performance	Natalie Portman	Nominated	
Independent Spirit Awards	February 25, 2024	Best Supporting Performance	Charles Melton	Nominated	
Independent Spirit Awards	February 25, 2024	Best First Screenplay	Samy Burch & Alex Mechanik	Won	
IndieWire Critics Poll	December 11, 2023	Best Film	May December	5th Place	
IndieWire Critics Poll	December 11, 2023	Best Director	Todd Haynes	5th Place	
IndieWire Critics Poll	December 11, 2023	Best Performance	Charles Melton	5th Place	
IndieWire Critics Poll	December 11, 2023	Best Screenplay	Samy Burch	1st Place	
Los Angeles Film Critics Association	December 10, 2023	Best Screenplay	Samy Burch	Runner-up	
Middleburg Film Festival	October 22, 2023	Visionary Director Award	Todd Haynes	Won	
Mill Valley Film Festival	October 16, 2023	Lifetime Achievement: Collaboration	Todd Haynes and Christine Vachon	Won	
Montclair Film Festival	October 30, 2023	Director Award	Todd Haynes	Won	
National Society of Film Critics	January 6, 2024	Best Director	Todd Haynes	2nd Place (Note: Tied with Christopher Nolan for Oppenheimer.)	
National Society of Film Critics	January 6, 2024	Best Supporting Actor	Charles Melton	Won	
National Society of Film Critics	January 6, 2024	Best Screenplay	Samy Burch	Won	
New York Film Critics Circle	November 30, 2023	Best Supporting Actor	Charles Melton	Won	
New York Film Critics Circle	November 30, 2023	Best Screenplay	Samy Burch	Won	
New York Film Critics Online	December 15, 2023	Top 10 Films	May December	Won (Note: Presented to multiple films.)	
New York Film Critics Online	December 15, 2023	Breakthrough Performer	Charles Melton	Won	
People's Choice Awards	February 18, 2024	The Movie Performance of the Year	Charles Melton	Nominated	
People's Choice Awards	February 18, 2024	The Movie Performance of the Year	Natalie Portman	Nominated	
San Diego Film Critics Society	December 19, 2023	Best Supporting Actor	Charles Melton	Nominated	
San Diego Film Critics Society	December 19, 2023	Best Supporting Actress	Julianne Moore	Nominated	
San Diego Film Critics Society	December 19, 2023	Best Original Screenplay	Samy Burch	Nominated	
San Francisco Bay Area Film Critics Circle	January 9, 2024	Best Supporting Actor	Charles Melton	Nominated	
San Francisco Bay Area Film Critics Circle	January 9, 2024	Best Original Screenplay	Samy Burch	Nominated	
Santa Barbara International Film Festival	February 10, 2024	Virtuoso Award	Charles Melton	Won	
Satellite Awards	February 18, 2024	Best Motion Picture – Drama	May December	Nominated	
Satellite Awards	February 18, 2024	Best Actress in a Motion Picture – Drama	Natalie Portman	Nominated	
Satellite Awards	February 18, 2024	Best Actor in a Supporting Role	Charles Melton	Nominated	
Satellite Awards	February 18, 2024	Best Actress in a Supporting Role	Julianne Moore	Nominated	
Satellite Awards	February 18, 2024	Best Original Screenplay	Samy Burch	Nominated	
Seattle Film Critics Society	January 8, 2024	Best Picture of the Year	May December	Nominated	
Seattle Film Critics Society	January 8, 2024	Best Actor in a Supporting Role	Charles Melton	Won	
Seattle Film Critics Society	January 8, 2024	Best Screenplay	Samy Burch	Nominated	
Set Decorators Society of America Awards	February 13, 2024	Best Achievement in Décor/Design of a Contemporary Feature Film	Jess Royal and Sam Lisenco	Nominated	
St. Louis Film Critics Association	December 17, 2023	Best Film	May December	Nominated	
St. Louis Film Critics Association	December 17, 2023	Best Director	Todd Haynes	Nominated	
St. Louis Film Critics Association	December 17, 2023	Best Actress	Natalie Portman	Nominated	
St. Louis Film Critics Association	December 17, 2023	Best Supporting Actor	Charles Melton	Runner-up	
St. Louis Film Critics Association	December 17, 2023	Best Supporting Actress	Julianne Moore	Nominated	
St. Louis Film Critics Association	December 17, 2023	Best Score	Marcelo Zarvos	Runner-up	
Toronto Film Critics Association	December 17, 2023	Best Supporting Performance	Charles Melton	Runner-up (Note: Shared with Robert De Niro for Killers of the Flower Moon, Robert Downey Jr. for Oppenheimer, and Glenn Howerton and BlackBerry.)	
Toronto Film Critics Association	December 17, 2023	Best Breakthrough Performance	Charles Melton	Runner-up (Note: Shared with Dominic Sessa for The Holdovers.)	
Variety & Golden Globe's Breakthrough Artist Awards	May 19, 2023	Breakthrough Artist Award	Charles Melton	Honoree	
Washington D.C. Area Film Critics Association Awards	December 10, 2023	Best Supporting Actor	Charles Melton	Won	
Women Film Critics Circle	December 18, 2023	Best Actor	Charles Melton	Runner-up	
Women Film Critics Circle	December 18, 2023	Best Supporting Actress	Julianne Moore	Runner-up	
Writers Guild of America Awards	April 14, 2024	Best Original Screenplay	Samy Burch	Nominated	
