= Toronto Film Critics Association Award for Best Supporting Actress =

Canadian film award

- Awarded for: Best Performance by an Actress in a Supporting Role
- Presented by: Toronto Film Critics Association
- First award: 2000
- Last Winner: Keke Palmer, Nope (2022)

The Toronto Film Critics Association Award for Best Supporting Actress was one of the annual awards given by the Toronto Film Critics Association. It and Toronto Film Critics Association Award for Best Supporting Actor were combined into Toronto Film Critics Association Award for Outstanding Supporting Performance in 2023.

== Winners ==
=== 2000s ===
Year	Winner	Film	Role	Ref
2000	Zhang Ziyi	Crouching Tiger, Hidden Dragon (Wo hu cang long)	Jen Yu	
2000	Ellen Burstyn	Requiem for a Dream	Sara Goldfarb	
2001	Scarlett Johansson	Ghost World	Rebecca	
2001	Laura Linney	The House of Mirth	Bertha Dorset	
2001	Gwyneth Paltrow	The Royal Tenenbaums	Margot Tenenbaum	
2002	Emily Watson	Punch-Drunk Love	Lena Leonard	
2002	Kathy Bates	About Schmidt	Roberta Hertzel	
2002	Toni Collette	About a Boy	Fiona Brewer	
2003	Miranda Richardson	Spider	Yvonne / Mrs. Cleg	
2004	Virginia Madsen	Sideways	Maya Randall	
2005	Catherine Keener	Capote	Nelle Harper Lee	
2006	Cate Blanchett	Notes on a Scandal	Sheba Hart	
2006	Jennifer Hudson	Dreamgirls	Effie White	
2006	Rinko Kikuchi	Babel	Chieko Wataya	
2007	Cate Blanchett	I'm Not There	Jude Quinn	
2007	Amy Ryan	Gone Baby Gone	Helene McCready	
2007	Tilda Swinton	Michael Clayton	Karen Crowder	
2008	Rosemarie DeWitt	Rachel Getting Married	Rachel Buchman	
2008	Penélope Cruz	Vicky Cristina Barcelona	María Elena	
2008	Viola Davis	Doubt	Mrs. Miller	
2009	Anna Kendrick	Up in the Air	Natalie Keener	
2009	Vera Farmiga	Up in the Air	Alex Goran	
2009	Mo'Nique	Precious	Mary Lee Johnston	

=== 2010s ===
Year	Winner	Film	Role	Ref
2010	Hailee Steinfeld	True Grit	Mattie Ross	
2010	Amy Adams	The Fighter	Charlene Fleming	
2010	Melissa Leo	The Fighter	Alice Eklund	
2011	Jessica Chastain	Take Shelter	Samantha LaForche	
2011	Jessica Chastain	The Tree of Life	Mrs. O'Brien	
2011	Shailene Woodley	The Descendants	Alexandra King	
2012	Gina Gershon	Killer Joe	Sharla Smith	
2012	Amy Adams	The Master	Peggy Dodd	
2012	Ann Dowd	Compliance	Sandra	
2012	Anne Hathaway	Les Misérables	Fantine	
2013	Jennifer Lawrence	American Hustle	Rosalyn Rosenfeld	
2013	Lupita Nyong'o	12 Years a Slave	Patsey	
2013	June Squibb	Nebraska	Kate Grant	
2014	Patricia Arquette	Boyhood	Olivia Evans	
2014	Tilda Swinton	Snowpiercer	Deputy-Minister Mason	
2014	Katherine Waterston	Inherent Vice	Shasta Fay Hepworth	
2015	Alicia Vikander	Ex Machina	Ava	
2015	Rooney Mara	Carol	Therese Belivet	
2015	Kristen Stewart	Clouds of Sils Maria	Valentine	
2016	Michelle Williams	Manchester by the Sea	Randi Chandler	
2016	Viola Davis	Fences	Rose Maxson	
2016	Naomie Harris	Moonlight	Paula Harris	
2017	Laurie Metcalf	Lady Bird	Marion McPherson	
2017	Allison Janney	I, Tonya	LaVona Golden	
2017	Lesley Manville	Phantom Thread	Cyril Woodcock	
2018	Regina King	If Beale Street Could Talk	Sharon Rivers	
2018	Emma Stone	The Favourite	Abigail Masham	
2018	Rachel Weisz	The Favourite	Sarah Churchill	
2019	Laura Dern	Marriage Story	Nora Fanshaw	
2019	Julia Fox	Uncut Gems	Julia Holmes	
2019	Florence Pugh	Little Women	Amy March	

=== 2020s ===
Year	Winner	Film	Role	Ref
2020	Maria Bakalova	Borat Subsequent Moviefilm	Tutar Sagdiyev	
2020	Olivia Colman	The Father	Anne	
2020	Youn Yuh-jung	Minari	Soon-ja	
2021	Jessie Buckley	The Lost Daughter	Young Leda Caruso	
2021	Kirsten Dunst	The Power of the Dog	Rose Gordon	
2021	Ruth Negga	Passing	Clare Bellew	
2022	Keke Palmer	Nope	Emerald "Em" Haywood	
2022	Jessie Buckley	Women Talking	Mariche	
2022	Stephanie Hsu	Everything Everywhere All at Once	Joy Wang / Jobu Tupaki	
