= Toronto Film Critics Association Award for Outstanding Supporting Performance =

Award given annually by the Toronto Film Critics Association

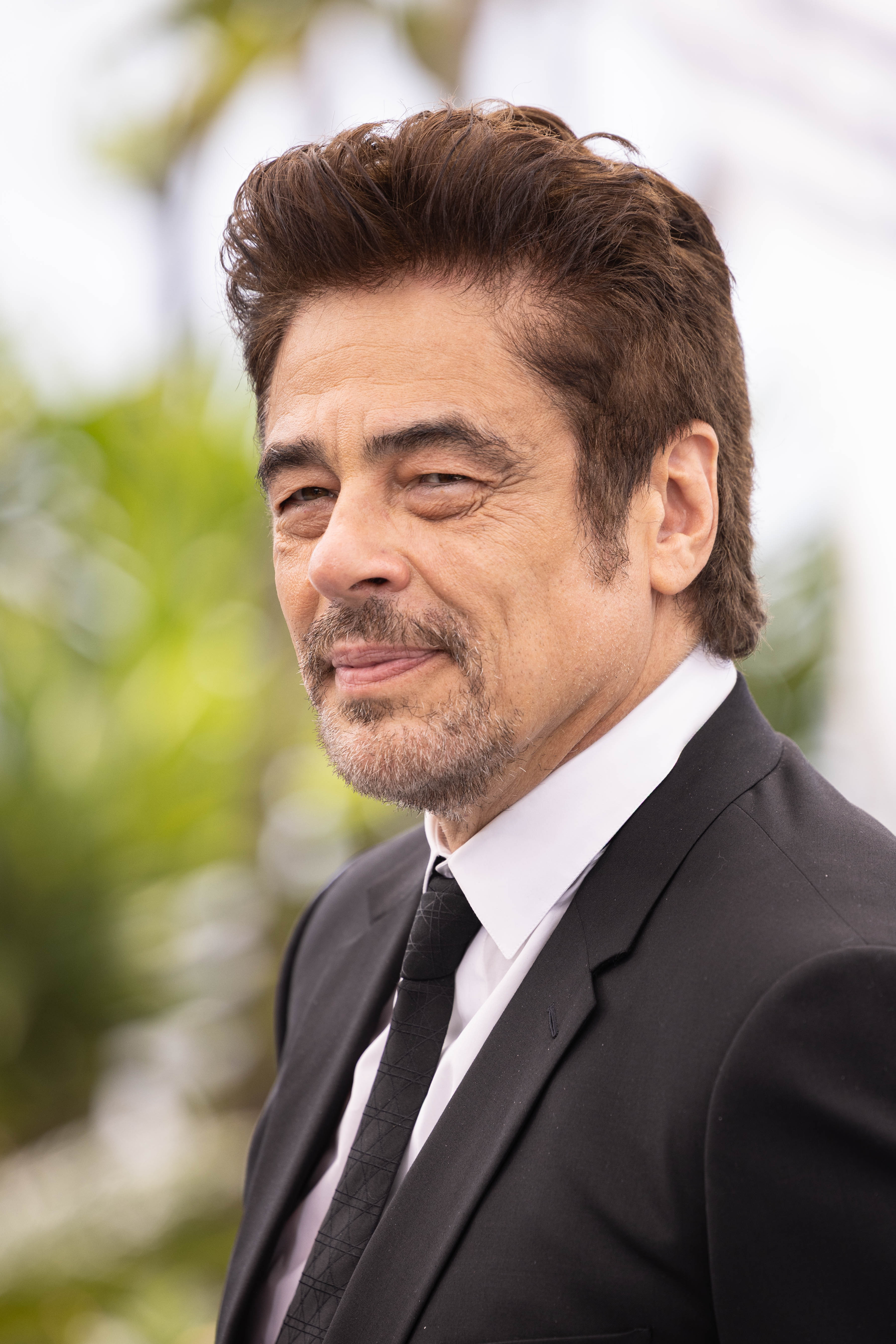
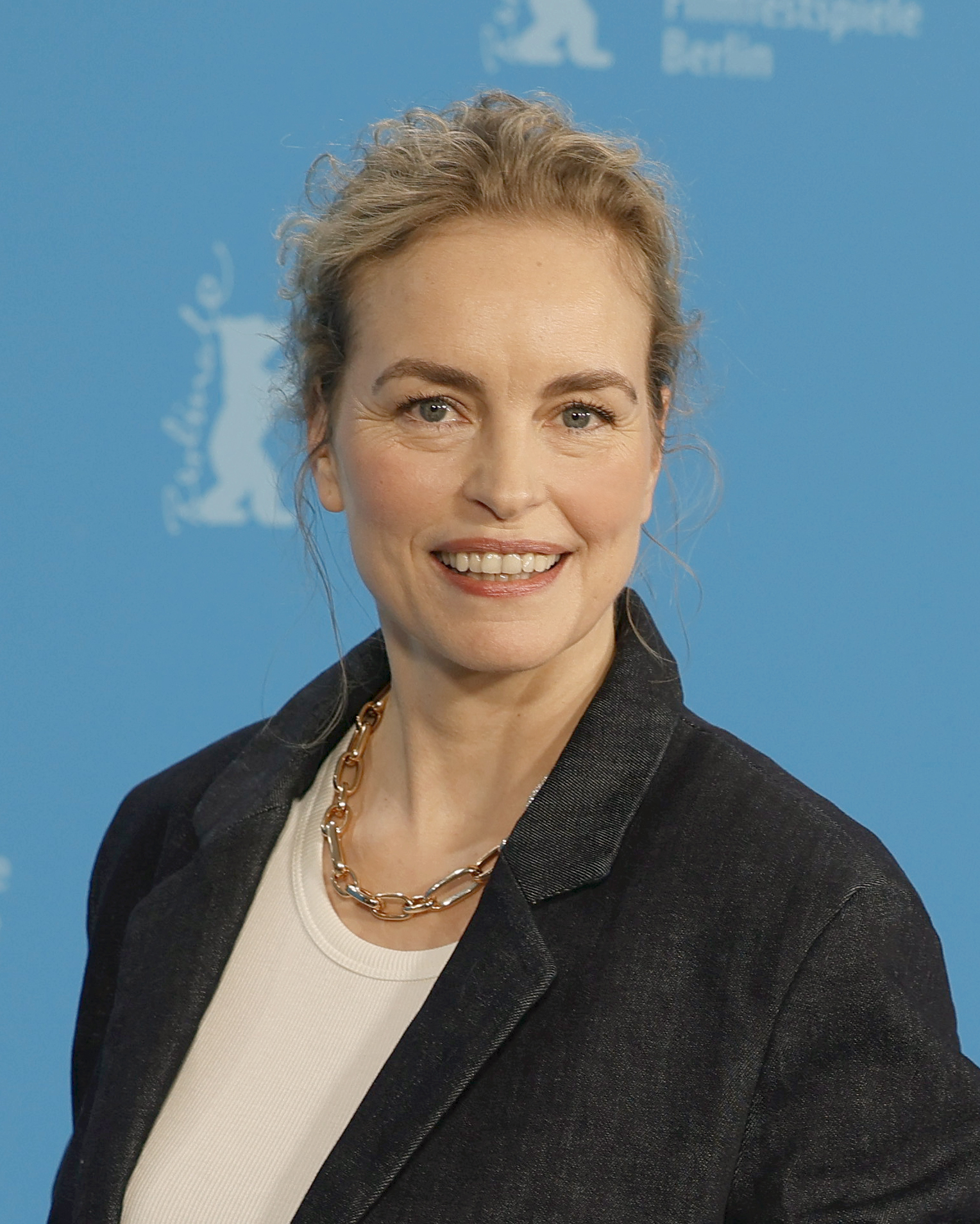
- The 2025 recipients: Benicio del Toro (left) and Nina Hoss (right)
- Awarded for: Outstanding Performance by an Actor or an Actress in a Supporting Role
- Country: Canada
- Presented by: Toronto Film Critics Association
- Currently held by: Benicio del Toro – One Battle After Another; Nina Hoss – Hedda (2025)
- Website: torontofilmcritics.com

The Toronto Film Critics Association Award for Outstanding Supporting Performance is one of the annual awards given by the Toronto Film Critics Association. It was presented for the first time in 2023, after the TFCA announced that it was merging its former awards for Best Supporting Actor and Best Supporting Actress into a single gender-neutral category.

== Winners and runners-up ==
=== 2020s ===
Year	Winner	Film	Role	Ref
2023	Ryan Gosling	Barbie	Ken	
2023	Da'Vine Joy Randolph	The Holdovers	Mary Lamb	
2023	Robert De Niro	Killers of the Flower Moon	William King Hale	
2023	Robert Downey Jr.	Oppenheimer	Lewis Strauss	
2023	Glenn Howerton	BlackBerry	Jim Balsillie	
2023	Charles Melton	May December	Joe Yoo	
2024	Yura Borisov	Anora	Igor	
2024	Kieran Culkin	A Real Pain	Benji Kaplan	
2024	Clarence Maclin	Sing Sing	Himself	
2024	Zoe Saldaña	Emilia Pérez	Rita Mora Castro	
2024	Jeremy Strong	The Apprentice	Roy Cohn	
2024	Denzel Washington	Gladiator II	Macrinus	
2025	Benicio del Toro	One Battle After Another	Sergio St Carlos	
2025	Nina Hoss	Hedda	Eileen Lovborg	
2025	Jacob Elordi	Frankenstein	The Creature	
2025	Amy Madigan	Weapons	Gladys	
2025	Sean Penn	One Battle After Another	Steven J Lockjaw	
2025	Stellan Skarsgard	Sentimental Value	Gustav Borg	
