= 8th Critics' Choice Documentary Awards =

- Date: November 12, 2023
- Site: Edison Ballroom, New York City, United States
- Hosted by: Wyatt Cenac
- Most wins: Still: A Michael J. Fox Movie (5)
- Most nominations: American Symphony (6)

Television/radio coverage
- Network: Facebook Live; YouTube; X

The 8th Critics' Choice Documentary Awards, presented by the Critics Choice Association, were held on November 12, 2023, at the Edison Ballroom in New York City, to honor finest achievements in documentary filmmaking and non-fiction television.

The ceremony was hosted by American comedian Wyatt Cenac for the second year in a row and, broadcast live on Facebook Live, YouTube and X.

The nominations were announced on October 16, 2023. Matthew Heineman's American Symphony led the nominations with six, followed by Still: A Michael J. Fox Movie, Kokomo City, and 20 Days in Mariupol, with five nominations each. The category for Best True Crime Documentary was introduced.

American documentary filmmaker Ross McElwee was honored with the Pennebaker Award (Lifetime Achievement Award). Still: A Michael J. Fox Movie received the most awards with five wins, including Best Documentary Feature, followed by 20 Days in Mariupol, American Symphony and The Deepest Breath, with two wins each.

== Winners and nominees ==
The nominations were announced on October 16, 2023. Winners are listed first and in bold.

**Best Documentary Feature**: **Still: A Michael J. Fox Movie (Apple TV+)**; 20 Days in Mariupol (PBS); American Symphony (Netflix); Beyond Utopia (Roadside Attractions); The Deepest Breath (Netflix); The Eternal Memory (MTV Documentary Films); Judy Blume Forever (Amazon Studios); Kokomo City (Magnolia Pictures); The Mission (National Geographic); Stamped from the Beginning (Netflix)	**Best Director**: **Still: A Michael J. Fox Movie – Davis Guggenheim (Apple TV+)**; The Eternal Memory – Maite Alberdi (MTV Documentary Films); Beyond Utopia – Madeleine Gavin (Roadside Attractions); American Symphony – Matthew Heineman (Netflix); The Mission – Amanda McBaine, Jesse Moss (National Geographic); Occupied City – Steve McQueen (A24)
**Best First Documentary Feature**: **20 Days in Mariupol (PBS)**; 26.2 to Life (Film Halau); Bad Press (Oklafilm); Bobi Wine: The People's President (National Geographic); Kokomo City (Magnolia Pictures); Orlando, My Political Biography (Sideshow); Smoke Sauna Sisterhood (Greenwich Entertainment); The Thief Collector (FilmRise)	**Best True Crime Documentary**: **Telemarketers (HBO / MAX)**; **John Lennon: Murder Without a Trial (Apple TV+)**; Burden of Proof (HBO / MAX); The Jewel Thief (Hulu); Murdaugh Murders: A Southern Scandal (Netflix); The Thief Collector (FilmRise); Victim/Suspect (Netflix)
**Best Archival Documentary**: **Being Mary Tyler Moore (HBO / MAX)**; The Disappearance of Shere Hite (IFC Films); It Ain't Over (Sony Pictures Classics); JFK: One Day in America (National Geographic); The Lady Bird Diaries (Hulu); The League (Magnolia Pictures)	**Best Biographical Documentary**: **Still: A Michael J. Fox Movie (Apple TV+)**; Being Mary Tyler Moore (HBO / MAX); The Disappearance of Shere Hite (IFC Films); Going to Mars: The Nikki Giovanni Project (HBO Documentary Films); Judy Blume Forever (Amazon Studios); Pretty Baby: Brooke Shields (Hulu); Sly (Netflix)
**Best Political Documentary**: **20 Days in Mariupol (PBS)**; Beyond Utopia (Roadside Attractions); Bobi Wine: The People's President (National Geographic); Deadlocked: How America Shaped the Supreme Court (Showtime); Every Body (Focus Features); Lakota Nation vs. United States (IFC Films); Silver Dollar Road (Amazon MGM Studios)	**Best Sports Documentary**: **The Deepest Breath (Netflix)**; Black Ice (Roadside Attractions); BS High (HBO / MAX); It Ain't Over (Sony Pictures Classics); The League (Magnolia Pictures); Reggie (Amazon Studios); Stephen Curry: Underrated (Apple TV+); Welcome to Wrexham (FX)
**Best Historical Documentary**: **JFK: One Day in America (National Geographic)**; The 1619 Project (Hulu / Onyx Collective); The Lady Bird Diaries (Hulu); Lakota Nation vs. United States (IFC Films); The League (Magnolia Pictures); Occupied City (A24); Stamped from the Beginning (Netflix)	**Best Science/Nature Documentary**: **Secrets of the Elephants (National Geographic)**; 32 Sounds (Abramorama); Between Earth & Sky (PBS); Life on Our Planet (Netflix); Path of the Panther (National Geographic); Poisoned: The Dirty Truth About Your Food (Netflix); Wild Beauty: Mustang Spirit of the West (Gravitas Ventures)
**Best Music Documentary**: **American Symphony (Netflix)**; Carlos (Sony Pictures Classics); Ladies First: A Story of Women in Hip-Hop (Netflix); Little Richard: I Am Everything (Magnolia Pictures / CNN Films); Love to Love You, Donna Summer (HBO / MAX); Taylor Swift: The Eras Tour (AMC Theatres); What the Hell Happened to Blood, Sweat & Tears? (Abramorama)	**Best Short Documentary**: **The Last Repair Shop (Breakwater Studios)**; The ABCs of Book Banning (MTV Documentary Films); The Barber of Little Rock (Story Syndicate); Between Earth & Sky (PBS); Keys to the City (New Yorker); Last Song From Kabul (MTV Documentary Films)
**Best Ongoing Documentary Series**: **30 for 30 (ESPN)**; Frontline (PBS); Murdaugh Murders: A Southern Scandal (Netflix); POV (PBS); Trafficked with Mariana van Zeller (National Geographic); Welcome to Wrexham (FX)	**Best Limited Documentary Series**: **The 1619 Project (Hulu / Onyx Collective)**; Big Vape: The Rise and Fall of Juul (Netflix); Deadlocked: How America Shaped the Supreme Court (Showtime); JFK: One Day in America (National Geographic); John Lennon: Murder Without a Trial (Apple TV+); Secrets of the Elephants (National Geographic); Shiny Happy People (Amazon Studios); Telemarketers (HBO / MAX)
**Best Narration**: **Still: A Michael J. Fox Movie – Written and Performed by Michael J. Fox (Apple TV+)**; 20 Days in Mariupol – Written and Performed by Mstyslav Chernov (PBS); 32 Sounds – Sam Green (Abramorama); The Disappearance of Shere Hite – Written by Nicole Newnham; Performed by Dakota Johnson (IFC Films); John Lennon: Murder Without a Trial – Performed by Kiefer Sutherland (Apple TV+); Secrets of the Elephants – Written by Martin Williams; Performed by Natalie Portman (National Geographic)	**Best Score**: **American Symphony – Jon Batiste (Netflix)**; The Mission – Saunder Jurriaans and Danny Bensi (National Geographic); The Deepest Breath – Nainita Desai (Netflix); The Pigeon Tunnel – Philip Glass (Apple TV+); The Last Repair Shop – Katya Richardson & Kris Bowers (Breakwater Studios); Kokomo City – D. Smith (Magnolia Pictures)
**Best Cinematography**: **The Deepest Breath – Tim Cragg (Netflix)**; American Symphony – Tony Hardmon, Matthew Heineman, Thorsten Thielow (Netflix); Occupied City – Lennert Hillege (A24); Anselm – Franz Lustig (Sideshow); Kokomo City – D. Smith (Magnolia Pictures); Secrets of the Elephants – Toby Strong, James Boon, Bob Poole, Neil Fairlie, Wim Vorster, Joshua Tarr, Pete Allibone, Neil Harvey, Andreas Knausenberger (National Geographic)	**Best Editing**: **Still: A Michael J. Fox Movie – Michael Harte (Apple TV+)**; American Symphony – Sammy Dane, Jim Hession, Matthew Heineman, Fernando Villegas (Netflix); Beyond Utopia – Madeleine Gavin (Roadside Attractions); 20 Days in Mariupol – Michelle Mizner (PBS); Kokomo City – D. Smith (Magnolia Pictures); The Mission – Aaron Wickenden (National Geographic)

=== Pennebaker Award ===
- **Ross McElwee**

== Films with multiple wins and nominations ==
Films with multiple wins
Wins	Film
5	Still: A Michael J. Fox Movie
2	20 Days in Mariupol
2	American Symphony
2	The Deepest Breath

Films with multiple nominations
Nominations	Film
6	American Symphony
5	Still: A Michael J. Fox Movie
5	Kokomo City
5	20 Days in Mariupol
4	The Deepest Breath
4	The Mission
4	Secrets of the Elephants
4	Beyond Utopia
3	Occupied City
3	JFK: One Day in America
3	The League
3	John Lennon: Murder Without a Trial
3	The Disappearance of Shere Hite
2	The Eternal Memory
2	Deadlocked: How America Shaped the Supreme Court
2	Judy Blume Forever
2	Bobi Wine: The People's President
2	The Thief Collector
2	The Lady Bird Diaries
2	It Ain't Over
2	Being Mary Tyler Moore
2	Between Earth & Sky
2	Welcome to Wrexham
2	The Last Repair Shop
2	Murdaugh Murders: A Southern Scandal
2	32 Sounds
2	Telemarketers
2	The 1619 Project
2	Stamped from the Beginning

== See also ==
- 96th Academy Awards
