= 17th Cinema Eye Honors =

- Date: January 12, 2024
- Location: New York Academy of Medicine, East Harlem, New York
- Most nominations: Film: Kokomo City (6); Broadcast: The 1619 Project (3); Nothing Lasts Forever (3)
- Website: cinemaeyehonors.com

The 17th Cinema Eye Honors, destined to recognize outstanding artistry and craft in nonfiction filmmaking of 2023, took place at the New York Academy of Medicine in East Harlem, New York on January 12, 2024.

The broadcasts category nominees as well as the annual shorts list and the Unforgettable honorees were announced on October 19, 2022. The full set of nominations was announced on November 16, 2023. Penelope Spheeris' 1981 documentary about the Los Angeles punk rock scene The Decline of Western Civilization received the Legacy Award.

In the feature film categories, Kokomo City led the nominations with six, followed by 20 Days in Mariupol, 32 Sounds, and The Eternal Memory, with five each. In the broadcast categories, The 1619 Project and Nothing Lasts Forever were the most nominated programs, with three nominations.

== Winners and nominees ==
The winners are listed first and in bold.

=== Feature film ===
| Outstanding Non-Fiction Feature | Outstanding Direction |
|---|---|
| **32 Sounds – Directed by Sam Green; Produced by Josh Penn and Thomas O. Kriegsman**; 20 Days in Mariupol – Directed by Mstyslav Chernov; Produced by Mstyslav Chernov, Michelle Mizner, Raney Aronson Rath and Derl McCrudden; The Eternal Memory – Directed by Maite Alberdi; Produced by Maite Alberti, Juan De Dios Larraín, Pablo Larraín and Rocío Jadue; Four Daughters – Directed by Kaouther Ben Hania; Produced by Nadim Cheikhrouha; Going to Mars: The Nikki Giovanni Project – Directed by Joe Brewster and Michèle Stephenson; Produced by Joe Brewster, Michèle Stephenson and Tommy Oliver; Kokomo City – Directed by D. Smith; D. Smith, Harris Doran and Bill Butler; Still: A Michael J. Fox Movie – Directed by Davis Guggenheim; Produced by Davis Guggenheim, Annetta Marion, Jonathan King and Will Cohen | **The Eternal Memory – Maite Alberdi (TIE)**; **Four Daughters – Kaouther Ben Hania (TIE)**; 32 Sounds – Sam Green; Anselm – Wim Wenders; Kokomo City – D. Smith; Our Body – Claire Simon |
| Outstanding Editing | Outstanding Production |
| **Still: A Michael J. Fox Movie – Michael Harte**; 20 Days in Mariupol – Michelle Mizner; 32 Sounds – Nels Bangerter; The Eternal Memory – Carolina Siraqyan; Fantastic Machine – Mikel Cee Karlsson, Maximilien Van Aertryck and Axel Danielson; Rewind & Play – Alain Gomis | **20 Days in Mariupol – Mstyslav Chernov, Michelle Mizner, Raney Aronson Rath and Derl McCrudden**; American Symphony – Lauren Domino, Matthew Heineman and Joedan Okun; Between the Rains – Samuel Ekomol, Andrew H. Brown and Moses Thursnira; Beyond Utopia – Jana Edelbaum, Rachel Cohen and Sue Mi Terry; Bobi Wine: The People's President – Christopher Sharp and John Battsek; Songs of Earth – Margreth Olin |
| Outstanding Cinematography | Outstanding Original Score |
| **Smoke Sauna Sisterhood – Ants Tammik**; Kokomo City – D. Smith; De Humani Corporis Fabrica – Véréna Paravel and Lucien Castaing-Taylor; Anselm – Franz Lustig; Songs of Earth – Lars Erlend Tubaas Øymo; King Coal – Curren Sheldon | **32 Sounds – JD Samson**; Anselm – Leonard Küßner; American Symphony – Jon Batiste; Songs of Earth – Rebekka Karijord; Going to Mars: The Nikki Giovanni Project – Samora Pinderhughes and Chris Pattishall; The Pigeon Tunnel – Philip Glass and Paul Leonard-Morgan |
| Outstanding Sound Design | Outstanding Visual Design |
| **32 Sounds – Mark Mangini**; Kokomo City – Roni Pillischer; De Humani Corporis Fabrica – Nicolas Becker; Smoke Sauna Sisterhood – Huldar Freyr Arnarson and Edvard Egilsson; The Deepest Breath – Adam Prescod, Greg Gettens and Will Chapman; The Tuba Thieves – Arturo "Frosty" Salazar, María Alejandra Rojas and Alison O'Daniel | **Going to Mars: The Nikki Giovanni Project – Thomas Curtis and Sean Pierce**; The Arc of Oblivion – Melissa McClung; The Mission – Jason Carpenter and Holly Stone; Nam June Paik: Moon is the Oldest TV – Hyung Cho and Helen Niu; They Shot the Piano Player – Juan Carlos Concha Riveros, Carlos León Sancha and Marcello Quintanilha |
| Outstanding Debut | Outstanding Non-Fiction Short |
| **Kokomo City – Directed by D. Smith**; 20 Days in Mariupol – Directed by Mstyslav Chernov; Bobi Wine: The People's President – Directed by Moses Bwayo and Christopher Sharp; Smoke Sauna Sisterhood – Directed by Anna Hints; The Tuba Thieves – Directed by Alison O'Daniel; Orlando, My Political Biography – Directed by Paul B. Preciado | **Black Girls Play: The Story of Hand Games – Directed by Joe Brewster and Michèle Stephenson**; Away – Directed by Ruslan Fedotow; Between Earth and Sky – Directed by Andrew Nadkami; Neighbour Abdi – Directed by Douwe Dijkstra; Will You Look at Me – Directed by Shuli Huang |
| Spotlight Award | Heterodox Award |
| **Q – Directed by Jude Chehab**; Against the Tide – Directed by Sarvnik Kaur; Anhell69 – Directed by Theo Montoya; Bad Press – Directed by Rebecca Landsberry-Baker and Joe Peeler; This House – Directed by Miryam Charles; Midwives – Directed by Snow Hnin Ei Hlaing | **The Buriti Flower – Directed by João Salaviza and Renée Nader Messora**; Four Daughters – Directed by Kaouther Ben Hania; The Echo – Directed by Tatiana Huezo; Past Lives – Directed by Celine Song; Reality – Directed by Tina Satter; The Unknown Country – Directed by Morrisa Maltz |
| Audience Choice Prize | The Unforgettables |
| **Bobi Wine: The People's President – Directed by Moses Bwayo and Christopher Sharp**; 20 Days in Mariupol – Directed by Mstyslav Chernov; The Eternal Memory – Directed by Maite Alberdi; American Symphony – Directed by Matthew Heineman; Beyond Utopia – Directed by Madeleine Gavin; Smoke Sauna Sisterhood – Directed by Anna Hints; The Deepest Breath – Directed by Laura McGann; Confessions of a Good Samaritan – Directed by Penny Lane; Invisible Beauty – Directed by Bethann Hardison and Frédéric Tcheng; Joan Baez: I Am a Noise – Directed by Karen O'Connor, Miri Navasky and Maeve O'Boyle | **The Eternal Memory – Augusto Góngora & Paulina Urrutia**; **Going to Mars: The Nikki Giovanni Project – Nikki Giovanni**; **Kokomo City – Daniella Carter, Koko Da Doll, Liyah Mitchell and Dominique Silver**; **Still: A Michael J. Fox Movie – Michael J. Fox**; **American Symphony – Jon Batiste and Suleika Jaouad**; **Bobi Wine: The People's President – Bobi Wine**; **The Pigeon Tunnel – John le Carré**; **Invisible Beauty – Bethann Hardison**; **Joan Baez: I Am a Noise – Joan Baez**; **Confessions of a Good Samaritan – Penny Lane**; **Apolonia, Apolonia – Apolonia Sokol**; **The Disappearance of Shere Hite – Shere Hite**; **A Still Small Voice – Margaret "Mati" Engel**; **Twice Colonized – Aaju Peter**; **While We Watched – Ravish Kumar** |

=== Broadcast and Shorts ===
| Outstanding Broadcast Film | Outstanding Nonfiction Series |
|---|---|
| **The Stroll – Directed by Kristen Lovell and Zackary Drucker (HBO / Max)**; Being Mary Tyler Moore – Directed by James Adolphus (HBO / Max); Judy Blume Forever – Directed by Davina Pardo and Leah Wolchok (Prime Video); Lowndes County and the Road to Black Power – Directed by Sam Pollard and Geeta Gandbhir (Peacock); Nothing Lasts Forever – Directed by Jason Kohn (Showtime); Pretty Baby: Brooke Shields – Directed by Lana Wilson (Hulu) | **Paul T. Goldman – Directed by Jason Woliner (Peacock)**; Couples Therapy – Directed by Joshua Altman and Bennett Elliott (Showtime); Dear Mama – Directed by Allen Hughes (FX); Pepsi, Where's My Jet? – Directed by Andrew Renzi (Netflix); Stolen Youth: Inside the Cult at Sarah Lawrence – Directed by Zachary Heinzerling (Hulu) |
| Outstanding Anthology Series | Shorts List (Cinema Eye's Annual List of the Year's Top Short Documentaries) |
| **The 1619 Project – Nikole Hannah-Jones, Roger Ross Williams, Shoshana Guy, Caitlin Roper, Kathleen Lingo, Helen Verno and Oprah Winfrey, executive producers (Hulu)**; Chef's Table: Pizza – Andrew Fried, David Gelb and Brian McGinn, executive producers (Netflix); Edge of the Unknown with Jimmy Chin – Elizabeth Chai Vasarhelyi, Jimmy Chin, Pagan Harleman, Anna Barnes and Chris Kugelman, executive producers (National Geographic); Leguizamo Does America – Carolina Saavedra, John Leguizamo, Ben DeJesus, Elizabeth Fischer, Andy Berg, Liz Cole, Noah Oppenheim, Rashida Jones and Amanda Spain, executive producers (MSNBC); Our Planet II – Huw Cordey, Alastair Fothergill and Keith Scholey, executive producers (Netflix); Untold – Chapman Way, Maclain Way, Ben Silverman, Howard T. Owens, Isabel San Vargas, Ryan Duffy, Miguel Tamayo and Jaymee Messler, executive producers (Netflix) | Away – Directed by Ruslan Fedotow; Between Earth and Sky – Directed by Andrew Nadkami; Black Girls Play: The Story of Hand Games – Directed by Joe Brewster and Michèle Stephenson; Deciding Vote – Directed by Jeremy Workman and Rob Lyons; Into the Blue – Directed by Omer Sami; The Last Repair Shop – Directed by Ben Proudfoot and Kris Bowers; Margie Soudek's Salt and Pepper Shakers – Directed by Meredith Moore; Neighbour Abdi – Directed by Douwe Dijkstra; Oasis – Directed by Justine Martin; Will You Look at Me – Directed by Shuli Huang |
| Outstanding Broadcast Editing | Outstanding Broadcast Cinematography |
| **Pretty Baby: Brooke Shields – Sara Newens, Anne Yao and David Teague (Hulu)**; The 1619 Project – Ephraim Kirkwood, Adriana Pacheco, Stefanie Maridueña and Ed Barteski (Hulu); Dear Mama – Lasse Järvi (FX); Nothing Lasts Forever – Paul Marchand and Jack Price (Showtime); Paul T. Goldman – Mike Giambra, Hank Friedmann, Jody McVeigh-Schultz and Danny Scharar (Peacock) | **Nothing Lasts Forever – Heloisa Passos (Showtime)**; The 1619 Project – Jerry Henry (Hulu); The Cave of Adullam – Greg Harriott and Mike Doyle (ESPN); Edge of the Unknown with Jimmy Chin – Ross McDonnell, Alfredo de Juan, Cam Riley, and Nick Kraus (National Geographic); Our Planet II – Kyle McBurnie, John Shier, Matt Aeberhard, Sophie Darlington, Jesse Wilkinson, John Haskew and John Brown (Netflix); Restaurants at the End of the World – Petr Cikhart (National Geographic) |

=== Legacy Award ===
- **The Decline of Western Civilization – Written and directed by Penelope Spheeris; Produced by Gordon Brown, Jeff Prettyman, and Penelope Spheeris; Cinematography by Steve Conant; Editing by Steve Conant**
