= D. Smith =

American singer-songwriter, reality television personality and documentary filmmaker

- Born: July 20, 1975 (age 51); Miami, Florida, US
- Occupations: Singer-songwriter; reality television personality; documentary filmmaker
- Years active: 2008—present
- Known for: Love & Hip Hop Atlanta

D. Smith (born July 20, 1975) is an American singer-songwriter, reality television personality, and documentary filmmaker. He (Note: Smith detransitioned in September 2026 and uses he/him pronouns.) worked on Lil Wayne's Tha Carter III, which was nominated for Album of the Year at the 2009 Grammy Awards and won Best Rap Album. In 2016, he made his reality-tv debut on season five of Love & Hip Hop Atlanta.

His debut documentary Kokomo City (2023) follows four Black transgender sex workers and premiered at the 2023 Sundance Film Festival.

== Early life and education ==
D. Smith was born to a religious family in Miami, Florida where he fell in love with music through church. He wrote his first song at ten years old for his church choir. By seven years old, he thought he knew he was transgender and often fell asleep praying to wake up as a woman.

== Career ==
In Brooklyn, New York, Smith pursued his music career as a producer and collaborated with singer-songwriter Stacey Barthe. Together, they worked with several artists, including Lil' Wayne. In 2008, D. Smith produced and sang on the track "Shoot Me Down" for Lil Wayne's rap album Tha Carter III. For his work on the song, he won the 2009 Grammy Award for Best Rap Album with other collaborators.

Smith also collaborated with other artists prior to his transition, including Andre 3000, Kendrick Lamar, Lloyd, Katy Perry, and Ciara. In 2014, he came out as transgender, and his music career fell in decline; Smith cited his transition as the cause for the break. According to Out, the music industry "stopped returning [his] calls."

He appeared on season five of Love & Hip Hop Atlanta for eight episodes in 2016, making him the first openly trans woman cast on an unscripted reality TV series. The music artist faced heated discussions with fellow cast members on transgender issues, including Waka Flocka and Lil Scrappy. Despite his intention to portray transgender women as non-confrontational, Smith claims he faced pressure from the show's production team to be more confrontational; he said "I'm not a confrontational person, and I forced myself to be, and it was a complete, utter disaster for myself." He left the show later in the season, citing it as a regretful experience.

Following his time on Love & Hip Hop Atlanta, Smith became homeless and relocated back to New York, where he couch-surfed with friends and family, and "looked for what was next." During this time, Smith began production on Kokomo City, a documentary following the lives of four black transgender sex-workers. Along with directing, Smith also shot and edited the film himself on a low-budget and without secure housing. His film, which was produced by Harris Doran, Bill Butler, and Lena Waithe, debuted at the 2023 Sundance Film Festival on January 21, 2023 and won both awards in the Sundance (Next) category. Smith was signed by the Creative Artists Agency the same day.

He was listed as one of 2023's Most Impactful and Influential LGBTQ+ People by Out on their annual Out100 Awards list. He told the magazine, which called his work a "vital breath of fresh air for trans art," that when you start to see "the enemies, you know you're heading in the right direction. Trust the process and know that us being able to fight is a good thing."

== Personal life ==
In May 2023, R&B artist Dustin Michael confirmed his relationship with Smith on Instagram.

On September 17, 2026, Smith detransitioned and began using he/him pronouns. Of this decision, he stated that "Living my life as a woman for 12 years showed me the man that I wanted to become. My respect and love for the transgender community remain unchanged, and I continue to believe that every person deserves to live with dignity, safety, and compassion and have the freedom to become themselves."

== Filmography ==
List of Credits
Year	Title	Role	Format	Notes
2006	D. Smith: Cab Driver	Actor, Composer	Short Film	
2015	Love & Hip Hop: Hollywood	Self	Reality TV	Appeared for 1 episode
2016	Love & Hip Hop: Atlanta	Self	Reality TV	Appeared for 8 consecutive episodes
2023	Kokomo City	Director, Cinematographer, Casting Director, Editor, Producer	Documentary	

== Accolades ==
Award	Date of ceremony	Category	Recipient(s)	Result	Ref.
Sundance Film Festival	January 29, 2023	NEXT Audience Award	Kokomo City	Won	
Sundance Film Festival	January 29, 2023	NEXT Innovator Award	Kokomo City	Won	
Berlin International Film Festival	February 25, 2023	Panorama: Best Documentary Film	D. Smith	Won	
Berlin International Film Festival	February 25, 2023	Teddy Award for Best Documentary/Essay Film	D. Smith	Nominated	
Critics' Choice Documentary Awards	November 12, 2023	Best Documentary Feature	Kokomo City	Nominated	
Critics' Choice Documentary Awards	November 12, 2023	Best First Documentary Feature	Kokomo City	Nominated	
Critics' Choice Documentary Awards	November 12, 2023	Best Score	D. Smith	Nominated	
Critics' Choice Documentary Awards	November 12, 2023	Best Cinematography	D. Smith	Nominated	
Critics' Choice Documentary Awards	November 12, 2023	Best Editing	D. Smith	Nominated	
IndieWire Critics Poll	December 11, 2023	Best Documentary	Kokomo City	1st Place	
Chicago Film Critics Association Awards	12 December 2023	Best Documentary Film	Kokomo City	Won	
Las Vegas Film Critics Society	December 13, 2023	Best Documentary	Kokomo City	Nominated	
Indiana Film Journalists Association	December 17, 2023	Best Documentary	Kokomo City	Won	
San Diego Film Critics Society	19 December 2023	Best Documentary	Kokomo City	Nominated	
Florida Film Critics Circle Awards	21 December 2023	Best Documentary Film	Kokomo City	Nominated	
Florida Film Critics Circle Awards	21 December 2023	Golden Orange	D. Smith	Won	
National Society of Film Critics Awards	January 6, 2024	Best Non-Fiction Film	Kokomo City	Runner-up (Note: Tied with 20 Days in Mariupol.)	
Denver Film Critics Society	January 12, 2024	Best Documentary Feature	Kokomo City	Nominated	
Cinema Eye Honors	January 12, 2024	Outstanding Non-Fiction Feature	D. Smith, Harris Doran and Bill Butler	Nominated	
Cinema Eye Honors	January 12, 2024	Outstanding Direction	D. Smith	Nominated	
Cinema Eye Honors	January 12, 2024	Outstanding Cinematography	D. Smith	Nominated	
Cinema Eye Honors	January 12, 2024	Outstanding Sound Design	Roni Pillischer	Nominated	
Cinema Eye Honors	January 12, 2024	Outstanding Debut	Kokomo City	Won	
Cinema Eye Honors	January 12, 2024	The Unforgettables	Daniella Carter, Koko Da Doll, Liyah Mitchell and Dominique Silver	Won	
Black Reel Awards	16 January 2024	Outstanding Documentary Feature	Kokomo City	Nominated	
Black Reel Awards	16 January 2024	Outstanding Cinematography	D. Smith	Nominated	
Black Reel Awards	16 January 2024	Outstanding Editing	D. Smith	Nominated	
Directors Guild of America Awards	February 10, 2024	Outstanding Directing – Documentary	D. Smith	Nominated	
Independent Spirit Awards	February 25, 2024	Best Documentary Feature	D. Smith, Bill Butler, Harris Doran	Nominated	
Dorian Awards	February 26, 2024	Documentary of the Year	Kokomo City	Won	
Dorian Awards	February 26, 2024	LGBTQ Documentary of the Year	Kokomo City	Won	
GLAAD Media Awards	March 14, 2024	Outstanding Documentary	Kokomo City	Won (Note: Tied with Beyond the Aggressives: 25 Years Later and The Stroll.)	
