= 2000 Meters to Andriivka =

2025 Ukrainian documentary film

- American theatrical release poster
- Ukrainian: 2000 метрів до Андріївки
- Directed by: Mstyslav Chernov
- Produced by: Mstyslav Chernov; Michelle Mizner; Raney Aronson-Rath; Alex Babenko (co-producer)
- Cinematography: Mstyslav Chernov
- Edited by: Michelle Minzer
- Music by: Sam Slater
- Production companies: Associated Press; Frontline
- Distributed by: PBS Distribution (United States); Dogwoof (International)
- Release dates: 23 January 2025 (Sundance); 25 July 2025 (United States); 28 August 2025 (Ukraine)
- Running time: 108 minutes
- Countries: Ukraine; United States
- Languages: Ukrainian; English

2000 Meters to Andriivka (Ukrainian: «2000 метрів до Андріївки», romanized: 2000 metriv do Andriivky) is a 2025 documentary film produced and directed by Mstyslav Chernov. It follows Chernov, Alex Babenko and the Ukrainian 3rd Assault Brigade during a mission to liberate the Russian-occupied village of Andriivka, during the ongoing Russo-Ukrainian War.

The film had its world premiere at the 2025 Sundance Film Festival on 23 January, and was given a limited release in the United States on 25 July by PBS Distribution, prior to a broadcast on Frontline in December. It was theatrically released in Ukraine on 28 August. It was selected as the Ukrainian entry for the Best International Feature Film at the 98th Academy Awards, but was not nominated, and won a News and Documentary Emmy Award.

Frontline and The Associated Press co-produced the film, with PBS Distribution distributing the film.

== Premise ==
Mstislav Chernov (director, cameraman and producer) and Alex Babenko (cameraman and co-producer) follow a platoon of Ukrainian soldiers of the 3rd Assault Brigade on a mission to liberate Russian-occupied Andriivka in 2023, during the second year of the Russo-Ukrainian war.

The film is largely composed of body-cam footage recorded by Ukrainian soldiers in combat, recording in real-time the battlefield confrontations and aerial attacks, the bloodbath caused by it, and the Russian advance through the Donetsk Oblast.

As a result of the war, the village was completely destroyed and its population fully displaced.

== Production ==
Chernov's previous documentary 20 Days in Mariupol won the Academy Award for Best Documentary Feature at the 96th Academy Awards. As a war correspondent for the Associated Press, Chernov reported from various conflict zones around the world before Russo-Ukrainian war. Editing was handled by American Frontline editor Michelle Mizner, with whom Chernov had previously worked on 20 Days in Mariupol. The score was composed by two-time Grammy Award winner Sam Slater and produced by Austrian sound artist Jakob Vasak. The music features a minimalist approach to sonic and musical composition, centered around the use of a war drum, Vasak’s self-developed electroacoustic instrument, the Kobophon, as well as original field recordings from the war zone and walkie-talkie communication.

== Release ==
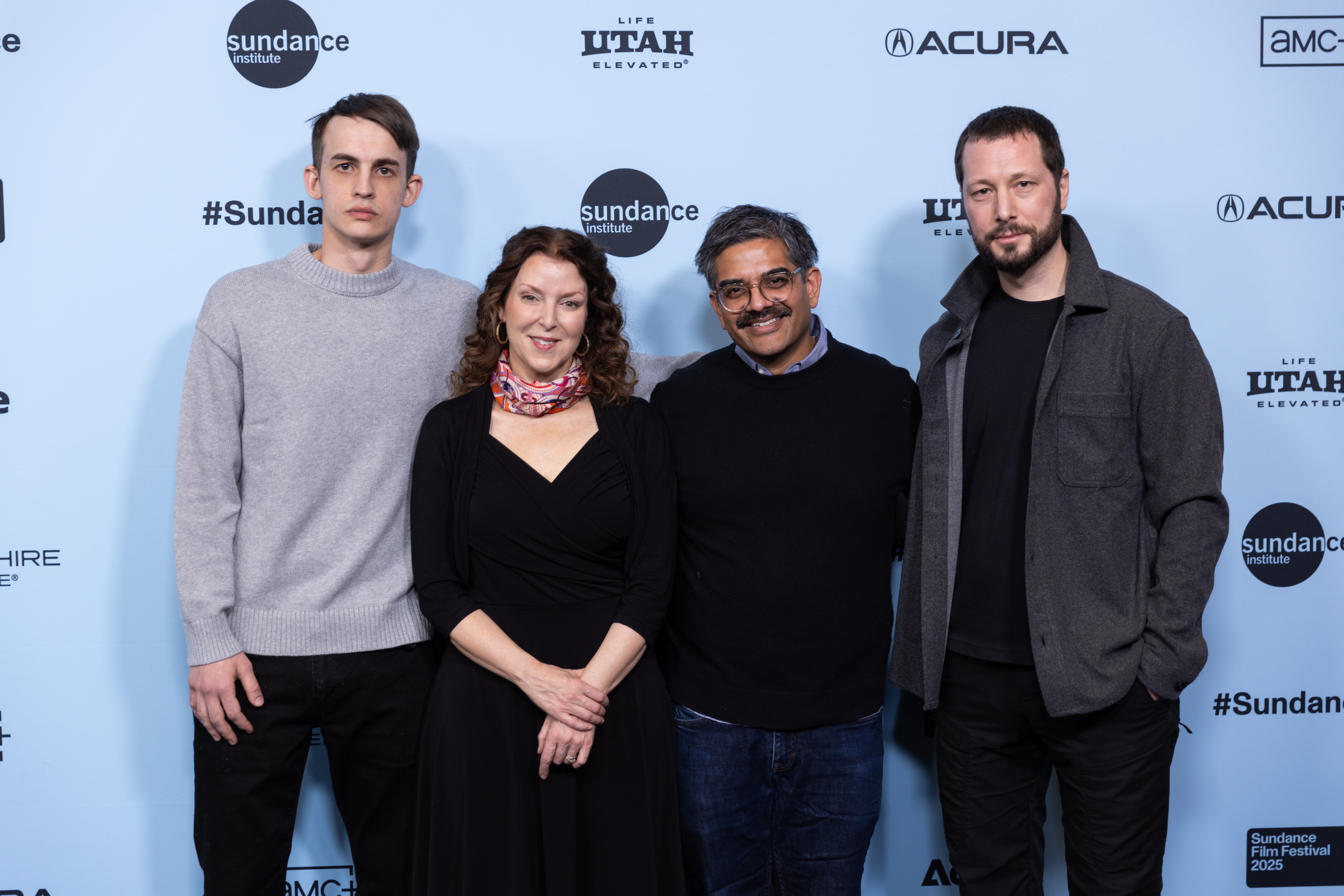
The film crew at the Sundance Film Festival, January 2025

2000 Meters to Andriivka had its world premiere at the Sundance Film Festival on 23 January 2025 and won the Directing Award: World Cinema Documentary. Dogwoof will handle international sales. On 30 March 2025, at the CPH:DOX 2025, the film won the F:ACT AWARD category for best documentary in the investigative journalism genre. "Ultimately we give the F:ACT award to '2000 Meters to Andriivka' not just because it's a conflict on our doorstep, but because it's a masterpiece in filmmaking: a haunting, multi layered portrayal of war comparable to All Quiet on the Western Front", the festival jury concluded. It was limitedly released in the United States on 25 July 2025, by PBS Distribution, prior to a broadcast on Frontline in December 2025.

The Ukrainian premiere took place in June 2025 at the DocuDays UA documentary film festival in Kyiv. The film received the main prize in the "Docu/World" nomination and two more awards: "Rights Now!" and "Audience Award".

The film was also selected to the 2025 Cannes Film Festival. It was included in the "Horizons" program of the 59th Karlovy Vary International Film Festival. It won at the DocAviv International Documentary Film Festival. It also won the audience award at Millennium Docs Against Gravity, at the Transilvania International Film Festival (TIFF.24), at the Mykolaychuk OPEN, and at the Sheffield Docs (United Kingdom). It also had a special screening at the 20th Rome Film Festival in October 2025.

It won the Stockholm Documentary Competition of the 2025 Stockholm International Film Festival on 5 November 2025.

The film will represent Ukraine in the category Academy Award for Best Documentary Feature at the 98th Academy Awards. and was longlisted for the award in Academy Award for Best International Feature Film nomination and shortlisted in Academy Award for Best Documentary Feature nomination. The film was nominated in the category of Best Documentary Feature at the Gotham Awards 2025. At the National Film Critics' Award "Kinokolo" the film won in the category "Best Feature Documentary", and Chernov himself won in the nomination "Best Director". Film was nominated for the BAFTA in Best Documentary category. Chernov himself was also nominated as the screenwriter for the Writers Guild of America Award in the Documentary Screenplay category. The film won the News & Documentary Emmy Awards for Outstanding Direction: Documentary and was nominated in five other categories.

The film will compete in the Awards Buzz – Best International Feature Film section of the 37th Palm Springs International Film Festival on 7 January 2026. Later film won as Best Film and Best Documentary at Ukrainian National Film Academy Award Golden Dzyga.

== Reception ==
On the review aggregator website Rotten Tomatoes, 93% of 42 critics' reviews are positive. The website's consensus reads: "Captured with bracing frankness by director Mtsyslav Chernov, 2000 Meters to Andriivka is a poignant missive from the front lines." Metacritic, which uses a weighted average, assigned the film a score of 88 out of 100, based on 16 critics, indicating "universal acclaim".

=== Accolades ===
Award / Film Festival	Date of ceremony	Category	Recipient(s)	Result	Ref.
Golden Dzyga	25 July 2026	Best Film	2000 Meters to Andriivka	Nominated	
Golden Dzyga	25 July 2026	Best Direction	Mstyslav Chernov	Nominated	
Golden Dzyga	25 July 2026	Best Documentary	2000 Meters to Andriivka	Won	
Golden Dzyga	25 July 2026	Best Cinematography	Mstyslav Chernov, Alex Babenko	Won	
News & Documentary Emmy Awards	28 May 2026	Outstanding Documentary	2000 Meters to Andriivka	Nominated	
News & Documentary Emmy Awards	28 May 2026	Outstanding Current Affairs Documentary	2000 Meters to Andriivka	Nominated	
News & Documentary Emmy Awards	28 May 2026	Outstanding Writing: Documentary	Mstyslav Chernov	Nominated	
News & Documentary Emmy Awards	28 May 2026	Outstanding Direction: Documentary	Mstyslav Chernov	Won	
News & Documentary Emmy Awards	28 May 2026	Outstanding Cinematography: Documentary	Mstyslav Chernov and Alex Babenko	Nominated	
News & Documentary Emmy Awards	28 May 2026	Outstanding Editing: Documentary	Michelle Mizner	Nominated	
ASCAP Composer’s Choice Awards 2026	28 April 2026	Documentary Film Score of the Year	Sam Slater	Nominated	
American Society of Cinematographers Awards	8 March 2026	Documentary Award	Mstyslav Chernov and Alex Babenko	Won	
BAFTA	22 February 2026	Best Documentary	Mstyslav Chernov, Raney Aronson-Rath, and Michelle Mizner	Nominated	
duPont–Columbia Award	28 January 2026	Silver Baton	2000 Meters to Andriivka	Won	
George Polk Awards	2025	Foreign Television Reporting	Mstyslav Chernov and Alex Babenko	Won	
Docudays UA	13 June 2025	Docu/World Section	2000 Meters to Andriivka	Won	
Docudays UA	13 June 2025	Audience Award	2000 Meters to Andriivka	Won	
Docudays UA	13 June 2025	Rights Now! Section	2000 Meters to Andriivka	Won	
CPH:DOX	30 March 2025	F:ACT Award	2000 Meters to Adriivka	Won	
Critics' Choice Documentary Awards	9 November 2025	Best Documentary Feature	2000 Meters to Adriivka	Nominated	
Critics' Choice Documentary Awards	9 November 2025	Best Director	Mstyslav Chernov	Nominated	
Critics' Choice Documentary Awards	9 November 2025	Best Narration	Mstyslav Chernov	Nominated	
Critics' Choice Documentary Awards	9 November 2025	Best Score	Sam Slater	Nominated	
Critics' Choice Documentary Awards	9 November 2025	Best Editing	Michelle Mizner	Nominated	
Stockholm International Film Festival	14 November 2025	Best Documentary	2000 Meters to Andriivka	Won	
Gotham Independent Film Awards	1 December 2025	Best Documentary Feature	Mstyslav Chernov, Raney Aronson-Rath, and Michelle Mizner	Nominated	
Cinema Eye Honors	8 January 2026	Outstanding Non-Fiction Feature	Mstyslav Chernov, Michelle Mizner, Raney Aronson-Rath, Alex Babenko, and Sam Slater	Nominated	
Cinema Eye Honors	8 January 2026	Outstanding Direction	Mstyslav Chernov	Nominated	
Cinema Eye Honors	8 January 2026	Outstanding Production	Mstyslav Chernov, Michelle Mizner and Raney Aronson-Rath	Nominated	
Cinema Eye Honors	8 January 2026	Outstanding Editing	Michelle Mizner	Nominated	
Cinema Eye Honors	8 January 2026	Outstanding Original Music Score	Sam Slater	Nominated	
Cinema for Peace Awards	16 February 2026	Cinema for Peace Dove for The Most Valuable Documentary of the Year	2000 Meters to Andriivka	Nominated	
Writers Guild of America Awards	8 March 2025	Documentary Screenplay	Mstyslav Chernov	Won	
Sundance Film Festival	2 February 2025	Grand Jury Prize – World Documentary Competition	2000 Meters to Andriivka	Nominated	
Sundance Film Festival	2 February 2025	Directing Award: World Cinema Documentary	Mstyslav Chernov	Won	

== See also ==
- List of submissions to the 98th Academy Awards for Best International Feature Film
- List of Ukrainian submissions for the Academy Award for Best International Feature Film
