= American Symphony (film) =

2023 film by Matthew Heineman

- Release poster
- Directed by: Matthew Heineman
- Produced by: Matthew Heineman; Lauren Domino; Joedan Okun
- Starring: Jon Batiste
- Cinematography: Tony Hardman; Matthew Heineman; Thorsten Thielow
- Edited by: Sammy Dane; Matthew Heineman; Jim Hession; Fernando Villegas
- Music by: Jon Batiste
- Production companies: Our Time Projects; Mercury Studios; Higher Ground Productions
- Distributed by: Netflix
- Release dates: August 31, 2023 (Telluride); November 29, 2023
- Running time: 104 minutes
- Country: United States
- Language: English

American Symphony is a 2023 American biographical documentary film directed, written, shot, and edited by Matthew Heineman. It explores a year in the life of musician Jon Batiste, his music career, and his wife's struggle with leukemia.

It had its world premiere at the 50th Telluride Film Festival on August 31, 2023, and was released by Netflix on November 29. The film received a Best Original Song nomination, for "It Never Went Away", at the 96th Academy Awards.

== Premise ==
Explores a year in the life of musician Jon Batiste, chronicling his career in music (including his 11 nominations at the 64th Annual Grammy Awards) and the struggles his wife, Suleika Jaouad, faces with leukemia.

== Release ==
American Symphony had its world premiere at the 50th Telluride Film Festival on August 31, 2023. Shortly after, Netflix and Higher Ground Productions acquired distribution rights to the film. It was released on November 29, 2023.

== Reception ==
=== Critical response ===
On the review aggregator website Rotten Tomatoes, 93% of 27 critics' reviews are positive, with an average rating of 7.2/10. The website's consensus reads: "More than a standard musician's documentary, American Symphony uses its behind-the-scenes access to present a portrait of courage and creativity." Metacritic, which uses a weighted average, assigned the film a score of 74 out of 100, based on 9 critics, indicating "generally favorable" reviews.

The film has been praised for its candid look at the creative process in the face of the hurdles that life throws in the way. Steve Pond of The Wrap stated the film is, "about the creation of art in the face of pressure, tragedy and heartbreak, and about the tension between the glory of creation and the pain of living. It manages to capture the glory but it never ignores the price." John Nugent of Empire Magazine said, "Moving and musical, this is a striking portrait of courage and creativity in the face of some horrific odds chucked at you by life’s lottery."

Director Matthew Heineman has been hailed for his handling of the subject, with Amy Nicholson of LAist's Film Week stating, "This is off base for [director Matthew Heineman], but he brings this great cinematic scale to it," and Randy Myers of the San Jose Mercury News adding "Both Batiste and Jaouad put their faith and trust in Heineman, and the result is a candid testament to an unconditional love that’s threatened by cancer but defined by one remarkable couple’s commitment to get through it together."

=== Accolades ===
Award	Date of ceremony	Category	Recipient(s)	Result	Ref.
Academy Awards	March 10, 2024	Best Original Song	Jon Batiste and Dan Wilson ("It Never Went Away")	Nominated	
Alliance of Women Film Journalists	January 3, 2024	Best Documentary	American Symphony	Won (Note: Tied with Smoke Sauna Sisterhood.)	
American Cinema Editors	March 3, 2024	Best Edited Documentary (Theatrical)	Sammy Dane, Matthew Heineman, Jim Hession, and Fernando Villegas	Nominated	
Astra Film and Creative Arts Awards	January 6, 2024	Best Documentary Feature	American Symphony	Nominated	
Black Film Critics Circle	December 20, 2023	Best Documentary	American Symphony	Won	
Black Reel Awards	January 16, 2024	Outstanding Documentary Feature	American Symphony	Nominated	
Black Reel Awards	January 16, 2024	Outstanding Score	Jon Batiste	Nominated	
Black Reel Awards	January 16, 2024	Outstanding Original Song	Jon Batiste and Dan Wilson ("It Never Went Away")	Nominated	
Capri Hollywood International Film Festival	January 2, 2024	Best Documentary Feature	American Symphony	Won	
Cinema Audio Society Awards	March 2, 2024	Outstanding Achievement in Sound Mixing for Motion Picture – Documentary	Tom Paul, Tristan Baylis, and Ryan Collison	Nominated	
Cinema Eye Honors	January 12, 2024	Outstanding Production	Lauren Domino, Matthew Heineman, and Joedan Okun	Nominated	
Cinema Eye Honors	January 12, 2024	Outstanding Original Score	Jon Batiste	Nominated	
Cinema Eye Honors	January 12, 2024	Audience Choice Prize	American Symphony	Nominated	
Cinema Eye Honors	January 12, 2024	The Unforgettables	Jon Batiste and Suleika Jaouad	Won	
Critics' Choice Documentary Awards	November 12, 2023	Best Documentary Feature	American Symphony	Nominated	
Critics' Choice Documentary Awards	November 12, 2023	Best Music Documentary	American Symphony	Won	
Critics' Choice Documentary Awards	November 12, 2023	Best Director	Matthew Heineman	Nominated	
Critics' Choice Documentary Awards	November 12, 2023	Best Score	Jon Batiste	Won	
Critics' Choice Documentary Awards	November 12, 2023	Best Cinematography	Tony Hardmon, Matthew Heineman, and Thorsten Thielow	Nominated	
Critics' Choice Documentary Awards	November 12, 2023	Best Editing	Sammy Dane, Jim Hession, Matthew Heineman, and Fernando Villegas	Nominated	
Dallas–Fort Worth Film Critics Association	December 18, 2023	Best Documentary Film	American Symphony	Won	
Denver Film Critics Society	January 12, 2024	Best Documentary Feature	American Symphony	Nominated	
Golden Reel Awards	March 3, 2024	Outstanding Achievement in Music Editing – Documentary	Ignacio Bonet	Nominated	
Golden Reel Awards	March 3, 2024	Outstanding Achievement in Sound Editing – Feature Documentary	Tristan Baylis, Tom Paul, Leslie Bloome, Matt Snedecor, and Mark Filip	Nominated	
Grammy Awards	February 2, 2025	Best Music Film	Jon Batiste, Matthew Heineman, Lauren Domino, and Joedan Okun	Won	
Grammy Awards	February 2, 2025	Best Song Written for Visual Media	Jon Batiste and Dan Wilson ("It Never Went Away")	Won	
Houston Film Critics Society	January 22, 2024	Best Documentary Feature	American Symphony	Nominated	
Indiana Film Journalists Association	December 17, 2023	Best Documentary	American Symphony	Nominated	
Las Vegas Film Critics Society	December 13, 2023	Best Documentary	American Symphony	Nominated	
Middleburg Film Festival	October 22, 2023	Documentary Spotlight Award	Matthew Heineman	Won	
Montclair Film Festival	October 30, 2023	Audience Award – Documentary Feature	American Symphony	Won	
Montclair Film Festival	October 30, 2023	Documentary Filmmaker Award	Matthew Heineman	Won	
NAACP Image Awards	March 16, 2024	Outstanding Documentary (Film)	American Symphony	Nominated	
North Texas Film Critics Association	December 18, 2023	Best Documentary Film	American Symphony	Nominated	
Oklahoma Film Critics Circle	January 3, 2024	Best Documentary	American Symphony	Won	
Philadelphia Film Festival	October 29, 2023	Audience Award – Documentary Feature	American Symphony	Won	
Producers Guild of America Awards	February 25, 2024	Outstanding Producer of Documentary Theatrical Motion Pictures	American Symphony	Won	
San Diego Film Critics Society	December 19, 2023	Best Documentary	American Symphony	Nominated	
San Francisco Bay Area Film Critics Circle Awards	January 9, 2024	Best Documentary Film	American Symphony	Nominated	
Satellite Awards	March 3, 2024	Best Motion Picture – Documentary	American Symphony	Nominated	
Satellite Awards	March 3, 2024	Best Original Song	Jon Batiste and Dan Wilson ("It Never Went Away")	Nominated	
Satellite Awards	March 3, 2024	Best Sound (Editing and Mixing)	Tristan Baylis, Matt Snedecor, and William Tzouris	Nominated	
Society of Composers & Lyricists	February 13, 2024	Outstanding Original Score for an Independent Film	Jon Batiste	Nominated	
Society of Composers & Lyricists	February 13, 2024	Outstanding Original Song for a Dramatic or Documentary Visual Media Production	Jon Batiste and Dan Wilson ("It Never Went Away")	Nominated	
St. Louis Film Critics Association	December 17, 2023	Best Documentary Film	American Symphony	Won (Note: Tied with Still: A Michael J. Fox Movie.)	
Vancouver Film Critics Circle	February 12, 2024	Best Documentary	American Symphony	Nominated	
Virginia Film Festival	October 29, 2023	Audience Award – Documentary Feature	American Symphony	Won	
Virginia Film Festival	October 29, 2023	Directorial Achievement Award	Matthew Heineman	Won	
Washington D.C. Area Film Critics Association Awards	December 10, 2023	Best Documentary	American Symphony	Nominated	
Woodstock Film Festival	September 30, 2023	Audience Award – Best Documentary Feature	American Symphony	Won	
World Soundtrack Awards	October 17, 2024	Best Original Song	Jon Batiste and Dan Wilson ("It Never Went Away")	Nominated	
Cinema for Peace Awards	2024	Dove for The Most Valuable Documentary of the Year	American Symphony	Nominated	
