= Daniella Carter =

American transgender rights activist (born 1994/1995)

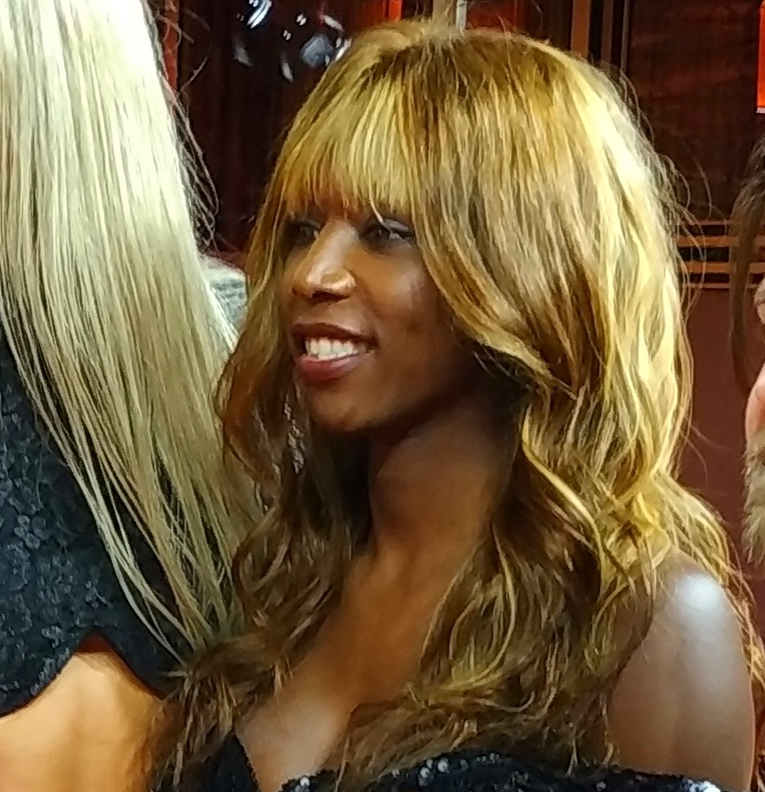
- Carter in 2023 at the Berlinale
- Born: 1994 or 1995 (age 31–32)
- Occupation: Activist

Daniella Carter (born 1994 or 1995) is an American activist. She came to prominence as an advocate of transgender rights and a speaker on the issue of youth homelessness. Her work often centres around her personal life story.

At 18 months old, Carter was placed in a foster home in New York City, where she experienced various types of abuse. At the age of 14, Carter came out as transgender to her foster parents. Upon their rejection of her identity, she fled her home and became homeless. She turned to survival sex work while continuing to attend high school.

In 2014, she was one of 7 transgender youths to share their stories in the documentary film The T Word, produced and hosted by Laverne Cox. After the film, she started engaging in public speaking at events such as TED Talks. In 2023, Carter came to further prominence as one of four Black transgender sex workers featured in D. Smith's documentary film Kokomo City, which premiered at the Sundance Film Festival and received critical acclaim.

== Early life ==
At 18 months old, Carter was placed in an upscale foster home in the Queens borough of New York City and raised by conservative Pentecostal Christian parents. Carter says she experienced physical, emotional and sexual abuse while in foster care.

In kindergarten, Carter started wanting to present as female. At 14 years old, she came out as transgender to her foster mother. Because of her identity, her parents cut her off. She became homeless, living in the New York City Subway system while continuing to attend Martin Luther King Jr. High School daily. In order to meet her needs, Carter resorted to survival sex work through much of her adolescence. She received some support from high school faculty members, who did not know she was homeless.

Carter started transitioning while in high school. Because she had no money for a wig, she wrapped T-shirts around her head. She was rejected and bullied by her peers; once, after being physically attacked, Carter called her foster mother to ask to return home, but she refused. In her first year of college, Carter was abducted, raped and robbed along with a schoolmate. She says that hospital staff asked her if she was "sure it wasn't sex work" after they learned that she was trans and couldn't use a rape kit. Following the incident, she applied and was enrolled in a Bailey House housing program.

== Career ==
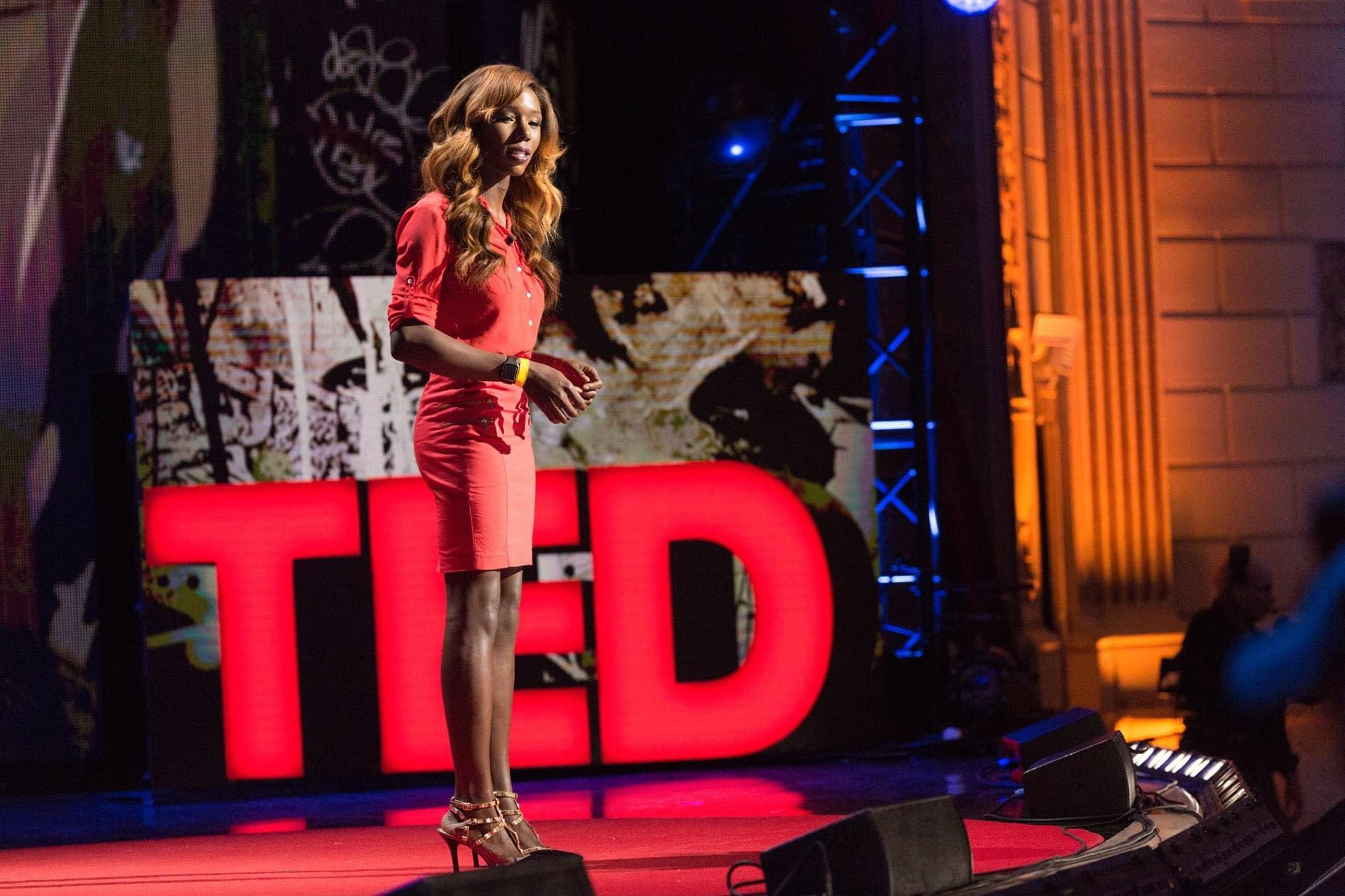
Carter speaking at a TED Talk in 2015

Carter came to prominence as one of seven transgender youths featured in Laverne Cox's 2014 documentary The T Word. In the Emmy award-winning film, she recounts the story of her rape and subsequent hospital treatment. Following The T Word, Carter started engaging in public speaking at events such as TED and TEDx Talks, where she told her life story. In 2017, she became a youth ambassador for the Human Rights Campaign. In 2020, she launched Daniella's Guestbook, an online platform aiming to spotlight emerging artists.

Carter came to further prominence in 2023 with her role in D. Smith's documentary Kokomo City. The film follows four Black trans women — Koko Da Doll, Liyah Mitchell, Dominique Silver, and Carter — as they recount their stories and reflexions on sex work. Kokomo City held its world premiere at the Sundance Film Festival, where it won two awards, and was later screened at the Berlin International Film Festival, where it won an audience award. It received critical acclaim. A Dazed review praised Carter's "wise and memorable monologues" and described her speech on the inherent danger of sex work as a "standout scene".

In 2023, Carter was also part of the committee that worked to classify the House of Xtravaganza, an emblematic location of the New York City ballroom scene, as a historical landmark.

== Personal life ==
Carter was married at 21 years old. The couple later divorced.
