= San Diego Film Critics Society Awards 2023 =

28th San Diego Film Critics Society Awards

28th San Diego Film Critics Society Awards
- Date: December 19, 2023
- Site: San Diego, California, U.S.

Highlights
- Best Picture: Are You There God? It's Me, Margaret.
- Most awards: Are You There God? It's Me, Margaret. Barbie (5)
- Most nominations: Barbie / Oppenheimer (12)

The 28th San Diego Film Critics Society Awards were announced on December 19, 2023. The nominations were announced on December 14, 2023, with Barbie and Oppenheimer ("Barbenheimer") leading the nominations with twelve each, followed by Killers of the Flower Moon and Poor Things with eight each.

Are You There God? It's Me, Margaret. and Barbie won the most awards with five wins each, with the former winning Best Picture.

== Winners and nominees ==
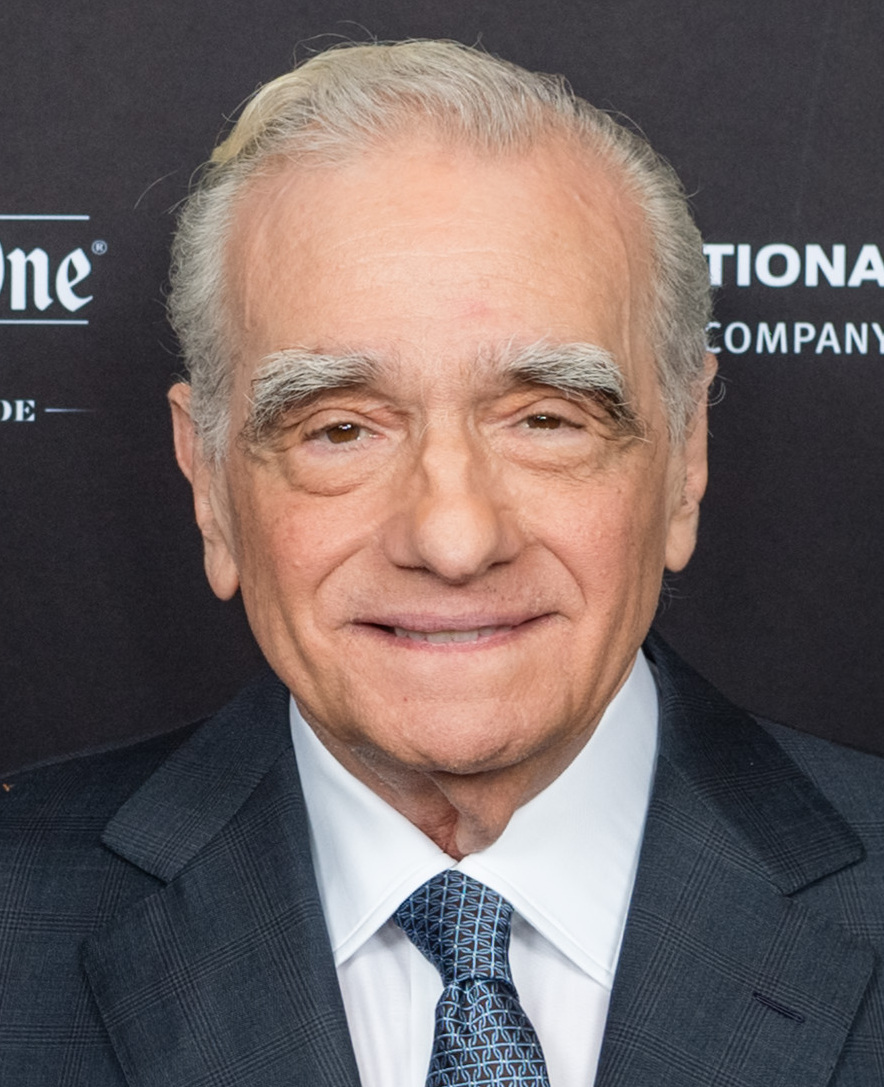
Martin Scorsese, Best Director winner

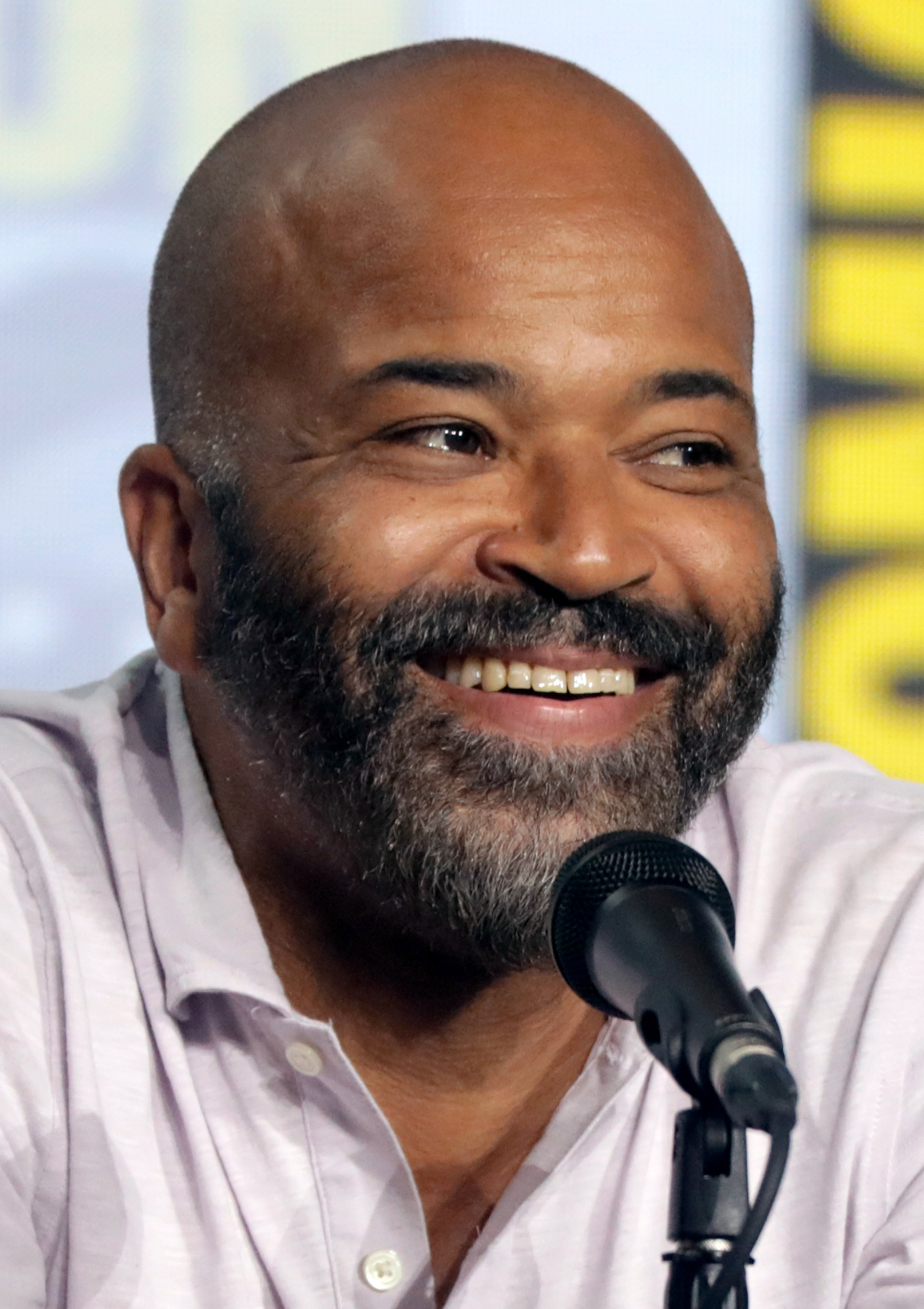
Jeffrey Wright, Best Actor winner

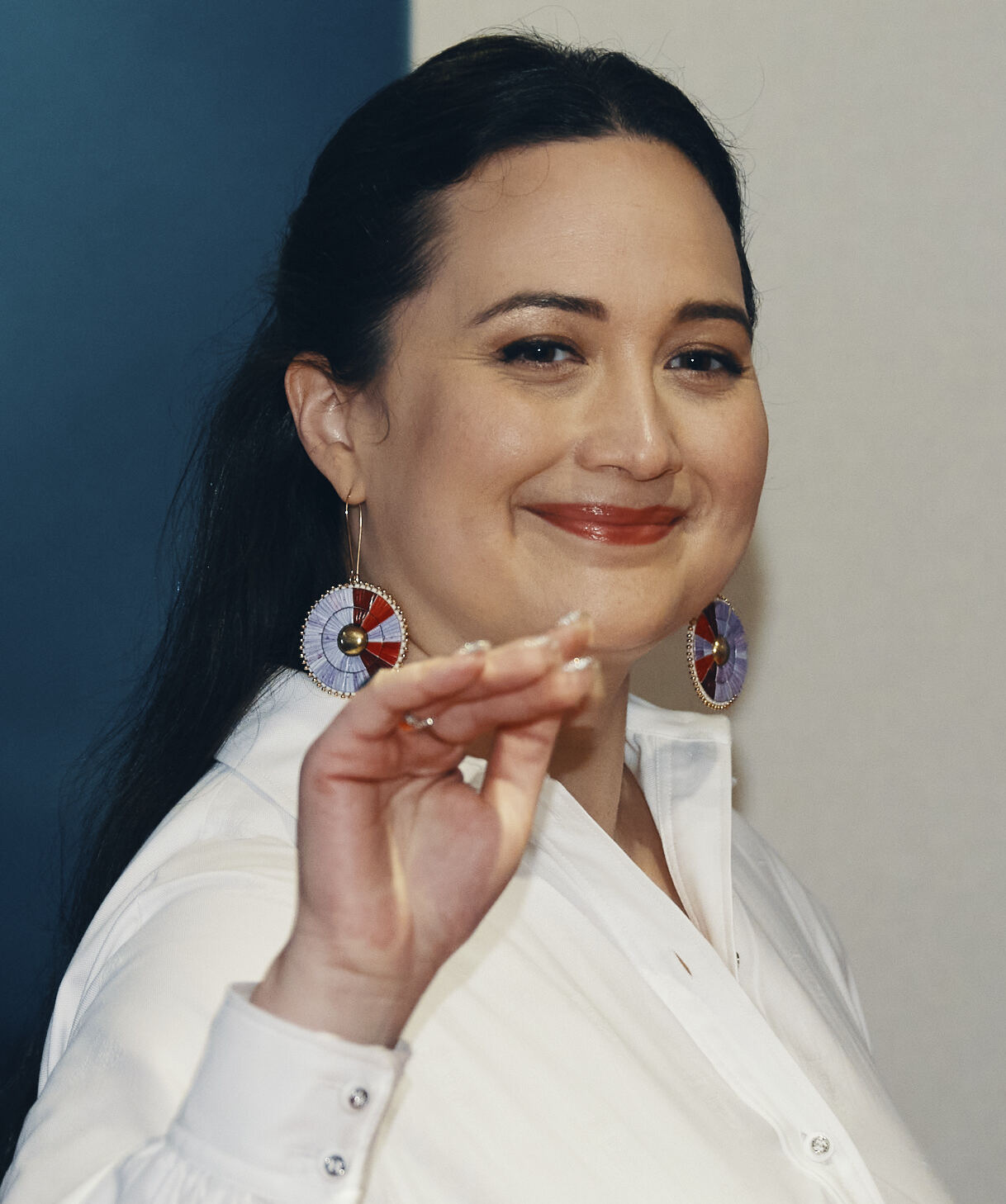
Lily Gladstone, Best Actress winner

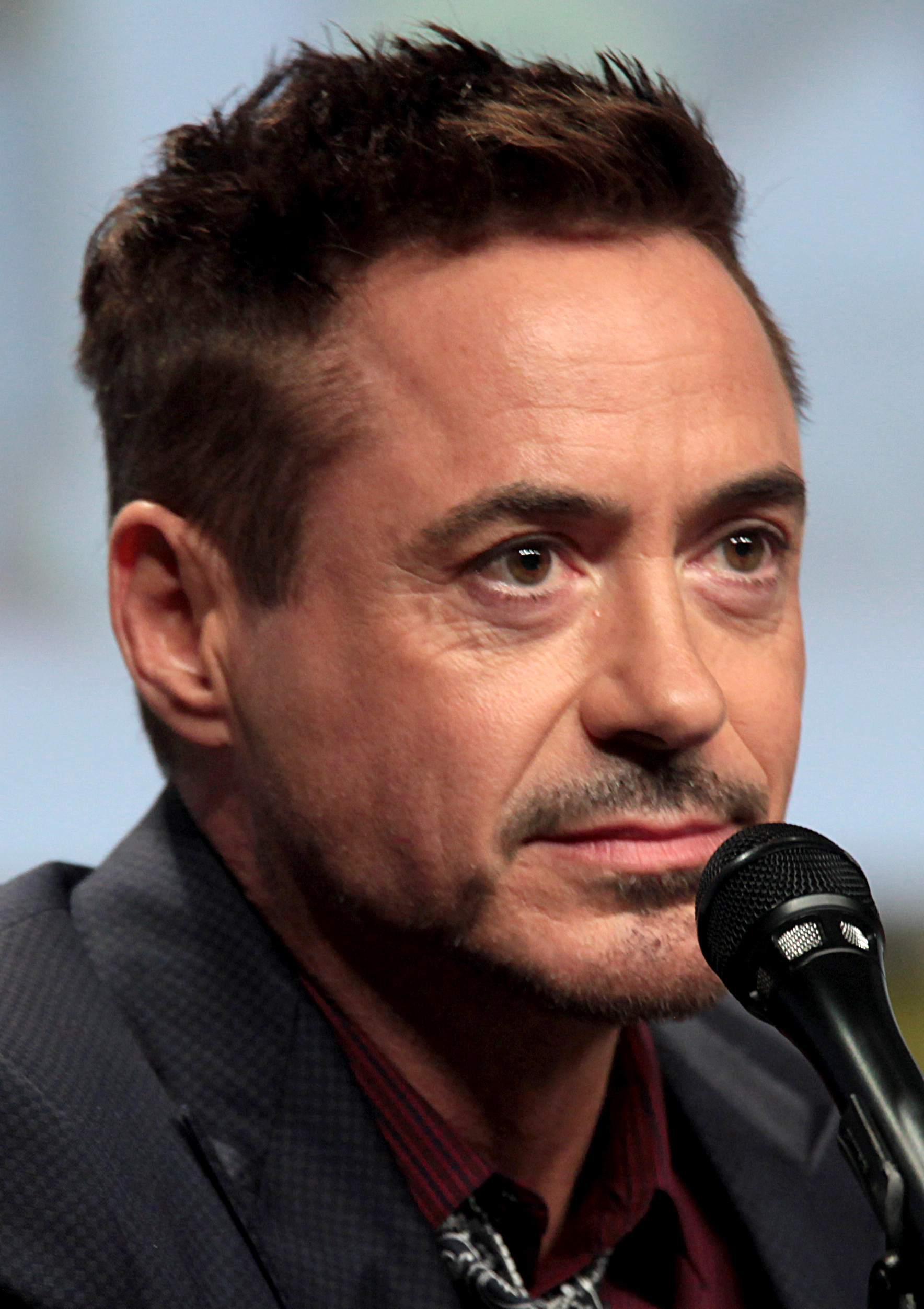
Robert Downey Jr., Best Supporting Actor winner

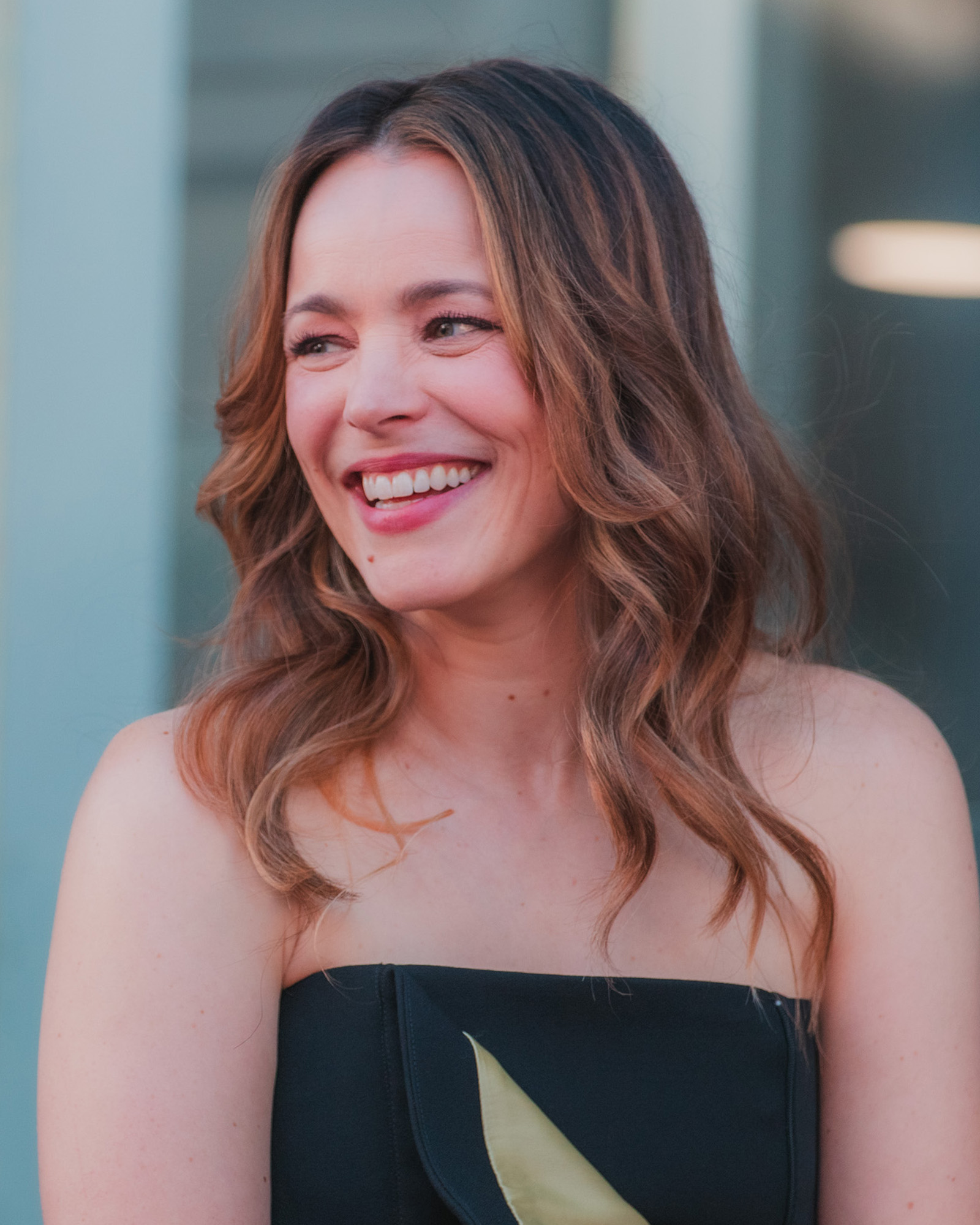
Rachel McAdams, Best Supporting Actress winner

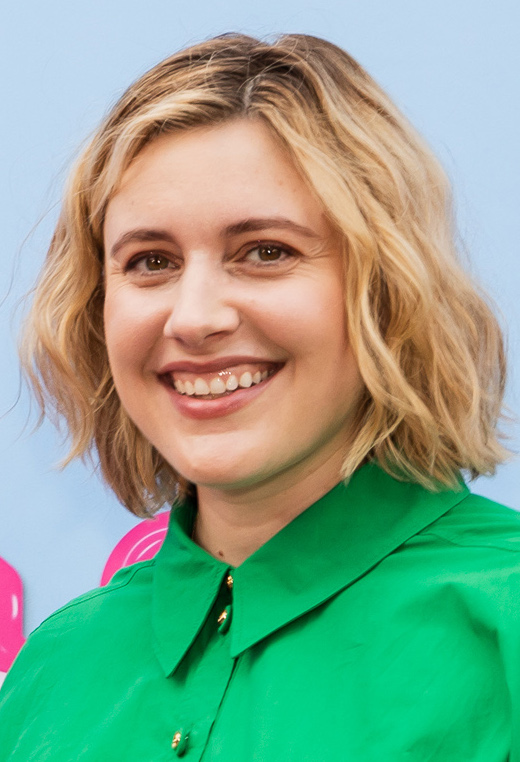
Greta Gerwig, Best Original Screenplay co-winner

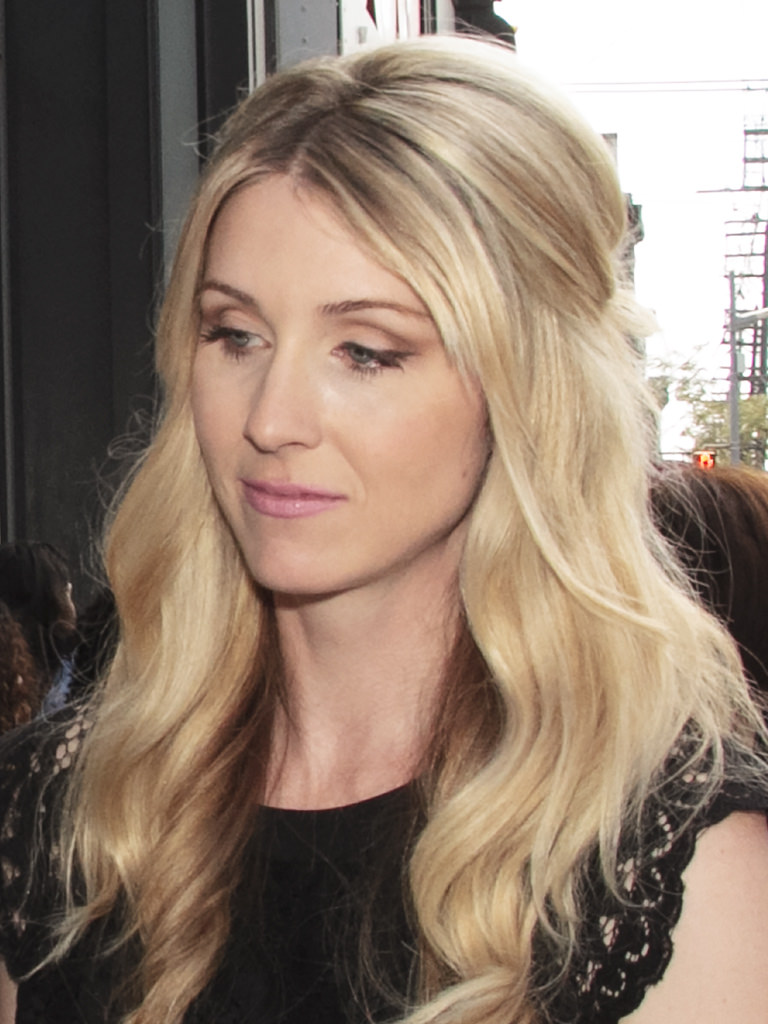
Kelly Fremon Craig, Best Adapted Screenplay co-winner

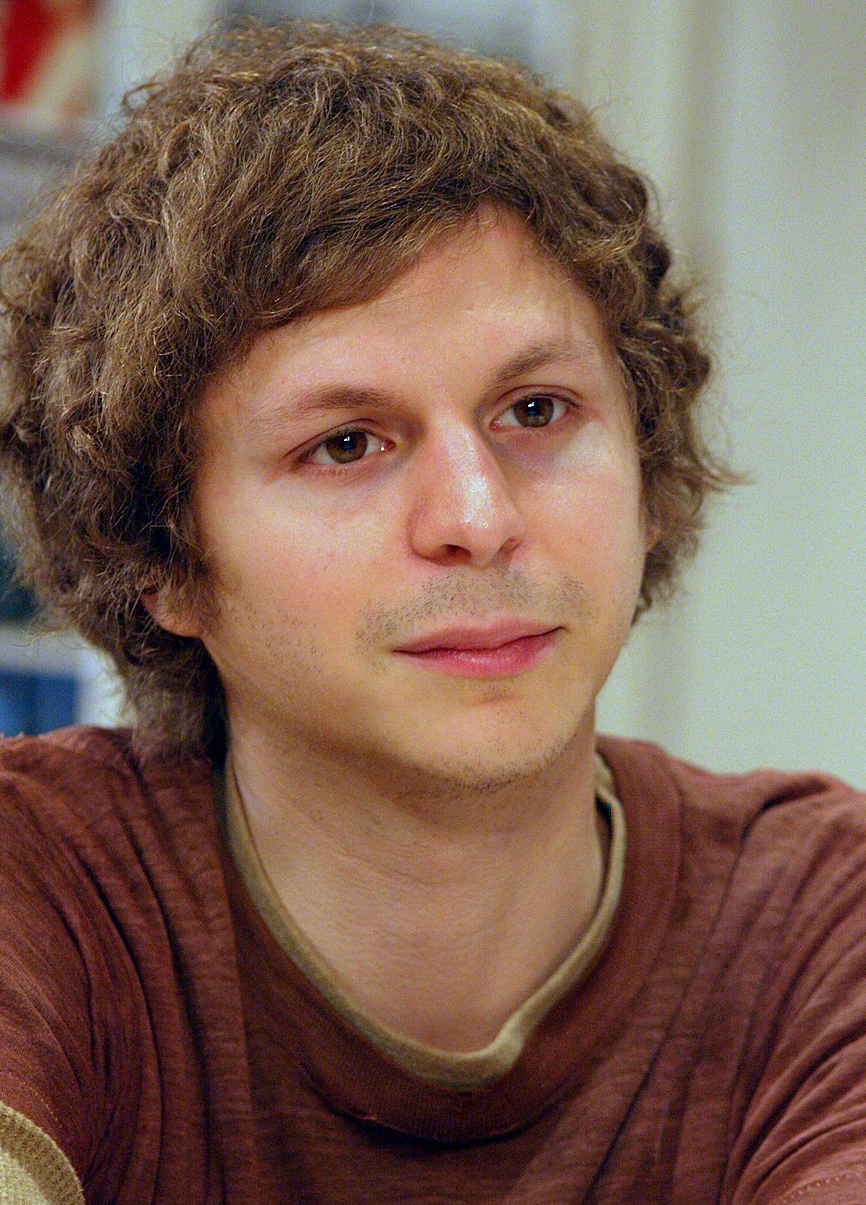
Michael Cera, Best Comedic Performance winner

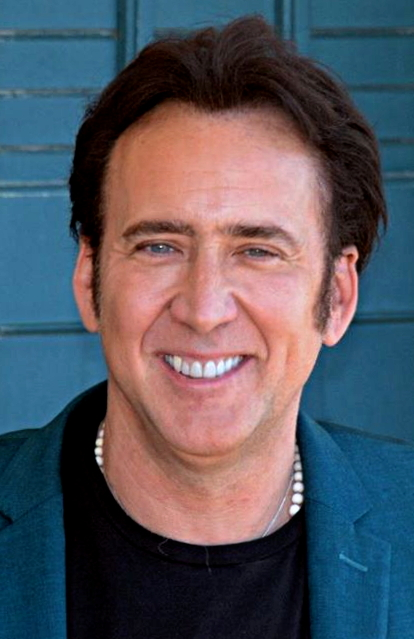
Nicolas Cage, Special Award for Body of Work winner

Winners are listed at the top of each list in bold, while the runner-ups and nominees for each category are listed under them.

| Best Picture | Best Director |
|---|---|
| **Are You There God? It's Me, Margaret.**; Runner-up: Oppenheimer; American Fiction; The Holdovers; Killers of the Flower Moon | **Martin Scorsese – Killers of the Flower Moon**; Runner-up: Greta Gerwig – Barbie; Kelly Fremon Craig – Are You There God? It's Me, Margaret.; Cord Jefferson – American Fiction; Christopher Nolan – Oppenheimer |
| Best Actor | Best Actress |
| **Jeffrey Wright – American Fiction as Thelonious "Monk" Ellison**; Runner-up: Paul Giamatti – The Holdovers as Paul Hunham; Colman Domingo – Rustin as Bayard Rustin; Zac Efron – The Iron Claw as Kerry Von Erich; Cillian Murphy – Oppenheimer as J. Robert Oppenheimer | **Lily Gladstone – Killers of the Flower Moon as Mollie Burkhart**; Runner-up: Sandra Hüller – Anatomy of a Fall as Sandra Voyter; Abby Ryder Fortson – Are You There God? It's Me, Margaret. as Margaret Simon; Margot Robbie – Barbie as Barbie; Emma Stone – Poor Things as Bella Baxter |
| Best Supporting Actor | Best Supporting Actress |
| **Robert Downey Jr. – Oppenheimer as Lewis Strauss**; Runner-up: Ryan Gosling – Barbie as Ken; Sterling K. Brown – American Fiction as Clifford "Cliff" Ellison; Charles Melton – May December as Joe Yoo; Mark Ruffalo – Poor Things as Duncan Wedderburn | **Rachel McAdams – Are You There God? It's Me, Margaret. as Barbara Simon**; Runner-up: Da'Vine Joy Randolph – The Holdovers as Mary Lamb; Jodie Foster – Nyad as Bonnie Stoll; Sandra Hüller – The Zone of Interest as Hedwig Höss; Julianne Moore – May December as Gracie Atherton-Yoo |
| Best Adapted Screenplay | Best Original Screenplay |
| **Kelly Fremon Craig and Judy Blume – Are You There God? It's Me, Margaret.**; Runner-up: Cord Jefferson and Percival Everett – American Fiction; Jonathan Glazer – The Zone of Interest; Christopher Nolan, Kai Bird, and Martin J. Sherwin – Oppenheimer; Eric Roth and Martin Scorsese – Killers of the Flower Moon | **Greta Gerwig and Noah Baumbach – Barbie**; Runner-up: David Hemingson – The Holdovers; Samy Burch – May December; Celine Song – Past Lives; Justine Triet and Arthur Harari – Anatomy of a Fall |
| Best Ensemble | Best Comedic Performance |
| **The Holdovers**; Runner-up: Barbie; Runner-up: A Haunting in Venice; Air; Oppenheimer | **Michael Cera – Barbie as Allan**; Runner-up: Mark Ruffalo – Poor Things as Duncan Wedderburn; Abby Ryder Fortson – Are You There God? It's Me, Margaret. as Margaret Simon; Ryan Gosling – Barbie as Ken; Nathan Lane – Dicks: The Musical as Harris |
| Best Animated Film | Best Documentary |
| **The Boy and the Heron**; Runner-up: Spider-Man: Across the Spider-Verse; Chicken Run: Dawn of the Nugget; Nimona; Robot Dreams | **Still: A Michael J. Fox Movie**; Runner-up: 20 Days in Mariupol; Runner-up: Little Richard: I Am Everything; American Symphony; Kokomo City |
| Best Foreign Language Film | Best First Feature (Director) |
| **Anatomy of a Fall**; Runner-up: Godzilla Minus One; Runner-up: The Zone of Interest; Fallen Leaves; Monster | **Cord Jefferson – American Fiction**; Runner-up: Celine Song – Past Lives; Chloe Domont – Fair Play; Danny and Michael Philippou – Talk to Me; A. V. Rockwell – A Thousand and One |
| Best Cinematography | Best Editing |
| **Rodrigo Prieto – Killers of the Flower Moon**; Runner-up: Hoyte van Hoytema – Oppenheimer; Rodrigo Prieto – Barbie; Robbie Ryan – Poor Things; Dariusz Wolski – Napoleon | **Laurent Sénéchal – Anatomy of a Fall**; Runner-up: Jennifer Lame – Oppenheimer; Nick Houy – Barbie; Yorgos Mavropsaridis – Poor Things; Thelma Schoonmaker – Killers of the Flower Moon |
| Best Costume Design | Best Production Design |
| **Jacqueline Durran, Charlotte Finlay, and Hope Slepak – Barbie**; Runner-up: Vincent Dumas, Zsuzsa Stenger, and Holly Waddington – Poor Things; David Crossman and Janty Yates – Napoleon; Ellen Mirojnick – Oppenheimer; Jacqueline West – Killers of the Flower Moon | **Sarah Greenwood – Barbie**; Runner-up: Ruth De Jong – Oppenheimer; Jack Fisk – Killers of the Flower Moon; Arthur Max – Napoleon; James Price and Shona Heath – Poor Things |
| Best Stunt Choreography | Best Use of Music |
| **John Wick: Chapter 4**; Runner-up: Mission: Impossible – Dead Reckoning Part One; The Killer; Napoleon; Polite Society | **Barbie**; Runner-up: Air; Are You There God? It's Me, Margaret.; The Holdovers; The Teacher |
| Best Sound Design | Best Visual Effects |
| **The Zone of Interest**; Runner-up: Oppenheimer; Godzilla Minus One; Mission: Impossible – Dead Reckoning Part One; The Teacher | **Godzilla Minus One**; Runner-up: Poor Things; John Wick: Chapter 4; Mission: Impossible – Dead Reckoning Part One; Oppenheimer |
Best Youth Performance (For a performer under the age of 18)
**Abby Ryder Fortson – Are You There God? It's Me, Margaret. as Margaret Simon**; Runner-up: Milo Machado-Graner – Anatomy of a Fall as Daniel Maleski; Joe Bird – Talk to Me as Riley; Christian Convery – Cocaine Bear as Henry; Jude Hill – A Haunting in Venice as Leopold Ferrier
Breakthrough Actor
**Abby Ryder Fortson – Are You There God? It's Me, Margaret. as Margaret Simon**
Special Award for Body of Work
**Nicolas Cage (Dream Scenario, The Flash, The Old Way, Renfield, The Retirement Plan, and Sympathy for the Devil)**
