= Critics Choice Documentary Award for Best Narration =

The Best Narration is one of the annual Critics' Choice Documentary Awards. The award is given to the narrator and writer.

== History ==
It was first presented at the fourth ceremony to Bruce Springsteen for Western Stars.

== Winners and nominees ==
Year	Film	Narrator(s)	Writer(s)	Ref.
2019 (4th)	Western Stars	Bruce Springsteen		
2019 (4th)	Anthropocene: The Human Epoch	Alicia Vikander	Jennifer Baichwal	
2019 (4th)	The Biggest Little Farm	John Chester and Molly Chester	John Chester	
2019 (4th)	The Edge of Democracy	Petra Costa	Petra Costa, Carol Pires, David Barker, and Moara Passoni	
2019 (4th)	The Elephant Queen	Chiwetel Ejiofor	Mark Deeble	
2019 (4th)	For Sama	Waad Al-Kateab		
2019 (4th)	Joseph Pulitzer: Voice of the People	Adam Driver	Oren Rudavsky and Bob Seidman	
2019 (4th)	One Child Nation	Nanfu Wang		
2020 (5th)	David Attenborough: A Life on Our Planet	David Attenborough		
2020 (5th)	Dick Johnson Is Dead	Kirsten Johnson		
2020 (5th)	Fireball: Visitors from Darker Worlds	Werner Herzog		
2020 (5th)	Mr. Soul!	Blair Underwood	Ellis Haizlip	
2020 (5th)	My Octopus Teacher	Craig Foster		
2020 (5th)	Time	Fox Rich		
2020 (5th)	Totally Under Control	Alex Gibney		
2021 (6th)	Val	Jack Kilmer	Val Kilmer	
2021 (6th)	9/11: Inside the President's War Room	Jeff Daniels	—N/a	
2021 (6th)	Becoming Cousteau	Vincent Cassel	Mark Monroe and Pax Wassermann	
2021 (6th)	The Crime of the Century	Alex Gibney		
2021 (6th)	The Neutral Ground	CJ Hunt		
2021 (6th)	The Real Charlie Chaplin	Pearl Mackie	Oliver Kindeberg, Peter Middleton, and James Spinney	
2021 (6th)	The Year Earth Changed	David Attenborough	—N/a	
2022 (7th)	Good Night Oppy	Angela Bassett	Helen Kearns and Ryan White	
2022 (7th)	Deep in the Heart: A Texas Wildlife Story	Matthew McConaughey	Ben Masters	
2022 (7th)	Fire of Love	Miranda July	Shane Boris, Erin Casper, Jocelyne Chaput, and Sara Dosa	
2022 (7th)	Our Great National Parks	Barack Obama	—N/a	
2022 (7th)	Riotsville, U.S.A.	Charlene Modeste	Tobi Haslett	
2022 (7th)	Three Minutes: A Lengthening	Helena Bonham Carter	Bianca Stigter	
2023 (8th)	Still: A Michael J. Fox Movie	Michael J. Fox		
2023 (8th)	20 Days in Mariupol	Mstyslav Chernov		
2023 (8th)	32 Sounds	Sam Green		
2023 (8th)	The Disappearance of Shere Hite	Dakota Johnson	Nicole Newnham	
2023 (8th)	John Lennon: Murder Without a Trial	Kiefer Sutherland	—N/a	
2023 (8th)	Secrets of the Elephants	Natalie Portman	Martin Williams	
2024 (9th)	Steve! (Martin) A Documentary in 2 Pieces	Steve Martin		
2024 (9th)	Bad River	Quannah Chasinghorse and Edward Norton	Mary Mazzio	
2024 (9th)	Billy & Molly: An Otter Love Story	Billy Mail and Susan Mail	Charlie Hamilton James	
2024 (9th)	Dahomey	Lucrece Houegbelo, Parfait Viayinon, Didier Sedoha Nassegande and Sabine Badjogoumin	Makenzy Orcel	
2024 (9th)	Made in England: The Films of Powell and Pressburger	Martin Scorsese		
2024 (9th)	Queens	Angela Bassett	Chloë Sarosh	
2025 (10th)	Orwell: 2+2=5	Damian Lewis	George Orwell; adapted by Raoul Peck	
2025 (10th)	2000 Meters to Andriivka	Mstyslav Chernov		
2025 (10th)	The American Revolution	Peter Coyote	Geoffrey C. Ward	
2025 (10th)	The Americas	Tom Hanks	Michael Gunton, Holly Spearing, Steve Cole, Kathryn Jeffs, Matt Richards, Giles Badger, Victoria Buckley, Alex Griffiths, Hannah Hoare, Poppy Riddle, Gillian Taylor, Nikki Waldron, Evie Wright, Charlotte Bostock, Victoria Bobin, and Ingrid Kvale	
2025 (10th)	Apocalypse in the Tropics	Petra Costa		
2025 (10th)	Octopus!	Phoebe Waller-Bridge	Gabriel Bisset-Smith	
2026 (11th)	The History of Concrete	John Wilson		
2026 (11th)	The AI Doc: Or How I Became an Apocaloptimist	Daniel Roher and Caroline Lindy		
2026 (11th)	Lorne	Chris Parnell	Morgan Neville, Alan Lowe, and Jake Hostetter	
2026 (11th)	Nuisance Bear	Mike Tunalaaq Gibbons		
2026 (11th)	Rehearsals for a Revolution	Pegah Ahangarani		
2026 (11th)	Remake	Ross McElwee		

== See also ==
- Primetime Emmy Award for Outstanding Narrator
