= 35th Producers Guild of America Awards =

35th Annual Producers Guild Awards
- Date: February 25, 2024
- Location: The Ray Dolby Ballroom at Ovation Hollywood, Los Angeles, California
- Country: United States
- Presented by: Producers Guild of America

Highlights
- Best Producer(s) Motion Picture: Oppenheimer – Emma Thomas, Charles Roven, and Christopher Nolan
- Best Producer(s) Animated Feature: Spider-Man: Across the Spider-Verse – Phil Lord, Christopher Miller, Amy Pascal, Avi Arad, and Christina Steinberg
- Best Producer(s) Documentary Motion Picture: American Symphony – Lauren Domino, Matthew Heineman, and Joedan Okun

The 35th Producers Guild of America Awards (also known as 2024 Producers Guild Awards or 2024 PGA Awards), honoring the best film and television producers of 2023, were held at the Ray Dolby Ballroom at Ovation Hollywood in Los Angeles, California on February 25, 2024. The nominees in the documentary category were announced on December 12, 2023, the nominations in the sports, children's and short-form categories were announced on December 15, 2023, and the remaining nominations for film and television were announced on January 12, 2024. The nominations for the PGA Innovation Award were announced on February 9, 2024.

The winners of the sports and children's categories were revealed on February 20, 2024, in Manhattan, while the winners of the PGA Innovation Award and short-film categories were announced on February 22, 2024, during the PGA nominees celebration in Los Angeles.

== Winners and nominees ==
=== Film ===
Darryl F. Zanuck Award for Outstanding Producer of Theatrical Motion Pictures
- Oppenheimer – Emma Thomas, Charles Roven, and Christopher Nolan
  - American Fiction
  - Anatomy of a Fall
  - Barbie
  - The Holdovers
  - Killers of the Flower Moon
  - Maestro
  - Past Lives
  - Poor Things
  - The Zone of Interest
Outstanding Producer of Animated Theatrical Motion Pictures
- Spider-Man: Across the Spider-Verse – Avi Arad, Amy Pascal, Phil Lord, Christopher Miller, and Christina Steinberg
  - The Boy and the Heron
  - Elemental
  - The Super Mario Bros. Movie
  - Teenage Mutant Ninja Turtles: Mutant Mayhem
Outstanding Producer of Documentary Theatrical Motion Pictures
- American Symphony – Lauren Domino, Matthew Heineman, and Joedan Okun
  - 20 Days in Mariupol
  - Beyond Utopia
  - The Disappearance of Shere Hite
  - The Mother of All Lies
  - Smoke Sauna Sisterhood
  - Squaring the Circle (The Story of Hipgnosis)

=== Television ===
Norman Felton Award for Outstanding Producer of Episodic Television, Drama
- Succession (HBO) – Jesse Armstrong, Adam McKay, Will Ferrell, Frank Rich, Kevin Messick, Mark Mylod, Jane Tranter, Tony Roche, Scott Ferguson, Jon Brown, Lucy Prebble, Will Tracy, Georgia Pritchett, Ted Cohen, Dara Schnapper, Susan Soon He Stanton, Gabrielle Mahon, and Francesca Gardiner
  - The Crown (Netflix)
  - The Diplomat (Netflix)
  - The Last of Us (HBO)
  - The Morning Show (Apple TV+)
Danny Thomas Award for Outstanding Producer of Episodic Television, Comedy
- The Bear (Hulu) – Josh Senior, Joanna Calo, Christopher Storer, Matty Matheson, Cooper Wehde, Rene Gube, and Tyson Bidner
  - Barry (HBO)
  - Jury Duty (Freevee)
  - Only Murders in the Building (Hulu)
  - Ted Lasso (Apple TV+)
David L. Wolper Award for Outstanding Producer of Limited or Anthology Series Television
- Beef (Netflix) – Lee Sung Jin, Steven Yeun, Ali Wong, Jake Schreier, Ravi Nandan, Alli Reich, Carrie Kemper, Jes Anderson, Savey Cathey, Inman Young, Matthew Medlin, Alex Russell, and Alice Ju
  - All the Light We Cannot See (Netflix)
  - Daisy Jones & the Six (Prime Video)
  - Fargo (FX)
  - Lessons in Chemistry (Apple TV+)
Outstanding Producer of Streamed or Televised Motion Pictures
- Black Mirror: Beyond the Sea (Netflix) – Charlie Brooker, Jessica Rhoades, and Annabel Jones
  - Mr. Monk's Last Case: A Monk Movie (Peacock)
  - Quiz Lady (Hulu)
  - Reality (HBO)
  - Red, White & Royal Blue (Prime Video)
Outstanding Producer of Non-Fiction Television
- Welcome to Wrexham (FX) – Josh Drisko, Bryan Rowland, Jeff Luini, Alan Bloom, Nicholas Frenkel, George Dewey, Rob McElhenney, Ryan Reynolds, Miloš Balać, Liz Spano, Aaron Lovell, Shannon Owen, Patrick McGarvey, Patrick Gooing, and Molly Milstein
  - 60 Minutes (CBS)
  - The 1619 Project (Hulu)
  - Albert Brooks: Defending My Life (HBO)
  - Being Mary Tyler Moore (HBO)
Outstanding Producer of Game & Competition Television
- RuPaul's Drag Race (MTV) – RuPaul Charles, Fenton Bailey, Randy Barbato, Tom Campbell, Mandy Salangsang, Steven Corfe, Michele Mills, Tim Palazzola, John Polly, Thairin Smothers, Lisa Steele, Sara Kordy, Jen Passovoy, Jeremy McGovern, Michelle Visage, Ashlei Dabney, Michael Seligman, Alicia Gargaro-Magaña, Carson Kressley, and Ross Mathews
  - The Amazing Race (CBS)
  - Squid Game: The Challenge (Netflix)
  - Top Chef (Bravo)
  - The Voice (NBC)
Outstanding Producer of Live Entertainment, Variety, Sketch, Standup & Talk Television
- Last Week Tonight with John Oliver (HBO) – John Oliver, Tim Carvell, Liz Stanton, Jeremy Tchaban, Catherine Owens, Whit Conway, Kaye Foley, Laura L. Griffin, Christopher McDaniel, Kate Mullaney, Matt Passet, Megan Peck Shub, Wynn Van Dusen, Marian Wang, and Charles Wilson
  - Carol Burnett: 90 Years of Laughter + Love (NBC)
  - Chris Rock: Selective Outrage (Netflix)
  - Dave Chappelle: The Dreamer (Netflix)
  - Saturday Night Live (NBC)
Outstanding Sports Program
- Beckham (Netflix)
  - 100 Foot Wave (HBO)
  - Formula 1: Drive to Survive (Netflix)
  - Hard Knocks: Training Camp with the New York Jets (HBO)
  - Shaun White: The Last Run (Max)
Outstanding Children's Program
- Sesame Street (Max)
  - Goosebumps (Disney+/Hulu)
  - Gremlins: Secrets of the Mogwai (Max)
  - Star Wars: The Bad Batch (Disney+)
  - The Velveteen Rabbit (Apple TV+)
Outstanding Short-Form Program
- Succession: Controlling the Narrative (HBO)
  - Carpool Karaoke: The Series (Apple TV+)
  - I Think You Should Leave with Tim Robinson (Netflix)
  - The Last of Us: Inside the Episode (HBO)
  - Only Murders in the Building: One Killer Question (Hulu)

=== PGA Innovation Award ===
PGA Innovation Award
- Body of Mine (Kost)
  - The Eye and I (EDDA)
  - JFK Memento (TARGO)
  - Letters From Drancy (East City Films)
  - MLK: Now Is the Time (TIME Studios)
  - Ocean of Light: Dolphins VR (Meta Quest)
  - Our Ocean Our Future (Hidden Worlds Entertainment)
  - Out of Scale (A Kurzgesagt Adventure)
  - Reimagined (Very Cavaliere Productions)
  - Space Explorers: Blue Marble Trilogy (Felix & Paul Studios)
  - Wallace & Gromit in The Grand Getaway (Aardman)
  - The World's Largest Tailgate (Kansas City Chiefs)

=== David O. Selznick Achievement Award in Theatrical Motion Pictures ===
- Martin Scorsese

=== Milestone Award ===
- Charles D. King

=== Norman Lear Achievement Award in Television ===
- Gail Berman
