= The Disappearance of Shere Hite =

2023 documentary film by Nicole Newnham

- Theatrical release poster
- Directed by: Nicole Newnham
- Produced by: Nicole Newnham; Kimberley Ferdinando; Trevor Smith; Molly O'Brien; R. J. Cutler; Elise Pearlstein
- Narrated by: Dakota Johnson
- Cinematography: Rose Bush
- Edited by: Eileen Meyer
- Music by: Lisbeth Scott
- Production companies: Industrial Media; NBC News Studios; This Machine; TeaTime Pictures
- Distributed by: IFC Films; Sapan Studios
- Release dates: January 20, 2023 (Sundance); November 17, 2023 (United States)
- Running time: 118 minutes
- Country: United States
- Language: English
- Box office: $53,189

The Disappearance of Shere Hite is a 2023 American documentary film directed by Nicole Newnham. The film is narrated by Dakota Johnson, and follows the life of American-born German sex educator and feminist Shere Hite.

== Release ==
The Disappearance of Shere Hite had its world premiere at the 2023 Sundance Film Festival on January 20. The film was also set to screen at the Miami and Cleveland International Film Festival in March. In May 2023, IFC Films and Sapan Studios acquired North American distribution rights to the documentary. It was released on November 17, 2023.

== Critical reception ==
On the review aggregator website Rotten Tomatoes, 100% of 60 critics' reviews are positive, with an average rating of 7.9/10. Metacritic, which uses a weighted average, assigned the film a score of 80 out of 100, based on 9 critics, indicating "generally favorable" reviews. Leslie Felperin of The Hollywood Reporter praised the film and called it "a smart tribute to a fascinating woman".

=== Accolades ===
Award	Date of ceremony	Category	Recipient(s)	Result	Ref.
Sundance Film Festival	29 January 2023	U.S. Documentary Competition: Grand Jury Prize	The Disappearance of Shere Hite	Nominated	
Miami International Film Festival	12 March 2023	Documentary Achievement Award	The Disappearance of Shere Hite	Nominated	
Cleveland International Film Festival	1 April 2023	Nesnady and Schwartz Best Documentary Award	The Disappearance of Shere Hite	Nominated	
Critics' Choice Documentary Awards	12 November 2023	Best Archival Documentary	The Disappearance of Shere Hite	Nominated	
Critics' Choice Documentary Awards	12 November 2023	Best Biographical Documentary	The Disappearance of Shere Hite	Nominated	
Critics' Choice Documentary Awards	12 November 2023	Best Narration	Nicole Newnham, Dakota Johnson	Nominated	
Cinema Eye Honors	12 January 2024	The Unforgettables	Shere Hite	Won	
Producers Guild of America Awards	25 February 2024	Outstanding Producer of Documentary Theatrical Motion Pictures	The Disappearance of Shere Hite	Nominated	
