= Kokomo City =

- Film poster
- Directed by: D. Smith
- Produced by: D. Smith; Harris Doran; Bill Butler
- Cinematography: D. Smith
- Edited by: D. Smith
- Production companies: Couch Potatoe Pictures; Hillman Grad Productions
- Distributed by: Magnolia Pictures
- Release dates: January 21, 2023 (Sundance); July 28, 2023 (United States)
- Running time: 73 minutes
- Country: United States
- Language: English
- Box office: $118,728

Kokomo City is a 2023 American documentary film, directed, produced, and edited by D. Smith. It explores the lives of four Black trans women and their experiences as sex workers in New York and Georgia. Lena Waithe serves as an executive producer.

The film had its world premiere at the Sundance Film Festival on January 21, 2023, and was released in theaters on July 28, 2023, by Magnolia Pictures.

== Plot ==
The film explores the lives of Daniella Carter, Dominique Silver, Koko Da Doll, and Liyah Mitchell in New York and Georgia through interviews and re-enactments with actors. During the film, Carter, Silver, Doll, and Mitchell discuss their experiences as Black trans women and as sex workers. Smith also interviews Black men.

== Production ==
D. Smith had a successful career in the music industry, producing songs for Lil Wayne, Ciara, Keri Hilson, Billy Porter and André 3000. However, when she began to transition, she was essentially forced out of the industry, and ended up broke and homeless. Smith had the idea for a documentary film revolving around sex work, after wondering what would happen if she had to turn to it to sustain herself, and those who had no other options. Smith was still homeless when she began working on the project, with a camera being purchased by a host of where she was once staying, and a laptop by a producer.

To find subjects for the film, Smith turned to Instagram and YouTube. Smith wanted her subjects to feel comfortable, telling them to talk as if they were talking to her and shooting at lower angles to make it look as if they were at a sleepover. Lena Waithe and her producing partner, Rishi Rajani boarded the film as executive producers after having been blown away after viewing the film.

== Release ==
The film had its world premiere at the Sundance Film Festival on January 22, 2023. Shortly after, Magnolia Pictures acquired distribution rights to the film. It also screened at the 73rd Berlin International Film Festival on February 21, 2023, where it won the Panorama Audience Award, and SXSW on March 13, 2023. It was released in theaters on July 28, 2023. It was broadcast and released on Paramount+ with Showtime on February 2, 2024.

== Reception ==
On the review aggregator website Rotten Tomatoes, 99% of 76 critics' reviews are positive, with an average rating of 7.7/10. The website's consensus reads: "Kokomo City is a rousing docu effort that illuminates trans lives within a world of adverse circumstance and invariable optimism." Metacritic, which uses a weighted average, assigned the film a score of 79 out of 100, based on 20 critics, indicating "generally favorable reviews".

Peter Debruge of Variety wrote, "This doc rocks, using music to set the tempo for its snappy mix of head-turning talking heads, tongue-in-cheek reenactments and outside-the-box supporting visuals." Lovia Gyarkye of The Hollywood Reporter wrote, "these women share their experiences with familial rejection, masculine sexual anxiety and a retaliatory world threatened by the dissolution of the gender binary. Violence - both real and anticipated - is the most obvious thematic thread, but competing for space and attention is beauty." Mey Rude of Out praised the film as an example of Black trans women "getting to be their unfiltered selves on-screen...and not hold anything back."

In a review for the Los Angeles Times, Michael Rechtshaffen writes, "At once bracingly candid and buoyantly energetic, the first feature by Grammy-winning trans singer-songwriter D. Smith clearly earns the trust of its personable quartet, who require little prodding to share their experiences and philosophies as they navigate decidedly nontraditional paths." Wendy Ide wrote for a review in The Observer, "For all the exaggerated winks in the music choices and provocative shots of beautifully lit buttocks, the film is an open and celebratory space in which the women can tell their stories. Some of them are hilarious, others bruising, all are painfully forthright about the all-too-real dangers they face." According to Teo Bugbee in The New York Times, "Smith's approach grants respect to women who are often dehumanized, even in their most intimate settings." Writing for Collider, Lisa Laman observed that 'Kokomo City' flourished as a work of subverting cinema norms by eschewing traditional documentary standards of othering marginalized voices on-screen, noting 'This is a movie where the personal stories of Mitchell, Carter, Silver, and Doll guide the feature along above all else. It’s a welcome departure from other documentaries about trans individuals and sex workers that largely concentrated on folks outside of those fields.'

The film received the Panorama Audience Award at the 73rd Berlin International Film Festival and also won the NEXT Audience and Innovator Awards at the 2023 Sundance Festival.

=== Accolades ===
Award	Date of ceremony	Category	Recipient(s)	Result	Ref.
Sundance Film Festival	29 January 2023	NEXT Audience Award	Kokomo City	Won	
Sundance Film Festival	29 January 2023	NEXT Innovator Award	Kokomo City	Won	
Berlin International Film Festival	25 February 2023	Panorama: Best Documentary Film	D. Smith	Won	
Berlin International Film Festival	25 February 2023	Teddy Award for Best Documentary/Essay Film	D. Smith	Nominated	
Critics' Choice Documentary Awards	12 November 2023	Best Documentary Feature	Kokomo City	Nominated	
Critics' Choice Documentary Awards	12 November 2023	Best First Documentary Feature	Kokomo City	Nominated	
Critics' Choice Documentary Awards	12 November 2023	Best Score	D. Smith	Nominated	
Critics' Choice Documentary Awards	12 November 2023	Best Cinematography	D. Smith	Nominated	
Critics' Choice Documentary Awards	12 November 2023	Best Editing	D. Smith	Nominated	
IndieWire Critics Poll	11 December 2023	Best Documentary	Kokomo City	1st Place	
Chicago Film Critics Association Awards	12 December 2023	Best Documentary Film	Kokomo City	Won	
Las Vegas Film Critics Society	13 December 2023	Best Documentary	Kokomo City	Nominated	
Indiana Film Journalists Association	17 December 2023	Best Documentary	Kokomo City	Won	
San Diego Film Critics Society	19 December 2023	Best Documentary	Kokomo City	Nominated	
Florida Film Critics Circle Awards	21 December 2023	Best Documentary Film	Kokomo City	Nominated	
Florida Film Critics Circle Awards	21 December 2023	Golden Orange	D. Smith	Won	
National Society of Film Critics Awards	6 January 2024	Best Non-Fiction Film	Kokomo City	Runner-up (Note: Tied with 20 Days in Mariupol.)	
Denver Film Critics Society	12 January 2024	Best Documentary Feature	Kokomo City	Nominated	
Cinema Eye Honors	12 January 2024	Outstanding Non-Fiction Feature	D. Smith, Harris Doran and Bill Butler	Nominated	
Cinema Eye Honors	12 January 2024	Outstanding Direction	D. Smith	Nominated	
Cinema Eye Honors	12 January 2024	Outstanding Cinematography	D. Smith	Nominated	
Cinema Eye Honors	12 January 2024	Outstanding Sound Design	Roni Pillischer	Nominated	
Cinema Eye Honors	12 January 2024	Outstanding Debut	Kokomo City	Won	
Cinema Eye Honors	12 January 2024	The Unforgettables	Daniella Carter, Koko Da Doll, Liyah Mitchell and Dominique Silver	Won	
Black Reel Awards	16 January 2024	Outstanding Documentary Feature	Kokomo City	Nominated	
Black Reel Awards	16 January 2024	Outstanding Cinematography	D. Smith	Nominated	
Black Reel Awards	16 January 2024	Outstanding Editing	D. Smith	Nominated	
Directors Guild of America Awards	10 February 2024	Outstanding Directing – Documentary	D. Smith	Nominated	
Independent Spirit Awards	25 February 2024	Best Documentary Feature	D. Smith, Bill Butler, Harris Doran	Nominated	
Dorian Awards	26 February 2024	Documentary of the Year	Kokomo City	Won	
Dorian Awards	26 February 2024	LGBTQ Documentary of the Year	Kokomo City	Won	
GLAAD Media Awards	14 March 2024	Outstanding Documentary	Kokomo City	Won (Note: Tied with Beyond the Aggressives: 25 Years Later and The Stroll.)	

== Koko Da Doll ==
On April 18, 2023, Rasheeda Williams, better known as Koko Da Doll, was found dead from a gunshot wound in Southwest Atlanta. Smith said Williams "will inspire generations to come and will never be forgotten." Other tributes came from her costars, one of the film's producers Harris Doran, and the Sundance Film Festival. After her death, the film was dedicated to her.
