= Black Reel Award for Outstanding Cinematography =

Award presented annually by the Black Reel Awards

- Awarded for: Outstanding Cinematography
- Country: United States
- Presented by: Black Reel Awards (BRAs)
- First award: Black Reel Awards of 2019
- Most recent winner: Autumn Durald Arkapaw; Sinners (2026)
- Website: blackreelawards.com

This article lists the winners and nominees for the Black Reel Award for Outstanding Cinematography. The award is given to the cinematographer of the nominated film. The category was first introduced at the 19th Annual Black Reel Awards where James Laxton took home the first award in this category for If Beale Street Could Talk.

== Winners and nominees ==
=== 2010s ===
Year	Cinematographer	Film	Ref.
2019	James Laxton	If Beale Street Could Talk	
2019	Chayse Irvin	BlacKkKlansman	
2019	Rachel Morrison	Black Panther	
2019	Sean Bobbitt	Widows	
2019	Tobias A. Schliessler	A Wrinkle in Time	

=== 2020s ===
Year	Cinematographer	Film	Ref.
2020	Tat Racliffe	Queen & Slim	
2020	John Toll	Harriet	
2020	Adam Newport-Berra	The Last Black Man in San Francisco	
2020	Mike Gioulakis	Us	
2020	Drew Daniels	Waves	
2021	Marcell Rev	Malcolm & Marie	
2021	Newton Thomas Sigel	Da 5 Bloods	
2021	Sean Bobbitt	Judas and the Black Messiah	
2021	Tami Reiker	One Night in Miami...	
2021	Hoyte van Hoytema	Tenet	
2022	Bruno Delbonnel	The Tragedy of Macbeth	
2022	Alice Brooks	In the Heights	
2022	Mihai Mălaimare Jr.	The Harder They Fall	
2022	Edu Grau	Passing	
2022	Janusz Kaminski	West Side Story	
2023	Hoyte van Hoytema	Nope	
2023	Autumn Durald Arkapaw	Black Panther: Wakanda Forever	
2023	Robert Richardson	Emancipation	
2023	Bobby Bukowski	Till	
2023	Polly Morgan	The Woman King	
2024	Jomo Fray	All Dirt Roads Taste of Salt	
2024	Jody Lee Lipes	Earth Mama	
2024	D. Smith	Kokomo City	
2024	Olan Collardy	Rye Lane	
2024	Henry Adebonojo and Antonio Rossi	Silver Dollar Road	
2025	Jomo Fray	Nickel Boys	
2025	Wolfgang Held and Moses Tau	Ernest Cole: Lost and Found	
2025	Bryan Gentry	Luther: Never Too Much	
2025	Kira Kelly	Rez Ball	
2025	Bruce Francis Cole	Suncoast	
2026	Autumn Durald Arkapaw	Sinners	
2026	Jermaine Canute Bradley Edwards	My Father's Shadow	
2026	Kira Kelly	Him	
2026	Malik Hassan Sayeed	After the Hunt	
2026	Brittany Shyne	Seeds	

== Multiple nominations and wins ==
=== Multiple nominations ===
2 nominations

- Sean Bobbitt
- Hoyte van Hoytema
- Autumn Durald Arkapaw
- Jomo Fray
- Kira Kelly

=== Multiple wins ===
2 wins

- Jomo Fray
