= Being Mary Tyler Moore =

- Official film poster
- Directed by: James Adolphus
- Produced by: James Adolphus; Debra Martin Chase; Lena Waithe
- Cinematography: James Adolphus
- Edited by: Mariah Rehmet
- Music by: Theodosia Roussos
- Production companies: Fifth Season; Hillman Grad; HBO Documentary Films
- Distributed by: HBO
- Release date: 2023
- Running time: 119 minutes
- Country: United States
- Language: English

Being Mary Tyler Moore is a 2023 American biographical documentary film about the actress Mary Tyler Moore. It is directed and produced by James Adolphus.

== Cast ==
- Mary Tyler Moore (archive footage)
- James L. Brooks
- Rob Reiner
- Ed Asner
- Carol Burnett (archive footage)

== Reception ==
On the review aggregator website Rotten Tomatoes, the film holds an approval rating of 97%, based on 35 reviews. The website's consensus reads, "Being Mary Tyler Moore is an entertaining yet unflinching documentary which blends celebration with candor, using Moore's own voice to illuminate both her joyful cultural legacy and the complexities beneath her carefully crafted public image." On Metacritic, the film holds a rating of 66 out of 100, based on 7 critics, indicating "generally favorable" reviews.

== See also ==
- The Mary Tyler Moore Show
