= Will You Look at Me =

- Directed by: Shuli Huang
- Written by: Shuli Huang
- Produced by: Shuli Huang
- Edited by: Shuli Huang
- Release date: May 2022
- Running time: 20min
- Country: China

Will You Look at Me (Chinese: 当我望向你的时候; pinyin: Dāng wǒ wàng xiàng nǐ de shíhòu, lit.'When I Look At You') is a 2022 Chinese short film directed by Shuli Huang. The twenty minute documentary explores the director's identity through his relationship with his mother. The short premiered at the 2022 Semaine de la Critique at Cannes Film Festival, where it won the Queer Palm Award, and has been presented in a number of festivals, including Melbourne International Film Festival and Hong Kong International Film Festival.

== Plot ==
As he returns to his hometown, a young Chinese filmmaker searches for himself by talking to his mother, and finally having a long due conversation that will dive them together into a quest for acceptance and love.

== Reception ==
Since its premiere, the film has been selected in various festivals and academies around the world:

Year	Festivals	Award/Category	Status
2022	Cannes Film Festival	Queer Palm - Short Film	Won
2022	Melbourne International Film Festival	Best Documentary Short Film	Won
2022	Hong Kong International Film Festival	Best Short Film	Nominated
2022	Concorto Film Festival	Young Jury's Special Mention	Won
2022	Desenzano Film Festival	Best Short Film Award	Won
2022	DOK Leipzig	Golden Dove Short Documentary Film	Won
2022	Golden Horse Awards	Best Documentary Short Film	Won
