= 20 Days in Mariupol =

2023 Ukrainian documentary film by Mstyslav Chernov

- Theatrical release poster
- Ukrainian: 20 днів у Маріуполі
- Directed by: Mstyslav Chernov
- Written by: Mstyslav Chernov
- Produced by: Raney Aronson-Rath; Mstyslav Chernov; Derl McCrudden; Michelle Mizner
- Cinematography: Mstyslav Chernov; Evgeniy Maloletka
- Edited by: Michelle Mizner
- Music by: Jordan Dykstra
- Production companies: Associated Press; PBS Frontline
- Distributed by: PBS Distribution
- Release date: 20 January 2023 (Sundance)
- Running time: 94 minutes
- Country: Ukraine
- Languages: Ukrainian; English; Russian

20 Days in Mariupol (Ukrainian: «20 днів у Маріуполі», romanized: 20 dniv u Mariupoli) is a 2023 Ukrainian documentary film with footage from the first several weeks of the Russian invasion of Ukraine directed by Mstyslav Chernov.

The film had its world premiere at the 2023 Sundance Film Festival, where it won the Sundance World Cinema Documentary Competition. The film has received critical acclaim and was named one of the top five documentary films of 2023 by the National Board of Review. It was selected as the Ukrainian submission for the Academy Award for Best International Feature Film at the 96th Academy Awards, but it was instead nominated in the Best Documentary Feature Film category and went on to win the award. The film was also nominated for two BAFTAs and won one of them, also won a Directors Guild of America Award and Ukrainian National Film Academy Award.

The film was screened at the start of the 78th session of the UN General Assembly.

== Synopsis ==
The film tells the story of the twenty days Chernov spent with his colleagues in the besieged city of Mariupol in February–March 2022 in the first weeks of the full-scale Russian invasion of Ukraine. Chernov compiled footage that he collected in Mariupol together with the team from PBS's Frontline and the Associated Press (AP).

== Production ==
As the full-scale Russian invasion of Ukraine began on 24 February 2022, the Associated Press team documented the Russian siege and the resulting humanitarian disaster, war crimes by Russian forces, including mass murder of civilian casualties. In particular, AP was the first to show the consequences of Russia's bombing of Mariupol maternity hospital No. 3. Materials were periodically sent to the editorial office from the only place in Mariupol where there was still an online connection – under the stairs near the crushed grocery store, so it was possible to transfer ten percent of the filmed material. The rest of the material, in particular 30 hours of Mstislav Chernov's video, was taken out of Mariupol by the AP team on 15 March 2022 through the humanitarian corridor. By that time, Chernov's AP crew were the last journalists in the city.

The film from the materials of Chernov was created by the PBS's Frontline team.

== Release ==
UK-based documentary film-distribution company Dogwoof oversees international sales rights, and handles all worldwide sales excluding North America, where PBS Distribution has acquired rights.

The film was released in selected theaters in the US on 14 July 2023. In Ukraine, the film was released in selected theaters on 31 August 2023. Pre-premiere screenings took place in various cities throughout Ukraine, including in Kyiv (Bouquet Kyiv Stage 2023 festival) and Lviv (NGO "Lviv Media Forum"). On 21 April 2024 film was released on Netflix.

=== Screening controversy in Serbia ===
In October, the film was to be shown at the Serbian Beldocs festival at the Lazarevac Cultural Center in the suburbs of Belgrade. On 10 October, far-right ultra-nationalist Serbian Radical Party called for the cancellation of the screening of the "anti-Russian propaganda film of the Kyiv regime", which is "an attempt by the West to change the attitude of the Serbian people towards brotherly Russia". On 12 October, festival administration cancelled the screening, stressing that "Beldocs is not behind this decision and did not participate in it". Eventually, the film was shown in Belgrade on 21 February 2024.

== Box office ==
On the first weekend of September 2023, the film collected more than 530,000 UAH (c. US$15,000) at the Ukrainian box office, becoming the highest-grossing Ukrainian documentary in history. Overall by March 2024, the film's box office was $20,500.

== Critical reception ==
On review aggregator Rotten Tomatoes, the film holds an approval rating of 100% based on 71 reviews, with an average rating of 8.8/10. The website's critics consensus reads, "20 Days in Mariupol offers a grueling but vital look at the devastating impact of war." On Metacritic, the film has a weighted average score of 83 out of 100 based on nineteen reviews, indicating "universal acclaim".

Dennis Harvey of Variety wrote that "This is bleak but essential viewing", and that "this nonfiction feature may not have a simple narrative arc, but the director's unpretentious first-person narration and the intensity of the war-crimes evidence compiled make it riveting nonetheless." Frank Scheck of The Hollywood Reporter wrote that 20 Days in Mariupol "is a particularly immersive example of the genre, chronicling the weekslong siege of the titular Ukrainian city by Russian forces. [...] What comes through most vividly, other than the human tragedy on display, is the vital importance of war correspondents and the courage and ingenuity they must possess in order to work under such life-threatening conditions." Randy Myers of The Mercury News gave the film 3.5/4 stars, calling it a "grim, essential piece of journalism" and "an immersive account from Ukrainian journalists at the AP who spent nearly three weeks embedded in a port city that was targeted by Russia and mercilessly attacked."

Matt Zoller Seitz of RogerEbert.com gave the film three-and-a-half out of four stars, stating that "It goes on a short list of great documentaries that the viewer will never want to watch again. ... This is a dispatch from hell on earth. The fragmented, chaotic, imprecise nature of it is a revelation."

=== Accolades ===
20 Days in Mariupol was included in competition of the Sundance Film Festival in the World Cinema Documentary category. The world premiere took place at the festival in January 2023. The film won the Audience Award in the World Cinema Documentary category.

The film received more than 20 awards and was nominated for BAFTAs in 2 categories, and won in one of them, Academy Awards in one category and won Directors Guild of America Awards. It also was awarded the Alfred I. duPont-Columbia University Award in 2024.

Award	Date of ceremony	Category	Recipient(s)	Result	Ref.
Sundance Film Festival	29 January 2023	World Cinema: Documentary Competition	20 Days in Mariupol	Nominated	
Sundance Film Festival	29 January 2023	World Cinema Audience Award: Documentary	20 Days in Mariupol	Won	
Cinema for Peace Awards	24 February 2023	Most Valuable Documentary of the Year	20 Days in Mariupol	Won	
Cleveland International Film Festival	1 April 2023	Greg Gund Memorial Standing Up Award	20 Days in Mariupol	Won	
Doc Edge	3 June 2023	Best International Feature	20 Days in Mariupol	Nominated	
Doc Edge	3 June 2023	Best International Director	Mstyslav Chernov	Won	
Doc Edge	3 June 2023	Best International Editing	Michelle Mizner	Won	
DocuDays UA	8 June 2023	DOCU/UKRAINE Competition Jury Award	20 Days in Mariupol	Won	
DocuDays UA	8 June 2023	Audience Award	20 Days in Mariupol	Won	
Sheffield DocFest	19 June 2023	Tim Hetherington Award	20 Days in Mariupol	Won	
Athens International Film Festival	9 October 2023	Best Documentary	20 Days in Mariupol	Nominated	
Athens International Film Festival	9 October 2023	Best Documentary – Special Mention	20 Days in Mariupol	Won	
Critics' Choice Documentary Awards	12 November 2023	Best Documentary Feature	20 Days in Mariupol	Nominated	
Critics' Choice Documentary Awards	12 November 2023	Best First Documentary Feature	20 Days in Mariupol	Won	
Critics' Choice Documentary Awards	12 November 2023	Best Political Documentary	20 Days in Mariupol	Won	
Critics' Choice Documentary Awards	12 November 2023	Best Narration	Mstyslav Chernov	Nominated	
Critics' Choice Documentary Awards	12 November 2023	Best Editing	Michelle Mizner	Nominated	
Gotham Independent Film Awards	27 November 2023	Best Documentary Feature	20 Days in Mariupol	Nominated	
National Board of Review	6 December 2023	Top 5 Documentary Films	20 Days in Mariupol	Won (Note: This award does not have a single winner, but recognizes multiple films.)	
Washington D.C. Area Film Critics Association Awards	10 December 2023	Best Documentary	20 Days in Mariupol	Nominated	
IndieWire Critics Poll	11 December 2023	Best Documentary	20 Days in Mariupol	3rd Place	
Chicago Film Critics Association Awards	12 December 2023	Best Documentary Film	20 Days in Mariupol	Nominated	
Indiana Film Journalists Association	17 December 2023	Best Documentary	20 Days in Mariupol	Runner-up	
North Texas Film Critics Association	18 December 2023	Best Documentary Film	20 Days in Mariupol	Nominated	
Dallas–Fort Worth Film Critics Association	18 December 2023	Best Documentary Film	20 Days in Mariupol	Second	
Toronto Film Critics Association	17 December 2023	Allan King Documentary Award	20 Days in Mariupol	Won	
San Diego Film Critics Society	19 December 2023	Best Documentary	20 Days in Mariupol	Runner-up	
Nevada Film Critics Society	23 December 2023	Best Documentary	20 Days in Mariupol	Won	
Alliance of Women Film Journalists	3 January 2024	Best Documentary	20 Days in Mariupol	Nominated	
Astra Film and Creative Arts Awards	6 January 2024	Best Documentary Feature	20 Days in Mariupol	Nominated	
National Society of Film Critics Awards	6 January 2024	Best Non-Fiction Film	20 Days in Mariupol	Runner-up (Note: Tied with Kokomo City.)	
Seattle Film Critics Society Awards	8 January 2024	Best Documentary Feature	20 Days in Mariupol	Won	
San Francisco Bay Area Film Critics Circle Awards	9 January 2024	Best Documentary Film	20 Days in Mariupol	Won	
Austin Film Critics Association Awards	10 January 2024	Best Documentary	20 Days in Mariupol	Nominated	
London Critics' Circle Awards	4 February 2024	Documentary of the Year	20 Days in Mariupol	Won	
Denver Film Critics Society	12 January 2024	Best Documentary Feature	20 Days in Mariupol	Nominated	
Cinema Eye Honors	12 January 2024	Outstanding Non-Fiction Feature	Mstyslav Chernov, Michelle Mizner, Raney Aronson Rath and Derl McCrudden	Nominated	
Cinema Eye Honors	12 January 2024	Outstanding Debut	20 Days in Mariupol	Nominated	
Cinema Eye Honors	12 January 2024	Audience Choice Prize	20 Days in Mariupol	Nominated	
Cinema Eye Honors	12 January 2024	Outstanding Editing	Michelle Mizner	Nominated	
Cinema Eye Honors	12 January 2024	Outstanding Production	Mstyslav Chernov, Michelle Mizner, Raney Aronson Rath and Derl McCrudden	Won	
Houston Film Critics Society	22 January 2024	Best Documentary Feature	20 Days in Mariupol	Nominated	
Kansas City Film Critics Circle	27 January 2024	Best Documentary	20 Days in Mariupol	Won (Note: Tied with Taylor Swift: The Eras Tour.)	
Directors Guild of America Awards	10 February 2024	Outstanding Directing – Documentary	Mstyslav Chernov	Won	
British Film Editors Cut Above Awards	16 February 2024	Best Edited Single Documentary or Non-Fiction Programme	Michelle Mizner	Nominated	
British Film Editors Cut Above Awards	16 February 2024	Best Edited Current Affairs	Michelle Mizner	Won	
Satellite Awards	3 March 2024	Best Motion Picture – Documentary	20 Days in Mariupol	Nominated	
British Academy Film Awards	18 February 2024	Best Film Not in the English Language	Mstyslav Chernov and Raney Aronson-Rath	Nominated	
British Academy Film Awards	18 February 2024	Best Documentary	Mstyslav Chernov and Raney Aronson-Rath	Won	
Producers Guild of America Awards	25 February 2024	Outstanding Producer of Documentary Theatrical Motion Pictures	20 Days in Mariupol	Nominated	
American Cinema Editors	3 March 2024	Best Edited Documentary (Theatrical)	Michelle Mizner	Nominated	
Academy Awards	10 March 2024	Best Documentary Feature Film	Mstyslav Chernov, Michelle Mizner and Raney Aronson-Rath	Won	
Peabody Awards	9 May 2024	Documentary	20 Days in Mariupol	Won	
Edward R. Murrow Award	19 August 2024	Feature Documentary — Network TV	20 Days in Mariupol	Won	
International Broadcasting Convention Award	29 August 2024	International Honour for Excellence	Mstyslav Chernov for 20 Days in Mariupol	Won	
Golden Dzyga	12 September 2024	Best Film	20 Days in Mariupol	Won	
Golden Dzyga	12 September 2024	Best Documentary	20 Days in Mariupol	Won	
Grierson Awards	7 November 2024	Best Current Affairs Documentary	20 Days in Mariupol	Won	
Grierson Awards	7 November 2024	Best Cinema Documentary	20 Days in Mariupol	Won	
Polish Film Awards	10 March 2025	Best European Film	Mstyslav Chernov	Nominated	

== See also ==
- List of films about the Russo-Ukrainian War
- List of submissions to the 96th Academy Awards for Best International Feature Film
- List of Ukrainian submissions for the Academy Award for Best International Feature Film
