= The Barber of Little Rock =

2023 documentary short film by John Hoffman and Christine Turner

The Barber of Little Rock is a 2023 documentary short film by John Hoffman and Christine Turner.

== Summary ==
The documentary film tells the story of Arlo Washington, an African American barber in Little Rock, Arkansas who founded a nonprofit community bank to try to lessen the racial wealth gap.

== Accolades ==
The film was nominated in the Best Documentary Short Film category of the 96th Academy Awards.
