= PBS Distribution =

Home video distribution company

- Formerly: PBS Venture; PBS Home Video; Public Media Distribution
- Type: Joint venture
- Industry: Public TV
- Founded: September 7, 1977; 49 years ago in New York City, New York, U.S.
- Headquarters: Crystal City, Virginia; Boston, Massachusetts, United States
- Owners: PBS; WGBH Educational Foundation
- Divisions: PBS International; PBS America (JV)
- Website: www.pbsdistribution.org

PBS Distribution (PBSd), formerly known as PBS Ventures, PBS Home Video, and Public Media Distribution, is the home distribution unit of the American television network PBS. The company manages streaming channels, video on demand releases, and sells home videos of PBS series and movies and PBS Kids series in various formats, as well as programming from other public television distributors such as American Public Television and the National Educational Telecommunications Association.

It is jointly owned by the Public Broadcasting Service and the WGBH Educational Foundation. PBSd manages the PBS Masterpiece channel on Amazon's Prime Video Channels.

It is currently distributing PBS programs and movies on DVD and Blu-ray (through its distribution partnership with Studio Distribution Services), digital downloads, and streaming media and PBS Kids programs on DVD and digital downloads. In 2017 independent films produced by PBSd were added for theatrical distribution and home video releases.

== History ==
Established on September 7, 1977, the PBS Home Video, Inc. company originally distributed and sold VHS and Betamax tapes simply on their own.

Starting in 1989, PBS secured a deal with Pacific Arts to distribute PBS Home Video's products. In 1994, PBS moved to distribution through Turner Home Entertainment. In 1996, (after Turner Home Entertainment's parent company merged with Time Warner), PBS moved to Warner Home Video. Then in 2004, PBS moved its distribution to Paramount Home Entertainment.

PBS Home Video was renamed PBS Distribution—PBSd in 2009, and became an independent distributor again in 2011, shortly after its home video distribution deal with Paramount got expired. PBSd is jointly owned by PBS and the WGBH Educational Foundation. It is currently distributing PBS programs and movies on DVD, Blu-ray, digital downloads, and video on demand and PBS Kids programs on DVD and digital downloads. In 2017 independent films produced by PBSd were added for cinema and home video releases. PBS International offers factual content for broadcast, cable, and satellite services internationally.

On November 1, 2011, PBS UK was launched on BSkyB. Canadian-born entrepreneur David Lyons and PBS Distribution formed a joint venture to run the channel.

=== Independent films ===
After a backlash from filmmakers over WNET's attempts to move independent documentary series to its secondary station, PBS took feedback from the documentary community and developed an indie film strategy.

Through Independent Lens, PBS acquired Stanley Nelson's documentary film The Black Panthers: Vanguard of the Revolution. The history of The Black Panthers was especially timely due to the contemporary Black Lives Matter movement's growth. The film was first released in theaters in late 2015, then had a special nationwide public television premiere in late 2016.

PBSd expanded its operation to included theatrical distribution of documentary films by hiring Erin Owens as PBS Distribution's Head of Theatrical Distribution; and Emily Rothschild as Director of Theatrical Acquisitions and Marketing. Owens and Rothschild had just worked with PBS on Stanley Nelson's The Black Panthers distribution.

The operations expansion of PBSd was announced at the Sundance Film Festival on 19 January 2017. The company plans to get theatrical and non-theatrical rights for up to six feature-length documentaries to release per year.

PBSd put British show, Jamestown as a streaming first run on PBS Passport and PBS Masterpiece as of March 23, 2018.

== See also ==
- PBS−Public Broadcasting Service topics
- WGBH Educational Foundation topics
