= Smoke Sauna Sisterhood =

2023 film by Anna Hints

- Theatrical release poster
- Estonian: Savvusanna sõsarad
- Directed by: Anna Hints
- Written by: Anna Hints
- Produced by: Marianne Ostrat
- Cinematography: Ants Tammik
- Edited by: Qutaiba Barhamji; Anna Hints; Hendrik Mägar; Martin Männik; Tushar Prakash
- Music by: Edvard Egilsson; EETER
- Production companies: Alexandra Film; Kepler 22 Productions; Ursus Parvus
- Release dates: 22 January 2023 (Sundance); 23 March 2023 (Estonia)
- Running time: 90 minutes
- Countries: Estonia; France; Iceland
- Languages: Estonian; Seto; Võro
- Box office: $432,476

Smoke Sauna Sisterhood (Võro: Savvusanna sõsarad, lit. 'Sisters of the smoke sauna') is a 2023 documentary film written and directed by Anna Hints in her feature directorial debut. It is about a group of women who gather in a smoke sauna where they clean the dirt from their ashamed and aching bodies. It was selected as the Estonian entry for the Best International Feature Film at the 96th Academy Awards. It is a co-production between Estonia, France and Iceland.

Smoke Sauna Sisterhood had its world premiere at the Sundance Film Festival on 22 January 2023, where it competed in the World Cinema Documentary Competition and won the Directing Award at the World Cinema Documentary Competition.

== Release ==
=== Festivals ===
Smoke Sauna Sisterhood had its world premiere on 22 January 2023, at the Sundance Film Festival, then it was screened on 17 March of that year at the Copenhagen International Documentary Film Festival, on 31 March at the Stockfish Film Festival, on 23 April at the San Francisco International Film Festival, on 13 May at the Millennium Docs Against Gravity, on 18 May at the Barcelona Documentary Film Festival, on 19 May at the Seattle International Film Festival, on 24 June at the Filmfest München, on 31 July at the New Zealand International Film Festival, on 4 August at the Melbourne International Film Festival, on 29 September in the Documentary Competition at the Zurich Film Festival, and on the 7th of October at the CinEast Film Festival.

=== Theatrical ===
It was commercially released on 23 March 2023, in Estonian theaters. It was released at cinemas in the UK and Ireland from 13 October 2023.

== Reception ==
=== Critical reception ===
On the review aggregator website Rotten Tomatoes, 98% of 48 critics' reviews are positive, with an average rating of 7.7/10. The website's consensus reads: "Running the gamut from tears to laughter, Smoke Sauna Sisterhood finds cinematic poetry in the simple act of observing conversation." Metacritic, which uses a weighted average, assigned the film a score of 82 out of 100, based on 7 critics, indicating "universal acclaim".

=== Accolades ===
Year	Award / Festival	Category	Recipient	Result	Ref.
2023	Sundance Film Festival	World Cinema Grand Jury Prize: Documentary	Smoke Sauna Sisterhood	Nominated	
2023	Sundance Film Festival	World Cinema Documentary - Directing Award	Anna Hints	Won	
2023	Copenhagen International Documentary Film Festival	Next:Wave Award	Smoke Sauna Sisterhood	Nominated	
2023	Hong Kong International Film Festival	Documentary Competition - Firebird Award	Smoke Sauna Sisterhood	Nominated	
2023	San Francisco International Film Festival	Best Documentary Feature	Smoke Sauna Sisterhood	Won	
2023	Filmfest München	CineRebels Award	Smoke Sauna Sisterhood	Nominated	
2023	2023 Cinéfest Sudbury International Film Festival	Outstanding Female-Led Feature Film	Smoke Sauna Sisterhood	Won	
2023	19th Zurich Film Festival	Documentary Competition	Smoke Sauna Sisterhood	Nominated	
2023	27th Tallinn Black Nights Film Festival	Best Baltic Film	Smoke Sauna Sisterhood	Won	
2023	European Film Awards	Best Documentary	Smoke Sauna Sisterhood	Won	
2023	CinEast	Special Mention	Smoke Sauna Sisterhood	Won	
2023	IDA Documentary Awards	Best Cinematography	Ants Tammik	Won	
2023	IDA Documentary Awards	Best Writing	Anna Hints	Nominated	
2023	Eurimages Audentia Award	Beldocs	Anna Hints	Won	
2024	17th Cinema Eye Honors	Outstanding Cinematography	Ants Tammik	Won	
2024	17th Cinema Eye Honors	Outstanding Sound Design	Huldar Freyr Arnarson and Edvard Egilsson	Nominated	
2024	17th Cinema Eye Honors	Outstanding Debut	Smoke Sauna Sisterhood	Nominated	
2024	17th Cinema Eye Honors	Audience Choice Prize	Smoke Sauna Sisterhood	Nominated	
2024	35th PGA Awards	Outstanding Producer of Documentary Theatrical Motion Pictures	Marianne Ostrat	Nominated	
2024	Cinema for Peace awards	Dove Award for Women's Empowerment	Anna Hints	Nominated	

== See also ==
- List of submissions to the 96th Academy Awards for Best International Feature Film
- List of Estonian submissions for the Academy Award for Best International Feature Film
