= Michelle Mizner =

American film producer and editor

- Born: Tulare, California, U.S.
- Occupations: Film producer; Film editor
- Known for: Producing 20 Days in Mariupol

Michelle Mizner is an American film producer and editor. She produced 20 Days in Mariupol, which won the Best Documentary Feature Award at the 96th Academy Awards.

She produces and edits Frontline, PBS's flagship investigative journalism series.

== Early life ==
Mizner was born in Tulare, California, and studied at Tulare Union High School. She joined California State University, Northridge's Cinema and Television Arts (CTVA) and graduated in filmmaking. She started making short videos in high school before she went to film school.

== Career ==
She produces and edits Frontline, PBS's flagship investigative journalism series.

In 2023, she produced and edited the Ukrainian documentary feature film 20 Days in Mariupol, which premiered at the 2023 Sundance Film Festival. She received numerous accolades for producing and editing the documentary including the Best Documentary Feature Award at the 96th Academy Awards. She told in an interview that she used Avid Media Composer to edit the film, which she also uses for Frontline.

In 2025, Minzer served as producer and editor on 2000 Meters to Andriivka which had its world premiere at the 2025 Sundance Film Festival.

== Filmography ==
Films

- 2023 – 20 Days in Mariupol (producer, editor)
- 2025 - 2000 Meters to Andriivka (producer, editor)

Television

- 2014–present – Frontline (producer, editor)
