= Koko Da Doll =

American performance artist

Rasheeda Williams (1987 or 1988 – April 18, 2023), also known as Koko Da Doll and Hollywood Koko, was an American performance artist. She is known for starring in the documentary Kokomo City, a film that premiered at the 2023 Sundance Film Festival and featured her and three other Black trans women discussing their lives and experiences as sex workers. After her death, the film was dedicated to her.

== Biography ==
Williams spent her childhood in Southside College Park, and was based in Atlanta, including as a teenager. As a rap artist, she released the singles "Trick" in 2020 and "Bulletproof" in 2022. A song she created was featured in the sixth season of The Chi in 2023.

=== Kokomo City ===
Williams was one of the four Black trans women featured in the documentary Kokomo City, which premiered at the 2023 Sundance Film Festival in January 2023. After the premiere, Williams thanked director D. Smith and associate producer Dustin Lohman on Instagram, writing, "I will be the reason there’s more opportunities and doors opening for transgender girls" and "What you've done here for me is going to save a lot of lives."

After the film won two awards at the Sundance Film Festival, Lovia Gyarkye wrote in a The Hollywood Reporter review about the stars of the documentary: "Mitchell, Carter, Silver and Koko Da Doll take us through their introductions to sex work, try to reconcile the demands of survival with the risks of the job, offer the most authentic versions of themselves and express their variegated relationships to Black cis people." In the film, Williams discusses sex work as a way for her to help avoid homelessness for her mother, sister, and herself. After the theatrical release of the film, Teo Bugbee wrote in a The New York Times review, "Koko brims with vitality, ambition and insight. This is not a maudlin film; instead it is a movie with heroines who fight tooth and nail for their lives and their self-worth."

=== Death and legacy ===
At around 11pm on April 18, 2023, Williams was found dead with a gunshot wound on a sidewalk near Holmes Shopping Plaza in Southwest Atlanta. On April 22, 2023, a candlelight vigil was held at the location where she was found. On April 27, 2023, a teenage suspect was arrested on suspicion of murder, aggravated assault, and possession of a firearm in the commission of a felony, and Atlanta police indicated a hate crime investigation continued. Filmmaker Magazine referred to her death as "a dismal reminder of the constant threat of violence that Black trans women disproportionately face."

Kokomo City has been dedicated to Williams following her death. At the 2023 BET Awards, Williams was honored during the In Memoriam part of the program.
