= Still: A Michael J. Fox Movie =

2023 documentary film

- Television release poster
- Directed by: Davis Guggenheim
- Produced by: Davis Guggenheim; Annetta Marion; Jonathan King; Will Cohen
- Starring: Michael J. Fox
- Cinematography: C. Kim Miles
- Edited by: Michael Harte
- Music by: John Powell
- Production company: Concordia Studio
- Distributed by: Apple TV+
- Release dates: January 20, 2023 (Sundance); May 12, 2023 (United States)
- Running time: 95 minutes
- Country: United States
- Language: English

Still: A Michael J. Fox Movie is a 2023 American documentary film directed by Davis Guggenheim about the life of actor Michael J. Fox and his struggle with Parkinson's disease. The film premiered at the 2023 Sundance Film Festival on January 20, and was then released on May 12, 2023, on Apple TV+.

The project won the award for Best Documentary Film from the National Board of Review and received seven nominations at the 75th Primetime Emmy Awards, including for Outstanding Documentary Or Nonfiction Special, and five nominations (eventually winning them all) at the 8th Critics' Choice Documentary Awards, including Best Documentary Feature.

== Reception ==
On the review aggregator website Rotten Tomatoes, 99% of 154 critics' reviews are positive. The website's consensus reads: "Poignant and profound, Still: A Michael J. Fox Movie offers a captivating inside look at the life and career of a beloved entertainer." Metacritic, which uses a weighted average, assigned the film a score of 78 out of 100, based on 35 critics, indicating "generally favorable" reviews.

Christy Lemire of RogerEbert.com gave the film three and a half out of four stars and wrote, "This could have been mawkish—an 'eat your vegetables' movie about an inspirational figure overcoming adversity. But keeping Fox's self-effacing, no-nonsense voice as a through-line consistently buoys Still."

=== Accolades ===
Year	Award	Category	Nominee(s)	Result	Ref.
2023	Critics' Choice Documentary Awards	Best Documentary Feature	Still: A Michael J. Fox Movie	Won	
2023	Critics' Choice Documentary Awards	Best Biographical Documentary	Still: A Michael J. Fox Movie	Won	
2023	Critics' Choice Documentary Awards	Best Director	Davis Guggenheim	Won	
2023	Critics' Choice Documentary Awards	Best Narration	Michael J. Fox	Won	
2023	Critics' Choice Documentary Awards	Best Editing	Michael Harte	Won	
2023	Hollywood Music in Media Awards	Best Original Score in a Documentary	John Powell	Won	
2024	Primetime Emmy Awards	Outstanding Documentary or Nonfiction Special	Nelle Fortenberry, Laurene Powell Jobs, Nicole Stott, Davis Guggenheim, Annetta Marion, Jonathan King and Will Cohen	Won	
2024	Primetime Emmy Awards	Outstanding Cinematography for a Nonfiction Program	C. Kim Miles, Clair Popkin and Julia Liu	Nominated	
2024	Primetime Emmy Awards	Outstanding Directing for a Documentary/Nonfiction Program	Davis Guggenheim	Won	
2024	Primetime Emmy Awards	Outstanding Picture Editing for a Nonfiction Program	Michael Harte	Won	
2024	Primetime Emmy Awards	Outstanding Music Composition for a Documentary Series or Special (Original Dramatic Score)	John Powell	Won	
2024	Primetime Emmy Awards	Outstanding Sound Editing for a Nonfiction or Reality Program (Single Or Multi-Camera)	Michael Feuser, Rich Bologna, Wyatt Sprague, Heather Gross, Bill Bernstein	Nominated	
2024	Primetime Emmy Awards	Outstanding Sound Mixing for a Nonfiction Program (Single or Multi-Camera)	Skip Lievsay, Benjamin Berger, Martin Kittappa and Lily van Leeuwen	Nominated	
2024	British Academy Film Awards	Best Documentary	Still: A Michael J. Fox Movie	Nominated	
2024	Cinema for Peace	Dove on Global Health	Still: A Michael J. Fox Movie	Nominated	
