= The 1619 Project: A New Origin Story =

2021 anthology by Nikole Hannah-Jones and The New York Times Magazine

- First edition cover
- Editors: Nikole Hannah-Jones; Caitlin Roper; Ilena Silverman; Jake Silverstein
- Language: English
- Series: The 1619 Project
- Genre: Anthology
- Published: 2021
- Publisher: One World (imprint of Random House)
- Media type: Print (hardcover), e-book, audiobook
- Pages: 624
- ISBN: 978-0-593-23057-2 First edition hardcover
- OCLC: 1250435664
- Dewey Decimal: 973
- LC Class: E441 .A15 2021

The 1619 Project: A New Origin Story is a 2021 anthology of essays and poetry, published by One World (an imprint of Random House) on November 16, 2021. It is a book-length expansion of the essays presented in the 1619 Project issue of The New York Times Magazine in August 2019. The book was created by Nikole Hannah-Jones and The New York Times Magazine, and is edited by Hannah-Jones, Caitlin Roper, Ilena Silverman and Jake Silverstein.

On January 26, 2023, The 1619 Project documentary television series based on the original project and book debuted on Hulu.

== Contents ==
Section	Writer	Genre
Preface: "Origins"	Nikole Hannah-Jones	Nonfiction
"The White Lion"	Claudia Rankine	Poem
Chapter 1: "Democracy"	Nikole Hannah-Jones	Nonfiction
"Daughters of Azimuth"	Nikky Finney	Poem
"Loving Me"	Vievee Francis	Poem
Chapter 2: "Race"	Dorothy Roberts	Nonfiction
"Conjured"	Honorée Fanonne Jeffers	Poem
"A Ghazalled Sentence After 'My People...Hold On' by Eddie Kendricks and the Negro Act of 1740",	Terrance Hayes	Poem
Chapter 3: "Sugar"	Khalil Gibran Muhammad	Nonfiction
"First to Rise"	Yusef Komunyakaa	Poem
"proof [dear Phillis]"	Eve L. Ewing	Poem
Chapter 4: "Fear"	Leslie Alexander and Michelle Alexander	Nonfiction
"Freedom Is Not for Myself Alone"	Robert Jones Jr.	Fiction
"Other Persons"	Reginald Dwayne Betts	Poem
Chapter 5: "Dispossession"	Tiya Miles	Nonfiction
"Trouble the Water"	Barry Jenkins	Fiction
"Sold South"	Jesmyn Ward	Fiction
Chapter 6: "Capitalism"	Matthew Desmond	Nonfiction
"Fort Mose"	Tyehimba Jess	Poem
"Before His Execution"	Tim Seibles	Poem
Chapter 7: "Politics"	Jamelle Bouie	Nonfiction
"We as People"	Cornelius Eady	Poem
"A Letter to Harriet Hayden"	Lynn Nottage	Monologue
Chapter 8: "Citizenship"	Martha S. Jones	Nonfiction
"The Camp"	Darryl Pinckney	Fiction
"An Absolute Massacre"	ZZ Packer	Fiction
Chapter 9: "Self-defense"	Carol Anderson	Nonfiction
"Like to the Rushing of a Mighty Wind"	Tracy K. Smith	Poem
"no car for colored [+] ladies (or, miss wells goes off [on] the rails)"	Evie Shockley	Poem
Chapter 10: "Punishment"	Bryan Stevenson	Nonfiction
"Race Riot"	Forrest Hamer	Poem
"Greenwood"	Jasmine Mans	Poem
Chapter 11: "Inheritance"	Trymaine Lee	Nonfiction
"The New Negro"	A. Van Jordan	Poem
"Bad Blood"	Yaa Gyasi	Fiction
Chapter 12: "Medicine"	Linda Villarosa	Nonfiction
"1955"	Danez Smith	Poem
"From Behind the Counter"	Terry McMillan	Fiction
Chapter 13: "Church"	Anthea Butler	Nonfiction
"Youth Sunday"	Rita Dove	Poem
"On 'Brevity'"	Camille T. Dungy	Poem
Chapter 14: "Music"	Wesley Morris	Nonfiction
"Quotidian"	Natasha Trethewey	Poem
"The Panther Is a Virtual Animal"	Joshua Bennett	Poem
Chapter 15: "Healthcare"	Jeneen Interlandi	Nonfiction
"Unbought, Unbossed, Unbothered"	Nafissa Thompson-Spires	Fiction
"Crazy When You Smile"	Patricia Smith	Poem
Chapter 16: "Traffic"	Kevin M. Kruse	Nonfiction
"Rainbows Aren't Real, Are They?"	Kiese Laymon	Poem
"A Surname to Honor Their Mother"	Gregory Pardlo	Poem
Chapter 17: "Progress"	Ibram X. Kendi	Nonfiction
"At the Superdome After the Storm Has Passed"	Clint Smith	Poem
"Mother and Son"	Jason Reynolds	Fiction
Chapter 18: "Justice"	Nikole Hannah-Jones	Nonfiction
"Progress Report"	Sonia Sanchez	Poem

== Reception ==
The 1619 Project debuted at number one on The New York Times nonfiction best-seller list for the week ending November 20, 2021.

It received a starred review from Kirkus Reviews and was a finalist for the Kirkus Prize. Booklist included it in a list of the magazine's top 10 history books of 2021. An American Heritage survey found that The 1619 Project was one of its readership's 15 favorite books published in 2021.

== See also ==
- The 1619 Project: Born on the Water
