= The 1619 Project (disambiguation) =

The 1619 Project is a long-form journalism project started by The New York Times Magazine.

The 1619 Project may also refer to:

- The 1619 Project (TV series), a 2023 documentary television series
- The 1619 Project: A New Origin Story, a 2021 book
- The 1619 Project: Born on the Water, a 2021 picture book
