= The 1619 Project =

2019 New York Times project

- The 1619 Project logo
- Author: Nikole Hannah-Jones
- Language: English
- Genre: Long-form journalism
- Publisher: The New York Times
- Publication date: August 2019
- Publication place: United States
- Followed by: The 1619 Project: A New Origin Story

The 1619 Project is a long-form journalistic historiographical work that takes a critical view of traditionally revered figures and events in American history, including the Patriots in the American Revolution and the Founding Fathers, along with Abraham Lincoln and the Union during the Civil War, as well as the development of America's economic, political, and social institutions. It was developed by Nikole Hannah-Jones, writers from The New York Times, and The New York Times Magazine. It focused on subjects of slavery and the founding of the United States, taking its name from the year that the first enslaved Africans arrived to colonial Virginia. The first publication from the project was in The New York Times Magazine of August 2019. The project developed an educational curriculum, supported by the Pulitzer Center, later accompanied by a broadsheet article, live events, and a podcast. "The 1619 Project: A New Origin Story" is a book-length anthology of essays and poetry that further develops the project's ideas.

The project has become a leading subject of the American history wars, receiving criticism from historians, both from the political left and the right, who question its historical accuracy. In a letter published in The New York Times in December 2019, historians Gordon S. Wood, James M. McPherson, Sean Wilentz, Victoria E. Bynum, and James Oakes applauded "all efforts to address the enduring centrality of slavery and racism to our history" and deemed the project a "praiseworthy and urgent public service," but expressed "strong reservations" about some "important aspects" of the project and requested factual corrections. These scholars denied the project's claim that slavery was essential to the beginning of the American Revolution. In response, Jake Silverstein, the editor of The New York Times Magazine, defended The 1619 Project and refused to issue corrections. On May 4, 2020, the Pulitzer Prize board announced that it was awarding the 2020 Pulitzer Prize for Commentary to Hannah-Jones for her introductory essay.

In March 2020, in light of persistent criticism of the project's portrayal of the role of slavery, including from one of its own consulting historians, Leslie M. Harris, The New York Times issued a "clarification", modifying one of the passages on slavery's role that had sparked controversy. In September 2020, controversy again arose when the Times updated the opening text of the project website to remove the phrase "...understanding 1619 as our true founding..." without any accompanying editorial note to point to what was being redone. (Note: Silverstein said that the phrase had actually been removed in December 2019.) Critics – including the Times' own Bret Stephens – claimed the differences showed that the newspaper was backing away from some of the initiative's controversial claims. The Times defended its practices, with Hannah-Jones saying that most of the project's content had remained unchanged.

The project would be adapted into a podcast, book anthology, and children's book. In 2021 a partnership between the New York Times, Oprah Winfrey's Harpo Productions, and Lionsgate Films was made for the production of films, television programming, and other media based on the 1619 project. In January 2023, Hulu premiered a six-part documentary TV series, The 1619 Project, created by Hannah-Jones and The New York Times Magazine. This series won an Emmy for Outstanding Documentary or Nonfiction Series at the 75th Creative Arts Emmy Awards.

== Background ==
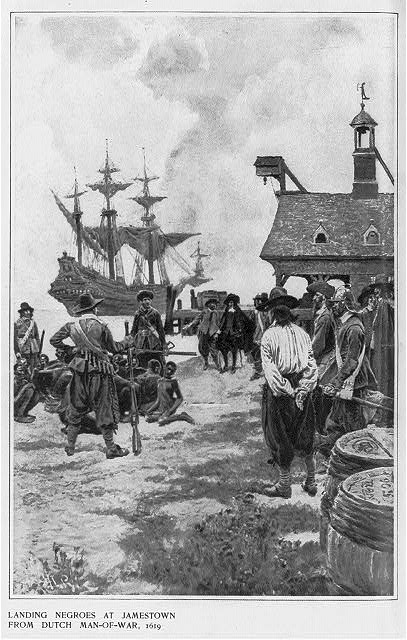
A 1901 illustration of the landing of the first enslaved Africans in Virginia in 1619. The White Lion is seen anchored in the background.

The 1619 Project was launched in August 2019 to commemorate the 400th anniversary of the arrival of the first enslaved Africans in the British colony of Virginia. In 1619, a group of "twenty and odd" captive Africans arrived in the Virginia Colony. White Lion, an English privateer operating under a Dutch letter of marque, carried 20–30 Africans who had been captured in joint African-Portuguese raids against the Kingdom of Ndongo in modern-day Angola, making its landing at Point Comfort in the English colony of Virginia.

Although the project places this moment in the context of slavery in the colonial history of the United States, some critics have taken issue. The first enslaved Africans were brought to North America in 1526, and European enslavement of Native Americans has been documented as far back as Columbus in 1493–1494.

From 2011 to 2015 the New York Times ran a series of articles for the sesquicentennial of the American Civil War titled "Disunion", which released articles recounting what happened 150 years earlier on the same date, which was the group's first foray into historical essays.

In an interview with Colby College, Nikole Hannah-Jones said she first learned of the importance of the date 1619 after reading Lerone Bennett Jr.'s Before the Mayflower: A History of Black America, 1619–1962. Hannah-Jones stated in a discussion with Henry Louis Gates Jr. that while she had been considering a project based around black history for years, it was when she got into an argument on Twitter where she was told "Slavery was a long time ago. Why don't you get over it?" that inspired her to develop the project to combat what she saw as a lack of knowledge on black history.

== Project ==
The 1619 project was developed by Nikole Hannah-Jones (pictured in 2018).

The project dedicated an issue of the magazine to a re-examination of the legacy of slavery in America, at the anniversary of the 1619 arrival of the first enslaved people to the British colony of Virginia. This framing challenges the idea that American history began with the signing of the Declaration of Independence in 1776, which created the United States, or with the arrival of the Pilgrims in 1620.

The project quickly grew into a larger endeavor, encompassing multiple issues of the magazine, with related materials in other Times publications, as well as a school curriculum developed in collaboration with the Pulitzer Center. With support from the Smithsonian, the project recruited a panel of historians to research, develop, and fact-check content. The project was envisioned with the condition that almost all of the content would be from African-American contributors, deeming the perspective of Black writers an essential element of the story to be told.

Nikole Hannah-Jones said in an interview with the Chicago Tribune that "If you read the whole project, I don't think you can come away from it without understanding the project is an argument for reparations".

=== August 18, 2019, magazine issue ===
The first edition appeared in a 100-page issue of The New York Times Magazine on August 18, 2019. It included ten written essays, a photo essay, and a collection of poems and fiction, with an introduction by editor-in-chief Jake Silverstein, as follows:

- "Our Democracy's Founding Ideals Were False When They Were Written. Black Americans Have Fought to Make Them True", essay by Nikole Hannah-Jones
- "American Capitalism Is Brutal. You Can Trace That to the Plantation", essay by Matthew Desmond
- "How False Beliefs in Physical Racial Difference Still Live in Medicine Today", essay by Linda Villarosa
- "What the Reactionary Politics of 2019 Owe to the Politics of Slavery", essay by Jamelle Bouie
- "Why Is Everyone Always Stealing Black Music?", essay by Wesley Morris
- "How Segregation Caused Your Traffic Jam", essay by Kevin M. Kruse
- "Why Doesn't America Have Universal Healthcare? One Word: Race", essay by Jeneen Interlandi
- "Why American Prisons Owe Their Cruelty to Slavery", essay by Bryan Stevenson
- "The Barbaric History of Sugar in America", essay by Khalil Gibran Muhammad
- "How America's Vast Racial Wealth Gap Grew: By Plunder", essay by Trymaine Lee
- "Their Ancestors Were Enslaved by Law. Now They're Lawyers", photo essay by Djeneba Aduayom, with text from Nikole Hannah-Jones and Wadzanai Mhute
- "A New Literary Timeline of African-American History", a collection of original poems and stories
  - Clint Smith on the Middle Passage
  - Yusef Komunyakaa on Crispus Attucks
  - Eve L. Ewing on Phillis Wheatley
  - Reginald Dwayne Betts on the Fugitive Slave Act of 1793
  - Barry Jenkins on Gabriel's Rebellion
  - Jesmyn Ward on the Act Prohibiting Importation of Slaves
  - Tyehimba Jess on Black Seminoles
  - Darryl Pinckney on the Emancipation Proclamation
  - ZZ Packer on the New Orleans massacre of 1866
  - Yaa Gyasi on the Tuskegee syphilis experiment
  - Jacqueline Woodson on Sgt. Isaac Woodard
  - Joshua Bennett on the Black Panther Party
  - Lynn Nottage on the birth of hip-hop
  - Kiese Laymon on the Rev. Jesse Jackson's "rainbow coalition" speech
  - Clint Smith on the Superdome after Hurricane Katrina

One of the claims made by Hannah-Jones was that the colonists fought the Revolutionary War to preserve slavery. The claim was later softened to say that "some of" the colonists fought to preserve slavery. The essays further discussed details of history as well as modern American society, such as traffic jams and the American affinity for sugar, and their connections to slavery and segregation. Matthew Desmond's essay argued that slavery had shaped modern capitalism and workplace norms. Jamelle Bouie's essay drew parallels between pro-slavery politics and the modern right-wing politics. Bouie argued that the United States still had not let go of the assumption that some people inherently deserved more power than others.

=== Accompanying material and activities ===
The magazine issue was accompanied by a special section in the Sunday newspaper, in partnership with the Smithsonian, examining the beginnings of the transatlantic slave trade, written by Mary Elliott and Jazmine Hughes. Beginning on August 20, a multi-episode audio series titled "1619" began, published by The Daily, the morning news podcast of the Times. The Sunday sports section had an essay about slavery's impact on professional sports in the United States: "Is Slavery's Legacy in the Power Dynamics of Sports?". The Times plans to take the project to schools, with the 1619 Project Curriculum developed in collaboration with the Pulitzer Center. Hundreds of thousands of extra copies of the magazine issue were printed for distribution to schools, museums and libraries.

The Pulitzer Center on Crisis Reporting has made available free online lesson plans, is collecting further lesson plans from teachers, and helps arrange for speakers to visit classes. The Center considers most of the lessons usable by all grades from elementary school through college. In 2026 the Pulitzer Center ran an exhibit with the DC Public Library inspired by the 1619 Project called "Freedom and Resistance" that included material submitted by student artists.

In November 2021, Random House's One World imprint published the anthology The 1619 Project: A New Origin Story. It is a book-length expansion of the project's essays. The book was created by Nikole Hannah-Jones and The New York Times Magazine, and is edited by Hannah-Jones, Caitlin Roper, Ilena Silverman and Jake Silverstein. Seven chapters were used for The 1619 Project: A Visual Experience, which combined them with newly commissioned art and archival material.

In 2021 it was announced that a partnership between The New York Times, Lionsgate Films, and Oprah Winfrey's Harpo Productions had been reached to develop the project into feature films, television series, podcasts, books, curriculums, and location-based exhibitions. The first offering of this partnership was the documentary miniseries, "The 1619 Project", in which six of the essays from A New Origin Story were adapted into six-episodes. The series premiered on January 26, 2023, on Hulu. In a 2022 filing with the Securities and Exchange Commission Lionsgate said two feature films and two scripted television series based on the 1619 Project were in development, along with a multicity exhibition.

A children's picture book adaptation The 1619 Project: Born on the Water was released in 2021, the work was written by Hannah-Jones and Renée Watson and was illustrated by Nikkolas Smith. In 2026 a stage play adaptation of Born on the Water debuted at the Martin Luther King Jr. Memorial Library.

== Reception ==
=== Historical accuracy ===
In an essay for The New York Review of Books, historian Sean Wilentz accused the project of cynicism for its portrayal of the American Revolution, the Civil War and Abraham Lincoln, who Wilentz wrote is "rendered as a white supremacist". In a December 2019 letter published in The New York Times, Wilentz, along with fellow historians Gordon S. Wood, James M. McPherson, Victoria Bynum, and James Oakes expressed "strong reservations" about the project and requested factual corrections, accusing the authors of a "displacement of historical understanding by ideology". The letter disputed the claim, made in Hannah-Jones' introductory essay, that "one of the primary reasons the colonists decided to declare their independence from Britain was because they wanted to protect the institution of slavery". The Times published the letter along with a rebuttal from the magazine's editor-in-chief, Jake Silverstein, who defended the accuracy of the 1619 Project and declined to issue corrections. Wood responded in a letter, "I don't know of any colonist who said that they wanted independence in order to preserve their slaves ... No colonist expressed alarm that the mother country was out to abolish slavery in 1776." In an article in The Atlantic, Wilentz responded to Silverstein, writing, "No effort to educate the public in order to advance social justice can afford to dispense with a respect for basic facts", and disputing the accuracy of Silverstein's defense of the project.

Also in December 2019, twelve scholars and political scientists specializing in the American Civil War sent a letter to the Times saying that "The 1619 Project offers a historically-limited view of slavery." While agreeing to the importance of examining American slavery, they objected to what they described as the portrayal of slavery as a uniquely American phenomenon, to construing slavery as a capitalist venture, and to presenting out-of-context quotes of a conversation between Abraham Lincoln and "five esteemed free black men". The following month, Silverstein issued a response stating that no corrections were necessary.

In January 2020, historian Susan Parker, who specializes in the studies of Colonial United States at Flagler College, noted that slavery existed before any of the Thirteen Colonies. She wrote in an editorial in The St. Augustine Record that "The settlement known as San Miguel de Gualdape lasted for about six weeks from late September 1526 to the middle of November. Historian Paul Hoffman writes that the slaves at San Miguel rebelled and set fire to some homes of the Spaniards." Writing in USA Today, several historians—among them Parker, archaeologist Kathleen A. Deagan also of Flagler, and civil rights activist and historian David Nolan—all agreed that slavery was present decades before the year 1619. According to Deagan, people have "spent their careers trying to correct the erroneous belief" in such a narrative, with Nolan claiming that in ignoring the earlier settlement, the authors were "robbing black history".

In March 2020, historian Leslie M. Harris, who had been consulted for the project, wrote in Politico that she had warned the project's team that the idea that the American Revolution was fought to protect slavery was inaccurate, and that the Times made avoidable mistakes, but that the project was "a much-needed corrective to the blindly celebratory histories". Hannah-Jones has also said that she stands by the claim that slavery helped fuel the revolution, though she concedes she might have phrased it too strongly in her essay, in a way that could give readers the impression that the support for slavery was universal. On March 11, 2020, Silverstein authored an "update" in the form of a "clarification" on the Times' website, correcting Hannah-Jones's essay to state that "protecting slavery was a primary motivation for some of the colonists". This "clarification" was reportedly prompted by a private warning to Silverstein by Harvard classicist and political scientist Danielle Allen that she might go public with criticism if the passage on the revolution were not corrected.

In December 2023, historian James Oakes wrote a detailed essay published in Jacobin that criticized the historical accuracy of the project in multiple areas, stating that it "has botched the history of the slave economy, misconstrued the origins of Northern economic development, erased the history of antislavery, and rendered emancipation irrelevant". Oakes had earlier written criticisms for Jacobin's peer-reviewed journal Catalyst, where he stated that the project commonly overstates the effect and economic value of southern slavery in the wider American and international economy and falsely equated sharecropping and slavery. Oakes stated that Matthew Desmond's claims regarding Thomas Affleck's Cotton Plantation Record and Account Book misrepresents his sources, the work Desmond's cites as showing the commonality of the book and the influence it had on accounting actually noted how uncommonly the book was used and how it had no influence on the later development of accounting.

Oakes also wrote that the project highly misrepresented the historiography of American slavery and argued that the project was less revisionist than it claimed. Oakes stated that the project's claim that 1619 was a little known date is inaccurate due to it being a prominent feature of historical studies, lectures, and popular books such as A People's History of the United States going back decades, and that most American school textbooks have worked to avoid patriotic narratives and include minority voices since the 1970s.

==== Response ====
In September 2020, Nikole Hannah-Jones criticized conservatives for their depiction of the project because it "does not argue that 1619 is our true founding". Atlantic writer Conor Friedersdorf responded on Twitter by citing statements from Hannah-Jones that 1619 was the nation's true founding. Critics cited by The Washington Post, such as Quillette magazine, argued that this showed that the Times was quietly revising its position without acknowledgement of the original mischaracterization. The conservative National Association of Scholars published a letter asking for the revocation of the project's Pulitzer Prize.

In an opinion column in the New York Times, Bret Stephens said that Hannah-Jones had said the argument about dating the founding to 1619 was self-evidently metaphorical, but said "these were not minor points. The deleted assertions went to the core of the project's most controversial goal, 'to reframe American history by considering what it would mean to regard 1619 as our nation's birth year'", and argued, "The question of journalistic practices, however, raises deeper doubts about the 1619 Project's core premises." This column led to tension within the Times, and prompted statements by Times executive editor Dean Baquet, publisher A. G. Sulzberger and New York Times Magazine editor Jake Silverstein in support of the 1619 Project. Responding to criticism, Hannah-Jones wrote on Twitter, "Those who've wanted to act as if tweets/discussions about the project hold more weight than the actual words of the project cannot be taken in good faith", and that "Those who point to edits of digital blurbs but ignore the unchanged text of the actual project cannot be taken in good faith."

==== Motivations for the American Revolution ====
Much of the debate about the accuracy of the 1619 project revolved around Lord Dunmore's Proclamation.

Significant controversy has centered on the project's claims that "one of the primary reasons the colonists decided to declare their independence from Britain was because they wanted to protect the institution of slavery". According to Princeton University professor Sean Wilentz, the claim that there was a "perceptible British threat to American slavery in 1776" is an ahistorical assertion, noting that the British abolitionist movement was practically non-existent in 1776. Wilentz also criticized the project's mentioning the Somerset v Stewart case to support its argument, since that legal decision concerned slavery in England, with no effect in the American colonies. Wilentz wrote that the project's claims that "if the Revolution had caused the ending of the slave trade, this would have upended the economy of the colonies, in both the North and the South" did not consider the numerous attempts to outlaw—or impose prohibitive duties on—the slave trade by several colonies from 1769 to 1774. The historians critical of the project have said that many of America's Founding Fathers, such as John Adams, James Otis, and Thomas Paine, opposed slavery. They also said that every state north of Maryland took steps to abolish slavery after the revolution.

In defense of the project, Silverstein said that the Somerset case caused a "sensation" in American reports. But Wilentz countered that the decision was reported by only six newspapers in the southern colonies, and the tone of the coverage was indifferent. Also at issue was the significance of Dunmore's Proclamation as cited by Silverstein, with Wilentz asserting that the event was a response to rebellion rather than a cause; he also questioned the reliance on a quotation by Edward Rutledge as interpreted by Jill Lepore. Harris has also pointed to Dunmore's Proclamation as a spur to the disruption of slavery by the revolutionary side as well.

=== Journalistic reactions ===
The 1619 Project received positive reviews by Alexandria Neason in the Columbia Journalism Review and by Ellen McGirt in Fortune magazine, which declared the project "wide-reaching and collaborative, unflinching, and insightful" and a "dramatic and necessary corrective to the fundamental lie of the American origin story."

Andrew Sullivan critiqued the project as an important perspective that needed to be heard but that was presented in a biased way under the guise of objectivity. Writing in The Washington Post, George Will called the project "malicious" and "historically illiterate." Writing in The Week, Damon Linker found the 1619 Project's treatment of history "sensationalistic, reductionistic, and tendentious." Timothy Sandefur deemed the project's goal as worthy, but observed that the articles persistently went wrong trying to connect everything with slavery. In National Review, Phillip W. Magness wrote that the project provides a distorted economic history borrowed from "bad scholarship" of the New History of Capitalism (NHC), and Rich Lowry wrote that Hannah-Jones' lead essay leaves out unwelcome facts about slavery, such that 'it was Africans who captured other Africans, and marched them to the coast to be sold to European slavers', smears the Revolution, distorts the Constitution, and misrepresents the founding era and Lincoln. Victor Davis Hanson said that the 1619 Project reveals that The New York Times "does not care about the truth" and instead "hires and promotes its reporters and editors on woke – race and gender – criteria rather than proven reporting excellence."

In the May 2022 issue of the libertarian magazine Reason, reporter Phillip W. Magness criticized the 1619 Project as "junk history." Magness contrasted the present work of Hannah-Jones with past work at historical understanding of slavery by prominent African-Americans such as Zora Neale Hurston: "Hurston did not aim to bury an ugly past but to search for historical understanding ... 'While I have a handkerchief over my eyes crying over the landing of the first slaves in 1619,' she continued, 'I might miss something swell that is going on in' the present day."

=== Political reactions ===
The project received varied reactions from political figures. Then-Democratic Senator Kamala Harris praised it in a tweet, stating "The #1619Project is a powerful and necessary reckoning of our history. We cannot understand and address the problems of today without speaking truth about how we got here."

High-profile conservatives criticized it. Former House Speaker Newt Gingrich called it "brainwashing" and "propaganda," later writing an opinion piece characterizing it as "left-wing propaganda masquerading as 'the truth'". Republican Senator Ted Cruz also equated it with propaganda. President Donald Trump, in an interview on Fox News with Chris Wallace, said,

I just look at—I look at school. I watch, I read, look at the stuff. Now they want to change—1492, Columbus discovered America. You know, we grew up, you grew up, we all did, that's what we learned. Now they want to make it the 1619 project. Where did that come from? What does it represent? I don't even know.

In July 2020, Republican Senator Tom Cotton of Arkansas proposed the "Saving American History Act of 2020", prohibiting K-12 schools from using federal funds to teach curriculum related to the 1619 Project, and make schools that did ineligible for federal professional-development grants. Cotton added that "The 1619 Project is a racially divisive and revisionist account of history that threatens the integrity of the Union by denying the true principles on which it was founded." On September 6, 2020, Trump responded on Twitter to a claim that the State of California was adding the 1619 Project to the state's public school curriculum. Trump stated that the Department of Education was investigating the matter and, if the aforementioned claim was found true, federal funding would be withheld from California public schools. On September 17, Trump announced the 1776 Commission to develop a "patriotic" curriculum.

In October 2020, the National Association of Scholars, a conservative advocacy group, published an open letter with 21 signatories calling on the Pulitzer Prize Board to rescind Hannah-Jones' prize because of the project's claim that "protecting the institution of slavery was a primary motive for the American Revolution, a claim for which there is simply no evidence."

In November 2020, Trump established the 1776 Commission by executive order, organizing 18 conservative leaders to generate an opposing response to the 1619 Project. The 1776 Report, released on January 18, 2021, was widely criticized for factual errors, incomplete or missing citations, and lack of academic rigor. The commission was terminated by President Joe Biden on January 20, 2021.

On April 30, 2021, U.S. Senate Minority Leader Mitch McConnell sent a letter to Secretary of Education Miguel Cardona protesting the Department of Education's proposal to modify federal grants to states and local schools to "incentivize them to use tools like the 1619 Project in their classrooms" and demanding that the proposal be abandoned. McConnell's letter charged that the programs were being modified "away from their intended purposes toward a politicized and divisive agenda" and said that "Actual, trained, credentialed historians with diverse political views have debunked the project's many factual and historical errors."

The World Socialist Web Site criticized the New York Times' "falsification of history", saying that it wrongly centers on racial rather than class conflict. The Website would serve as a platform for several historians to criticize the project early on, such as Gordon Wood, James Oakes, and James McPherson.

=== Awards ===
Project creator Nikole Hannah-Jones was awarded the 2020 Pulitzer Prize for Commentary for her essay. The award cited her "sweeping, provocative and personal essay for the ground-breaking 1619 Project, which seeks to place the enslavement of Africans at the center of America's story, prompting public conversation about the nation's founding and evolution."

In October 2020, New York University's Arthur L. Carter Journalism Institute named the 1619 Project one of the ten greatest works of journalism in the 2010–2019 decade.

=== Bans ===
Donald Trump, in the final months of his first term as president of the United States, vowed to ban the 1619 Project from state curricula, accusing educators of teaching their students to "hate their own country." Echoing Trump's proposal, Republican lawmakers also sought to ban the project from state curricula; bills were introduced by US Senator Tom Cotton at the federal level, by State Representative Mark Lowery in Arkansas, by State Representative Skyler Wheeler in Iowa, and by Senator Angela Burks Hill in Mississippi. By the end of the summer of 2021, 27 states had introduced bills echoing the language and intent of Cotton's bill.

Under Ron DeSantis, the 1619 Project was banned from being taught in Florida public schools, first by a 2021 Florida State Board of Education amendment banning critical race theory and again in 2022 by the Stop WOKE Act.

== See also ==
- 1776 Commission
- 1776 Unites
- 1836 Project
- Four Hundred Souls: A Community History of African America, 1619–2019 (2021)
- 500 Years Later (2005)
- Jamestown 2007
- Voyages: The Trans-Atlantic Slave Trade Database
