= 1836 Project =

Texas law article

- Language: English
- Genre: Government report
- Publisher: 1836 Project Advisory Committee, Texas Education Agency
- Publication date: 2022
- Publication place: United States

House Bill 2497

Texas Legislature
- Long title: An Act relating to the establishment and duties of the Texas 1836 Project.
- Passed by: House of Representatives
- Passed: 5 May 2021
- Passed by: Senate
- Passed: 26 May 2021
- Signed by: Governor Greg Abbott
- Signed: 16 June 2021
- Commenced: September 1, 2021

Legislative history

Initiating chamber: House of Representatives
- Bill citation: Full Text of HB 2497 with signatures of: Senate President Dan Patrick; House Speaker Dade Phelan; House Chief Clerk Robert Haney; Secretary of the Senate Patsy Spaw; Governor Greg Abbott
- Passed: 30 March 2021
- Voting summary: 124 voted for; 19 voted against; 6 absent; 1 present not voting

Revising chamber: Senate
- Passed: 6 May 2021
- Voting summary: 22 voted for; 9 voted against
- Status: In force

The 1836 Project, created by Texas House Bill 2497 of the Texas Legislature, is an advisory committee designed to promote "patriotic education" regarding Texas history.

Texas's 1836 project is an “advisory committee designed to promote patriotic education and increase awareness of the Texas values that continue to stimulate boundless prosperity across this state” originally established by house bill 2497. "The 1836 Project: Telling the Texas Story" also explains that there were nine committee members made up the 1836 Project, in an attempt to represent the diversity of the state. Three members were appointed by each of the following: the speaker of the house of representatives, lieutenant governor, and governor. Individuals in the private sector with appropriate experience or subject matter expertise may be among the appointees. The bill was introduced on March 1st, 2021, passed by the house and senate in May 2021 and then executive signed in June of 2021.

The committee's report, "The 1836 Project: Telling the Texas Story", was released in 2022. It will be available to new drivers at Texas driver's license offices across the state.

== Development ==
House Bill 2497 was passed in May 2021, receiving support from Republicans and Democrats, and was signed into law by Texas Governor Greg Abbott. The 1836 project’s main goal shall be to “promote awareness among residents of this state of the following as they relate to the history of prosperity and democratic freedom in this state.” The committee states this is to be done by promoting awareness of the following: the indigenous peoples, the spanish and mexican heritage, Tejanos, the African-American heritage, Texas war for independence, juneteenth, annexation of Texas, the christian heritage, heritage of keeping and bearing firearms, the founding documents of the state, the founders, state civics, and the role of this state in passing the federal Voting Rights Act of 1965. House lawmakers passed the bill by a margin of 124 to 19.

The law went into effect on September 1, 2021, and will expire in 2036. The project is named after the year Texas won independence from Mexico during the Texas Revolution and is funded by the Texas Education Agency. The bill is meant to promote a "patriotic education" to the state’s residents. The 1836 Project is made up of a nine-member advisory committee tasked with promoting the state’s history to Texas residents, primarily through pamphlets given to people receiving driver’s licenses. Committee members were appointed by Abbott, Lieutenant Governor Dan Patrick and House Speaker Dade Phelan. The project also awards students for their knowledge of the state’s history and values through the Gubernatorial 1836 Award.

It is believed by many that Texas’s 1836 project was inspired by a few similar projects that happened in the years leading up to it. Harvey Graff’s article “Battle of the Books'' speculates that the 1836 project was enacted in order to combat the New York Times “1619 project” which is a deliberate plan to rewrite American history by systematically including people of color, whose first non-native ancestors arrived in Virginia in 1619 as slaves. The article also mentions Trump’s 1776 Project that begins the history of the United States with the Revolution, additionally, most forms of conflict, including racial and gender, are erased from history in favor of a push for freedoms that predominantly benefit a white man.

== Criticism ==
The project's name was criticized by some because Texas’ independence didn’t apply to all people living in Texas at the time, including slaves and indigenous groups. Critics, including Nikole Hannah-Jones, who created The 1619 Project, worried that the 1836 Project was created as a way to limit the teaching of critical race theory in schools and hide the country's history of racism. The project has also received criticism for promoting the "Christian heritage" of the state. Historians consulted by The Texas Tribune stated: "that condensing the state’s history and painting it in a mostly celebratory light came at a cost. The pamphlet, they said, fails to fully hold institutions accountable for slavery and other forms of oppression and shortchanged Indigenous Texans, Tejanos, Black Texans and women."
