= Ron Nixon =

American journalist

- Occupation: Journalist

Ron Nixon is an American journalist. He was the homeland security correspondent for The New York Times, and the author of Selling Apartheid: South Africa’s Global Propaganda War. He joined the Associated Press as international investigations editor in early 2019, and was promoted to global investigations editor in March of that year.

In early 2015, Ron Nixon, along with Nikole Hannah-Jones, Corey Johnson, and Topher Sanders, began dreaming of creating the Ida B. Wells Society for Investigative Reporting. This organization was launched in Memphis, Tennessee, in 2016, with the purpose of promoting investigative journalism, which is the least common type of reporting. Following in the footsteps of Ida B. Wells, this society encourages minority journalists to expose injustices perpetuated by the government and defend people who are susceptible to being taken advantage of. This organization was created with much support from the Open Society Foundations, Ford Foundation, and CUNY Graduate School of Journalism. In 2021, Ron Nixon was named the inaugural News Leader of the Year by News Leaders Association.
