= Jerry C. Davis =

Jerry Collins Davis (born 1943) is an American education executive currently serving as chancellor of the College of the Ozarks in Branson, Missouri. Davis became highly controversial during his long-time service as President of the College of the Ozarks, with some critics praising his dedication to an alternative model of education, but others severely criticising his dogmatic patriotism. Davis was a member of Donald Trump's 1776 Commission, while College of the Ozarks' patriotism has become an important influence on his 2025 Executive Order 14190.

== Early life and education ==
Davis was born in Richland, Georgia and grew up in Hartwell. He was initially educated at The Mount Berry School for Boys in Mount Berry, before attending the unaccredited church-run Truett McConnell University between 1961 and 1963. Davis then obtained a biology degree from Mars Hill University in 1965, earned a master's degree in parasitology at the University of Tennessee in 1967, and obtained his final Ph. D. from Ohio State University for a dissertation on American species of the genus Blapstinus in 1970. Davis would continue doing work on Blapstinus into the 1980s.

== Early career and presidency of Alice Lloyd College ==
After finishing his thesis at Ohio State, Davis immediately accepted a teaching position with Cumberland College in Williamsburg, Kentucky. By 1973 he had become an associate professor of biology at the college and compiled a lab book, and by 1975 Davis was the college's Vice-President for Development. During the following two years he would move to Tigerville, South Carolina and serve as Vice-President of North Greenville College

In 1977, Davis was appointed president of Alice Lloyd College in Kentucky's Knott County. At the time the college was struggling with the social upheavals of the 1960s and 1970s and severe weakening of the discipline expected by its founder, with the result that outgoing President William Hayes retired a year earlier than originally planned. Davis impressed Alice Lloyd's management with his energy and commitment to traditional values, in addition to his youth. He had believed that college graduates had to become leaders of society without pursuing money. At Alice Lloyd he immediately suspended a quarter of the student body and a number of staff members, citing a "sex and marijuana culture". Davis would also refocus upon recruitment from the Appalachian area and reestablish codes of conduct, besides eliminating the small tuition fee Hayes had introduced, and most critically converting Alice Lloyd to a four-year institution rather than a junior college. The reforms would prove highly successful, as enrollment more than tripled during Davis' first half-decade as president, and many new developments occurred on campus.

== The Ozarks ==
Upon his appointment to School of the Ozarks, Davis carried out similar reforms to those that he had carried out at Alice Lloyd. He first gave students summer work options, reduced news and music programming on the schools' radio station, and reduced the athletic budget by two-ninths. Davis would then abolish faculty governance and tenure in favor of one-year and multi-year contracts, and forbade staff from publicizing their connection to the school without his explicit permission.

Davis' autocratic leadership at the renamed College of the Ozarks was controversial and there were calls for him to be fired during the 1990s, as resentment developed over his perceived intolerance for free expression. At the same time Davis began a long period of increasing endowments for the school, whilst distancing the institution further from government influence.

In 1993, Davis entered the spotlight when he refused a gift of $15,000 by Wayne Newton after he had performed in Branson, saying that he was horrified at Newton's sexual jokes and entendres.

== Honors ==
- "Icon of Education", Ingram's Magazine (February 2014)
- "Man of the Year", Springfield Business Journal (2016)

== Personal life ==
Davis married Shirley, a registered nurse, during his education and had three children with Shirley. He has remained married after over half a century.

== Bibliography ==
- Davis, Jerry C. (1982). Miracle on Caney Creek. Pippa Passes, Kentucky: Caney Creek Community Center.
- Davis, Jerry C. (2007). Miracle in the Ozarks: The Inspiring Story of Faith, Hope, and Hard Work U. Point Lookout, Missouri: College of the Ozarks.
- Davis, Jerry C. (2013). The Four Generals of Hard Work U.: Extraordinary Lives of Ordinary Americans. Point Lookout, Missouri: College of the Ozarks.
- Davis, Jerry C. (2021). Vietnam 101: A Class Like No Other. Point Lookout, Missouri: Hyer Press (College of the Ozarks). ISBN 978-1736759011.
