= AYJ =

AYJ or Ayj may refer to:

- A. Y. Jackson Secondary School (Ottawa), a high school in Ottawa, Ontario, Canada
- Alliance for Youth Justice, an initiative of the Campaign for Youth Justice; see Campaign for Youth Justice#Alliance for Youth Justice
- Ayj, a musician who was part of The Mack Pack, a band that formed after the breakup of LFO (American band)
- AYJ, an engine formerly manufactured by the Volkswagen Group; see List of discontinued Volkswagen Group petrol engines
- Ayodhya Airport (IATA code AYJ)

== See also ==
- AYJ Snoozing With Paper in Hand in Hotel Room, Calabogie ON 1960, a painting by Ralph Wallace Burton
- ANA & JP Express, a former Japan-based cargo airline with callsign "AYJAY CARGO"
- A. Y. Jackson Secondary School (Toronto), a high school in Toronto, Ontario, Canada
- Age (disambiguation)
