= History wars =

History wars may refer to:

- Australian history wars
- Canadian history wars
- American history wars
