= Shirien Damra =

American illustrator, designer

- Born: c. 1987 (age 38–39); Chicago, Illinois, U.S.
- Education: DePaul University
- Occupations: illustrator, designer, social movement activist
- Website: www.shiriendamra.com

Shirien Damra (born c. 1987) is an American illustrator, designer, artist, and activist. She is known for her illustrations in support of social justice movements including the Black Lives Matter (BLM) movement, and support of the LGBT community, immigration, Indigenous rights, and Palestine. Her work has had power through viral sharing (via social media), and has been noted as a newer form of activism.

== Early life and education ==
Shirien Damra was born in 1987 in Chicago, to Muslim parents that are Palestinian refugees. She knew about injustice and racism from her childhood.

Damra attended DePaul University, where she received a bachelor's degree and master's degree in sociology. In 2015, she was diagnosed with cancer and she had to take a break from her advocacy work. In 2019, she started posting images on instagram.

== Career ==
Damra's George Floyd portrait (2020) was a tribute and was created using soft colors and featured his bust with eyes closed, and ringed in a wreath of flowers. Her portrait of Floyd went viral after she had posted it on instagram, and resulted in more than 3.4 million "likes". The Floyd portrait image was projected on the front of Grace Cathedral (2020) in San Francisco; and painted as a mural in Raleigh, North Carolina. Other tribute portraits by Damra made in solidarity with BLM have included Breonna Taylor, and Ahmaud Arbery. All of the Damra portraits have their eyes closed, this is a reference to inward reflection and a style found in Eastern art. Damra was commissioned by the Georgia's NAACP chapter for her Ahmaud Arbery portrait. Additionally there is a community of other artists that created BLM-related social media-based viral work in 2020, including Nikkolas Smith, Stormy Nesbit, Dani Coke, Robin Hilkey, and Miriam Mosqueda.

In 2021, design consultancy Matter Unlimited and Damra designed a Washington, D.C. 4th Ward community mural in celebration of "Immigrant Day of Resilience".

Her work is included in the traveling art exhibition, "Ye Shall Inherit the Earth and Faces of the Divine”.

== Criticism ==
Damra's work has been criticized and dismissed for being performative and overly focused on aesthetics. Some claim social media platforms such as instagram has changed how people address activism, and has created a lack of consistency in protest.
