= Nikkolas Smith =

American artist and activist (born 1985)

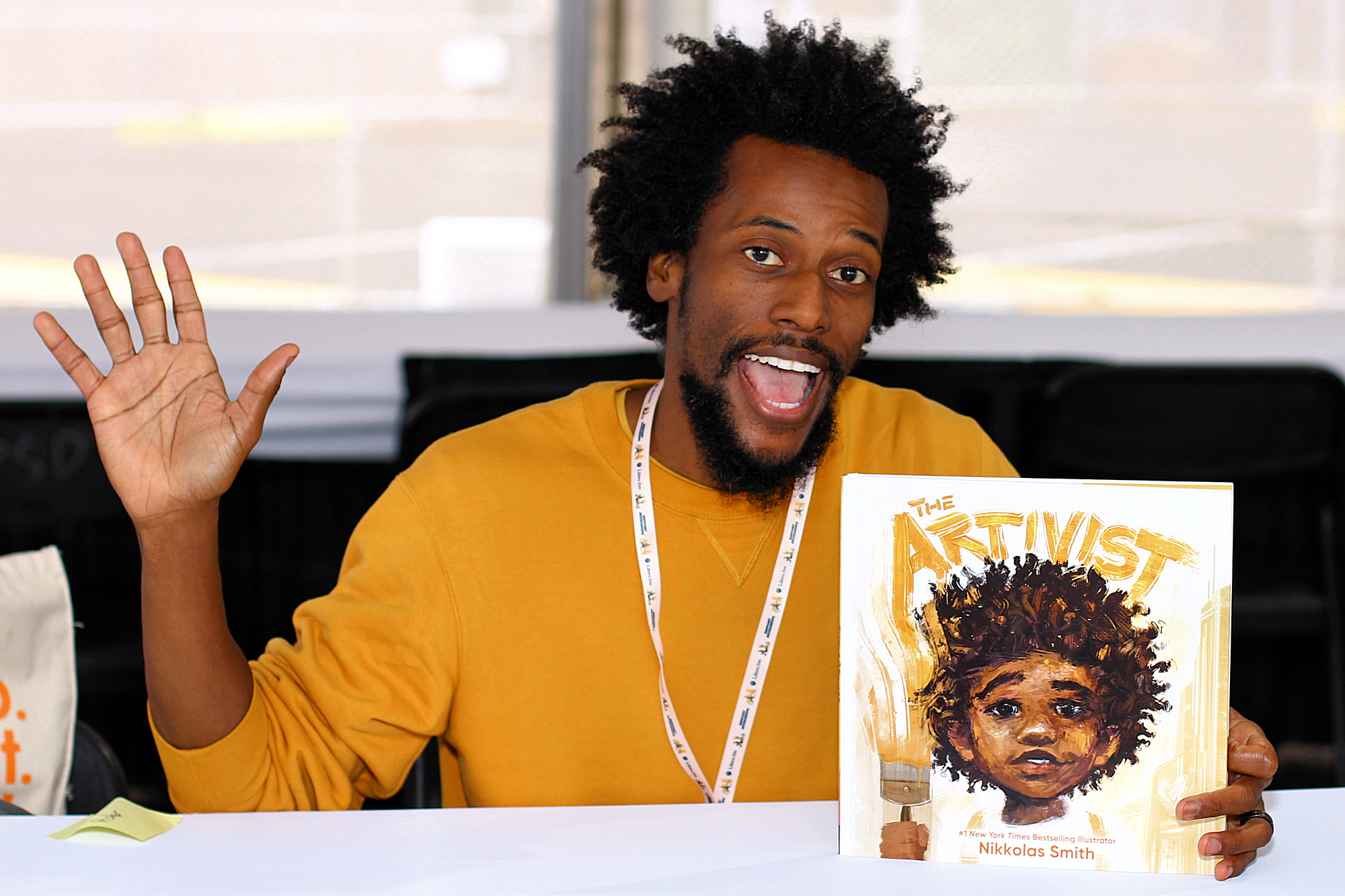
- Smith at the 2023 Texas Book Festival
- Born: 1985 (age 40–41); United States
- Education: Master's of Architecture
- Alma mater: Hampton University
- Occupations: Artist, illustrator, activist
- Movement: Protest art
- Children: 1
- Website: nikkolas.com

Nikkolas Smith (born 1985) is an American contemporary artist, illustrator, and activist. He predominantly depicts African-American voices and has a focus on social justice in his works. His digital paintings are widely shared on social media and have been featured in Times Square, The Washington Post and The New York Times.

== Early life and education ==
Nikkolas Smith was raised in Spring, Texas as the youngest of six children. He earned a master's degree in architecture from Hampton University in Virginia, where he drew political cartoons for the school's newspaper. After graduating, Smith moved to Los Angeles, where he worked as a Disney Imagineer until 2019.

== Art career ==
Smith describes himself as an "artivist", combining activism within his artistic works. Smith's portfolio of artwork ranges in stylization from pop to impressionist, digitally painted on his iPad in Photoshop. His work is influenced by Nina Simone and Norman Rockwell. Smith began his Sunday Sketch series in 2013. He shares weekly Sunday sketches on his Twitter and Instagram channels; select images from this series were compiled into a book.

Smith is an author and illustrator of children's picture books. He illustrated the picture book The 1619 Project: Born on the Water (2021), which was inspired by Nikole Hannah-Jones' The 1619 Project. Fast Company described Smith's illustrations as using African symbols, various color palettes, and carefully drawn facial expressions to show the humanity of the enslaved people. Born on the Water ranked number one on The New York Times Best Seller List Children's Picture Book category and was included on Time for Kids, Best Children's and YA book list published in 2021. Smith's paintings from the 2016 Summer Olympics in Brazil went viral on social media. Skyhorse Publishing offered him a book deal, which resulted in the 2016 book The Golden Girls of Rio. The Golden Girls of Rio was nominated for the 2017 NAACP Image Award for Outstanding Literary Work – Children.

His art often depicts victims of police brutality, civil rights figures, athletes, and cultural icons. Smith began incorporating activism into his art following the killing of Trayvon Martin. In July 2013, his portrait of Martin Luther King Jr. wearing a hoodie went viral. Black Lives Matter commissioned Smith to paint George Floyd in 2020. The finished work was featured as a centerpiece in Times Square's billboards, and the Beverly Center shopping mall in Los Angeles. He has also painted portraits of Tamir Rice, Tony McDade, Breonna Taylor, Ahmaud Arbery, Philando Castile, Bree Newsome, and Lupita Nyong'o. In 2020, there was a community of artists that created BLM-related social media-based viral work, including Smith, Shirien Damra, Stormy Nesbit, Dani Coke, Robin Hilkey, and Miriam Mosqueda.

Smith created an 11 by 10-foot digital painting of Chadwick Boseman after Boseman died from colon cancer in August 2020. The painting, titled King Chad, features Boseman, who played T'Challah in the movie Black Panther, giving the "Wakanda Forever" salute to a child wearing a Black Panther mask. The painting was temporarily on display in Downtown Disney in California. Smith donated his King Chad painting to the Children's Hospital Los Angeles, where it is on permanent display.

Other examples of Smith's work include posters for movies such as Dear White People, If Beale Street Could Talk, Southside with You, and Black Panther. Art Basel invited Smith to create the logo for its "What Matters" campaign in 2019. Notable figures have shared Smith's work on social media, including Michelle Obama, Rihanna, Nipsey Hussle, and Janet Jackson. His digital painting of Atatiana Jefferson was shared on the floor of the U.S. House of Representatives.

In 2021, Smith created the "First Practicing Vegan" for PETA featuring Cory Booker and other prominent vegans in a reproduction of Rockwell's painting, Freedom from Want. The poster appeared at various bus stops in New Jersey during the 2021 holiday season.

== Personal life ==
Smith is married to a documentary filmmaker. The couple have a son.
