= The 1619 Project (TV series) =

American TV documentary series (2023)

- Promotional artwork
- Genre: Docuseries
- Presented by: Nikole Hannah-Jones
- Country of origin: United States
- Original language: English
- No. of episodes: 6

Production
- Executive producers: Oprah Winfrey; Nikole Hannah-Jones; Shoshana Guy; Roger Ross Williams; Kathleen Lingo; Caitlin Roper
- Production companies: Harpo Films; The New York Times; One Story Up Productions; Lionsgate Television; Onyx Collective

Original release
- Network: Hulu
- Release: January 26 – February 9, 2023

The 1619 Project is an American documentary television miniseries created for Hulu. It is adapted from The 1619 Project, a New York Times Magazine journalism project focusing on slavery in the United States, which was later turned into the anthology The 1619 Project: A New Origin Story. Hosted by project creator Nikole Hannah-Jones, the executive producer of the docuseries is Oprah Winfrey. The series is a six-episode program produced by Lionsgate Television and was released on Hulu on January 26, 2023. It received generally positive reviews from critics.

== Development ==
=== Background ===
The 1619 Project premiered in The New York Times in 2019. It focused on the arrival of the first slave ship in the early American colonies as the starting point for a different national origin story of the United States. In exploring this thesis, the project aims to demonstrate that slavery has shaped every aspect of American life since then, from policing to justice to capitalism, and that recognition of this fact is essential for social progress.

The project debuted as a collection of essays in The New York Times Magazine in August 2019 – the 400th anniversary of the introduction of Black slavery to America. While project creator Nikole Hannah-Jones was awarded the Pulitzer Prize for Commentary for her introductory essay, the original project also met with criticism from across the political spectrum, with many historians disputing its original claim that protecting slavery was a major motivation behind the American Revolutionary War. The New York Times eventually qualified that specific claim to say that it was a motivating factor for "some" colonists, while maintaining that the legacy of slavery is pervasive in shaping modern American life.

According to Jake Silverstein, editor-in-chief of The New York Times Magazine, work on turning the content into a television documentary began more than three years before its release. Following the success of the original project, which was published in the magazine, in a special broadsheet section, and as a podcast, the project aimed to reimagine the series in a new format and reach millions of viewers.

=== Format ===
In the docuseries, Hannah-Jones appears both on-camera and in voice-over. The episodes shift between interviews, analyses of American history and culture, and Hannah-Jones's own personal story as a biracial woman growing up in the United States. Each of the six episodes focuses on a different facet of Black life in America, including "Democracy", "Race", "Music", "Capitalism", "Fear," and "Justice".

== Release ==
The 1619 Project premiered on Hulu on January 26, 2023. It was released internationally in the Star hub on Disney+ and on Star+ in Latin America. It made its linear premiere on ABC in the United States on May 31, 2023.

== Reception ==
The documentary series was subject to review bombing. As of 2024 On IMDb the series had a 4.9 weighted review average and a 4.1 unweighted average, this was out of 1,800 user reviews.

=== Critical response ===
The review aggregator website Rotten Tomatoes reported a 93% approval rating with an average rating of 8.6/10, based on 15 critic reviews. The website's critics consensus reads, "Presented with a personal touch by host Nikole Hannah-Jones, The 1619 Project is a comprehensive and often eye-opening treatise on American history." Metacritic, which uses a weighted average, assigned a score of 67 out of 100 based on 7 critics, indicating "generally favorable reviews".

Daniel D'Addario of Variety praised the performance of Nikole Hannah-Jones, and called the television series a "genuinely impressive assemblage of American stories." C. T. Jones of Rolling Stone stated, "It succeeds both technically and as a piece of art, skillfully weaving shots of Black Americans with firsthand accounts, explanations, interviews and stories that have been consistently omitted from the historical record." Judy Berman of Time characterized Nikole Hannah-Jones as an "ideal host" with "an appetite for making bold arguments," and said, "The 1619 Project makes astute connections between the antebellum and pre-civil-rights past, and a present in which Black Americans still disproportionately face police violence, workplace exploitation, and other forms of inequality," while acknowledging the right-wing backlash against The 1619 Project, arguing that the television series is "posed to spark fresh controversy."

Brian Lowry of CNN asserted, "The 1619 Project basically provides an extended taste of what made the Times' effort both celebrated and controversial, earning Hannah-Jones the Pulitzer Prize in the process. As constructed, it certainly doesn't lack for ambition, which as a TV production turns out to be a source of weakness as well as its strength, even among those willing to hear it." Daniel Fienberg of The Hollywood Reporter said that The 1619 Project is "most effective when it feels most personal," noting the imprint of Hannah-Jones's own personal story at its core, while observing that the 55-minute episode format feels rushed "with little autobiographical notes scattered in," and added, "Hulu's adaptation remains cogent and persuasive, but in failing to sufficiently adapt its storytelling to the visual demands and possibilities of TV, it fails to make itself essential", and that "each episode feels like the summarizing of an essay". Keeanga-Yamahtta Taylor of The New Yorker called The 1619 Project a "fascinating and incomplete project," saying, "Nikole Hannah-Jones's documentary series offers a damning portrait of American racism, but its emphasis on the past at times obscures the complexity of the present."

In The New York Review of Books, Adam Hochschild applauded the fourth episode, "Capitalism", for juxtaposing an 1850 Mississippi plantation ledger—which listed the exact number of pounds of cotton each slave picked per day—with a present-day Amazon warehouse on Staten Island where a Black worker describes the computer-driven pressure from management to increase the number of items he handles per hour: "I've picked, on an average, 350 to 400 items an hour. They push you to pick 400." Hochschild adds that the 1619 Project does not explicitly claim Amazon workers are slaves, but "this masterful part of the series is a powerful and unsettling reminder of just how deeply the slave economy reduced human beings not merely to labor but to precisely measurable quantities of labor—and of how a vast corporation...does exactly the same thing."

=== Accolades ===
The series was nominated for Best TV Documentary Or Documentary Series at the 2023 Dorian TV Awards. It was nominated for Outstanding Documentary at the 2023 Black Reel Awards for Television Awards.
