= George Floyd =

African American man murdered by law enforcement (1973–2020)

- Floyd in 2016
- Born: George Perry Floyd Jr. October 14, 1973; Fayetteville, North Carolina, U.S.
- Died: May 25, 2020 (aged 46); Minneapolis, Minnesota, U.S.
- Cause of death: Cardiopulmonary arrest due to neck compression (details)
- Resting place: Houston Memorial Gardens, Pearland, Texas, U.S. 29.5650°N 95.3509°W
- Occupations: Bouncer; truck driver; security guard
- Known for: Circumstances of his death
- Partner: Courteney Ross (2017–2020)
- Children: 5

George Perry Floyd Jr. (October 14, 1973 – May 25, 2020) was an African American man who was murdered by a white police officer in Minneapolis, Minnesota, during an arrest made after a store clerk suspected Floyd had used a counterfeit twenty-dollar bill. One of four police officers who arrived on the scene, Derek Chauvin, knelt on Floyd's neck and back for almost ten minutes, fatally asphyxiating him. After his murder, a series of protests against police brutality, especially towards African Americans, quickly spread nationally and then globally. His dying words became a rallying slogan: "I can't breathe".

Floyd was born in Fayetteville, North Carolina, and grew up in Houston, Texas, playing football and basketball throughout high school and college. Between 1997 and 2005, he was convicted of eight crimes. He served four years in prison after accepting a plea bargain for a 2007 aggravated robbery in a home invasion. After he was paroled in 2013, he served as a mentor in his Christian community and posted anti-violence videos to social media. In 2014, he moved to the Minneapolis area, residing in the nearby suburb of St. Louis Park, and worked as a truck driver and bouncer. In 2020, he lost both jobs during the COVID-19 pandemic.

After his murder, the City of Minneapolis settled a wrongful death lawsuit with Floyd's family for $27 million. Chauvin was convicted on two counts of murder and one count of manslaughter on April 20, 2021, and on June 25, 2021, was sentenced to 22 1/2 years in prison. The other three officers at the scene were also later convicted of violating Floyd's civil rights.

== Early life and education ==
Floyd was born on October 14, 1973, in Fayetteville, North Carolina, to Larcenia "Cissy" Jones Floyd (1947–2018) and George Perry (1949–2002). He had four siblings.

After Floyd's parents separated when he was two, his mother moved with the children to Houston, Texas. The family settled in the Cuney Homes public-housing complex, known as the Bricks, in Houston's Third Ward, a historically African-American neighborhood. Floyd was called Perry as a child and also Big Floyd; being over six feet (183 cm) tall in middle school, he saw sports as a vehicle for improving his life.

Floyd attended Ryan Middle School and graduated from Yates High School in 1993. While at Yates, he was co-captain of the basketball team, playing as a power forward. He was also on the football team as a tight end, and in 1992, his team went to the Texas state championships.

Starting college before any of his siblings, Floyd attended South Florida Community College for two years on a football scholarship and also played on the basketball team. He transferred to Texas A&M University–Kingsville in 1995, where he also played basketball before dropping out. Floyd became a friend of future National Basketball Association (NBA) player Stephen Jackson, who was referred to as his twin because of their strong resemblance to each other, after being introduced in the mid-1990s. At his tallest, he was 6 feet 6 inches (198 cm) tall. By the time of his autopsy, he was 6 feet 4 inches (193 cm) tall and weighed 223 pounds (101 kg).

== Adult life ==
=== Post-college ===
Floyd returned to Houston from college in Kingsville, Texas, in 1995, where he became an automotive customizer and played club basketball. Beginning in 1994, he performed as a rapper using the stage name Big Floyd in the hip-hop group Screwed Up Click. Following his murder, The New York Times described his deep-voiced rhymes as "purposeful," delivered in a slow-motion clip about "'choppin' blades' – driving cars with oversize rims – and his Third Ward pride." The second rap group he was involved in was Presidential Playas, and he worked on their album Block Party, released in 2000.

==== Criminal convictions ====
Between 1997 and 2005, Floyd served eight jail terms on various charges, including drug dealing, drug possession, theft, and trespass. In one of these cases, Floyd was convicted of possessing half a gram of crack cocaine in 2004 based on the testimony of police officer Gerald Goines. Later in 2019, Goines' involvement in the Harding Street raid led to Goines being investigated for a pattern of falsifying evidence. As a result, in April 2021, the district attorney of Harris County, Texas, requested a posthumous pardon for this particular conviction of Floyd's because of Goines' lack of credibility. In October 2021, the Texas Board of Pardons and Paroles recommended that Floyd be posthumously pardoned for this conviction but withdrew the recommendation (and also withdrew 24 other clemency recommendations) in December 2021, citing "procedural errors and lack of compliance with board rules", while announcing that it would reconsider these recommendations.

In 2007, Floyd faced charges for aggravated robbery with a deadly weapon; according to investigators, he entered an apartment by impersonating a water department worker and barged in with five other men, held a pistol to a woman's stomach, and searched for items to steal. Floyd fled the scene but was arrested three months later during a traffic stop, and victims of the robbery identified him from a photo array. In 2009, Floyd was sentenced to five years in prison as part of a plea deal and was paroled in January 2013.

==== Post-prison life ====
After his release, Floyd became more involved with Resurrection Houston, a Christian church and ministry, where he mentored young men and posted anti-violence videos to social media. He delivered meals to senior citizens and volunteered with other projects, such as the Angel By Nature Foundation, a charity founded by rapper Trae tha Truth. Later, Floyd became involved with a ministry that brought men from the Third Ward to Minnesota in a church-work program with drug rehabilitation and job placement services. A friend of his acknowledged that Floyd "had made some mistakes that cost him some years of his life" and noted that he was turning his life around through religion.

In 2014, Floyd moved to Minneapolis to rebuild his life and find work. Soon after his arrival, he completed a 90-day rehabilitation program at the Turning Point program in North Minneapolis. He expressed the need for a job and took up security work at Harbor Light Center, a Salvation Army homeless shelter. He lost that job and took several other jobs. Floyd hoped to earn a commercial driver's license to operate trucks. He passed the required drug test, and program administrators felt that his criminal past did not pose a problem. But he dropped out because his job at a nightclub made it difficult to attend morning classes, and he felt pressure to earn money. Floyd later moved to St. Louis Park and lived with former colleagues. He continued to battle drug addiction and went through periods of use and sobriety.

Friends described Floyd as an influential community member who was respected for his ability to relate to others in his environment based on a shared experience of hardships and setbacks, having served time in prison and living in a poverty-stricken project in Houston. In a video addressing youth in his neighborhood, Floyd reminded his audience that he had his own "shortcomings" and "flaws" and that he was not better than anyone else. He also expressed his disdain for violence taking place in the community, advising his neighbors to put down their weapons and remember that they were loved by him and God.

In May 2019, Floyd was detained by Minneapolis police when an unlicensed car in which he was a passenger was pulled over in a traffic stop. Floyd was found with a bottle of pain pills. Officers handcuffed him and took him to the city's third police precinct station. Floyd told police he did not sell the pills and that they were related to his own addiction. When he appeared agitated, officers encouraged him to relax and helped calm him down, and they later called an ambulance as they grew worried about his condition. No charges were filed in connection with the incident.

In 2019, Floyd worked in security at the El Nuevo Rodeo club, where police officer Derek Chauvin also worked off-duty as a security guard. In 2020, Floyd was working part-time as a security guard at the Conga Latin Bistro Club and began another job as a delivery driver. He lost the delivery driver job in January after being cited for driving without a valid commercial license and for being involved in a minor crash. He was looking for another job when the COVID-19 pandemic hit Minnesota, and his personal financial situation worsened when the club closed in March because of pandemic rules. Also in March, Floyd was hospitalized after overdosing on drugs.

== Murder ==
On May 25, 2020, police were called by a Cup Foods grocery store employee, who suspected that Floyd had used a counterfeit $20 bill. Floyd was sitting in a car with two other passengers. Police officers forcibly removed him from the car and detained him. Police allege that Floyd struggled with the officers, with Floyd saying repeatedly on bodycam footage that he could not breathe even before being pinned to the ground.

Floyd was murdered by Derek Chauvin, a white Minneapolis police officer, who pressed his knee to Floyd's neck for 9 minutes and 29 seconds while Floyd was handcuffed face down in the street. As seen in a witness's cellphone video, two other officers further restrained Floyd, and a fourth prevented onlookers from intervening as Floyd repeatedly stated that he could not breathe. During the final two minutes, Floyd was motionless and had no pulse, but Chauvin kept his knee on Floyd's neck and back even as emergency medical technicians arrived to treat Floyd.

The medical examiner found that Floyd's heart stopped while he was being restrained and that his death was a homicide caused by "cardiopulmonary arrest complicating law enforcement subdual, restraint, and neck compression". The official examination also said that underlying health conditions played a role in Mr. Floyd's death and fentanyl intoxication and recent methamphetamine use may have increased the likelihood of death. A second autopsy, commissioned by Floyd's family, also found his death to be a homicide, specifically citing asphyxia due to neck and back compression; it ruled out the possibility that underlying medical problems contributed to Floyd's death and said that Floyd being able to speak while under Chauvin's knee did not mean he could breathe.

On March 12, 2021, the Minneapolis City Council approved a settlement of $27 million to the Floyd family after a wrongful death lawsuit.

Chauvin was fired and charged with second-degree murder, third-degree murder, and second-degree manslaughter. He was found guilty on all three murder and manslaughter charges on April 20, 2021. On May 12, Hennepin County district judge Peter Cahill allowed the prosecution to seek a greater prison sentence for Chauvin after finding that he treated Floyd "with particular cruelty". On June 25, Judge Cahill sentenced Chauvin to twenty-two and a half years in prison.

== Legacy ==
=== Protests ===
After Floyd's murder, there were global protests and riots against the use of excessive force by police officers against black suspects and a lack of police accountability. Protests began in Minneapolis the day after Floyd's murder and developed in cities throughout all 50 U.S. states and internationally. The New York Times described the events in the wake of Floyd's murder and the video that circulated of it as "the largest protests in the United States since the Civil Rights era." Calls to defund and abolish the police were widespread. The protests became the first civil disorder event to exceed $1 billion in losses to the insurance industry. In some cities, protests were so violent that curfews were put in place.

=== Memorials ===
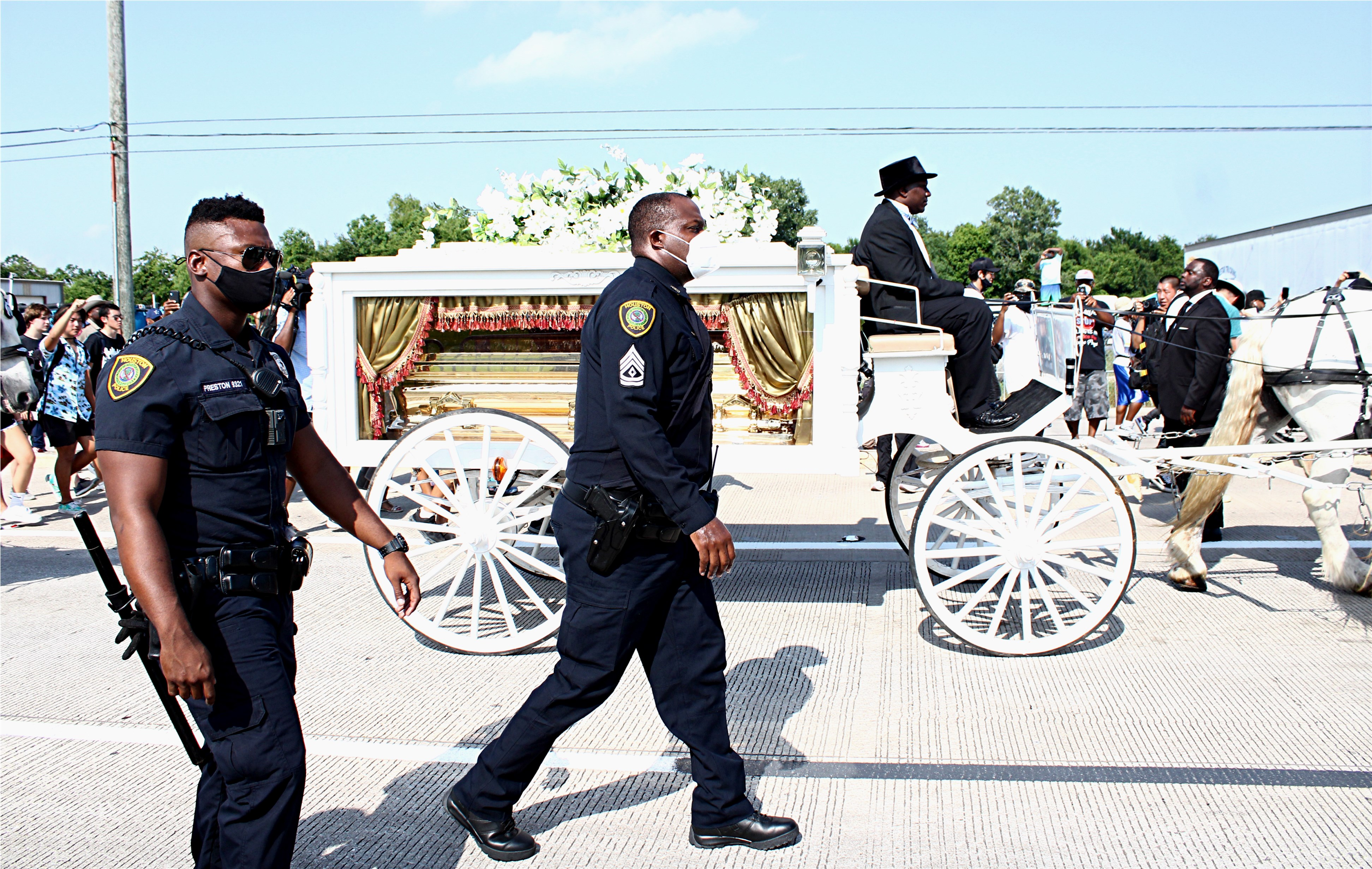
The carriage carrying Floyd's casket to his burial in Pearland, Texas, on June 9, 2020

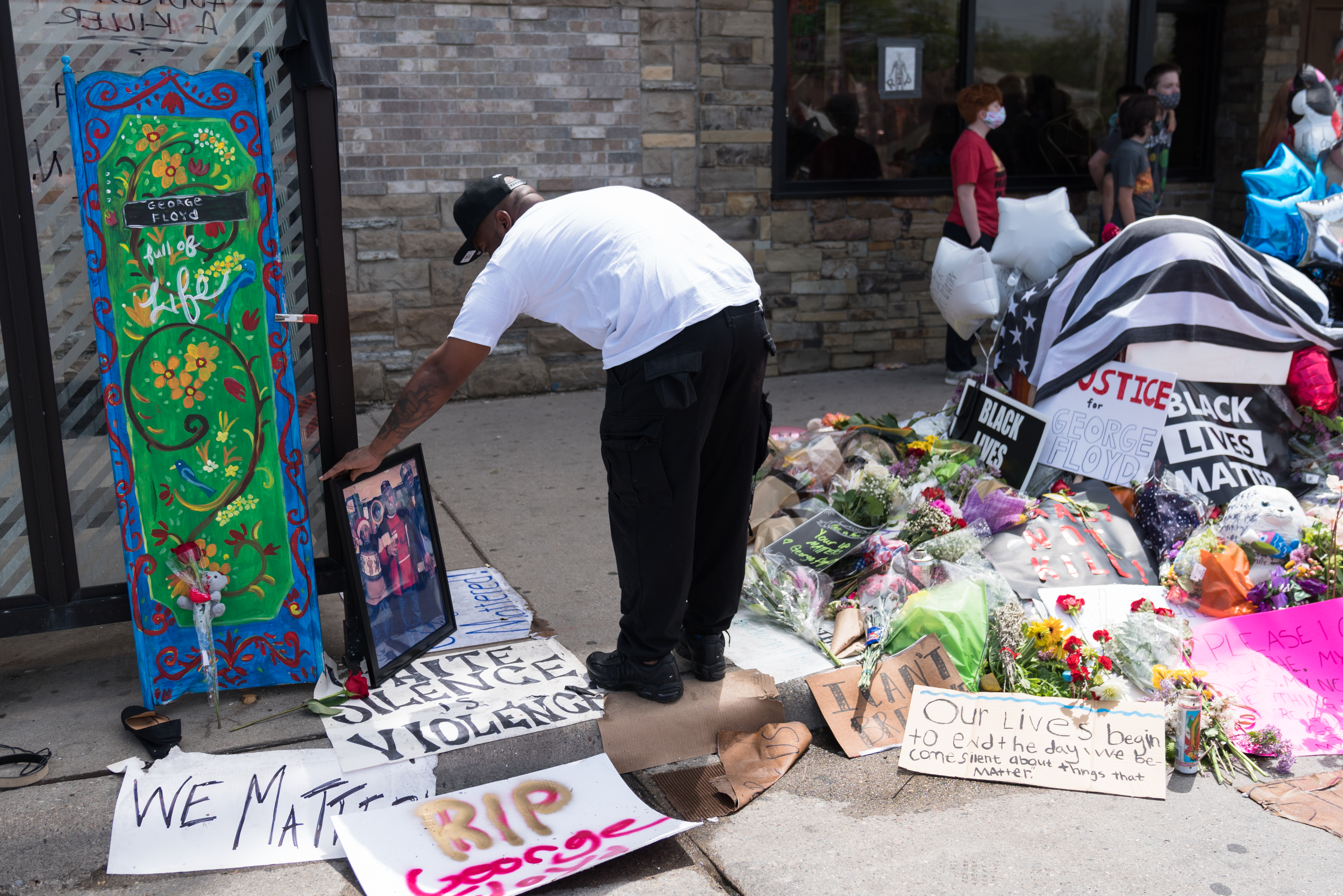
Memorial to Floyd two days after his murder

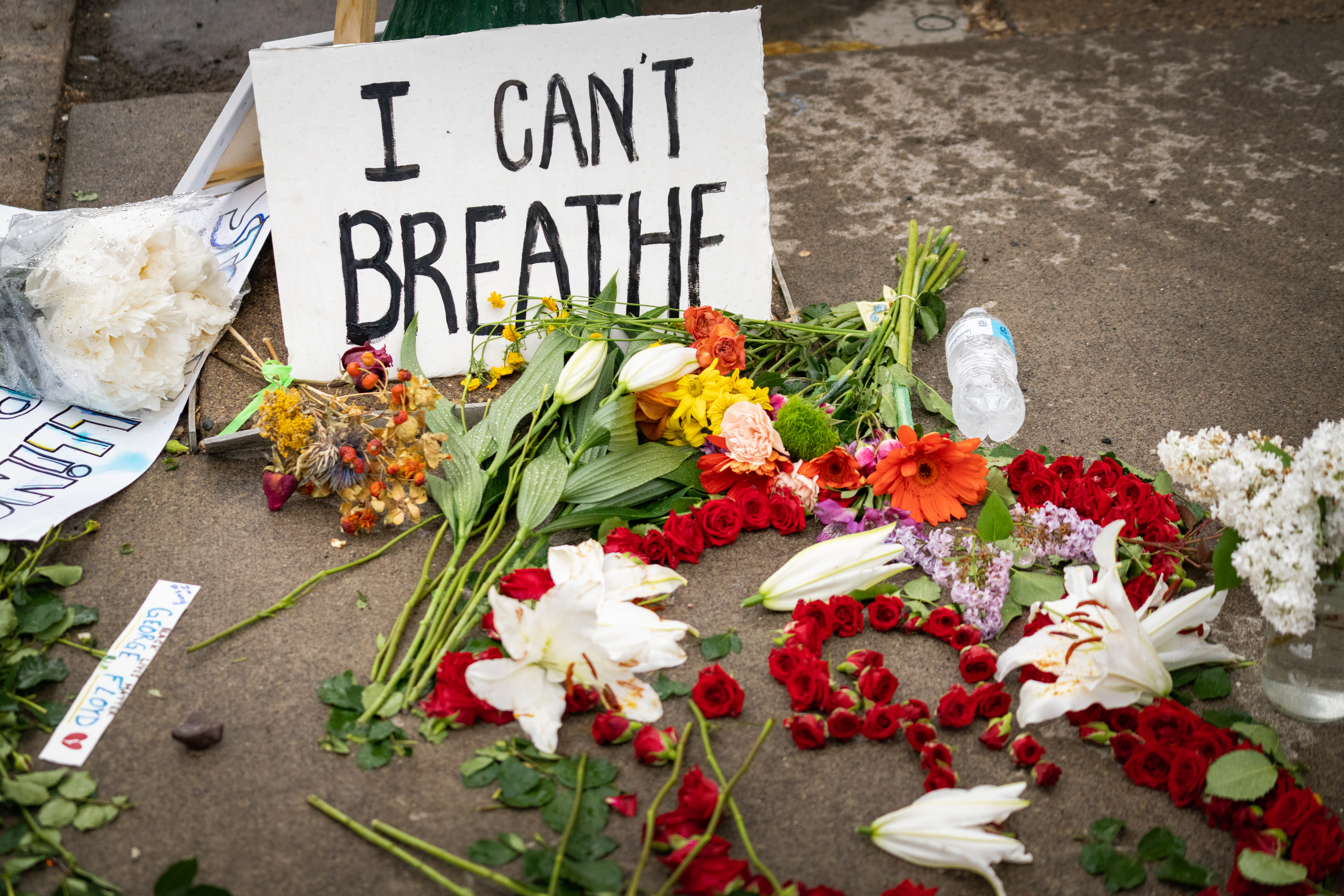
Makeshift memorial near site of murder

Several memorial services were held in honor of George Floyd. On June 4, 2020, a memorial service for Floyd took place in Minneapolis. Al Sharpton delivered the eulogy. Services were held in North Carolina with a public viewing and private service on June 6 and in Houston on June 8 and 9. Floyd was buried next to his mother in Pearland, Texas.

Colleges and universities that created scholarships in Floyd's name included North Central University, which hosted a memorial service for Floyd, Alabama State, Oakwood University, Missouri State University, Southeast Missouri State, Ohio University, Buffalo State College, and Copper Mountain College. Amid nationwide protests over Floyd's murder, Netflix CEO Reed Hastings and his wife, Patty Quillin, made a $120 million donation to be split equally among Morehouse College, Spelman College, and the United Negro College Fund. The donation was the largest ever made to historically black colleges and universities.

In 2020, social-media-based artists and activists posted tributes to Floyd; one of the more popular tributes was a digital illustration created by Shirien Damra, which had more than 3.4 million likes on Instagram. Damra's work was later turned into painted murals in many communities and used in other ways. Other viral social-media-based tributes to Floyd were made by Nikkolas Smith, Stormy Nesbit, Dani Coke, Robin Hilkey, and Miriam Mosqueda.

Street artists globally created murals honoring Floyd. Depictions included Floyd as a ghost in Minneapolis, as an angel in Houston, and as a saint weeping blood in Naples. A mural on the International Wall in Belfast commissioned by Festival of the People (Féile an Phobail) and Visit West Belfast (Fáilte Feirste Thiar) featured a large portrait of Floyd above a tableau showing Chauvin kneeling on Floyd's neck while the three other officers turn their backs and each covers his eyes, ears, or mouth in the manner of the three wise monkeys ("See no evil, hear no evil, speak no evil"). One Houston mural is on the side of Scott Food Mart in the Third Ward, while the other is on the property of The Breakfast Klub restaurant in Midtown. A childhood friend of Floyd's said that Floyd would never "have imagined that this is the tragic way people would know his name."

A GoFundMe account to support Floyd's funeral costs and benefit his family broke the site's record for number of individual donations.

By June 6, murals had been created in many cities, including Manchester, Dallas, Miami, Idlib, Los Angeles, Nairobi, Oakland, Strombeek-Bever, Berlin, Pensacola, and La Mesa. The mural in Manchester was defaced with graffiti, resulting in a Greater Manchester Police investigation into the incident. Beyond the creation of the mural, Floyd's murder has also increased public debate in the United Kingdom over allegations of institutional racism. Protest graffiti has also been put up throughout Los Angeles, offering phrases such as "I Can't Breathe", "Say Their Names", and others. The phrase "Black Lives Matter" has also been used often in the outpouring of protest regarding Floyd's murder. The phrase has been especially popular on social media platforms. Since Floyd's murder, there has also been a global outcry for memorials commemorating bigoted individuals to be demolished.

A bill proposed by US Representative Sheila Jackson Lee, the George Floyd Law Enforcement Trust and Integrity Act, was designed to reduce police brutality and establish national policing standards and accreditations. In addition to the work of lawmakers, there has been an outcry from leaders in a variety of fields. Researcher Temitope Oriola, author of 'How police departments can identify and oust killer cops', wrote the piece intending to prevent more deaths mirroring Floyd's. Oxiris Barbot, former New York City Health Commissioner, wrote an article describing Floyd's murder as "collective moral injury" and compared it to "the sustained acuity of health inequities playing out in horrifying details through the COVID-19 pandemic." Religious leaders have also been called upon to address violence taking place against black Americans.

The length of time that Chauvin was initially believed to have had his knee on Floyd's neck, eight minutes and 46 seconds, was widely commemorated as a "moment of silence" to honor Floyd.

Floyd's murder was featured prominently in The Economist, with the magazine running an obituary, multiple articles, and numerous reader letters, ultimately making Floyd's legacy its June 13 cover story. It wrote that his legacy "[is] the rich promise of social reform."

In August 2020, musician John Mellencamp released the song "A Pawn in the White Man's Game", a reworking of Bob Dylan's 1964 song "Only a Pawn in Their Game", which reflected on the killing of Civil Rights activist Medgar Evers. Mellencamp's version featured new lyrics that reflected the racial conflicts in the U.S. that followed in the wake of Floyd's murder. Mellencamp also posted a video on YouTube, which included a warning that it might be seen as "inappropriate for some viewers". The video featured footage of protesters and police clashing violently in 2020 and 1968. YouTube eventually removed the video, claiming it violated its community guidelines.

On September 18, 2020, the Minneapolis City Council approved designating the section of Chicago Avenue between 37th and 39th Streets as George Perry Floyd Jr. Place, with a marker at the intersection with 38th Street where the incident took place. The intersection had been the location of a makeshift memorial that emerged the day after his murder.

On October 6, 2020, Amnesty International delivered a letter with one million signatures from around the world to the US Attorney General William Barr to demand justice for George Floyd. The human rights advocacy group demanded that the police officers involved in the murder of George Floyd be held accountable. The NAACP, which has already published a criminal justice fact sheet, issued a statement voicing its support for the protests taking place demanding justice for George Floyd.

On May 21, 2021, Bridgett Floyd gave a $25,000 check from the George Floyd Memorial Foundation to Fayetteville State University in Fayetteville, North Carolina, to be used for scholarships. On the same day, the city declared May 25 George Floyd Jr. Day.

After Floyd's murder, a petition was started on the public benefit corporation website Change.org, asking for "Justice for George Floyd". The petition quickly gathered more signatures than any other petition that had been placed on the site, amounting to roughly five million in the first few days. The petition was considered a "success" with the sentencing of Derek Chauvin. At the time that the petition was closed to new signers, it had attained close to twenty million signatures.

In May 2022, a biography of Floyd titled His Name Is George Floyd was published, written by Washington Post journalists Robert Samuels and Toluse Olorunnipa.

=== Attempts for a posthumous pardon ===
In 2022, the Texas Board of Pardons and Paroles declined to issue a posthumous pardon for the 2004 drug raid that led to Floyd's criminal conviction.

== Personal life ==
Floyd was the oldest of five siblings and had five children, including two daughters (aged 6 and 22 at the time of his murder) and an adult son. He also had two grandchildren.

In August 2017, Floyd met his girlfriend Courteney Ross in Minneapolis. In early 2020, the two separated.

== Discography ==
Appears on (as Big Floyd):

- DJ Screw – Ballin in da Mall (Screwed Up Records, Cassette, 1997), appears as feature on "Tired of Ballin (Freestyle)" by Tela
- Diary of the Originator (Chapter 319 – Floyd & Screw) (Screwed Up Records, CD, 1998), appears on "Freestyle Sugar Hill"
- Presidential Playas – Block Party the Album (Presidential Records, CD, 2000), appears on "Presidential Playas"
- Diary of the Originator: Chapter 7 (Ballin in the Mall) (Screwed Up Records, CD, 2004), appears on "Freestyle"

== See also ==
- Death of Samson Chukwu, a Nigerian asylum seeker killed in Switzerland under similar circumstances in 2001
- Death of Abisay Cruz, a Latino man who died after police knelt on his neck and back in Montreal in 2025
- Death of Oury Jalloh, a Guinean man who died in police custody in Germany in 2005
- List of unarmed African Americans killed by law enforcement officers in the United States
- Lists of killings by law enforcement officers in the United States
