= The 1619 Project: Born on the Water =

2021 picture book by Nikole Hanna-Jones and Renée Watson

- Author: Nikole Hannah-Jones; Renée Watson
- Illustrator: Nikkolas Smith
- Language: English
- Genre: Picture book; Poetry
- Publisher: Kokila
- Publication date: November 16, 2021
- Publication place: United States
- Pages: 48
- ISBN: 9780593307359

The 1619 Project: Born on the Water is a children's picture book, written in verse, by Nikole Hannah-Jones and Renée Watson, with illustrations by Nikkolas Smith. The book was announced in April 2021 as a companion book to The 1619 Project: A New Origin Story, both inspired by Hannah-Jones' The 1619 Project.

== Reception ==
The book received a starred review from Publishers Weekly, which noted how "the authors clearly but non-graphically confront the horror of chattel slavery." According to the reviewer, Smith also used different styles to convey different emotions, such as a "saturated palette to create emotionally evocative scenes", while "multicolor palettes illustrate scenes of peace and joy."

Writing for The Horn Book, Autumn Allen praised the poetry and the art, calling the latter "dynamic, expressive, and expansive" and able to show the "emotional journey of a resilient people." In a review for the School Library Journal, Claire Moore, who gave The 1619 Project a star, praised the writing and the art.

Born on the Water ranked #1 on The New York Times Best Seller List Children's Picture Book category, on December 5, 2021. Time for Kids a division of Time included Born on the Water on the list, "The 10 Best YA and Children's Books of 2021."
