= 1776 Commission =

Advisory committee created by Donald Trump

PDF of the 1776 Commission Report

The 1776 Commission, also nicknamed the 1776 Project, is an advisory committee established in September 2020 by then-U.S. president Donald Trump to support what he called "patriotic education". The commission released The 1776 Report on January 18, 2021, two days before the end of Trump's first term of office. Historians overwhelmingly criticized the report, saying it was "filled with errors and partisan politics". The commission was terminated by the successive President Joe Biden on January 20, 2021, his first day in office. It was re-established by Trump in January 2025.

== History ==
The 1776 Commission was conceived partly as a response to The New York Times' 1619 Project, which deals with systemic racism and explores American history through an African-American framework. The first publication from the 1619 Project was in The New York Times Magazine in August 2019.

Trump first spoke of giving students a "patriotic education" on September 2, 2020. He announced plans for the commission in a speech on September 17, 2020, in which he contended that a "twisted web of lies" regarding systemic racism was being taught in U.S. schools, calling it "a form of child abuse". He reiterated his intention to establish the commission in a proclamation on October 6, 2020.

Various federal laws prohibit the federal government from directly regulating school curricula, which are determined by school districts under rules established by state governments. However, the federal government influences state and local decisions through funding.

== Establishment ==
Trump's speech on September 17, 2020

'White House Conference on American History' – video from September 17, 2020

On November 2, the day before the 2020 U.S. elections, Trump established the commission by executive order. It would consist of 18 members, appointed by the president to two-year terms, who would write a report on "core principles of the American founding and how these principles may be understood to further enjoyment of 'the blessings of liberty'".

Trump appointed the commission's members on December 18, 2020, and the commission held its first meeting on January 5, 2021.

=== Goals ===
The commission's goal was to end what it calls the "radicalized view of American history" which has "vilified [the United States'] Founders and [its] founding". In response to the work of figures such as Howard Zinn and efforts such as the 1619 Project, the 1776 Commission sought to increase "patriotic education" via a centralized federal approach to an American nationalist curriculum. This effort is linked to Trump's wider attacks on critical race theory.

The commission was also intended to promote these concepts at national parks, landmarks, and monuments among other federal properties, and federal agencies were instructed to provide grants and initiatives in a way that prioritized those supporting "the American Founding".

=== Members ===
The 18-member commission was composed of conservative activists, politicians, and intellectuals, and included no professional experts in American history. Trump appointed the Commission's members on December 18, 2020. The chair was Larry Arnn, the president of conservative Hillsdale College, and the co-chair was Carol Swain, a Black conservative and a former professor at Vanderbilt Law School. Other appointees included his former domestic policy advisor Brooke Rollins; Charles R. Kesler, a Claremont Graduate University professor and editor of the conservative journal Claremont Review of Books; Ned Ryun, a Bush speechwriter; Charlie Kirk, founder of Turning Point USA; Phil Bryant, Republican former governor of Mississippi; classical historian Victor Davis Hanson; John Gibbs, a former Trump appointee; Scott McNealy, founder of online curriculum company Curikki; Peter Kirsanow, a black Civil Rights Commission member; Thomas Lindsay, a political science professor; Michael Farris, a lawyer and political science professor; Jerry C. Davis, controversial longtime president of College of the Ozarks, and former Congressman Bob McEwen. Trump also selected then-Housing and Urban Development Secretary Ben Carson to serve on the committee.

== The 1776 Report ==
=== Contents ===
The commission released the 41-page "The 1776 Report" on January 18, 2021, two days before the end of Trump's term and the inauguration of Joe Biden. The report does not include citations or footnotes, and does not identify its main authors. About half the pages in the report were appendices.

Among other things, the document identifies "progressivism" and "racism and identity politics" as "challenges to America's principles", and likens them to "communism", "slavery", and "fascism". It refers to the pro-slavery U.S. politician and former U.S. vice president John C. Calhoun as "the leading forerunner of identity politics" and criticizes some aspects of the civil rights movement. The document also describes American universities as "often today ... hotbeds of anti-Americanism, libel, and censorship", and criticizes feminist movements. It concludes with recommendations to promote positive stories and images of the country's founders at home, in schools, and in the arts, among other things.

=== Reception ===
Historians condemned the report, saying it was "filled with errors and partisan politics", factual inaccuracies, a lack of scholarship, and use of prior work without attribution. The American Historical Association (AHA), in a statement cosigned by 47 other historical societies, stated that the report was completed "without any consultation with professional historians of the United States". On January 19, 2021, the Association of University Presses released a statement: "While we leave it to historians to offer a detailed rebuttal of the document's inaccuracies – if any should choose to do so – we note that it is plagued by procedural deficiencies that would render it unpublishable as a serious work of scholarship."

James Grossman, the executive director of the AHA, criticized Trump's push for so-called "patriotic education", writing that genuinely patriotic history is a rigorous effort to study the past honestly and acknowledge complexity, rather than "cheerleading", "nationalist propaganda", or "simplistic and inaccurate narrative of unique virtue and perpetual progress". Grossman described the 1776 Commission's report as "a hack job" that was "not a work of history" but of "cynical politics". Grossman said, "This report skillfully weaves together myths, distortions, deliberate silences, and both blatant and subtle misreading of evidence to create a narrative and an argument that few respectable professional historians, even across a wide interpretive spectrum, would consider plausible, never mind convincing."

Historian Timothy Messer-Kruse likened the content of the report to "every moldy trope of 1950s fifth-grade civics books" and wrote that it misrepresented the beliefs of founding father John Jay as expressed in Federalist No. 2. Historian Eric Rauchway criticized the report for misreading John Winthrop's "City upon a Hill" speech and for the report's claims regarding the civil rights movement. Historian Alexis Coe, a biographer of George Washington, said the report was riddled with "errors, distortions, and outright lies" and mischaracterized Washington's involvement with slavery. Kevin M. Kruse and other historians criticized the report for suggesting that Martin Luther King Jr. would have opposed affirmative action, noting that King in fact endorsed affirmative action during his life. Even historians who were critical of the 1619 Project, such as Sean Wilentz of Princeton University, criticized the report of the 1776 Commission. Wilentz described the report as "the flip side of those polemics" and "basically a political document" that "reduces history to hero worship".

Historians also noted that portions of the report had been copied without attribution from earlier writings by its authors, including a 2008 op-ed by Thomas Lindsay published in Inside Higher Ed and a 2002 Heritage Foundation essay and Intercollegiate Studies Institute essay by Matthew Spalding, the commission's executive director.

Commentator Eugene Scott criticized the commission's report for suggesting "that identity politics is something unique to those outside of the Trump administration"; Scott writes that Trump's rhetoric and Trumpism "has been rooted in identity politics": specifically, a prioritization of demographic groups that are "largely White, Christian and appealing to traditional gender norms". Writing for Slate, Rebecca Onion described the report as "a screed forwarded by a Fox-poisoned aunt, one that might best be politely ignored" and noted historian Diana Butler Bass's fear that the report was "'a huge gift' to white evangelical Trump supporters, who have long taught this vision of history to children who are enrolled in Christian schools or home-schooled." Jeff Sharlet of Vanity Fair compared the report's section on identity politics to Norwegian terrorist Anders Behring Breivik's justification for the 2011 Norway attacks in his manifesto 2083: A European Declaration of Independence.

Commission members Victor Davis Hanson and Mike Gonzalez defended the report. Hanson argued that the report did not "whitewash the continuance of many injustices" in U.S. history and defended the report's declaration that "progressivism" was at odds with American values, while Gonzalez, a senior fellow of the Heritage Foundation, criticized media coverage of the report and argued that Biden's disbanding of the commission was an outcome of "the woke left" waging a "war on U.S. history".

== Termination and reinstatement ==
On January 20, 2021, hours after he was inaugurated as Trump's successor, President Joe Biden issued an executive order dissolving the 1776 Commission. The report was removed from the White House website, although the National Archives and Records Administration archived the report, along with the entire Trump White House website. In May 2021, Matthew Spalding, the commission's executive director, announced the commission would resume its activities in a non-governmental capacity. In November 2021, Jake Silverstein noted in an article for The New York Times that state level anti-critical race theory laws that had passed following the 1776 Commission's end contained language and intent similar to the 1776 Commission's final report.

1776 Action, a 501(c)(4) group headed by Republican operatives that was formed after the dissolution of the 1776 Commission, takes its name from the Commission. The group, led by former aides to Ben Carson and Newt Gingrich, promotes what it calls "patriotic education" and says that it aims to combat "anti-American indoctrination"; it proposes a Trump-inspired "1776 pledge" for officials and candidates. The group has promoted an anti-"critical race theory" bill that passed in New Hampshire, and endorsed candidates in the 2021 Virginia gubernatorial election and in school-board races in Iowa. The 2024 Republican Party Platform promised to resurrect the 1776 Commission. On January 29, 2025, President Trump issued Executive Order 14190, which reinstated the 1776 Commission.

== See also ==
- 1776 Unites
- Censorship of school curricula in the United States
- Commission on Race and Ethnic Disparities
- Commission on Unalienable Rights
- Founding Fathers of the United States
- Historical negationism
- National Garden of American Heroes
