= Nikole Hannah-Jones =

American journalist (born 1976)

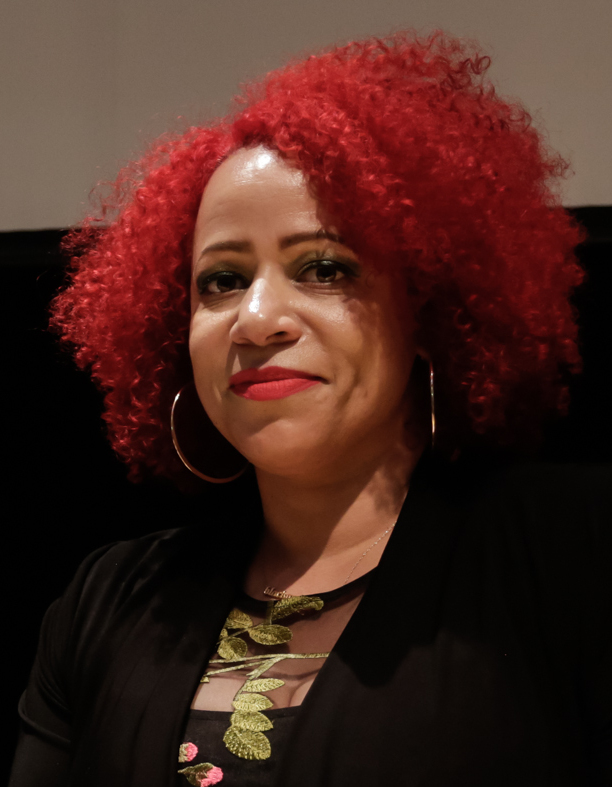
- Hannah-Jones in 2018
- Born: Nikole Sheri Hannah; April 9, 1976 (age 50); Waterloo, Iowa, U.S.
- Education: University of Notre Dame (BA); University of North Carolina at Chapel Hill (MA)
- Occupation: Journalist
- Years active: 2003–present
- Known for: Investigative journalism, activism
- Spouse: Faraji Hannah-Jones
- Children: 1
- Awards: MacArthur Fellowship (2017); Pulitzer Prize (2020)

Nikole Sheri Hannah-Jones (born April 9, 1976) is an American investigative journalist known for her coverage of racial discrimination in American schools and for her work on The 1619 Project, for which she won the 2020 Pulitzer Prize for Commentary.

Hannah-Jones has been a staff writer at The New York Times Magazine since 2015 and was awarded a MacArthur Fellowship in 2017. Hannah-Jones is the inaugural Knight Chair in Race and Journalism at the Howard University School of Communications, where she also founded the Center for Journalism and Democracy.

== Early life and education ==
Hannah-Jones was born in Waterloo, Iowa, to father Milton Hannah, who is African-American, and mother Cheryl A. Novotny, who is white and of Czech and English descent. Hannah-Jones is the second of their three daughters. She was raised Catholic.

Hannah-Jones and her sister attended predominantly white schools as part of a voluntary program of desegregation busing. She attended Waterloo West High School, where she wrote for the high-school newspaper and graduated in 1994.

After high school, Hannah-Jones attended the University of Notre Dame, where she earned a Bachelor of Arts degree in history and African-American studies in 1998.

In 1995, in response to an article published in the Notre Dame student newspaper that called American Indians "savages", Hannah-Jones replied with a letter to the editor titled "Modern Savagery." She stated: "I find it hard to believe that any member of the white race can have the audacity and hypocrisy to call any other culture savage. The white race is the biggest murderer, rapist, pillager and thief of the modern world....The crimes they committed were unnecessarily cruel and can only be described as acts of the devil."

In 2003, she graduated with a master's degree from the University of North Carolina Hussman School of Journalism and Media, where she was a Roy H. Park Fellow.

== Career ==
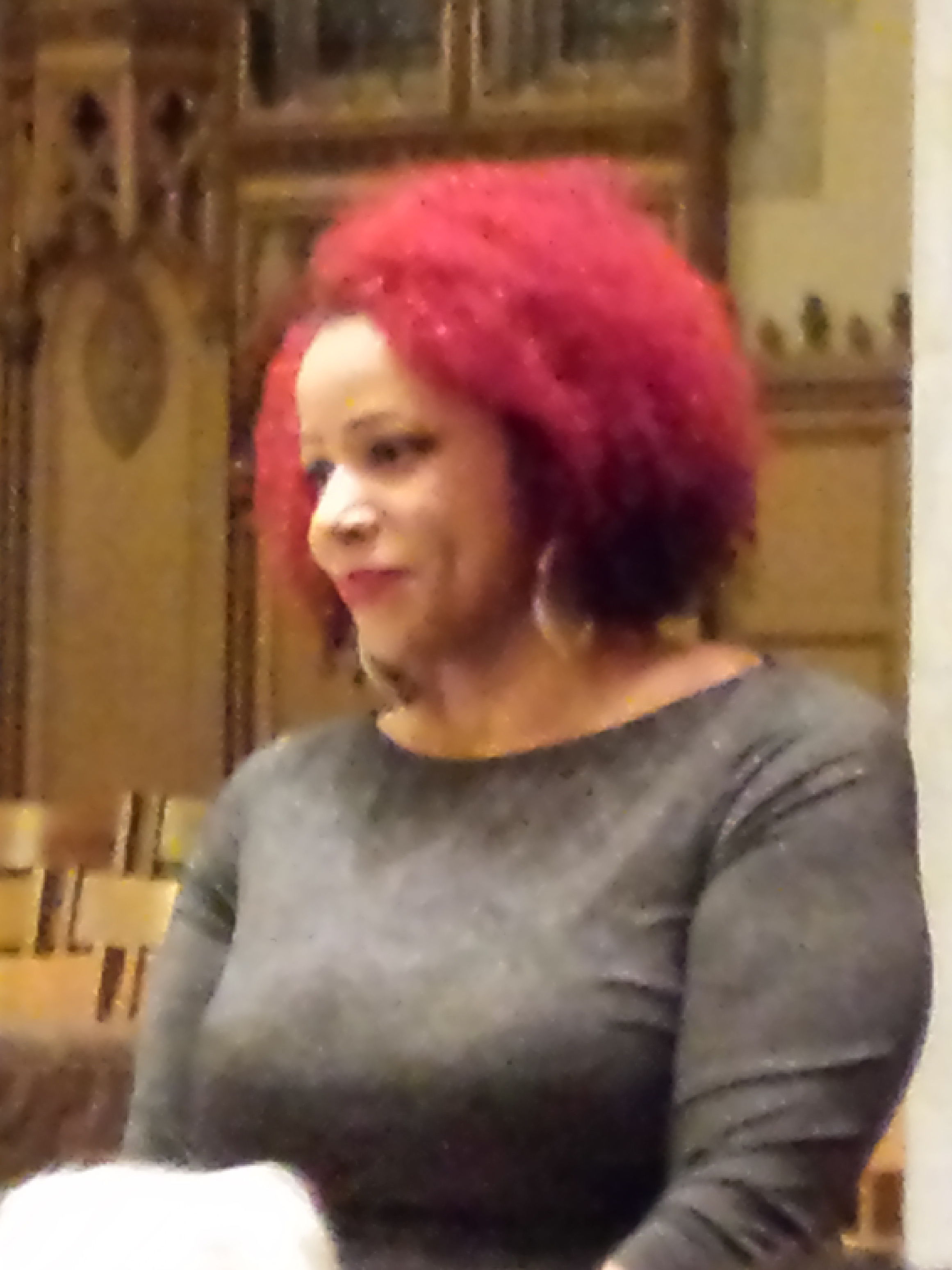
Hannah-Jones with attendees after giving a talk in Rochester, New York in 2017

In 2003, Hannah-Jones began her career covering education, which included the predominantly African-American Durham Public Schools, for the Raleigh News & Observer, a position she held for three years.

In 2006, Hannah-Jones moved to Portland, Oregon, where she wrote for The Oregonian for six years. During this time, her assignments included feature work, demographics, and then government and census beats.

In 2007, to commemorate the 40th anniversary of the 1965 Watts riots, Hannah-Jones wrote about the impact on the community of the National Advisory Commission on Civil Disorders, also known as the Kerner Commission.

From 2008 to 2009, Hannah-Jones received a fellowship from the Institute for Advanced Journalism Studies which enabled her to travel to Cuba to study universal healthcare and Cuba's educational system under Raúl Castro.

In 2011, she joined the nonprofit news organization ProPublica, which is based in New York City, where she covered civil rights and continued research she had started in Oregon on redlining and in-depth investigative reporting on the lack of enforcement of the Fair Housing Act for minorities. Hannah-Jones also spent time in Tuscaloosa, Alabama, where the decision in Brown v. Board of Education had little effect.

In 2021, Hannah-Jones was elected as a member of the American Academy of Arts and Sciences.

In 2023, Hannah-Jones was awarded the honorary degree of Doctor of Humane Letters by Chicago State University at its 370th commencement ceremony.

=== The New York Times Magazine ===
In 2015, Hannah-Jones became a staff reporter for The New York Times Magazine. She has written about topics such as racial segregation, desegregation and resegregation in American schools, and housing discrimination. Her work often focuses on institutional racism.

Her work on racial inequalities has been particularly influential and is cited widely. Hannah-Jones reported on the school district where teenager Michael Brown had been shot, one of the "most segregated, impoverished districts in the entire state" of Missouri. Reviewer Laura Moser of Slate praised her report on school resegregation, which showed how educational inequality may have been a factor in the death of Brown.

Hannah-Jones was a 2017 Emerson Fellow at the New America Foundation and a 2017 recipient of the MacArthur Foundation fellowship. The award cited her "chronicling the persistence of racial segregation in American society, particularly in education, and reshaping national conversations around education reform."

=== Ida B. Wells Society for Investigative Reporting ===
In 2016, Nikole Hannah-Jones, along with Ron Nixon, Corey Johnson, and Topher Sanders, launched the Ida B. Wells Society for Investigative Reporting, in Memphis, Tennessee, to promote investigative journalism. The organization places "emerging journalists from historically underrepresented communities" into paid internships at news organizations and offers workshops and trainings.

=== 1619 Project ===
In August 2019, Hannah-Jones launched The 1619 Project in The New York Times Magazine "to reframe the country's history by placing the consequences of slavery and the contributions of black Americans at the very center of [the] national narrative." It was timed to coincide with the 400th anniversary of the arrival of the first enslaved Africans in Virginia. The project featured essays by a combination of staff writers and academics including Princeton historian Kevin M. Kruse, Harvard-trained lawyer Bryan Stevenson, Princeton sociologist Matthew Desmond, and SUNY historian Anne Bailey. In the opening essay, Hannah-Jones wrote: "No aspect of the country that would be formed here has been untouched by the years of slavery that followed." The project also included poems, short fiction, and a photo essay. Originally conceived of as a single special issue, its scope expanded to include a special broadsheet section in the newspaper, live events, and a multi-episode podcast series.

The project has become a leading subject of the American history wars, receiving criticism from historians, both from the political left and the right, who question its historical accuracy. Historians Gordon S. Wood and Leslie M. Harris criticized the project's assertion that "one of the primary reasons the colonists decided to declare their independence from Britain was because they wanted to protect the institution of slavery." The article was "clarified" in March 2020 to read "for some of the colonists". The project initially argued "that the country's true birth date" was in August 1619 with the arrival of enslaved Africans rather than in 1776 with the Declaration of Independence. Speaking to New York Times opinion writer Bret Stephens, Hannah-Jones clarified that this was "always a metaphoric argument."

In 2020, Hannah-Jones won a Pulitzer Prize for Commentary for her work on the 1619 Project. The award cited her "sweeping, provocative and personal essay for the ground-breaking 1619 Project, which seeks to place the enslavement of Africans at the center of America's story, prompting public conversation about the nation's founding and evolution." New York University's Arthur L. Carter Journalism Institute named the 1619 Project as one of the 10 greatest works of journalism in the decade from 2010 to 2019. In 2022, Hannah-Jones was nominated at the NAACP Image Award for Outstanding Literary Work – Nonfiction and was recognized with the Social Justice Impact Award.

In 2020 it was announced that a Hannah-Jones and The New York Times had chosen Lionsgate films for a partnership to produce a wide variety of content based on the 1619 project, such as Feature Films, Television Programming, and more, with Oprah Winfrey serving as a producer. Hannah-Jones was announced as serving as a creative leader and producer for media produced by the partnership, Lionsgate CEO Jon Feltheimer would say the partnership sought "to amplify Nikole's voice and reach across our worldwide platform to marshal all of our top creative relationships to translate her vision into a canon of storytelling for a global audience." In a discussion Hannah-Jones noted she advocated for the involvement of Black Americans descended from the Enslaved at all creative levels. In 2023 the first offering of the partnership, the docuseries The 1619 Project, premiered with Hannah-Jones serving as the presenter. The documentary won an Emmy in 2024.

In January 2022, Hannah-Jones and teacher Sheritta Stokes launched the 1619 Freedom School in Waterloo, Iowa "to serve students whose standardized reading scores show they are the most academically behind." The program "teaches literacy through materials and books that center Black American history and culture" via a four-day-a-week, two-hour literacy enrichment for the Waterloo school district for grade-school students.

=== Howard University ===
In 2021, Hannah-Jones joined Howard University as the inaugural Knight Chair in Race and Journalism. The Knight Foundation endowed the chair with $500,000 as part of a $20 million donation to Howard, composed of $5 million contributions from the Knight Foundation, the MacArthur Foundation, the Ford Foundation, and an anonymous donor.

=== North Star Books + Bar ===
In October 2025, Hannah-Jones announced she was preparing to open a "literary salon and bar" near her home in the Bedford–Stuyvesant neighborhood of Brooklyn in a partnership with three other local entrepreneurs. The bookstore was slated to open in January 2026; as of September 2026, it has not opened.

== Controversies and criticism ==
=== Criticism of the 1619 Project ===
Five historians wrote to The New York Times Magazine to ask the creators of its 1619 Project to issue corrections, including for Hannah-Jones's assertions on the American Revolution and on Lincoln. The correction request was signed by Victoria Bynum of Texas State University, James M. McPherson and Sean Wilentz of Princeton University, James Oakes of the City University of New York, and Gordon S. Wood of Brown University. Historian Leslie M. Harris, who was consulted for the Project, wrote in Politico that she had warned that the idea that the American Revolution was fought to protect slavery was inaccurate, and that the Times made avoidable mistakes.

In the May 2022 issue of the libertarian magazine Reason, reporter Phillip W. Magness criticized the 1619 Project as "junk history". William Simons of the State University of New York at Oneonta, wrote:

Unfortunately, the prescription provided by Hannah-Jones in the conclusion to The 1619 Project for overcoming slavery's legacy of racial inequity is more aspirational than analytic. Certainly, she is correct that rights without substantive economic redress are not enough. It is a tragedy that following the Civil War, the property of masters was not confiscated and redistributed to former slaves. However, Hannah-Jones's agenda—reparations for descendants of slaves, as well as national health care and other social welfare programs for all Americans—provides no cost analysis, details, or assessment of the political climate. In January 2023, it took the US House of Representatives fifteen ballots to even elect a speaker.

=== University of North Carolina tenureship ===
In April 2021, the University of North Carolina announced that Hannah-Jones would join the Hussman School of Journalism and Media in July as the Knight Chair in Race and Investigative Journalism. Following criticism, particularly from conservative groups who expressed disagreement with the 1619 Project and questioned Hannah-Jones's credentials, the University Board of Trustees, presented with the tenure committee's recommendation to approve her application for tenure, instead took no action. Unable to offer tenure without approval by its trustees, UNC announced they would instead offer a fixed five-year contract with an option for tenure review—terms to which Hannah-Jones agreed.

Outraged, more than 40 Hussman faculty members signed a statement criticizing the board's inaction, noting that the previous two Knight Chairs were given tenure and claiming that UNC "unfairly moves the goal posts" by not offering Hannah-Jones the same. The school's Black Caucus also condemned the terms of her contract, and students joined faculty in protests. Hannah-Jones stated: "It's pretty clear that my tenure was not taken up because of political opposition, because of discriminatory views against my viewpoint and, I believe, [because of] my race and my gender." In late June, Hannah-Jones, via a letter from her lawyers, said she would not take a faculty position with the university unless it is offered as a tenured position. On June 30, the Trustees for the University of North Carolina at Chapel Hill voted 9-4 in a closed session to include tenure in the position offer.

Hannah-Jones refused the position at North Carolina and accepted a tenured position at Howard University instead. She said, "Once the news broke and I started to see the extent of the political interference, particularly the reporting on Walter Hussman, it became really clear to me that I just could not work at a school named after Walter Hussman. To be a person who has stood for what I stand for and have any integrity whatsoever, I just couldn't see how I could do that."

After the incident Hannah-Jones "filed a complaint with and was issued a right to sue letter by the EEOC and was prepared to litigate against her alma mater." In July 2022, her lawyers announced that she had reached a settlement with the school for less than $75,000. As part of the settlement, the school agreed to commit to a more "inclusive" search process, hire an additional trauma-informed therapist, and set aside funds for the meetings of the Carolina Black Caucus.

=== Fireworks tweet ===
In June 2020, Hannah-Jones apologized for retweeting a conspiracy theory claiming that fireworks were being set off by "government agents" to dampen the Black Lives Matter movement.

=== Education of her daughter ===
In 2016, Hannah-Jones penned an influential article in The New York Times Magazine about her decision to send her daughter Najya to Brooklyn's Public School 307—a poorly performing school where 9 of 10 students met federal poverty standards—despite having the financial means to send her daughter to a better school. In it, she argued that doing so would "help to integrate [the school] economically" and that "the presence of even a handful of middle-class families made it less likely that a school would be neglected." Hannah-Jones was awarded the 2017 Hillman Prize for Magazine Journalism for her article and it sparked conversations on NPR and in the New York Times Magazine.

In 2026, Hannah-Jones revisited the subject in another Magazine article that "set social media abuzz", after her daughter chose to enroll at a more competitive high school. She wrote that "these days I feel that I failed both my values and my child ... by not choosing the 'best' school for her". Some of the strongest criticism came from Najya herself: "Sometimes I wish instead of always thinking about other kids, you would have thought about me. I never really got the education I wanted." Mike Bird, editor at The Economist, called her "willingness to deploy a child as an ideological experiment... jaw-dropping." Henry Mack, Florida's education commissioner and former U.S. assistant secretary of labor, wrote on X:

Nikole Hannah-Jones got a MacArthur 'genius' grant and a magazine cover for putting her daughter in a failing school as a civic sacrament. Ten years later the kid can't do fractions, failed the algebra exam after collecting A's, and asked her mother why other children's disadvantage mattered more than her own education. That's not integration. That's a byline with a body count of one.

Writing for The Atlantic, Idrees Kahloon contended that "Hannah-Jones's public mea culpa deserves respect", and acknowledged "Asking that parents hold fast to their local public schools, even if the shortcomings are too serious to ignore, is too much to ask." Kahloon said that "The goal was laudable, but the failure to achieve it suggests that even committed parents cannot, on their own, overcome all of the factors that keep a troubled school from becoming an excellent one—a dearth of leadership, the commitment of its teachers, and the behavior of other students."

== Personal life ==
Hannah-Jones lives in the Bedford–Stuyvesant neighborhood of Brooklyn with her husband, Faraji Hannah-Jones, and their daughter Najya.

== Awards ==
- 2007, 2008, 2010: Society of Professional Journalists, Pacific Northwest, Excellence in Journalism Award
- 2012: Gannett Foundation Innovation in Watchdog Journalism Award
- 2013: Sidney Award
- 2013: Columbia University, Paul Tobenkin Memorial Award
- 2015: National Awards for Education Reporting, first prize, beat reporting
- 2015: National Association of Black Journalists, Journalist of the Year
- 2015: National Magazine Award finalist, public interest
- 2015: Education Writers Association, Fred M. Hechinger Grand Prize for Distinguished Education Reporting
- 2015: Emerson College President's Award for Civic Leadership
- 2015: The Root 100
- 2016: George Polk Award, radio reporting
- 2017: MacArthur Foundation Fellowship
- 2017: National Magazine Award winner, public interest
- 2019: University of North Carolina at Chapel Hill Distinguished Alumna Award
- 2020: 2020 Pulitzer Prize for Commentary
- 2021: Time magazine 100
- 2022: NAACP Image Award Social Justice Impact Award
- 2022: NAACP Image Award for Outstanding Literary Work – Nonfiction for "The 1619 Project: A New Origin Story"
- 2023: Primetime Emmy Award for Outstanding Documentary or Nonfiction Series for The 1619 Project

== Publications ==
- Hannah-Jones, Nikole. Fields of Lost Dreams: How Race and Racism Have Contributed to the Overrepresentation of Blacks in the Iowa Prison System. 2003. Print.
- Hannah-Jones, Nikole. Living Apart. ProPublica, 2012. Internet resource.
- Hannah-Jones, Nikole. Segregation Now: Investigating America's Racial Divide. 2014. Print.
- Hannah-Jones, Nikole, and Allyson Johnson. The Burden: African Americans and the Enduring Impact of Slavery. Minneapolis, Minn: Highbridge Audio, 2018. Internet resource.
- Hannah-Jones, Nikole, Mary Elliott, Jazmine Hughes, and Jake Silverstein. The 1619 Project: New York Times Magazine, August 18, 2019. 2019. Print.
- Hannah-Jones, Nikole. The 1619 Project: A New Origin Story. 2021. Print.
- Hannah-Jones, Nikole, Renée Watson, and Nikkolas Smith. The 1619 Project – Born on the Water. 2021. Print.
