= Victoria E. Bynum =

American historian

- Occupation: historian

Academic background
- Education: University of California Ph.D., 1987
- Thesis: Unruly women: the relationship between status and behavior among free women of the North Carolina Piedmont, 1840-1865 (1987)

Academic work
- Institutions: Texas State University

Victoria Bynum is a historian specializing in the history of the Southern United States. She is a Distinguished Professor Emeritus of history at Texas State University.

== Career ==
Victoria E. Bynum received her BA at Chico State University in 1979, and her MA and Ph.D from the University of California, San Diego in 1987. Her Ph.D. thesis was "Unruly women: the relationship between status and behavior among free women of the North Carolina Piedmont, 1840-1865". In 1986, she joined the Department of History at Southwest Texas State University.

== Free State of Jones ==
Her book Free State of Jones on the civil war history of Jones County, Mississippi was an inspiration for the 2016 film of the same name. Bynum sold the rights to the book to Universal Studios in 2007. However, Bynum objected to a later book on the subject by John Stauffer and Sally Jenkins, based on the movie's screenplay, which gave the character of Newton Knight a motivating romance.

== 1619 project ==
Bynum was one of the historians that criticized The 1619 Project of the New York Times, pointing out factual errors.

== Works ==
=== Books ===
- Bynum, V.E. (2010). The Long Shadow of the Civil War: Southern Dissent and Its Legacies. University of North Carolina Press. ISBN 978-0-8078-9821-5.
- Bynum, V.E. (2003). The Free State of Jones: Mississippi's Longest Civil War. Fred W. Morrison Series in Southern Studies. University of North Carolina Press. ISBN 978-0-8078-5467-9.
- Bynum, Victoria E. Unruly Women: The Relationship between Status and Behavior Among Free Women of the North Carolina Piedmont, 1840-1865, 1987. (Ph. D. University of California, San Diego, Department of History 1987)
- Bynum, V.E. (2016). Unruly Women: The Politics of Social and Sexual Control in the Old South. Gender and American Culture. University of North Carolina Press. ISBN 978-1-4696-1699-5.

=== Selected articles ===
- Bynum VE. " White Negroes" in Segregated Mississippi: Miscegenation, Racial Identity, and the Law. The Journal of Southern History. 1998 May 1;64(2):247-76. <https://doi.org/10.2307/2587946>
- Bynum, V., 1987. " War within a War": Women's Participation in the Revolt of the North Carolina Piedmont, 1863-1865. Frontiers: A Journal of Women Studies, pp. 43–49. <https://doi.org/10.2307/3346260>
- Bynum, V.E., 2015. The Seduction and Suicide of Mariah Murray: A Civil War Era Tragedy. Ohio Valley History, 15(1), pp. 21–40. <https://muse.jhu.edu/article/582618>
- Tate, A. and Bynum, V.E., 2011. The Long Shadow of the Civil War: Southern Dissent and Its Legacies. The Review of Politics, 73(1), p. 180.
- Bynum, V.E., 2004. Mulattas and Mestizas: Representing Mixed Identities in the American, 1850-2000. The Journal of Southern History, 70(2), p. 434. <https://doi.org/10.2307/27648427>
- Bynum, V.E., 2005. Beyond Bondage: Free Women of Color in the Americas. The Journal of American History, 92(3), p. 974.
- Bynum, V.E., 2011. Mississippi in the Civil War: The Home Front. The Southern Quarterly, 48(2), p. 137.
