= Reginald Dwayne Betts =

American poet, memoirist, and teacher

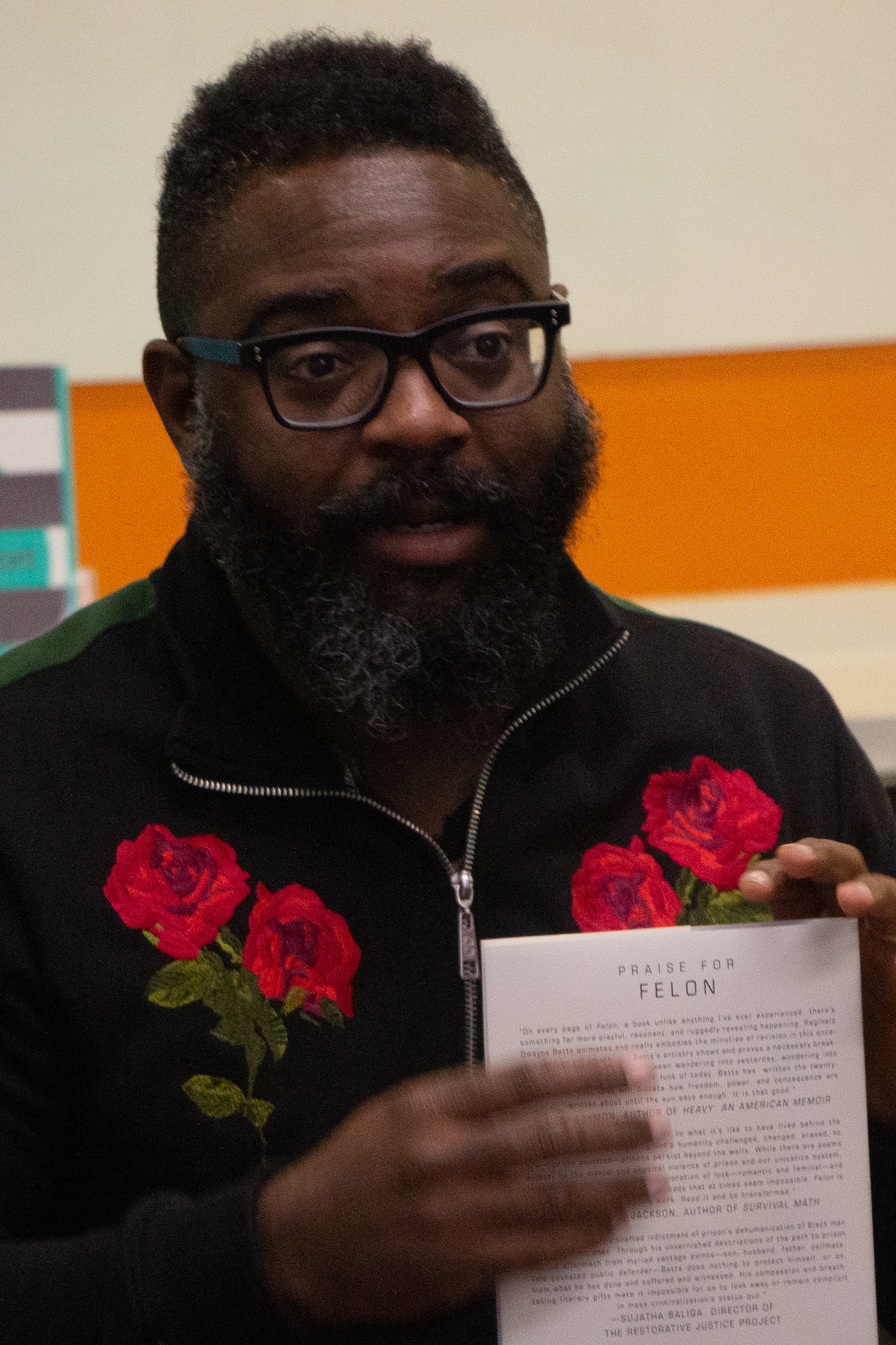
- Betts in 2019
- Born: November 5, 1980 (age 45); Maryland, U.S.
- Education: Prince George's Community College; University of Maryland, College Park (BA); Warren Wilson College (MA); Yale University (JD)
- Occupations: Poet; teacher; lawyer
- Criminal charge(s): Armed carjacking, armed robbery, use of a firearm during a felony
- Criminal penalty: 9 years imprisonment
- Criminal status: Released (served 8 years, 3 months)
- Spouse: Terese Robertson Betts
- Children: 2 sons
- Writing career
- Notable awards: Guggenheim Fellowship (2018); MacArthur Fellowship (2021)
- Website: www.dwaynebetts.com

Reginald Dwayne Betts (born November 5, 1980) is an American poet, legal scholar, educator and prison reform advocate. At age 16 he committed an armed carjacking, was prosecuted as an adult, and was sentenced to nine years in prison for three felonies.

He started reading and writing poetry during his incarceration. After his release, Betts earned an M.F.A. in Creative Writing from Warren Wilson College, and a Juris Doctor degree from Yale Law School. He served on President Barack Obama's Coordinating Council of the Office of Juvenile Justice and Delinquency Prevention. He founded Freedom Reads, an organization that gives incarcerated people access to books. In September 2021, Betts was awarded a MacArthur Fellowship.

== Early life, crime, and imprisonment ==
Born in Maryland, Betts was in gifted programs throughout his youth, and in high school was an honors student and class treasurer at Suitland High School in the Washington, D.C. suburb of District Heights, Maryland.

=== Crime ===
On December 7, 1996, at the age of 16, he and a friend drove a stolen car to the Springfield Mall in Virginia, where they found a man asleep in a car. Betts pointed a loaded pistol at the man's face through the car window, demanded that he get out of the car and give them his wallet and keys, and carjacked the car. The next day the two of them tried to use a credit card that they had stolen from the man, and they were arrested.

=== Sentencing ===
Betts was charged as an adult with six felonies. He plea bargained, and pled guilty to carjacking, attempted robbery, and use of a firearm during a felony. While he faced a maximum sentence of life plus 13 years, he was sentenced to nine years in adult prison.

=== Prison ===
He spent more than eight years in prison (including14 months in solitary confinement, most of which was for his twice assaulting guards), and was released at 24 years of age. While in prison he completed high school and began to read and write poetry.

Speaking at the NGC Bocas Lit Fest in 2016, he said:

"I was in solitary confinement.... You could call out for a book and someone would slide one to you. Frequently, you would not know who gave it to you. Somebody slid The Black Poets edited by Dudley Randall. In that book I read Robert Hayden for the first time, Sonia Sanchez, Lucille Clifton. I saw the poet as not just utilitarian but as serving art. In a poem you can give somebody a whole world. Before that, I had thought of being a writer, writing mostly essays and maybe, one day, a novel. But at that moment I decided to become a poet."

In prison, he was renamed Shahid, an Arabic name meaning "witness".

== Education, writing, and activism after prison ==
After serving an eight-year prison term, Betts found a job working at Karibu Books in Bowie, Maryland. At the store, he was eventually promoted to manager and founded a book club for African American boys, while attending Prince George's Community College in Largo, Maryland. He later became a teacher of poetry in Washington, DC, and in 2013, he taught in the writing program (WLP) at Emerson College.

Betts is the national spokesman for the Campaign for Youth Justice, and speaks out for juvenile-justice reform. He also visits detention centers and inner-city schools, and talks to at-risk young people.

In 2012, President Barack Obama announced that Betts had been named a member of the Coordinating Council on Juvenile Justice and Delinquency Prevention.

In 2016, Betts graduated from Yale Law School with a J.D. degree, and later began coursework for a Ph.D. in law at Yale. In September 2017, the Connecticut Bar Examining Committee recommended him for admission, after the bar had rejected his initial application for membership.

After Yale, he was awarded a Liman Fellowship, a program for Yale Law graduates to spend a year working in public interest law, and represented clients in the New Haven Public Defender's Office. He also clerked for the Honorable Theodore McKee in the Third Circuit Court of Appeals.

Betts is currently an Associate Research Scholar in Law at Yale Law School; and a Visiting Lecturer on English at Harvard University.

In 2020, Betts founded Freedom Reads with a $5.25 million grant from the Mellon Foundation. Freedom Reads is a non-profit organization that aims to expand educational experiences for people in prison, including building "Freedom Libraries" in every cellblock in America. Betts serves as the organization's director.

== Awards and fellowships ==
- 2009: Beatrice Hawley Award for Shahid Reads His Own Palm.
- 2010: Open Society Foundation fellowship.
- 2010: NAACP Image Award for Outstanding Literary Work – Debut Author for A Question of Freedom: A Memoir of Learning, Survival, and Coming of Age in Prison
- 2017: Israel H. Peres Prize for best student comment ("Only Once I Thought About Suicide") appearing in the Yale Law Journal.
- 2018: PEN America's Writing for Justice Fellowship.
- 2018: Guggenheim Foundation Fellowship.
- 2021: MacArthur Fellowship.

== Publications ==
=== Poetry ===
==== Collections ====
- Betts, Reginald Dwayne (2010). Near Burn and Burden: a collection of poems. Warren Wilson College.
- — (2010). Shahid Reads His Own Palm. Alice James Books. ISBN 9781882295814.
- — (2015). Bastards of the Reagan Era. Stahlecker Selections. ISBN 9781935536659.
- — (2019). Felon: Poems. W.W. Norton. ISBN 9780393652147.
- —; Kaphar, Titus (2023). Redaction. W.W. Norton. ISBN 9781324006824.
- — (2025). Doggerel: Poems. W.W. Norton. ISBN 9781324089254.

==== Literary journals and magazines ====
His poems have been published in literary journals and magazines including Ploughshares, Crab Orchard Review, and Poet Lore.

==== List of select poems ====
Title	Year	First published	Reprinted/collected
What we know of horses	2011	Betts, Reginald Dwayne (2011). "What we know of horses" (PDF). River Styx. 85: 37–38.	Henderson, Bill, ed. (2013). The Pushcart Prize XXXVII: Best of the small presses 2013. Pushcart Press. pp. 471–473.
A conversation	2006	Betts, Reginald Dwayne (Spring 2006). "A Conversation". Beltway Poetry Quarterly. 7 (2).	
let me tell you bout the night i died	2008	Betts, Reginald Dwayne (2008). "let me tell you bout the night i died". The Drunken Boat. 8 (III–IV).	
Misunderstood	2008	Betts, Reginald Dwayne (2008). "Misunderstood". The Drunken Boat. 8 (III–IV).	
Soldier's song	2008	Betts, Reginald Dwayne (2008). "Soldier's song". The Drunken Boat. 8 (III–IV).	

=== Non-fiction ===
- A Question of Freedom: A memoir of learning, survival, and coming of age in prison. Penguin. 2010. ISBN 9781101133361.
- Betts, Reginald Dwayne (2016). "Only Once I Thought About Suicide". Yale Law Journal Forum. 125: 222.
