= Selling Apartheid =

Book by Ron Nixon

Selling Apartheid: South Africa's Global Propaganda War
- Author: Ron Nixon
- Language: English
- Subject: Apartheid
- Publisher: Jacana Media
- Publication date: 2015
- Pages: 256
- ISBN: 9780745399140
- Dewey Decimal: 305.800968

Selling Apartheid: South Africa's Global Propaganda War is a 2015 book by Ron Nixon, the Washington correspondent for the New York Times and a visiting associate in the Department of Media and Journalism Studies at the University of Witwatersrand.

== Background and synopsis ==
Selling Apartheid is an in-depth investigation into the Foreign relations of South Africa during apartheid and the international propaganda campaign conducted by the apartheid government. Nixon's book contains a large number of previously secret records from archives in South Africa, the United Kingdom and the United States. It examines the diverse network of apartheid supporters and defenders from global corporations with business operations in South Africa to conservative religious organisations, and even anti-communist black conservatives aligned with right-wing Cold War politicians.

The book recalls a moment during Nixon's youth in which he was unwittingly given a propaganda magazine produced by South African intelligence services from his grandmother which painted a glowing picture filled with wild animals, sunsets and happy black people on the beach.

== Reception ==
In the Star Tribune Chris Serres wrote that Selling Apartheid "meticulously unpacks the complex web of relationships and covert money flows"

Ron Jacobs, writing for the Sri Lanka Guardian praised the book as an "essential addition to the volume of work on South Africa's apartheid regime" which is "rich in detail".
