= Executive Order 14190 =

2025 executive order by President Donald Trump

- "Ending Radical Indoctrination in K-12 Schooling"
- Front page of Executive Order 14190
- Type: Executive order
- Number: 14190
- President: Donald Trump
- Signed: January 29, 2025

Federal Register details
- Federal Register document number: 2025-02232
- Publication date: January 29, 2025

Executive Order 14190, titled "Ending Radical Indoctrination in K-12 Schooling" is an executive order signed on January 29, 2025 by President Donald Trump, nine days into his second term. It prohibits K–12 (kindergarten to twelfth grade) schools from teaching any material considered anti-American or subversive, as well as anything promoting "gender ideology" or critical race theory.

== Provisions ==
Under the order, law enforcement are directed to conduct investigations of educational or education-related institutions suspected of involvement in the "instruction, advancement, or promotion of gender ideology or discriminatory equity ideology," declaring such ideas to be anti-American and subversive. The order further directs law enforcement to criminally prosecute any teacher who "unlawfully facilitates" the social transition of a transgender minor. Listed examples of unlawful facilitation include psychiatric counseling by a school counselor, referring to the student using their preferred name and/or pronouns, referring to a student as "nonbinary", and allowing the student to use segregated facilities or participate on segregated sports teams differing from those of their assigned sex. The order directs that educators in violation of this law be prosecuted as having committed sexual exploitation of a minor, and/or practicing medicine without a license. Additionally, schools found in violation would have their federal funding revoked.

The order also reinstated the 1776 Commission originally created under Trump's first term.

== Implementation ==
=== Public Broadcasting Service ===
A division of PBS, PBS Learning Media, removed all educational resources developed for teachers on LGBTQ+ topics, such as coverage of the Stonewall riots. PBS also closed its DEI office.

== See also ==
- 2020s anti-LGBTQ movement in the United States
- Persecution of transgender people under the second Trump administration
- Executive Order 14168 ("Defending Women from Gender Ideology Extremism and Restoring Biological Truth to the Federal Government")
- Executive Order 14151 ("Ending Radical and Wasteful Government DEI Programs and Preferencing")
- Executive Order 14183 ("Prioritizing Military Excellence and Readiness")
