= Jeneen Interlandi =

US journalist on the editorial board of the New York Times

- Born: 1977 (age 48–49); Medellín, Colombia
- Education: Rutgers University (BS); Columbia University (MA, MS)
- Occupation: Journalist
- Known for: Health and science

Jeneen Interlandi (born 1977) is a staff writer at the New York Times magazine and a member of The New York Times editorial board.

Interlandi was born in Medellín, Colombia, adopted by Sicilian-Americans, and raised in Central New Jersey. After a bachelor's degree in biology at Rutgers University, Interlandi earned a M.A. in environmental science and M.S. in journalism at Columbia University. She was a 2013 Harvard University Nieman Fellow. She has written about health, science, and education since 2006. Before joining the Times, she was a staff writer at Consumer Reports and Newsweek, and a freelance journalist for several national magazines. She participated in The 1619 Project, with an essay highlighting the work of Rebecca Lee Crumpler.
