= Campaign for Youth Justice =

U.S. nonprofit organization

- Abbreviation: CFYJ
- Formation: July 1, 2005; 21 years ago
- Type: Advocacy group
- Legal status: Nonprofit
- Purpose: Juvenile justice reform
- Headquarters: Washington, D.C.
- Region served: United States
- President/CEO: Marcy Mistrett
- Website: campaignforyouthjustice.org

The Campaign for Youth Justice (CFYJ) is a national campaign in the United States dedicated to ending the practice of trying, sentencing, and incarcerating children under age 18 in the adult justice system. Founded in 2005, CFYJ has become a national clearinghouse on the issue of trying youth in adult court. It is also one of the leading advocates for the reauthorization of the Juvenile Justice and Delinquency Prevention Act. CFYJ is an advocacy group with nonprofit status.

== Mission ==
The mission of the Campaign for Youth Justice is to end the practice of prosecuting, sentencing and incarcerating youth (under 18) in the adult criminal justice system. CFYJ also seeks to promote research-based, developmentally appropriate rehabilitative programs and services for youth as an alternative to the adult criminal justice system.

== Organization ==
The Campaign for Youth Justice was founded in 2005 by current President and CEO Liz Ryan to reform the juvenile justice system. CFYJ has an office in Washington, D.C., and also works with many state-based campaigns.

== National efforts ==
=== Act 4 Juvenile Justice Campaign ===
CFYJ and its allies launched the Act 4 Juvenile Justice campaign to reauthorize the Juvenile Justice and Delinquency Prevention Act and ensure adequate funding for the states to implement the act.

=== Alliance for Youth Justice ===
In July, 2009, CFYJ initiated the Alliance for Youth Justice (AYJ) to provide a space in which formerly incarcerated youth, their parents and families, and other allies can come together for support, information and to share ideas. The AYJ has become a clearinghouse of information for parents needing specific information and support for their individual needs as well as linking them to a larger movement focused on making change in their communities, their states and on the national level. Individuals from more than 40 states have participated to date.

== Original research and reports ==
CFYJ has sponsored, conducted and released numerous reports and studies illustrating what it believes to be are the problems with prosecuting youth as adults. In April, 2011, CFYJ released State Trends: Legislative Changes from 2005 to 2010 Removing Youth from the Adult Criminal Justice System, which provides state policymakers, the media, the public, and advocates with the latest information about youth in the adult justice system. The first half of the report explains the dangers to youth, public safety, and the overall prosperity of our economy and future generations. The second half of the report examines 27 positive pieces of legislation enacted in 15 states during the last five years, as well as highlights active reform efforts underway in four categories:

•Trend 1: Eleven States (Maine, Virginia, Pennsylvania, Colorado, Hawaii, Idaho, Indiana, Nevada, Texas, Ohio, Oregon) have passed laws limiting the ability to house youth in adult jails and prisons.

•Trend 2: Four states (Connecticut, Illinois, Mississippi, Massachusetts) have expanded their juvenile court jurisdiction so that older youth who previously would be automatically tried as adults are not prosecuted in adult criminal court.

•Trend 3: Eleven states (Arizona, Colorado, Connecticut Delaware, Illinois, Maryland, Nevada, Ohio, Utah, Virginia, Washington) have changed their transfer laws making it more likely that youth will stay in the juvenile justice system.

•Trend 4: Eight states (California, Colorado, Georgia, Indiana, Missouri, Ohio, Texas, Washington) have changed their mandatory minimum sentencing laws to take into account the developmental differences between youth and adults.
