= Trymaine Lee =

American journalist

- Born: September 20, 1978 (age 48); United States
- Education: Camden County College (AA); Rowan University (BA)
- Occupation: Journalist
- Employer(s): NBCUniversal, Comcast
- Television: MSNBC Live
- Awards: Pulitzer Prize for Breaking News Reporting (2006)
- Website: trymaineleeauthor.com

Trymaine D. Lee (born September 20, 1978) is an American journalist. He shared a Pulitzer Prize for breaking news coverage of Hurricane Katrina as part of a team at The Times-Picayune of New Orleans. From 2006 to 2010, Lee wrote for The New York Times, where he won a second Pulitzer Prize for coverage of the Eliot Spitzer prostitution scandal. From early 2011 to November 2012 he was a senior reporter at The Huffington Post. Since then, Lee has been a national reporter for MSNBC, where he writes for the network's digital arm and hosts the podcast Into America.

== Background ==
Lee was raised in Chesilhurst, New Jersey. As a child, he showed an early interest in writing and athletics while attending Milton Hershey School in Hershey, Pennsylvania. After obtaining an associate degree in communications studies at Camden County College, he earned a Bachelor of Arts in Journalism from Rowan University in Glassboro, New Jersey. While at Rowan, he wrote for the school newspaper The Whit and was involved with the NAACP.

== Career ==
Lee began his career reporting on police and crime at the Philadelphia Tribune and the Trentonian of Trenton, New Jersey. Outside of his work as a daily reporter, his work has also appeared in the magazines Ebony, Essence, Real Health and The Crisis.

=== Times-Picayune and Hurricane Katrina ===
As a reporter for The Times-Picayune, Lee covered Hurricane Katrina as it happened. He had arrived in New Orleans only four months before. Hurricane Katrina made landfall in Louisiana on August 29, 2005. Lee says that he was given the opportunity to evacuate on August 29 by another editor, but chose to stay and cover the story. His article "Nightmare in the 9th Ward all too real for one woman" was published on September 1, 2005—exclusively online because the newspaper could not be printed.

=== The New York Times ===
From 2006 to 2010, Lee was a staff reporter for The New York Times, where he primarily covered Harlem. During this period, Lee also reported from Albany and Brooklyn and contributed to a series of videos called "New York On Less".

=== The Huffington Post ===
In March 2011, Lee was hired to cover "national issues that impact the black community" for Huffington Post's Black Voices. The move was a consequence of AOL's acquisition and expansion of Huffington.

==== Reporting on Trayvon Martin ====
Trayvon Martin, a 17-year-old African American man, was fatally shot on February 26, 2012. Lee did not learn of Martin 's death until more than a week afterward, but he was one of the first national reporters to cover the story, for Huffington Post's Black Voices on March 8, 2012. He continued filing stories on the case nearly every day that month. He believes that his "early coverage definitely helped light the fire ... Before we pushed the story, few if any major national news outlets were covering it." Lee appeared on Countdown with Keith Olbermann to discuss the story multiple times.

==== MSNBC ====
In November 2012, Lee joined MSNBC as a national reporter for its digital unit, reporting on social justice issues and the impact of politics and policy on everyday people. Lee described his move to MSNBC as a chance to "flex different muscles" as a journalist.

In February 2020, Lee began hosting the MSNBC podcast Into America.

The Root

In 2026, Lee began hosting the docuseries America Amended for The Root, reflecting on constitutional rights provided by the amendments to the U.S. Constitution and the gaps in rights that remain despite the amendments, with each episode being centered around how one amendment still affects one American city: such as the impact of the Second Amendment and gun ownership on the black population in Atlanta, and how slavery is still legal for those convicted of crimes despite the Thirteenth Amendment in Milwaukee.

== Awards ==
=== Pulitzer Prizes ===
"Nightmare in the 9th Ward all too real for one woman" was one of the ten stories cited when The Times-Picayune staff won the Pulitzer Prize for Breaking News Reporting in 2006. Lee shared the award with three other reporters, Doug MacCash, Manuel Torres, and Mark Schleifstein. The award marked the first time a Pulitzer was awarded for online journalism.

Lee also contributed to coverage of the Eliot Spitzer prostitution scandal by The New York Times, which won the Pulitzer Prize for Breaking News in 2009.

=== Other awards ===
In 2006, Lee was named Emerging Journalist of the Year (one of three) by the National Association of Black Journalists. The New York chapter of the association gave him the Griot award in 2011. In April 2012, Lee won the April Sidney Award from the Sidney Hillman Foundation for his coverage of the Trayvon Martin case. His alma maters Rowan University and Camden County College have both recognized him as outstanding among their alumni. In 2021, Lee won "Podcast Host of the Year" at the Adweek Podcast Awards.
