= Jamelle Bouie =

American columnist and political correspondent (born 1987)

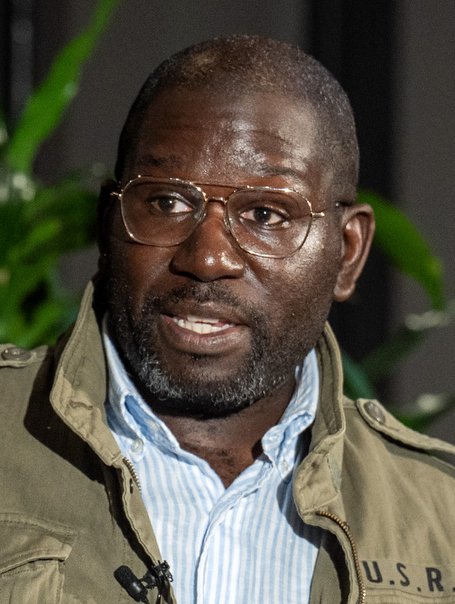
- Bouie in 2026
- Born: Jamelle Antoine Bouie; 1987 (age 38–39); Virginia Beach, Virginia, U.S.
- Education: University of Virginia (BA)
- Occupations: Journalist; columnist; writer
- Years active: 2010–present
- Employer: The Daily Beast (2013–2014); Slate (2014–2019); The New York Times (2019–present)
- Website: jamellebouie.net

Jamelle Antoine Bouie (/dʒəˈmɛl ˈbuː.iː/; born 1987) is an American columnist for The New York Times. He was formerly chief political correspondent for Slate.

== Early and personal life ==
Bouie was born and raised in Virginia Beach, Virginia. He graduated from Floyd E. Kellam High School in 2005. In 2009, he graduated from the University of Virginia with a Bachelor of Arts degree, with majors in political and social thought and government. While there, he began blogging, which led to interest in a career in journalism. Bouie previously lived and worked in Washington, D.C.; as of 2021, he is based in Charlottesville, Virginia.

== Career ==
Bouie was awarded a writing fellowship for The American Prospect in 2010. He was awarded a Knobler Fellowship at the Nation Institute by The Nation in 2012. Bouie became a staff writer for The Daily Beast in 2013, writing about national politics. In 2014, he moved to Slate as a chief political correspondent, covering politics, policy, and race. He joined The New York Times as a columnist in 2019.

Bouie was a contributor to Barack Obama and the New America: The 2012 Election and the Changing Face of Politics, a 2013 book edited by political scientist Larry Sabato. Bouie has been a political analyst on CBS News since 2015. He frequently appears on Face the Nation, the network's Sunday morning show, and contributed to the network's 2016 election night coverage. Bouie writes articles focusing on history, public policy, and national politics. He also writes about entertainment, such as science fiction, comics, and film. He has reviewed breakfast cereal for Serious Eats.

Bouie has written extensively on racial politics, including slavery in the United States and the American Civil War, the killing of Trayvon Martin, the Ferguson unrest, the Charleston church shooting, and the Black Lives Matter movement. His writing on racial and national politics is often quoted by other journalists. Shortly after Donald Trump was elected president in 2016, Bouie wrote an article for Slate arguing that there was "no such thing as a good Trump voter". Several days earlier, he compared Trump voters to the "angry, recalcitrant whites" who resisted the Reconstruction era after the American Civil War. He has criticized the media for an unwillingness to label racism in the United States as "racist", opting instead for terms such as "racial" and "racially charged". He also criticized the media for its "horse-race" coverage of the 2016 presidential election. He called the NPR interview between Noel King and Jason Kessler "journalistic malpractice".

In 2019, The New York Times announced that Bouie would join its lineup of opinion columnists.

Bouie is an accomplished photographer. His first public photography exhibition, in 2019, focused on towns in Oklahoma founded in the 19th century by former slaves. With John Ganz, he hosts the Unclear and Present Danger podcast exploring political thriller films of the 1990s and what they say about the United States' perception of the world in that era. He also has an active presence on TikTok, which Slate noted as unusual for an opinion journalist working in legacy media.

== Recognition ==
In 2012, Bouie was chosen for The Root's Root Top 100. The site wrote, "his is a strong, influential and necessary voice during the 2012 election season and beyond". Forbes recognized Bouie in its "30 Under 30 – Media" list in 2015, writing, "he became a leading voice on the Ferguson story". He received the American Political Science Association's 2025 Carey McWilliams Award, which honors "a major journalistic contribution to our understanding of politics". In 2019, in the Columbia Journalism Review, David Uberti called Bouie "one of the defining commentators on politics and race in the Trump era."
