= Jake Silverstein =

American writer and magazine editor (born 1975)

- Born: 1975 (age 49–50); California, U.S.
- Education: Wesleyan University; Hollins University; University of Texas at Austin
- Occupation: Magazine editor
- Employer: The New York Times Magazine
- Spouse: Mary LaMotte Silverstein
- Children: 2

Jake Silverstein (born 1975) is an American writer and magazine editor. He is the editor-in-chief of The New York Times Magazine and the author of Nothing Happened and Then It Did, a novelized memoir.

== Early life and education ==
Silverstein was raised in Oakland, California, in a Jewish family, the eldest of two children. His mother was a psychoanalyst and his father an architect. He attended Wesleyan University where he majored in English, and later earned an M.A. in English from Hollins University and then an M.F.A. from the University of Texas at Austin's Michener Center for Writers in 2006. He was a Fulbright scholar in Zacatecas, Mexico, in 2002.

== Career ==
After graduating from college, Silverstein interned at Harper's in 1998, continued at the magazine for a year as a fact-checker, then moved to The Big Bend Sentinel in Marfa, Texas in 1999.

Silverstein was the editor of Texas Monthly from 2008 to 2014, during which time the magazine won four National Magazine Awards in 12 nominations. Under his tenure, the magazine had a circulation of approximately 300,000 and rising revenue, in contrast to many similar publications in the same period. He became the editor of The New York Times Magazine in May 2014, since which time the magazine has won 14 National Magazine Awards. The Magazine has also won 7 Pulitzer Prizes, in Feature Writing (2015, 2024), Commentary (2020), Criticism (2021), International Reporting (2022), Illustrated Reporting and Commentary (2023), and Public Interest (2024).

He is the author of the hybrid memoir-novel Nothing Happened and Then It Did, which he wrote during his M.F.A. program and published in 2010 with W.W. Norton & Company.

=== 1619 Project ===
As editor-in-chief of the New York Times Magazine, Silverstein has played a role in the 1619 Project, a view of the role of slavery in the history of the United States. Some historians argue the project contains factual inaccuracies and distortions in attributing slavery a central role in the American Revolution. Silverstein has disputed those claims. The author's essay for the project won a Pulitzer Prize for Commentary in 2020, while the project itself has won many other honors. The 1619 Project book spent six months on the New York Times bestseller list.

== Personal life ==
He is married to archivist Mary LaMotte Silverstein, with whom he has two sons.
