= Washington D.C. Area Film Critics Association Awards 2023 =

22nd Washington D.C. Area Film Critics Association Awards

22nd WAFCA Awards
- Date: December 10, 2023

Highlights
- Best Film: American Fiction
- Best Director: Christopher Nolan – Oppenheimer
- Best Actor: Cillian Murphy – Oppenheimer
- Best Actress: Lily Gladstone – Killers of the Flower Moon

The 22nd Washington D.C. Area Film Critics Association Awards were announced on December 10, 2023. The nominations were announced on December 9, 2023. Oppenheimer led the nominations with eleven, followed by Barbie with ten. The former won the most awards with six, including Best Director and Best Actor.

== Winners and nominees ==
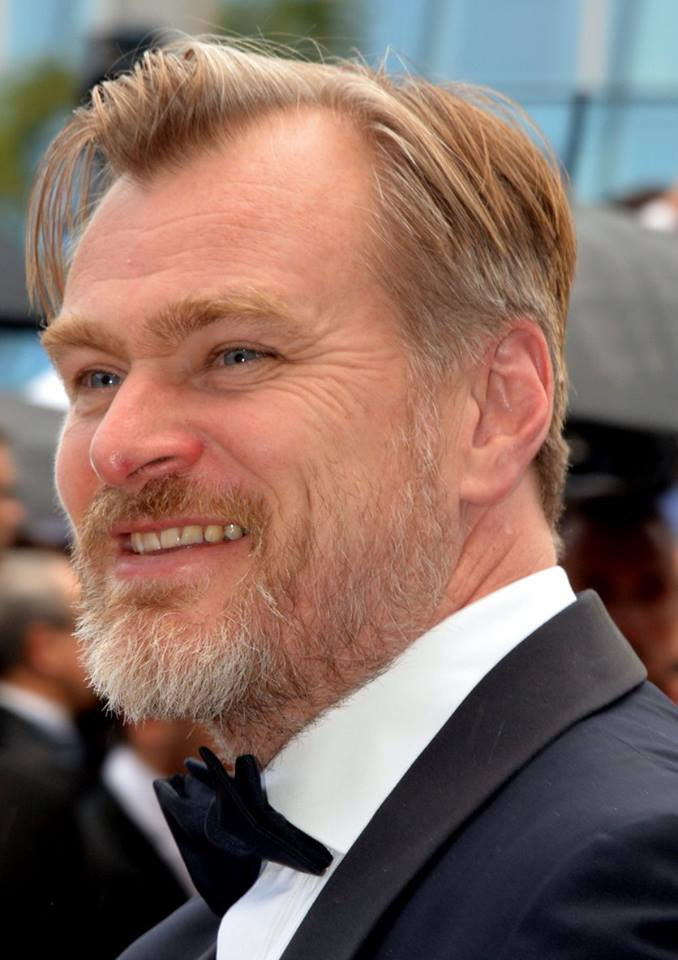
Christopher Nolan, Best Director winner

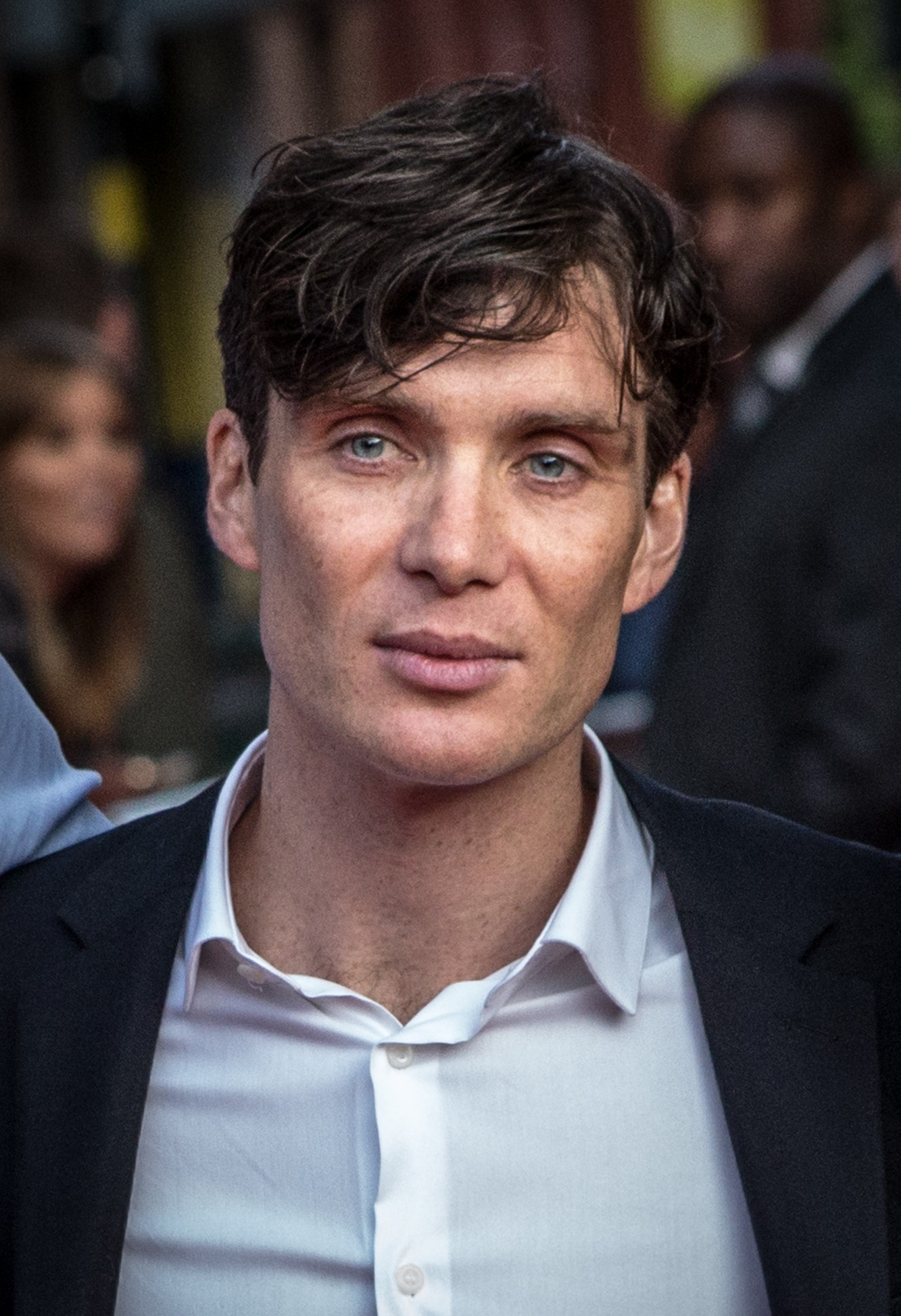
Cillian Murphy, Best Actor winner

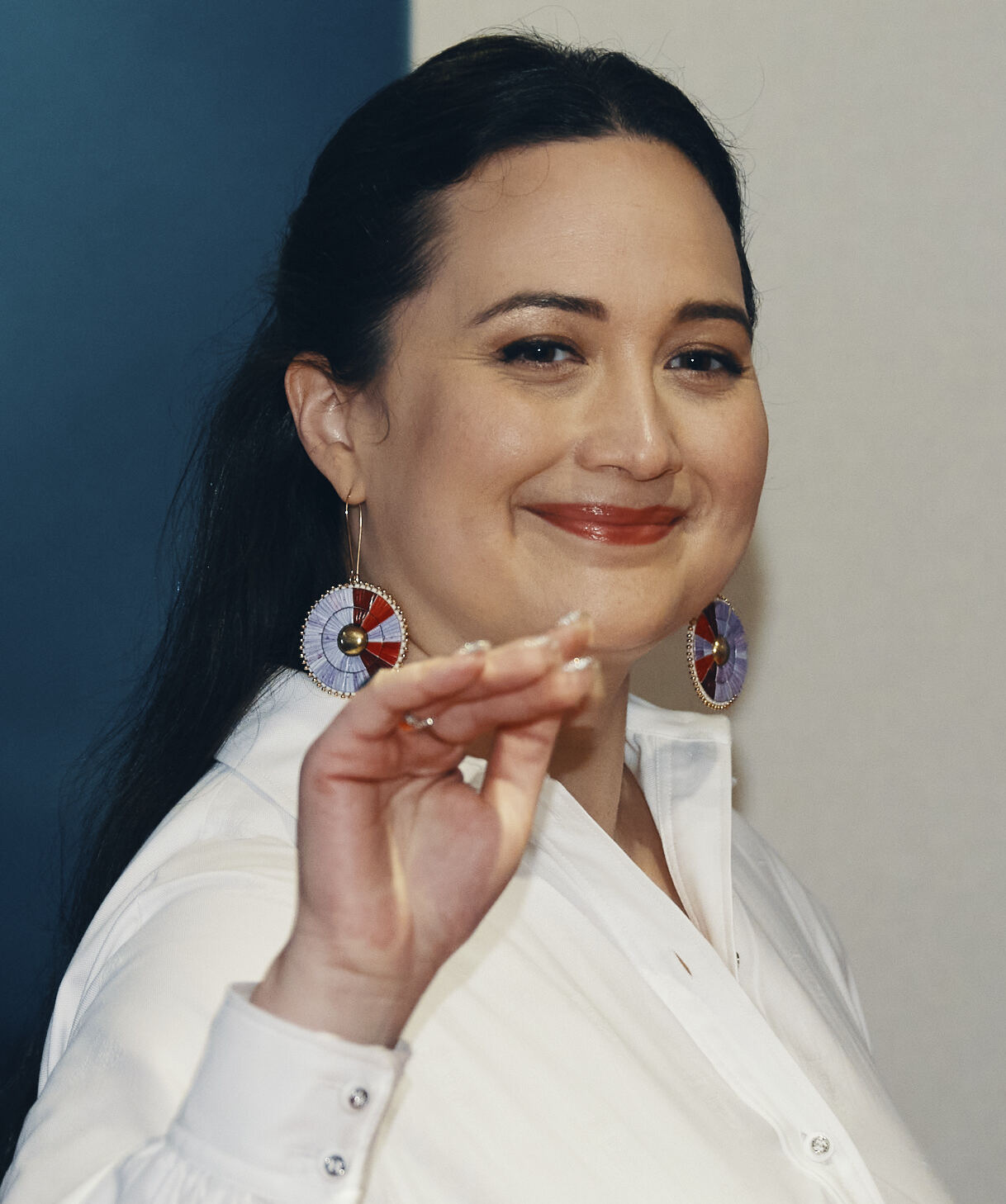
Lily Gladstone, Best Actress winner

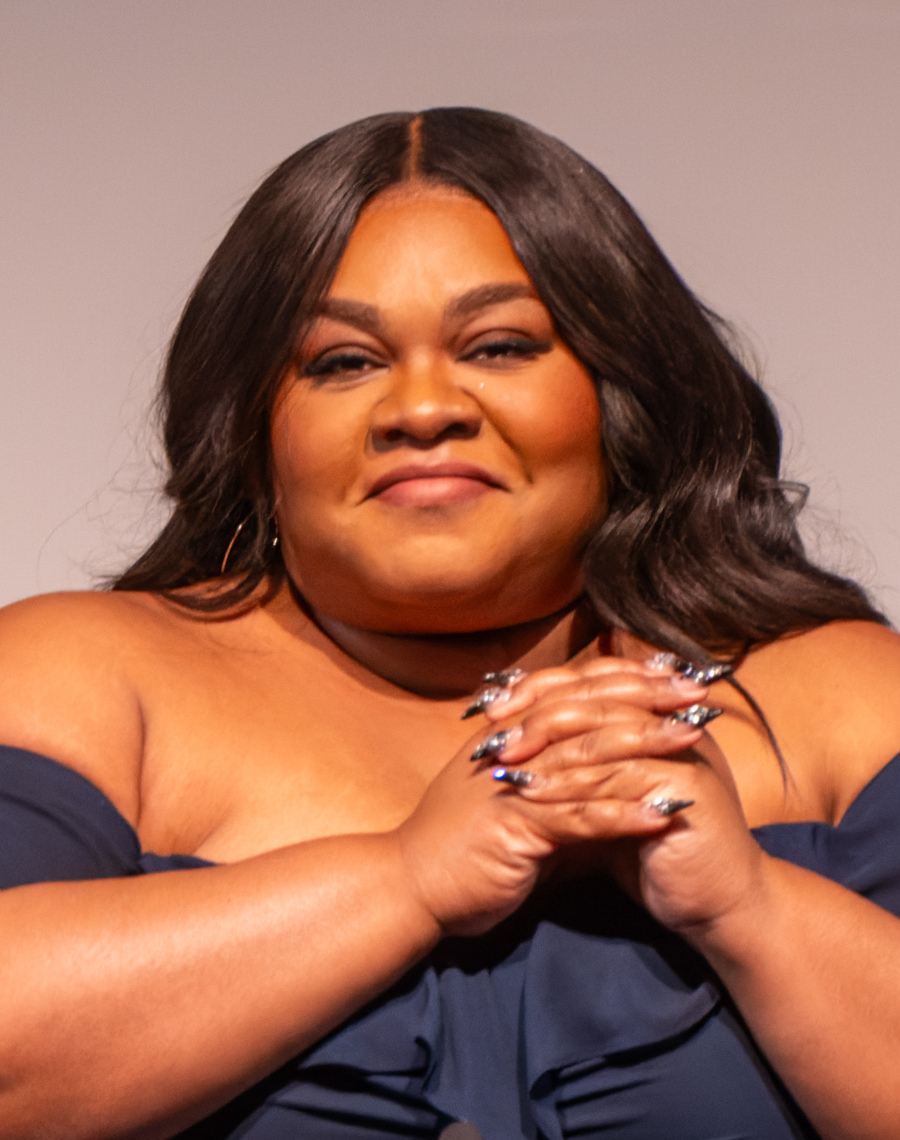
Da'Vine Joy Randolph, Best Supporting Actress winner

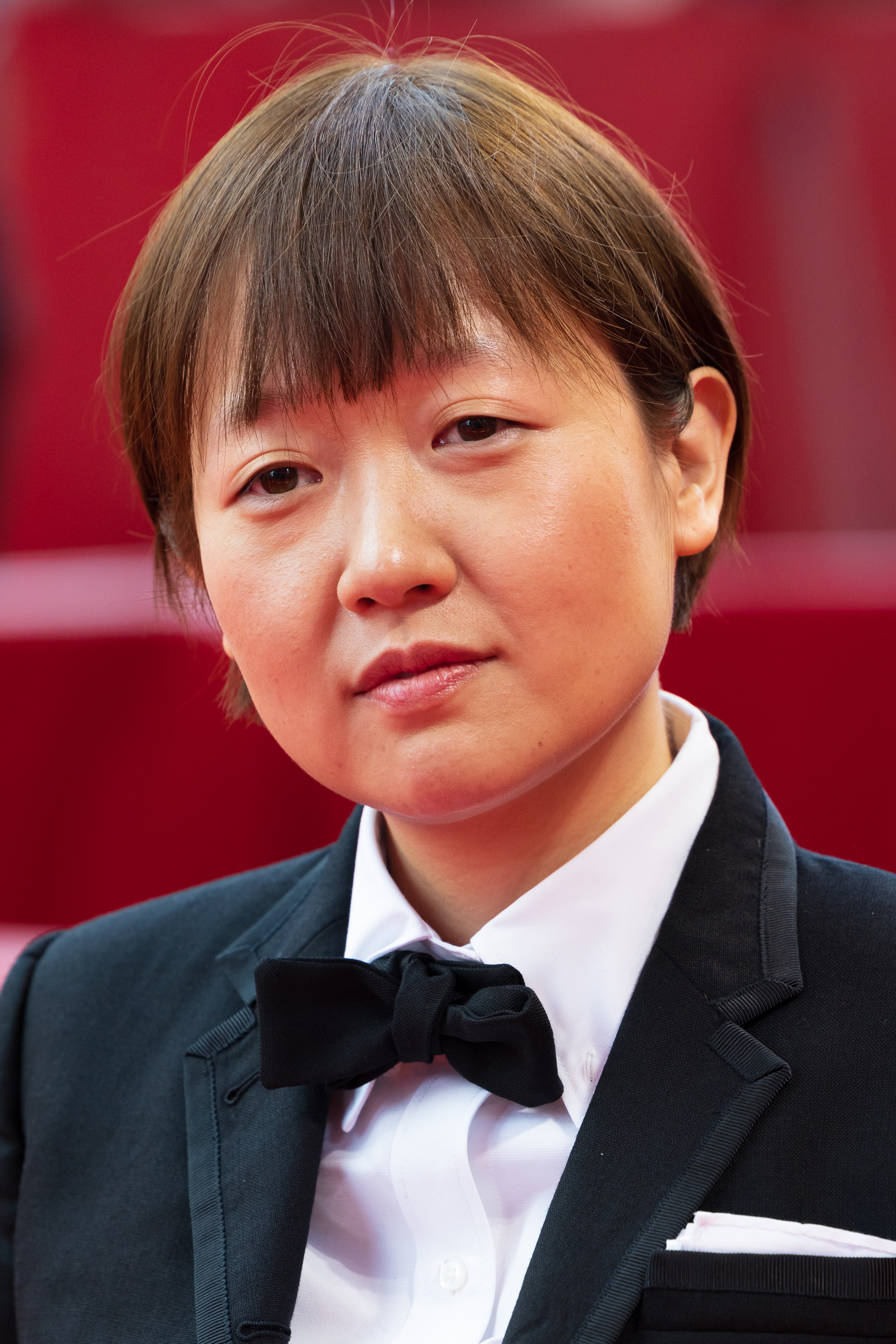
Celine Song, Best Original Screenplay winner

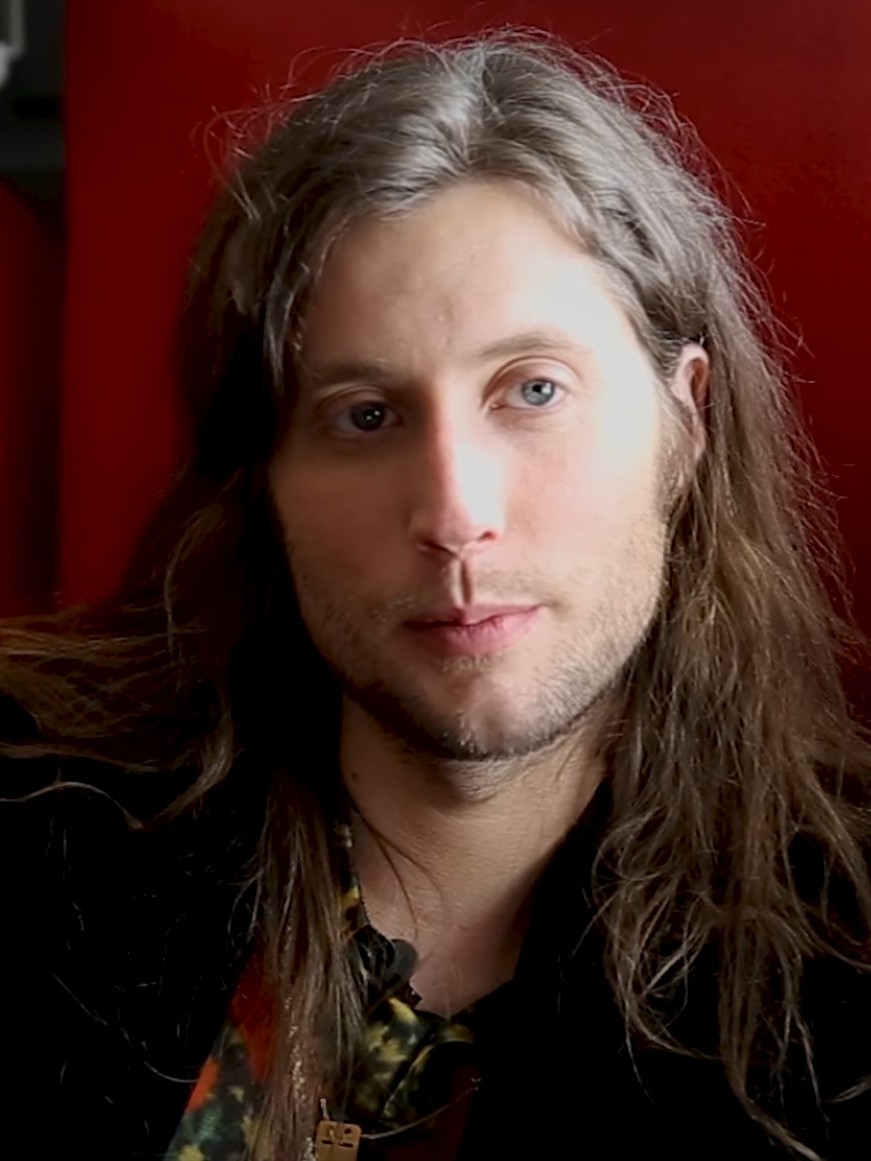
Ludwig Göransson, Best Original Score winner

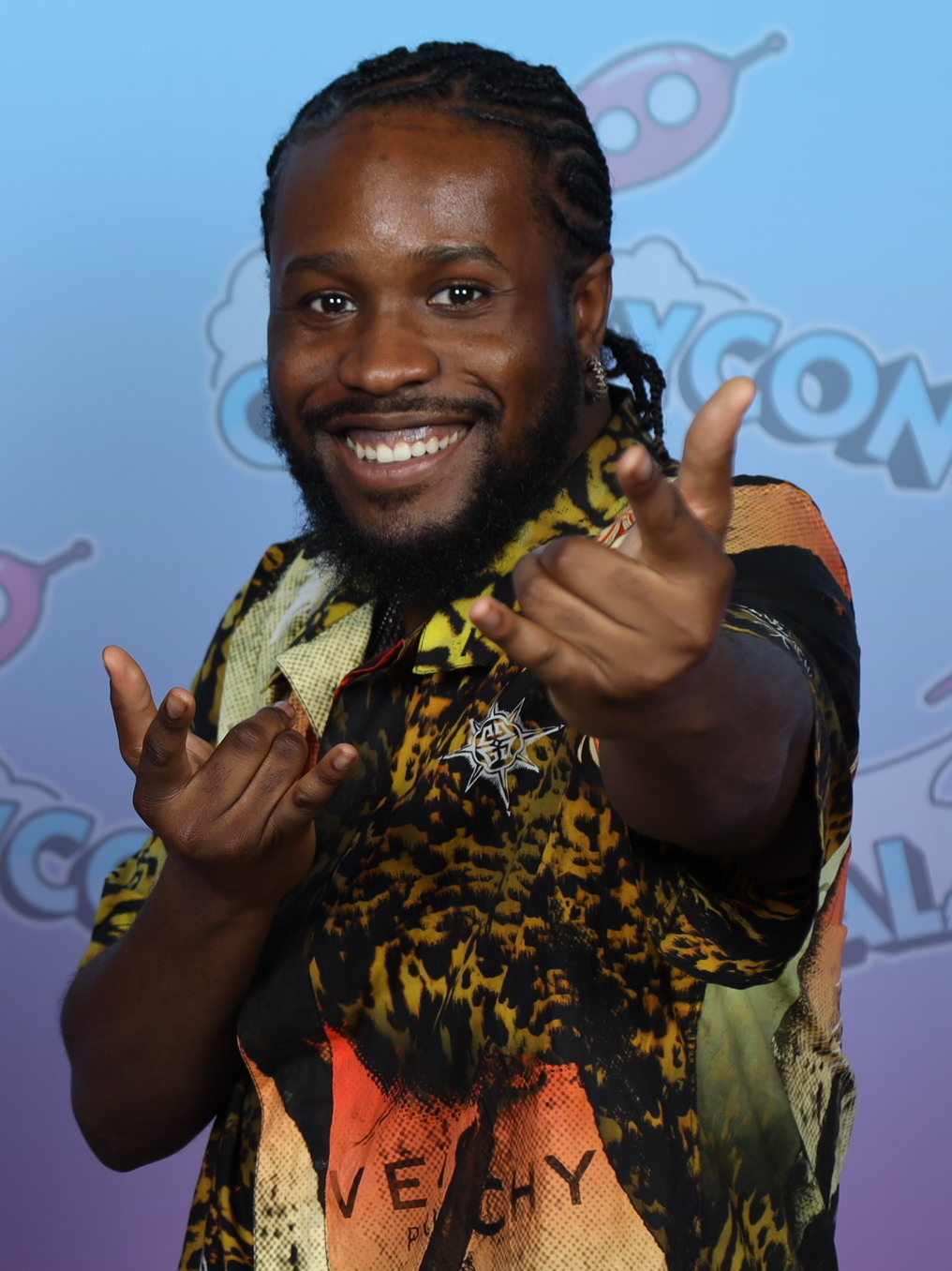
Shameik Moore, Best Voice Performance winner

The winners are listed first and in boldface.

Best Film	Best Director
**American Fiction**: Barbie; The Holdovers; Killers of the Flower Moon; Oppenheimer; Past Lives	**Christopher Nolan – Oppenheimer**: Greta Gerwig – Barbie; Yorgos Lanthimos – Poor Things; Martin Scorsese – Killers of the Flower Moon; Celine Song – Past Lives
Best Actor	Best Actress
**Cillian Murphy – Oppenheimer as J. Robert Oppenheimer**: Bradley Cooper – Maestro as Leonard Bernstein; Colman Domingo – Rustin as Bayard Rustin; Paul Giamatti – The Holdovers as Paul Hunham; Jeffrey Wright – American Fiction as Thelonious "Monk" Ellison	**Lily Gladstone – Killers of the Flower Moon as Mollie Burkhart**: Aunjanue Ellis-Taylor – Origin as Isabel Wilkerson; Greta Lee – Past Lives as Nora Moon; Margot Robbie – Barbie as Barbie; Emma Stone – Poor Things as Bella Baxter
Best Supporting Actor	Best Supporting Actress
**Charles Melton – May December as Joe Yoo**: Sterling K. Brown – American Fiction as Clifford "Cliff" Ellison; Robert Downey Jr. – Oppenheimer as Lewis Strauss; Ryan Gosling – Barbie as Ken; Dominic Sessa – The Holdovers as Angus Tully	**Da'Vine Joy Randolph – The Holdovers as Mary Lamb**: Emily Blunt – Oppenheimer as Kitty Oppenheimer; Danielle Brooks – The Color Purple as Sofia; Viola Davis – Air as Deloris Jordan; Jodie Foster – Nyad as Bonnie Stoll
Best Original Screenplay	Best Adapted Screenplay
**Past Lives – Celine Song**: Air – Alex Convery; Anatomy of a Fall – Justine Triet and Arthur Harari; Barbie – Greta Gerwig and Noah Baumbach; The Holdovers – David Hemingson	**American Fiction – Cord Jefferson**: Killers of the Flower Moon – Eric Roth and Martin Scorsese; Oppenheimer – Christopher Nolan; Origin – Ava DuVernay; Poor Things – Tony McNamara
Best Animated Feature	Best Documentary
**Spider-Man: Across the Spider-Verse**: The Boy and the Heron; Elemental; Nimona; Teenage Mutant Ninja Turtles: Mutant Mayhem	**American Symphony**: 20 Days in Mariupol; Little Richard: I Am Everything; Still: A Michael J. Fox Movie; They Shot the Piano Player
Best International/Foreign Language Film	Best Cinematography
**Anatomy of a Fall**: Fallen Leaves; Perfect Days; Society of the Snow; The Taste of Things; The Teachers' Lounge; The Zone of Interest	**Oppenheimer – Hoyte van Hoytema**: Barbie – Rodrigo Prieto; Killers of the Flower Moon – Rodrigo Prieto; Maestro – Matthew Libatique; Poor Things – Robbie Ryan
Best Editing	Best Original Score
**Oppenheimer – Jennifer Lame**: Barbie – Nick Houy; John Wick: Chapter 4 – Nathan Orloff; Killers of the Flower Moon – Thelma Schoonmaker; Maestro – Michelle Tesoro	**Oppenheimer – Ludwig Göransson**: The Color Purple – Kris Bowers; Killers of the Flower Moon – Robbie Robertson; Poor Things – Jerskin Fendrix; Spider-Man: Across the Spider-Verse – Daniel Pemberton
Best Production Design	Best Acting Ensemble
**Barbie – Sarah Greenwood (production designer); Katie Spencer (set decorator)**: Asteroid City – Adam Stockhausen (production designer); Kris Moran (set decorator); Killers of the Flower Moon – Jack Fisk (production designer); Adam Willis (set decorator); Oppenheimer – Ruth De Jong (production designer); Claire Kaufman (set decorator); Poor Things – Shona Heath and James Price (production designers); Zsuzsa Mihalek (set decorator)	**Oppenheimer**: American Fiction; Barbie; The Holdovers; Killers of the Flower Moon
Best Youth Performance	Best Voice Performance
**Dominic Sessa – The Holdovers as Angus Tully**: Joe Bird – Talk to Me as Riley; Abby Ryder Fortson – Are You There God? It’s Me, Margaret. as Margaret Simon; Milo Machado-Graner – Anatomy of a Fall as Daniel Maleski; Ariana Greenblatt – Barbie as Sasha; Iman Vellani – The Marvels as Kamala Khan / Ms. Marvel	**Shameik Moore – Spider-Man: Across the Spider-Verse as Miles Morales / Spider-Man**: Jack Black as Bowser – The Super Mario Bros. Movie; Daniel Kaluuya – Spider-Man: Across the Spider-Verse as Hobie Brown / Spider-Punk; Hailee Steinfeld – Spider-Man: Across the Spider-Verse as Gwen Stacy / Spider-Gwen; Masaki Suda – The Boy and the Heron as The Grey Heron

== Multiple nominations and wins ==
The following films received multiple nominations:

Nominations	Film
11	Oppenheimer
10	Barbie
9	Killers of the Flower Moon
7	The Holdovers
6	Poor Things
5	American Fiction
5	Spider-Man: Across the Spider-Verse
4	Past Lives
3	Anatomy of a Fall
3	Maestro
2	Air
2	The Boy and the Heron
2	The Color Purple
2	Origin

The following films received multiple awards:

Wins	Film
6	Oppenheimer
2	American Fiction
2	The Holdovers
2	Spider-Man: Across the Spider-Verse
