= San Francisco Bay Area Film Critics Circle Awards 2023 =

22nd San Francisco Bay Area Film Critics Circle Awards

22nd SFBAFCC Awards

January 9, 2024

Best Picture:
Oppenheimer

Best Animated Feature:
The Boy and the Heron

Best Documentary Feature:
20 Days in Mariupol

Best International Feature Film:
The Zone of Interest

The 22nd San Francisco Bay Area Film Critics Circle Awards, honoring the best in film for 2023, were given on January 9, 2024. The nominations were announced on January 5, 2024, with Oppenheimer leading the nominations with ten. The film also received the most awards with three wins, including Best Picture; The Zone of Interest also won three awards, including Best Director (Jonathan Glazer) and Best International Feature Film.

== Winners and nominees ==
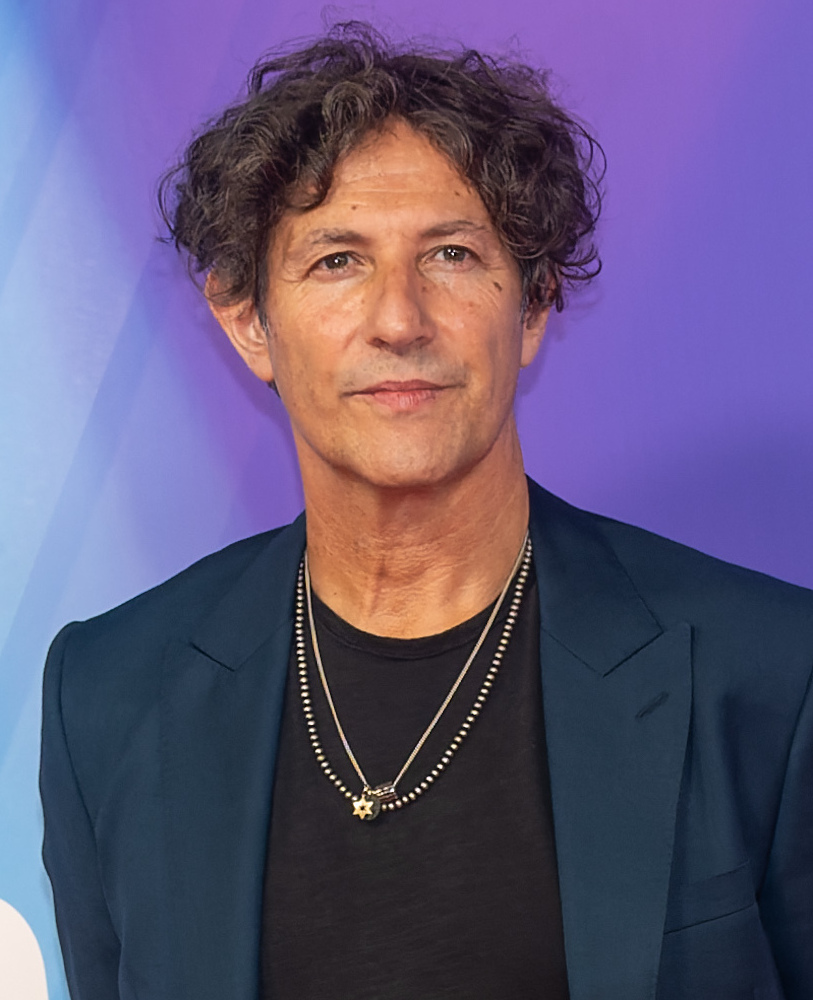
Jonathan Glazer, Best Director winner

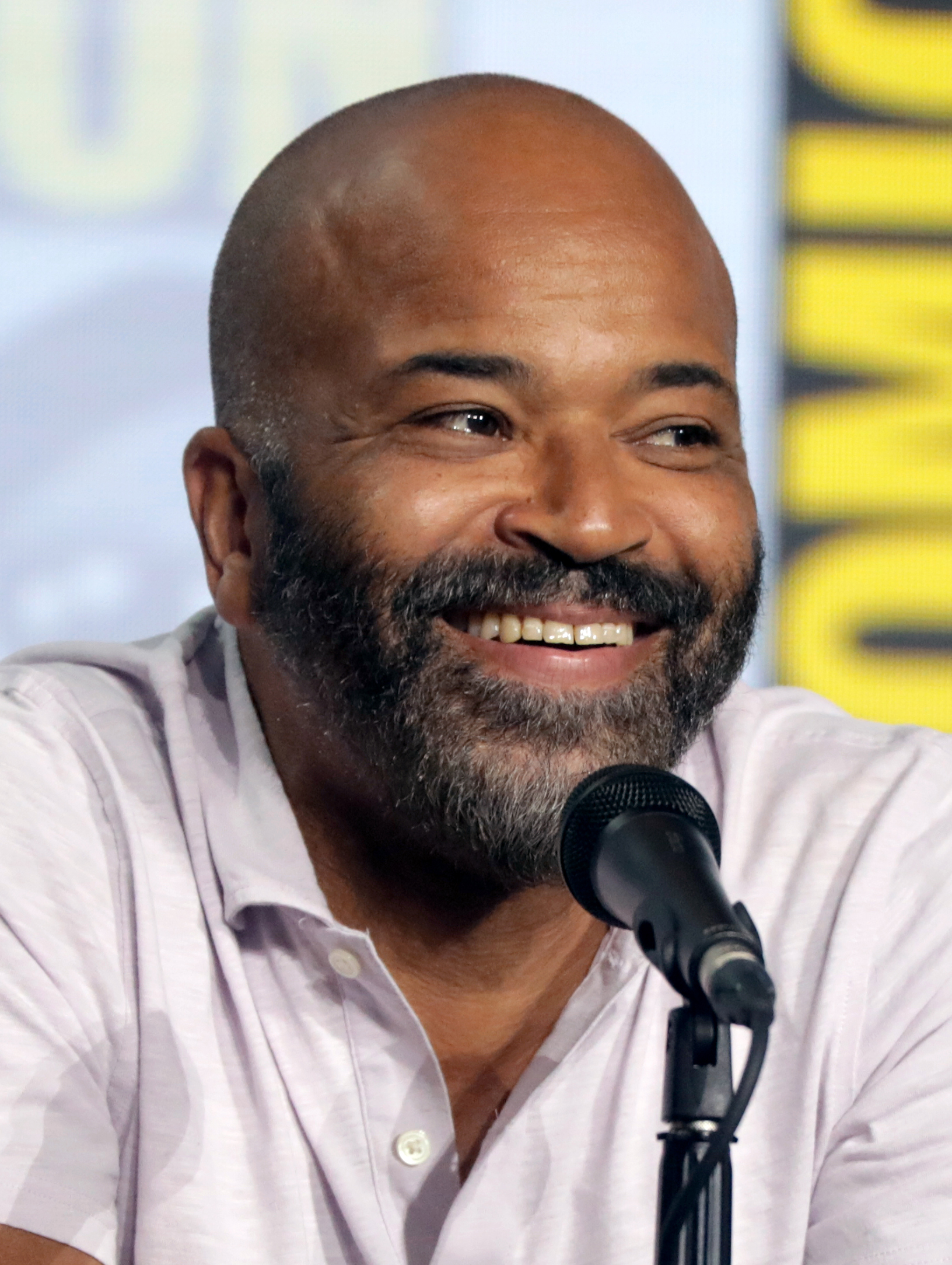
Jeffrey Wright, Best Actor winner

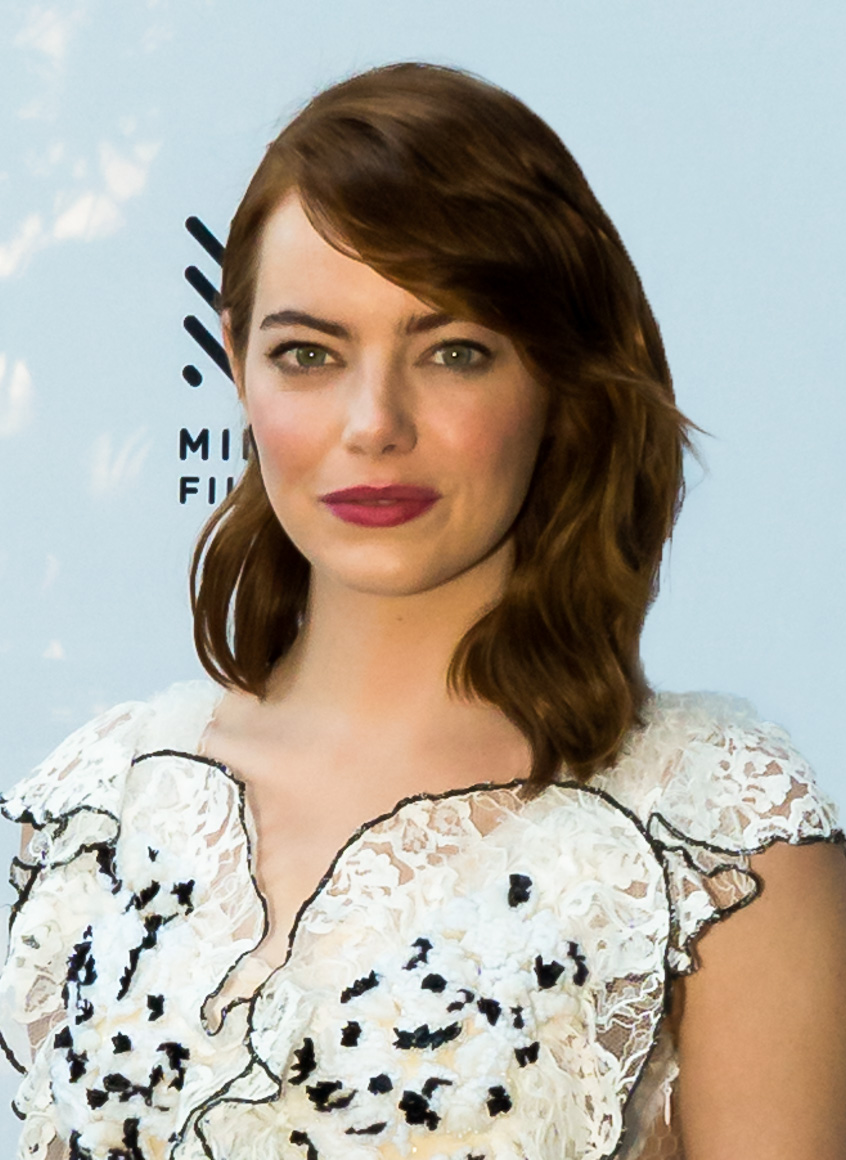
Emma Stone, Best Actress winner

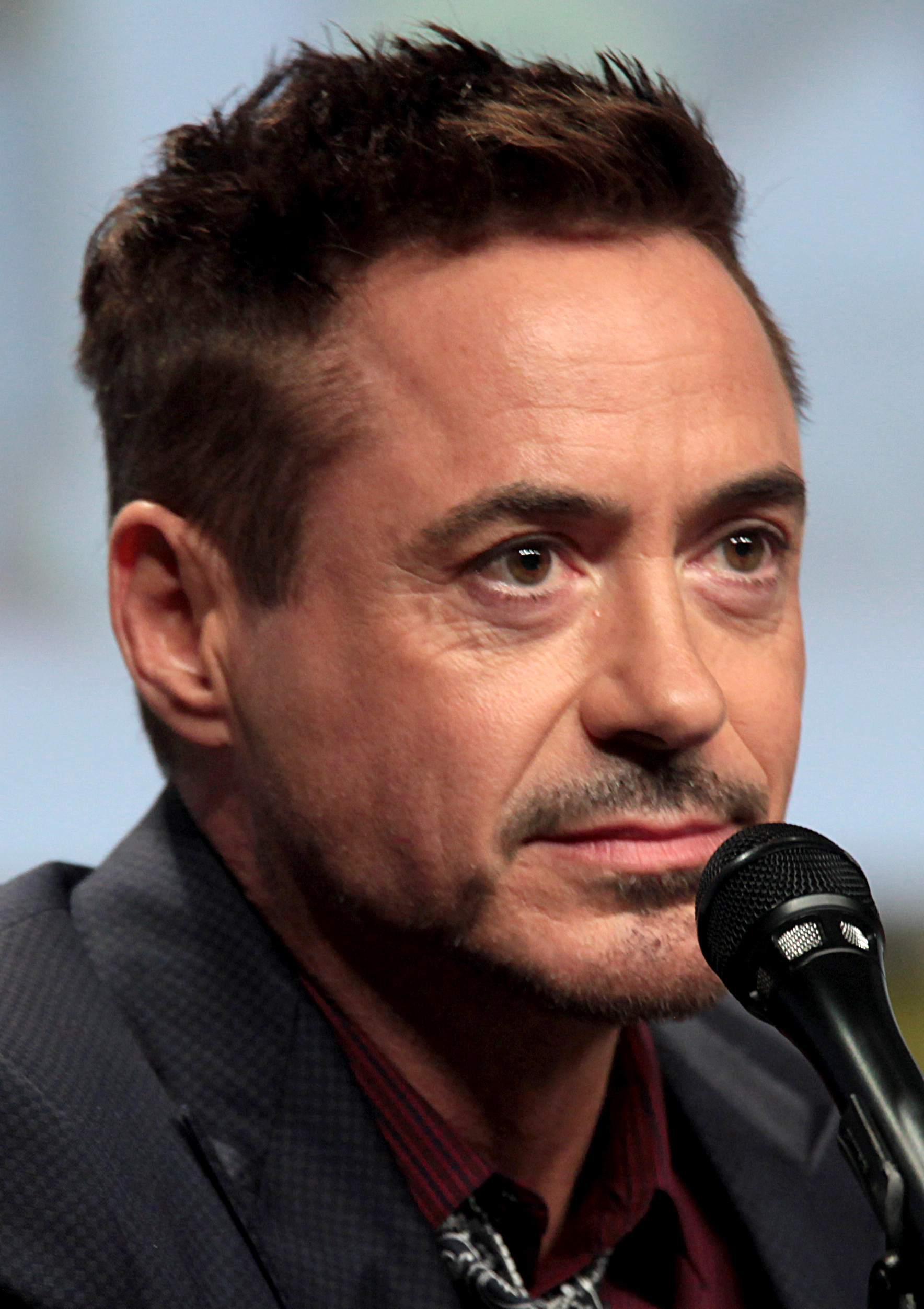
Robert Downey Jr., Best Supporting Actor winner

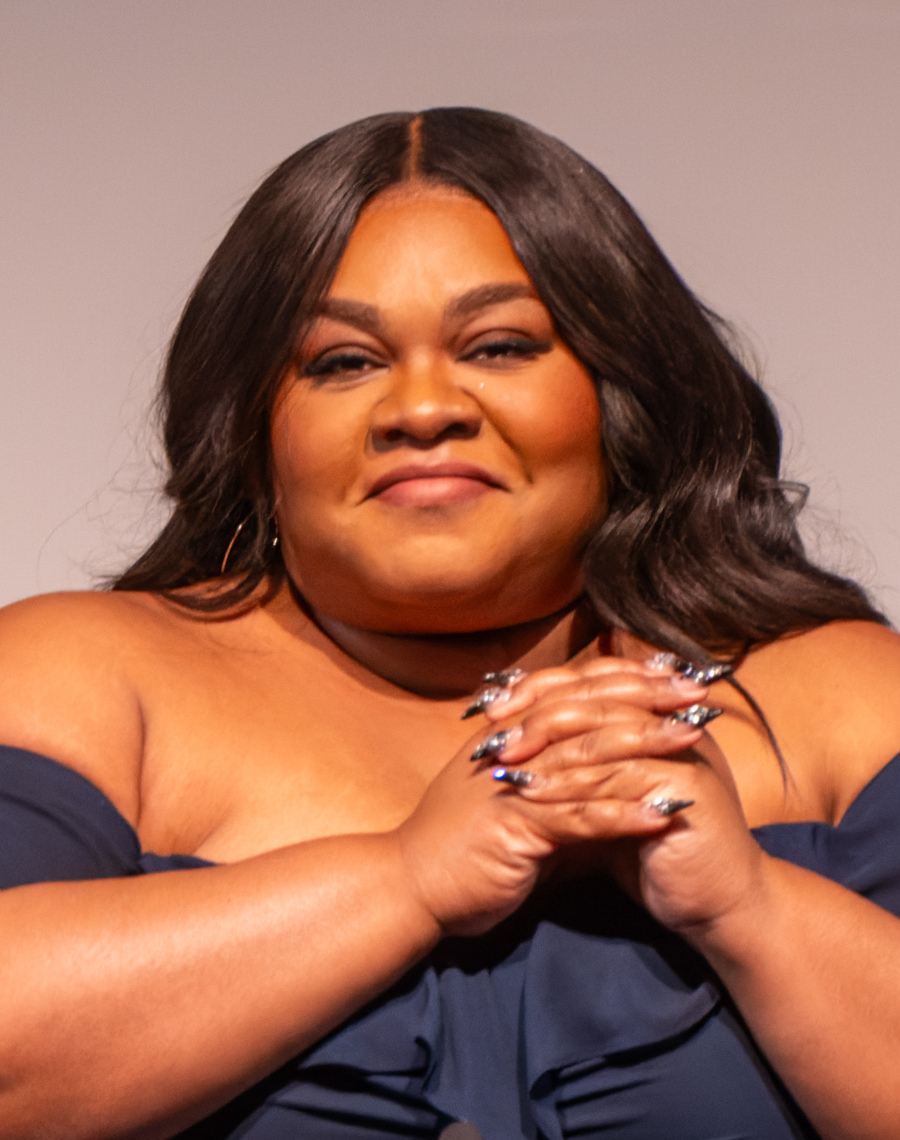
Da'Vine Joy Randolph, Best Supporting Actress winner

These are the nominees for the 22nd SFFCC Awards. Winners are listed at the top of each list:

Best Picture	Best Director
Oppenheimer; Killers of the Flower Moon; Past Lives; Poor Things; The Zone of Interest	Jonathan Glazer – The Zone of Interest; Greta Gerwig – Barbie; Christopher Nolan – Oppenheimer; Martin Scorsese – Killers of the Flower Moon; Celine Song – Past Lives
Best Actor	Best Actress
Jeffrey Wright – American Fiction as Thelonious "Monk" Ellison; Bradley Cooper – Maestro as Leonard Bernstein; Paul Giamatti – The Holdovers as Paul Hunham; Cillian Murphy – Oppenheimer as J. Robert Oppenheimer; Andrew Scott – All of Us Strangers as Paul	Emma Stone – Poor Things as Bella Baxter; Lily Gladstone – Killers of the Flower Moon as Mollie Burkhart; Sandra Hüller – Anatomy of a Fall as Sandra Voyter; Greta Lee – Past Lives as Nora Moon; Margot Robbie – Barbie as Barbie
Best Supporting Actor	Best Supporting Actress
Robert Downey Jr. – Oppenheimer as Lewis Strauss; Sterling K. Brown – American Fiction as Clifford "Cliff" Ellison; Ryan Gosling – Barbie as Ken; Charles Melton – May December as Joe Yoo; Mark Ruffalo – Poor Things as Duncan Wedderburn	Da'Vine Joy Randolph – The Holdovers as Mary Lamb; Emily Blunt – Oppenheimer as Kitty Oppenheimer; Jodie Foster – Nyad as Bonnie Stoll; Sandra Hüller – The Zone of Interest as Hedwig Höss; Rachel McAdams – Are You There God? It's Me, Margaret. as Barbara Simon
Best Adapted Screenplay	Best Original Screenplay
Cord Jefferson – American Fiction; Jonathan Glazer – The Zone of Interest; Andrew Haigh – All of Us Strangers; Christopher Nolan – Oppenheimer; Tony McNamara – Poor Things	Celine Song – Past Lives; Samy Burch – May December; Greta Gerwig and Noah Baumbach – Barbie; David Hemingson – The Holdovers; Justine Triet and Arthur Harari – Anatomy of a Fall
Best Animated Feature	Best Documentary Feature
The Boy and the Heron; Elemental; Nimona; Robot Dreams; Spider-Man: Across the Spider-Verse	20 Days in Mariupol; American Symphony; Beyond Utopia; Menus-Plaisirs – Les Troisgros; Still: A Michael J. Fox Movie
Best International Feature Film	Best Cinematography
The Zone of Interest; Anatomy of a Fall; Fallen Leaves; Perfect Days; The Taste of Things	Hoyte van Hoytema – Oppenheimer; Rodrigo Prieto – Barbie; Rodrigo Prieto – Killers of the Flower Moon; Robbie Ryan – Poor Things; Łukasz Żal – The Zone of Interest
Best Film Editing	Best Original Score
Paul Watts – The Zone of Interest; Jennifer Lame – Oppenheimer; Yorgos Mavropsaridis – Poor Things; Thelma Schoonmaker – Killers of the Flower Moon; Laurent Sénéchal – Anatomy of a Fall	Robbie Robertson – Killers of the Flower Moon; Jerskin Fendrix – Poor Things; Ludwig Göransson – Oppenheimer; Mica Levi – The Zone of Interest; Daniel Pemberton – Spider-Man: Across the Spider-Verse
Best Production Design
Sarah Greenwood – Barbie; Ruth De Jong – Oppenheimer; Jack Fisk – Killers of the Flower Moon; James Price, Shona Heath, and Zsuzsa Mihalek – Poor Things; Adam Stockhausen – Asteroid City

== Special awards ==
=== Special Citation for Independent Cinema ===
- Earth Mama / Fremont (TIE)
  - The Blue Caftan

=== Marlon Riggs Award ===
- H.P. Mendoza

"For being such a Bay Area force and being a beacon of creativity, inspiration and expression. His last film attests to his versatility and his deft comedic hand. It's been quite a year for the San Francisco native. First, he transformed his 2021 art installation, Attack! Decay! Release!, into a moving, raucous multimedia extravaganza melding a feature film with live performance. Then, he premiered his latest feature, The Secret Art of Human Flight, at Tribeca, and toured with it on the festival circuit through the rest of year, collecting awards along the way. His first film not made from his own script, it never the less continues his ongoing exploration of the ties that bind."
