= List of Academy Award winners and nominees from Hungary =

This is a list of Academy Award winners and nominees born in Hungary or as Hungarians according to Hungarian nationality law-people who hold Hungarian citizenship acquired by descent from a Hungarian parent or by naturalisation.

== Best Director ==
Director
Year	Name	Film	Status	Notes
1935	Michael Curtiz	Captain Blood	Nominated	
1938	Michael Curtiz	Angels with Dirty Faces	Nominated	
1938	Michael Curtiz	Four Daughters	Nominated	
1942	Michael Curtiz	Yankee Doodle Dandy	Nominated	
1943	Michael Curtiz	Casablanca	Won	
1964	George Cukor	My Fair Lady	Won	US-born

== Best Actor in a Leading Role ==
Best Actor
Year	Name	Film	Status	Milestone / Notes
1932-33	Leslie Howard	Berkeley Square	Nominated	László Steiner, UK-born
1938	Leslie Howard	Pygmalion	Nominated	Co-directed by Leslie Howard Produced by Gabriel Pascal
1943	Paul Lukas	Watch on the Rhine	Won	Was against possible communist influences in Hollywood.
1945	Cornel Wilde	A Song to Remember	Nominated	Dir:Charles Vidor, music:Miklós Rózsa
1958	Tony Curtis*	The Defiant One	Nominated	Hungarian speaker. Mother Helen Klein b. in Valkó
1958	Paul Newman*	Cat on a Hot Tin Roof	Nominated	Hungarian father. US-born
1961	Paul Newman*	The Hustler	Nominated	
1963	Paul Newman*	Hud	Nominated	
1967	Paul Newman*	Cool Hand Luke	Nominated	
1981	Paul Newman*	Absence of Malice	Nominated	
1982	Paul Newman*	The Verdict	Nominated	
1986	Paul Newman*	The Color of Money	Won	
1994	Paul Newman*	Nobody's Fool	Nominated	
2002	Adrien Brody*	The Pianist	Won	Hungarian mother
2024	Adrien Brody*	The Brutalist	Won	

"*"=US-born

== Best Actor in a Supporting Role ==
Best Supporting Actor
Year	Name	Film	Status	Milestone / Notes
2002	Paul Newman*	Road to Perdition	Nominated	Hungarian father, US-born

"*"= US-born

== Best Actress in a Leading Role ==
Best Actress
Year	Name	Film	Status	Milestone / Notes
1970	Ali MacGraw*	Love Story	Nominated	Hungarian mother, US-born
2016	Isabelle Huppert	Elle	Nominated	Hungarian grandfather, French-born

"*"= US-born

== Best Actress in a Supporting Role ==
Best Supporting Actress
Year	Name	Film	Status	Milestone / Notes
1969	Goldie Hawn*	Cactus Flower	Won	Hungarian mother, US-born
2005	Rachel Weisz	The Constant Gardener	Won	Hungarian father, UK-born
2018	Rachel Weisz	The Favourite	Nominated	
2022	Jamie Lee Curtis*	Everything Everywhere All at Once	Won	Hungarian father Tony Curtis, US-born

"*"= US-born

== Best Short Subject ==
Best Short Subject
Year	Name	Film	Status	Milestone / Notes
1934	Jules White	Men in Black	Nominated	Born as Gyula Weisz in Budapest
1935	Jules White	Oh, My Nerves	Nominated	Born as Gyula Weisz in Budapest
1939	Michael Curtiz	Sons of Liberty	Won	
1945	Jules White	The Jury Goes Round 'N' Round	Nominated	
1946	Jules White	Hiss and Yell	Nominated	

== Best Documentary (Long Subject) ==
Best Documentary Feature Film
Year	Name	Film	Status	Milestone / Notes
1977	Robert Dornhelm	The Children of Theatre Street	Nominated	Born in Temesvár.Hungarian-Jewish father. Mother a German speaker.
1993	Chris Hegedus	The War Room	Nominated	
2000	Kevin MacDonald	One Day In September	Won	Hungarian citizen/grand-father Imre Pressburger
2018*	Elizabeth Chai Vasarhelyi	Free Solo	Won	Hungarian father
2019	Steven Bognar*	American Factory	Won	Hungarian father (Escaped 1956)

* = US-born

== Best Documentary (Short Subject) ==
Best Short Subject
Year	Name	Film	Status	Milestone / Notes
1965	Mafilm	Overture	Nominated	
1966	Mafilm	Saint Matthew Passion	Nominated	
1969	Joan Horvath	Jenny Is a Good Thing	Nominated	
1971	Robert Amram	Sentinels of Silence	Won	Shared with Manuel Arango
1975	Steven Kovacs	Artur and Lillie	Nominated	Shared with Jon Else and Kristine Samuelson
1979	Phillip Borsos	Nails	Nominated	
2009	Steven Bognar	The Last Truck	Nominated	Hungarian father (Escaped 1956)

== Best Picture ==
Best Picture
Year	Producer	Film	Status	Milestone / Notes
1927-28	William Fox (producer)	Sunrise: A Song of Two Humans	Won	Directed by F. W. Murnau
1932-33	Alexander Korda	The Private Life of Henry VIII	Nominated	
1938	Gabriel Pascal	Pygmalion	Nominated	Born in Arad, Arad County
1968	Paul Newman	Rachel, Rachel	Nominated	
1993	Branko Lustig	Schindler's List	Won	Parents Hungarian Jews from Újvidék
1999	Frank Darabont	The Green Mile	Nominated	
2000	Branko Lustig	Gladiator	Won	Parents Hungarian Jews from Újvidék
2009	Ivan Reitman	Up in the Air	Nominated	Hungarian Jew from Komárom
2012	Margaret Menegoz (born Baranyai)	Amour	Nominated	Most EFA-awarded Hungarian: 3 wins/4 nominations (out of ca 16 wins)

== Best Adapted Screenplay ==
Best Adapted Screenplay
Year	Name	Film	Status	Milestone / Notes
1930-31	Francis Edward Faragoh	Little Caesar	Nominated	
1937	Geza Herczeg	The Life of Emile Zola	Won	
1942	Emeric Pressburger	49th Parallel	Nominated	
1948	Frank Partos	The Snake Pit	Nominated	
1971	Ernest Tidyman	The French Connection	Won	Hungarian mother
1994	Frank Darabont	The Shawshank Redemption	Nominated	(Parents escaped 1956.)
1999	Frank Darabont	The Green Mile	Nominated	

== Best Original Screenplay ==
Best Original Screenplay
Year	Name	Film	Status	Milestone / Notes
1927-28	Lajos Bíró	The Last Command	Nominated	Born in Nagyvárad
1940	János Székely	Arise, My Love	Won	
1942	Emeric Pressburger	One of Our Aircraft Is Missing	Nominated	Born in Miskolcz
1949	Robert Pirosh*	Battleground	Won	US-born
1951	Robert Pirosh*	Go for Broke!	Nominated	US-born
2015	Dan Gilroy*	Nightcrawler	Nominated	US-born, mother HUN

* = US-born

== Best Original Story ==
Best Story
Year	Name	Film	Status	Milestone / Notes
1937	Geza Herczeg	The Life of Emile Zola	Nominated	Born in Nagykanizsa
1939	Melchior Lengyel	Ninotchka	Nominated	
1942	Emeric Pressburger	49th Parallel	Won	Most awarded Hungarian in screenplay categories: 1 AA out of 4 nominations.
1945	László Görög	The Affairs of Susan	Nominated	Shared with Thomas Monroe
1948	Emeric Pressburger	The Red Shoes	Nominated	Born in Miskolcz.
1950	André de Toth	The Gunfighter	Nominated	Shared with William Bowers

== Best Dance Direction ==
Academy Award for Best Dance Direction
Year	Name	Film	Status	Milestone / Notes
1935	Dave Gould	Folies Bergère de Paris	Won	Born as Dezsö Guttman in Cigánd
1935	Dave Gould	Broadway Melody of 1936	Won	
1936	Dave Gould	Born to Dance	Nominated	
1937	Dave Gould	A Day at the Races	Nominated	

== Best Art Direction ==
Best Art Direction
Year	Name	Film	Status	Milestone / Notes
1932–33	William S. Darling	Cavalcade	Won	Born in Sandorháza, Banat, Transylvania; Kingdom of Hungary as Vilmos Sándorházy
1936	William S. Darling	Lloyd's of London	Nominated	
1937	William S. Darling	Wee Willie Winkie	Nominated	
1939	William S. Darling	The Rains Came	Nominated	
1940	Vincent Korda	The Thief of Bagdad	Won	Color
1940	Paul Groesse	Pride and Prejudice	Won	Black & White
1941	Vincent Korda	That Hamilton Woman	Nominated	
1942	Vincent Korda	Jungle Book	Nominated	
1943	Paul Groesse	Madame Curie	Nominated	
1943	William S. Darling	The Song of Bernadette	Won	shared with James Basevi
1945	William S. Darling	The Keys of the Kingdom	Nominated	
1946	William S. Darling	Anna and the King of Siam	Won	Black & White, shared with Lyle R. Wheeler
1946	Paul Groesse	The Yearling	Won	Color
1949	Paul Groesse	Little Women	Won	
1950	Paul Groesse	Annie Get Your Gun	Nominated	
1951	Paul Groesse	Too Young to Kiss	Nominated	
1952	Paul Groesse	The Merry Widow	Nominated	
1953	Paul Groesse	Lili	Nominated	
1952	Marcel Vertès	Moulin Rouge	Won	
1959	Joseph Kish	Journey to the Center of the Earth	Nominated	
1960	Alexandre Trauner	The Apartment	Won	
1962	Paul Groesse	The Music Man	Nominated	
1962	Vincent Korda	The Longest Day	Nominated	
1963	Paul Groesse	Twilight of Honor	Nominated	
1966	Paul Groesse	Mister Buddwing	Nominated	
1965	Joseph Kish	The Slender Thread	Nominated	
1965	Joseph Kish	Ship of Fools	Won	
1976	Alexandre Trauner	The Man Who Would Be King	Nominated	
2021	Zsuzsanna Sipos	Dune	Won	won BAFTA
2023	Zsuzsa Mihalek	Poor Things	Won	won BAFTA

== Best Costume Design ==
Costume Design
Year	Name	Film	Status	Notes
1952	Marcel Vertès	Moulin Rouge	Won	

== Best Makeup ==
Makeup
Year	Name	Film	Status	Notes
1985	Zoltan Elek	Mask	Won	

== Best International Feature film ==
Best International Feature Film
Year	Film	Director	Status	Milestone / Notes
1956	The Captain from Köpenick (for Western Germany)	Gyula Trebitsch (producer)	Nominated (for West Germany)	Co-producer for Germany
1966	The Shop on Main Street (for Czechoslovakia)	Jan Kadar (Born in Budapest as János Kádár)	Won (for Czechoslovakia)	Shared with Elmar Klos
1964	Sallah Shabati (for Israel)	Ephraim Kishon (Born in Budapest as Ferenc Hoffman)	Nominated (for Israel)	First ever Israeli film in category Best Foreign Film
1971	The Policeman (for Israel)	Ephraim Kishon	Nominated (for Israel)	
1968	The Boys of Paul Street	Zoltán Fábri	Nominated	
1974	Cats' Play	Károly Makk	Nominated	
1978	Hungarians	Zoltán Fábri	Nominated	
1978	Madame Rosa (for France)	Jean Bolvary co-producer	Won (For France)	For France
1980	Confidence	István Szabó	Nominated	
1981	Mephisto	István Szabó	Won	
1983	Job's Revolt	Imre Gyöngyössy and Barna Kabay	Nominated	
1985	Colonel Redl	István Szabó	Nominated	
1988	Hanussen	István Szabó	Nominated	
2004	Ondskan (for Sweden)	Mikael Håfström	Nominated (for Sweden)	Hungarian mother from Pozsony
2014	The Notebook	Janos Szász	Shortlisted	
2015	Son of Saul	László Nemes	Won	
2017	On Body and Soul	Ildikó Enyedi	Nominated	
2019	Those Who Remained	Barnabás Tóth	Shortlisted	

== Best Cinematography ==
Best Cinematography
Year	Name	Film	Status	Notes
1941	Rudolph Maté	Foreign Correspondent	Nominated	
1942	Rudolph Maté	That Hamilton Woman	Nominated	Dir: Alexander Korda Music: Miklós Rózsa
1943	Rudolph Maté	The Pride of the Yankees	Nominated	
1944	Rudolph Maté	Sahara	Nominated	Directed by Korda. Music by Rózsa.
1945	Rudolph Maté	Cover Girl	Nominated	Shared with Allen M. Davey; Director: Charles Vidor
1951	John Alton	An American in Paris	Won	Born as János/Johann Altmann in Sopron; Color. Shared with Alfred Gilks
1960	Ernest Laszlo	Inherit the Wind	Nominated	Music by 1/2- Hungarian Gold.
1961	Ernest Laszlo	Judgment at Nuremberg	Nominated	Music by Ernest Gold.
1963	Ernest Laszlo	It's a Mad, Mad, Mad, Mad World	Nominated	
1965	Ernest Laszlo	Ship of Fools	Won	Black-and-White
1966	Ernest Laszlo	Fantastic Voyage	Nominated	
1968	Ernest Laszlo	Star!	Nominated	
1970	Ernest Laszlo	Airport	Nominated	
1976	Ernest Laszlo	Logan's Run	Nominated	
1977	Vilmos Zsigmond	Close Encounters of the Third Kind	Won	
1978	Vilmos Zsigmond	The Deer Hunter	Nominated	
1984	Vilmos Zsigmond	The River	Nominated	
2001	Lajos Koltai	Malèna	Nominated	
2006	Vilmos Zsigmond	The Black Dahlia	Nominated	

== Best Animated Short film ==
Best Animated Short Film
Year	Name	Film	Status	Milestone / Notes
1941	George Pal	Rhythm in the Ranks	Nominated	
1942	George Pal	Tulips Shall Grow	Nominated	
1943	George Pal	The 500 Hats of Bartholomew Cubbins	Nominated	
1944	George Pal	And to Think That I Saw It on Mulberry Street	Nominated	
1945	George Pal	Jasper and the Beanstalk	Nominated	
1946	George Pal	John Henry and the Inky-Poo	Nominated	
1947	George Pal	Tubby the Tuba	Nominated	
1963	Jules Engel	Icarus Montgolfier Wright	Nominated	
1964	John Halas	Automania 2000	Nominated	
1975	Peter Foldes	Hunger	Nominated	
1976	Marcell Jankovics	Sisyphus	Nominated	
1980	Ferenc Rofusz	The Fly	Won	
2007	Géza M. Tóth	Maestro	Nominated	
2014	Réka Bucsi	Symphony no.42	Shortlisted	
2023	Flóra Anna Buda	27	Shortlisted	

== Best Live Action Short film ==
Best Live Action Short Film
Year	Director	Film	Status	Milestone / Notes
1963	Istvan Szabo	Concert	Nominated	
1971	Robert Amram	Sentinels of Silence	Won	Shared with Manuel Arango
2016	Kristóf Deák	Sing	Won	

== Best Original Score ==
Best Original Music Score
Year	Name	Film	Status	Milestone / Notes
1935	Max Steiner	The Informer	Won	Father Gábor was born in Temesvár, Kingdom of Hungary.
1936	Max Steiner	The Garden of Allah	Nominated	
1938	Max Steiner	Jezebel	Nominated	
1939	Max Steiner	Dark Victory	Nominated	
1939	Max Steiner	Gone With the Wind	Nominated	
1940	Miklós Rózsa	The Thief of Baghdad	Nominated	Producer: Alexander Korda
1941	Miklós Rózsa	Lydia	Nominated	
1941	Miklós Rózsa	Sundown	Nominated	
1942	Miklós Rózsa	Jungle Book	Nominated	
1943	Max Steiner	Now, Voyager	Won	
1944	Miklós Rózsa	Double Indemnity	Nominated	
1944	Miklós Rózsa	The Woman of the Town	Nominated	
1944	Karl Hajos	Summer Storm	Nominated	
1945	Karl Hajos	The Man Who Walked Alone	Nominated	
1945	Leo Erdody	The Minstrel Man	Nominated	
1945	Max Steiner	Since You Went Away	Won	
1945	Miklós Rózsa	Spellbound	Won	
1945	Miklós Rózsa	The Lost Weekend	Nominated	
1945	Miklós Rózsa	A Song to Remember	Nominated	
1946	Miklós Rózsa	The Killers	Nominated	
1947	Miklós Rózsa	Double Life	Won	
1951	Miklós Rózsa	Quo Vadis	Nominated	
1952	Miklós Rózsa	Ivanhoe	Nominated	
1953	Miklós Rózsa	Julius Caesar	Nominated	
1959	Miklós Rózsa	Ben-Hur	Won	
1961	Miklós Rózsa	El Cid	Nominated	
1961	Ernest Gold; Schurmann orchestrated (both 1/2 Hungarians)	Exodus	Won	Ernest Gold's paternal grandmother: Jaiteles/Szmetan from Szeged and his maternal grandmother:(Sprung/Slazka) from Temesvár (Spitzer/Gross) from Budapest
1963	Oscar to Jarre but Gerard Schurmann orchestrated	Lawrence of Arabia	{won} (association to only)	Hungarian mother studied with Béla Bartók

== Best Film Editing ==
Best Film Editing
Year	Director	Film	Status	Milestone / Notes
2024	Dávid Jancsó	The Brutalist	Nominated	First Hungarian nominated for Best Film Editing

== Technical and scientific ==
Technical/Scientific Awards
Year	Name	Film	Status	Milestone / Notes
1941	Joe Lapis		Nominated	Best special effects
1944	George Pal		Won	For the development of novel methods and techniques in the production of short subjects known as Puppetoons
1949	Steve Csillag		Won	
1950	George Pal Productions	Destination Moon	Won	Academy Award for Best Visual Effects
1951	George Pal (produced by)	When Worlds Collide	Won	Special Achievements Award
1953	George Pal (produced by)	The War of the Worlds	Won	Academy Award for Best Visual Effects
1985	Chuck Gaspar*	Ghostbusters	Nominated	shared Technical Award (cinematography:László Kovács direction: Ivan Reitman)
1988	Dr.Antal Lisziewicz		Won	Dr. Antal Lisziewicz and Glenn M. Berggren of ISCO-OPTIC GmbH for the design and development of the Ultra-Star series of motion picture lenses.
1992	Robert Orban?*		Won	Scientific and Technical Award (Scientific and Engineering Award). To Claus Wiedemann and Robert Orban for the design and Dolby Laboratories for the development of the Dolby Labs “Container”/Orban is a Hungarian surname, but not exclusively
1996	Attila Szalay		Won	shared Scientific & Technical Award
1998	Bill Kovacs*		Won	The Advanced Visualizer; Scientific & Technical Award
2004	Gyula Mester		Won	GYULA MESTER (electronic systems design) and KEITH EDWARDS (mechanical engineering) for their significant contributions to and continuing development of the Technocrane telescoping camera crane.
2010	Márk Jászberényi, Perlaki and Gyula Priskin		Won	For their contributions to the development of the Lustre color correction system, which enables real-time digital manipulation of motion picture imagery during the digital intermediate process.
2014	Tibor Madjar, Imre Major and Csaba Kőhegyi		Won	To Andrew Camenisch, David Cardwell and Tibor Madjar for the concept and design, and to Csaba Kohegyi (from Nyíregyháza) and Imre Major (from Hajdúböszörmény) for the implementation of the Mudbox software.
2014	Chuck Gaspar*		Won	(shared) As Technical Achievement Award
2021	Attila T. Áfra		Won	shared
2023	Christopher Jon Horvath*		Won	Hungarian family name
2024	Attila T. Áfra		Won	shared
2026	Eszter Offertaler		Won	
40s?	Béla Gáspár	1st full color one-strip film	{won} ?	Patents sold to Technicolor, 3M and reputedly included in AA wins

* = US-born

== Honorary Award ==
Academy Honorary Award
Year	Name	Status	Notes
1949	Adolph Zukor	Won	Hungarian-Jewish, buried in the flag of Kingdom of Hungary
1979	King Vidor	Won	US-born
1986	Paul Newman	Won	3/4-Hungarian, mother born in Peticse, Kingdom of Hungary

=== Irving G. Thalberg Memorial Award ===
This list focuses on recipients of Irving G. Thalberg Memorial Award.

Irving G. Thalberg Memorial Award
Year	Name	Country	Awarded	Status	Milestone/Notes
1939	Joe Pasternak	(Hungary)	43rd Academy Awards	Nominated	Born in Szilágysomlyó, Transylvania, Kingdom of Hungary

== Jean Hersholt Award ==
Jean Hersholt Award
Year	Name	Status	Notes
1993	Paul Newman	Won	3/4-Hungarian, mother born in Peticse, Kingdom of Hungary
