= Karen O'Hara =

American set decorator

- Occupation: Set decorator
- Years active: 1981–present

Karen O'Hara is an American set decorator. She won an Academy Award in the category Best Art Direction for the film Alice in Wonderland and was additionally nominated three times, for The Color of Money Ma Rainey's Black Bottom, and The Fabelmans.

== Selected filmography ==
- Code of Silence (1985)
- One More Saturday Night (1986)
- The Color of Money (1986)
- Vice Versa (1988)
- Men Don't Leave (1990)
- The Silence of the Lambs (1991)
- True Identity (1991)
- Lorenzo's Oil (1992)
- Barbarians at the Gate (1993)
- Philadelphia (1993)
- The War (1994)
- The American President (1995)
- Ghosts of Mississippi (1996)
- Beloved (1998)
- For Love of the Game (1999)
- What Lies Beneath (2000)
- Cast Away (2000)
- Spider-Man (2002)
- Red Dragon (2002)
- The Polar Express (2004)
- Christmas with the Kranks (2004)
- Bewitched (2005)
- License to Wed (2007)
- Beowulf (2007)
- A Christmas Carol (2009)
- Alice in Wonderland (2010)
- In Time (2011)
- The Guilt Trip (2012)
- Walk of Shame (2014)
- Blended (2014)
- Mortdecai (2015)
- Paul Blart: Mall Cop 2 (2015)
- The Do-Over (2016)
- Sandy Wexler (2017)
- Thank You for Your Service (2017)
- Ad Astra (2019)
- Spenser Confidential (2020)
- Ma Rainey's Black Bottom (2020)
- The Fabelmans (2022)
