= Mister Buddwing =

1966 film by Delbert Mann

- Film poster
- Directed by: Delbert Mann
- Screenplay by: Dale Wasserman
- Based on: Buddwing; 1964 novel by Evan Hunter
- Produced by: Douglas Laurence; Delbert Mann
- Starring: James Garner; Jean Simmons; Suzanne Pleshette; Angela Lansbury
- Cinematography: Ellsworth Fredericks
- Edited by: Fredric Steinkamp
- Music by: Kenyon Hopkins
- Production company: Metro-Goldwyn-Mayer
- Distributed by: Metro-Goldwyn-Mayer
- Release date: October 11, 1966 (U.S.)
- Running time: 100 minutes
- Country: United States
- Language: English

Mister Buddwing is a 1966 American film drama starring James Garner, Jean Simmons, Suzanne Pleshette, Katharine Ross, and Angela Lansbury. Directed by Delbert Mann, the film depicts a well-dressed man who wakes up on a bench in Central Park with no idea who he is. He proceeds to wander around Manhattan desperately trying to figure out his own identity. He meets various women, played by Lansbury, Ross, Pleshette, and Simmons, and each woman triggers fragments of his deeply-buried memories.

Based on the 1964 novel Buddwing by Evan Hunter, the black-and-white drama was written by Dale Wasserman, and accompanied by a jazz-based musical score written by Kenyon Hopkins.

In his memoirs, Garner said "I'd summarize the plot but to this day I have no clue what it is. Worst picture I ever made. What were they thinking? What was I thinking?"

== Plot ==
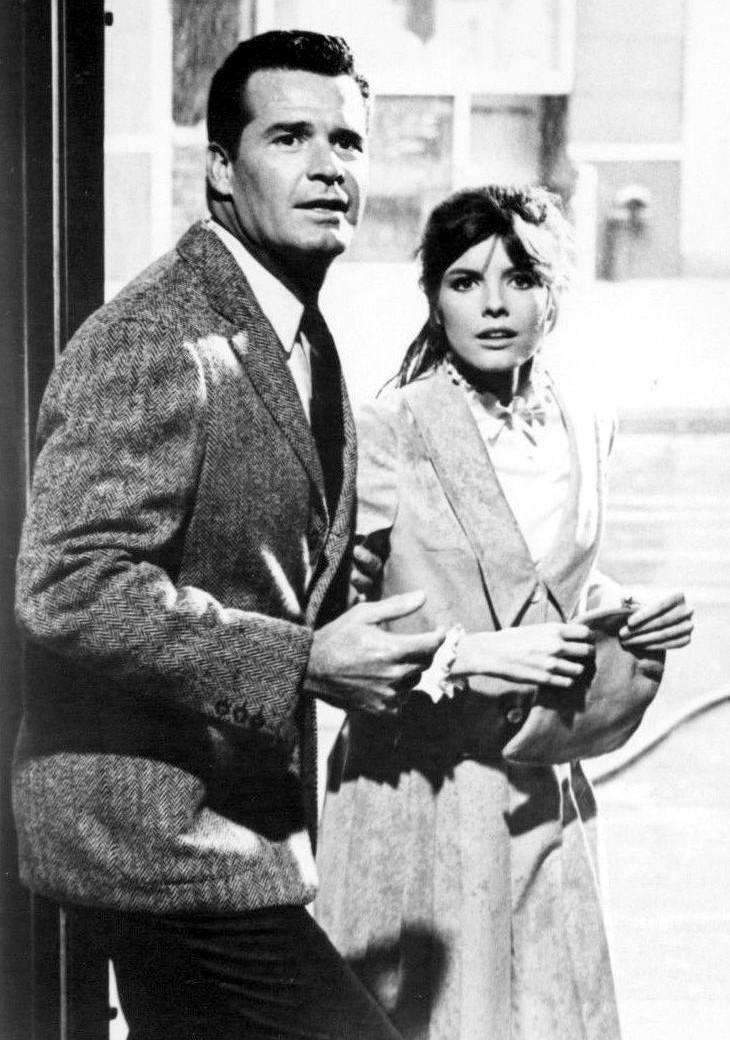
James Garner and Katharine Ross in Mister Buddwing (1966)

A man wakes up on a park bench in Central Park to find that his mind is a total blank. He has no identification or money, just a folded slip of paper enclosing two large white pills with a phone number written on it.

He rings the number, reaching Gloria, who first mistakes him for her shiftless husband, Sam. Arranging a rendezvous, he creates a name for himself, appropriating "Sam" and cobbling "Buddwing" from the first two things that seize his attention, a Budweiser beer truck and an airplane. Gloria, a liquor-sodden slattern, does not recognize him but gives him a handful of cash as he is leaving, purely out of pity.

Trying to pull himself together over breakfast, he sees a giant headline blaring the escape of a violently insane criminal. Finding a possible match with one of the initials inside a ring he is wearing, he immediately fears he is the fugitive.

Shortly after, he spots a woman on the street he thinks he knows and hails her as "Grace." A student at a music school in Washington Square, Janet proves a stranger, but a flashback of a romance with her from college days portrays him as a struggling student composer, and they impulsively marry.

Back in the park, Janet rejects his attentions and creates a scene. A policeman arrives, Buddwing is questioned, but flees when the patrolman becomes distracted by hecklers.

He is pursued by a mad street person, who raves that Buddwing is the murderer on the loose.

Buddwing races away, aimlessly roams the sidewalks, and soon meets coquettish actress "Fiddle," whom he believes is Grace. They have sex, after which he instinctively begins to play piano, jarring loose more fragments of his evident former identity. Falling asleep in her arms he roils in a nightmare of fighting with her as his wife - over a pregnancy he feels they cannot afford. He insists on an abortion. Crushed, "Grace" climbs over the rail of the 59th Street Bridge, ready to commit suicide. He grabs her just in time.

He flees once again, ending up trying to drown his torment with a pint of whisky. A drunken socialite out for kicks on a scavenger hunt spies the tall, handsome man on the sidewalk. After boozing some together on the nearest stoop, the pair end up in Harlem, seeking to clear $100,000 in a craps game to complete her list. Becoming woozy, Buddwing once again lapses into delirium, with the floozy as his troubled wife, Grace. In spite of having achieved financial success, the couple has lost everything: She is a miserable tramp, unable to get over an abortion that left her sterile; he is trapped in his own web of affluence at the expense of honoring his inborn talent.

In his trance, he sees a blood-spattered vanity and a razor blade. At once it dawns on him that he had asked the operator to dial the right phone number in the wrong area code. Rather than the "Monument" exchange on the Upper West Side of Manhattan, it was for Mount Kisco to the north in Westchester County. He calls and reaches a hospital, and it catalyzes for him that everything had been as it was in his last flashback. Grace had really slashed her wrists, and was barely alive.

He begs to see her. He takes her lifeless arm and calls her name. He feels her last breaths ebbing away. Slowly the limb moves, beckoning his hand. He takes hers and clasps it in his, sharing his rediscovered life force.

== Cast ==
- James Garner as Mr. Buddwing
- Jean Simmons as The Blonde
- Suzanne Pleshette as Fiddle Corwin
- Katharine Ross as Janet
- Angela Lansbury as Gloria
- George Voskovec as Shabby Old Man
- Jack Gilford as Mr. Schwartz
- Joe Mantell as 1st cab driver
- Billy Halop as 2nd cab driver
- Raymond St. Jacques as Hank
- Ken Lynch as Dan
- Nichelle Nichols as Dice Player
- Charles Seel as Printer
- Beeson Carroll as Policeman

== Awards and honors ==
The film received Academy Award nominations for Best Costume Design, Black and White (Helen Rose), and Best Art Direction, Black and White (George Davis, Paul Groesse, Henry Grace, and Hugh Hunt).

== See also ==
- List of American films of 1966
