= Jenny Is a Good Thing =

1969 American documentary short film

- Directed by: Joan Horvath
- Narrated by: Burt Lancaster
- Production company: A.C.I. Productions
- Distributed by: Project Head Start, Office of Child Development, U.S. Department of Health, Education and Welfare
- Release date: 1969
- Running time: 18 minutes
- Country: United States
- Language: English

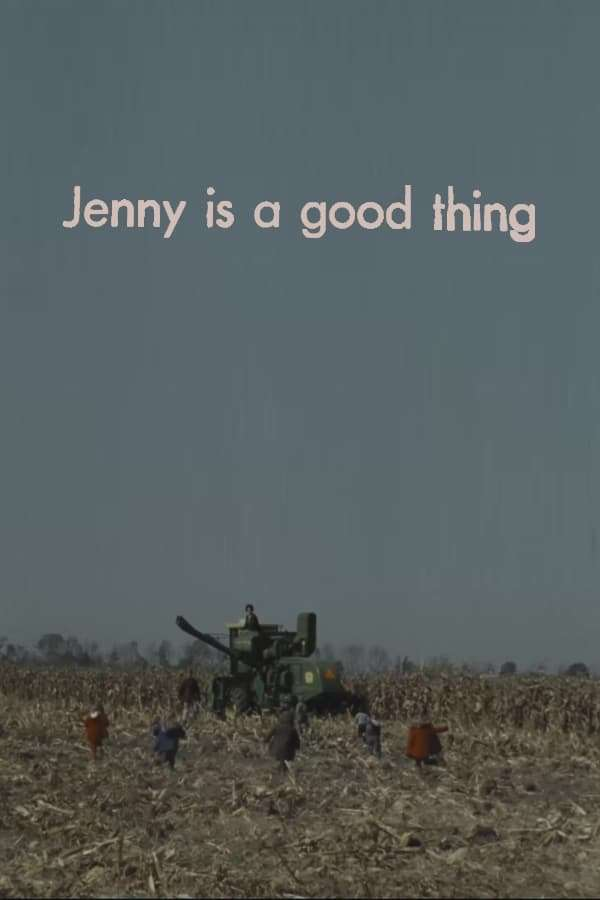
Jenny is a good thing movie poster

Jenny Is a Good Thing is a 1969 American short documentary film about children and poverty, directed by Joan Horvath. Produced by Project Head Start, it shows the importance of good nutrition for underprivileged nursery school children. The film was nominated for an Academy Award for Best Documentary Short.
