= Paul Groesse =

American art director

- Born: 28 February 1906; Hungary
- Died: 4 May 1987 (aged 81); Los Angeles, California, United States
- Occupation: Art director
- Years active: 1937–1967

Paul Groesse (28 February 1906 – 4 May 1987) was a Hungarian-born American art director. He won three Academy Awards and was nominated for another eight in the category Best Art Direction.

== Academy Awards ==
Groesse won three Academy Awards for Best Art Direction and was nominated a further eight times in the same category:

Won

- Pride and Prejudice (1940)
- The Yearling (1946)
- Little Women (1949)

Nominated

- Madame Curie (1943)
- Annie Get Your Gun (1950)
- Too Young to Kiss (1951)
- The Merry Widow (1952)
- Lili (1953)
- The Music Man (1962)
- Twilight of Honor (1963)
- Mister Buddwing (1966)
