= Zsuzsa Mihalek =

Hungarian set decorator

- Born: 1966 (age 59–60); Budapest, Hungary
- Occupation: Set decorator

Zsuzsa Mihalek (born 1966) is a Hungarian set decorator. She won an Academy Award in the category Best Production Design for the film Poor Things.

At the 77th British Academy Film Awards, she won a BAFTA Award for Best Production Design. Her win was shared with Shona Heath and James Price.

== Selected filmography ==
- The Munsters (2022)
- Poor Things (2023)
- Lee (2023)
- All the Light We Cannot See (2023, TV miniseries)

== See also ==
- List of Hungarian Academy Award winners and nominees
