= James Price (art director) =

British art director and production designer

- Occupations: Art director, production designer

James Price is a British art director and production designer. He won an Academy Award in the category Best Production Design for the film Poor Things.

At the 77th British Academy Film Awards, he won a BAFTA Award for Best Production Design. His win was shared with Shona Heath and Zsuzsa Mihalek.

== Selected filmography ==
- The Nest (2020)
- Poor Things (2023)
- The Iron Claw (2023)
- Speak No Evil (2024)
- Bugonia (2025)
- Clayface (2026)
