= Claire Kaufman =

American set decorator

- Occupation: Set decorator

Claire Kaufman is an American set decorator. She was nominated for an Academy Award in the category Best Production Design for the film Oppenheimer.

Claire was invited to join the production of the film Oppenheimer by production designer Ruth De Jong.

In 2018, she was nominated for a Primetime Emmy Award in the category Outstanding Production Design for a Narrative Contemporary Program (One Hour or More) for her work on the television program American Horror Story: Cult.

== Selected filmography ==
- Grind (2003)
- Grandma's Boy (2006)
- Grown Ups (2010)
- Just Go with It (2011)
- Little Women (2019)
- Bliss (2021)
- Hustle (2022)
- White Noise (2022)
- Oppenheimer (2023)
