= Adam Willis (set decorator) =

American set decorator

- Occupation: Set decorator
- Spouse: Gloria Dyer

Adam Willis is an American set decorator. He was nominated for two Academy Awards in the category Best Production Design for the films Killers of the Flower Moon and Marty Supreme.

== Selected filmography ==
- Take Shelter (2011)
- Spring Breakers (2012)
- At Any Price (2012)
- Ain't Them Bodies Saints (2013)
- The Sacrement (2013)
- The Last of Robin Hood (2013)
- Camp X-Ray (2014)
- Midnight Special (2016)
- Loving (2016)
- Killers of the Flower Moon (2023; co-nominated with Jack Fisk)
- Marty Supreme (2025; co-nominated with Jack Fisk)
