= Shona Heath =

British production designer

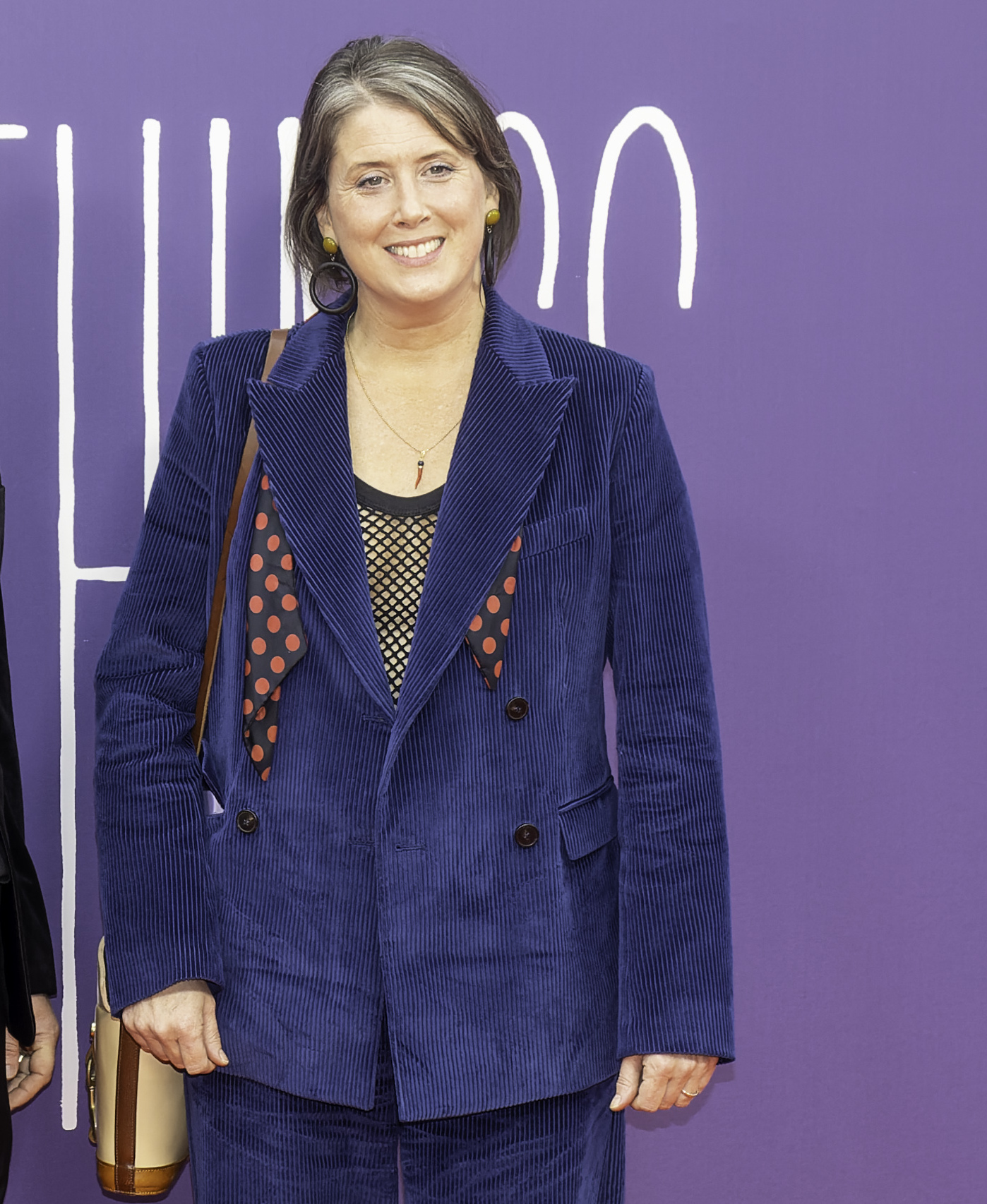
- Occupation: Production designer

Shona Heath is a British production designer. She won an Academy Award for Best Production Design for the film Poor Things.

At the 77th British Academy Film Awards, she won a BAFTA Award for Best Production Design. Her win was shared with James Price and Zsuzsa Mihalek.

== Selected filmography ==
- The Lost Explorer (2010)
- The Magic Paintbrush (2016)
- Eye Ear You (2022)
- Poor Things (2023)
