= Mstyslav Chernov =

Ukrainian photojournalist and war correspondent (born 1985)

- Мстислав Чернов
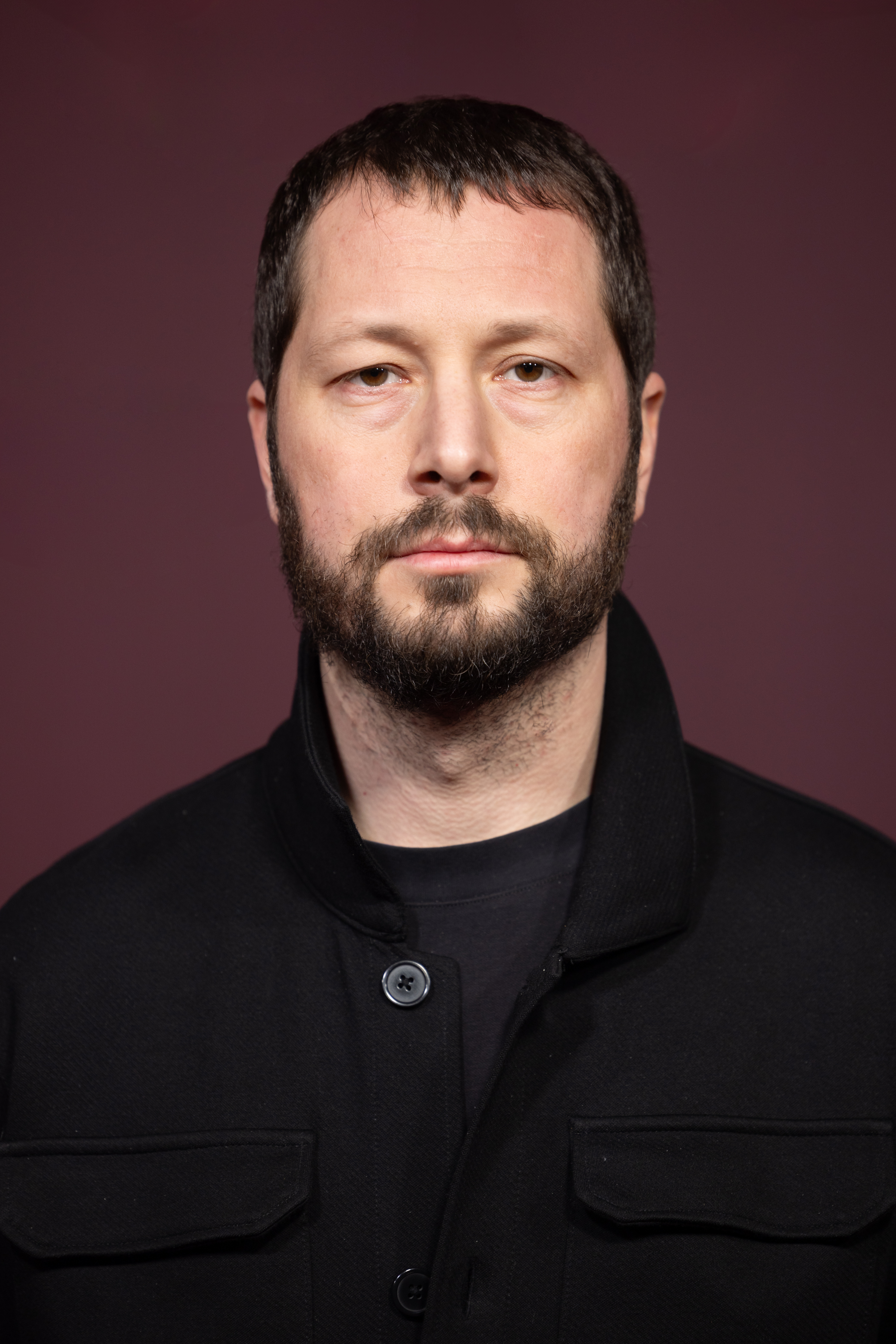
- Chernov in 2025
- Born: 1985 (age 40–41); Kharkov, Ukrainian SSR, Soviet Union (now Kharkiv, Ukraine)
- Occupations: Visual journalist; Photographer; War correspondent
- Employer: The Associated Press
- Website: www.mstyslav.com

Mstyslav Andriiovych Chernov (Ukrainian: Мстислав Андрійович Чернов, IPA: [mstɪˈslɑu̯ ɐnˈd⁽ʲ⁾r⁽ʲ⁾ijowɪtʃ tʃerˈnɔu̯]; born 1985) is a Ukrainian filmmaker, war correspondent, videographer, photographer, photojournalist, and novelist. In the field of documentary filmmaking, he is known as the director of 20 Days in Mariupol and 2000 Meters to Andriyivka.

A Pulitzer Prize and Academy Award winner known for his coverage of the Revolution of Dignity, War in Donbas, the downing of flight MH17, Syrian civil war, Battle of Mosul in Iraq, and the 2022 Russian invasion of Ukraine, including the Siege of Mariupol.

For his work on the Siege of Mariupol he received the Pulitzer Prize for Public Service, Deutsche Welle Freedom of Speech Award, the Knight International Journalism Awards, Bayeux Calvados-Normandy Award, Elijah Parish Lovejoy Award, Free Media Awards, CJFE International Press Freedom Award, Royal Television Society Television Journalism Awards, and Shevchenko National Prize. Video materials from Mariupol became the basis of the film 20 Days in Mariupol, which was included in the competition program of the Sundance Film Festival in 2023. The film won the Audience Award in World Cinema Documentary category. The film later won the BAFTA Award for Best Documentary and Best Documentary Feature Film at the 96th Academy Awards. Chernov himself won Directors Guild of America Awards, Writers Guild of America Award, Emmy Award. In 2023, he shared the Pulitzer Prize for Public Service with Evgeniy Maloletka, Vasilisa Stepanenko, and Lori Hinnant.

In 2026, he shared ASC Award and George Polk Award with Alex Babenko. He has both won and been a finalist for the Livingston Award, Rory Peck Award, Reporters Without Borders Press Freedom Prize, and various Royal Television Society awards.

Chernov's photos and videos have been published and broadcast by many media outlets around the world, including CNN, BBC, The New York Times, The Washington Post and others.

Chernov is an Associated Press journalist and the President of the Ukrainian Association of Professional Photographers (UAPF). He has been a member of "Ukrainian PEN" since July 2022.

Born in Kharkiv, his family is half Ukrainian, half German.

== Career in photography and journalism ==
=== Fine-art and documentary photography: 2005–2013 ===
Chernov started his career in photography in 2005, working for a local Kharkiv news agency MediaPort. He gained prominence in 2008 when he received the 1st prize at a local photography exhibition "Kharkiv through the eyes of its inhabitants". In the same year, he had his first personal photography exhibition "Musica per somnia," conceived and organized with assistance of Yuriy Yanko, the Director of Kharkiv Philharmonic Society, who was impressed by Chernov's photographs of Sayaka Shoji, a Japanese violinist, then performing with Kharkiv Philarmonics. In 2009, Chernov won another first place award in local photo expo "Almost disappearing Kharkiv", covering crumbling examples of the city's older architecture.

Starting in 2008, Chernov worked with Chernobyl Children International, the Novick Cardiac Alliance, photographing cardiac surgeries. Chernov's transition to documentary photography continued. In 2012 he lived in Cambodia, focusing on local health care and cultural projects.

Meanwhile, by 2013, Chernov's work gained national recognition. His 2013 photographs landed him the first place in the Ukrainian contest "Photographer of the Year" in nomination documentary photography. In the same year, Chernov was a winner of the Pentax Awards Ukraine 2013 and Best Press Photographer, Ukraine, nomination "portrait". He photographed in over forty countries and had another personal exhibition, Rainy Season, featuring images of the Far East.

In 2013, Chernov became the President of the Ukrainian Association of Professional Photographers (UAPF). Chernov's installation art project Peeking in Windows – placing enlarged old photographs into windows of abandoned buildings – gained the attention of the national press and was repeated in subsequent years. In 2013, Chernov participated in Unframe, an international documentary photography project.

Samples of Chernov's 2005–2013 photographs

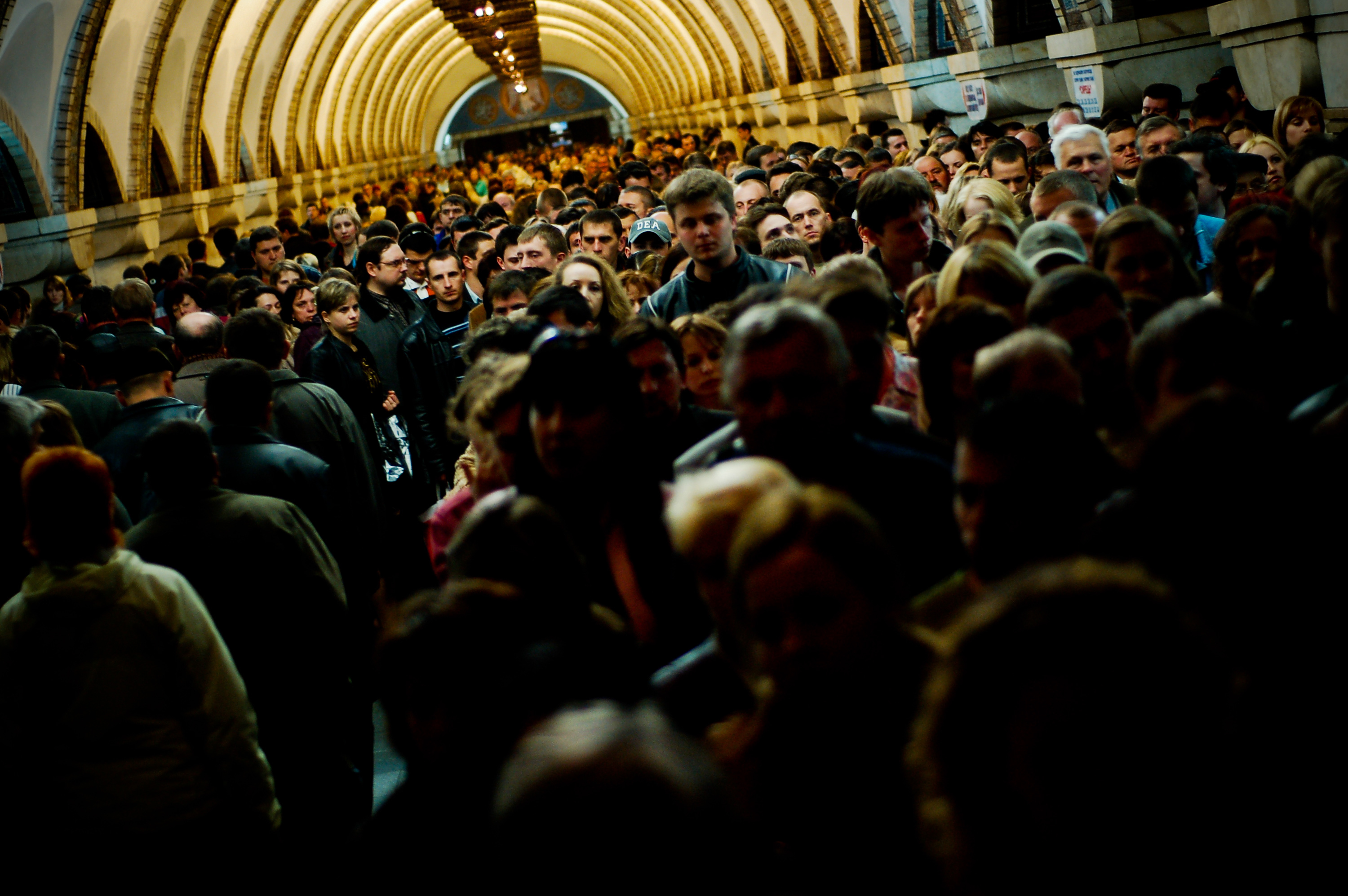
Zoloti Vorota subway station, Kyiv, 2007

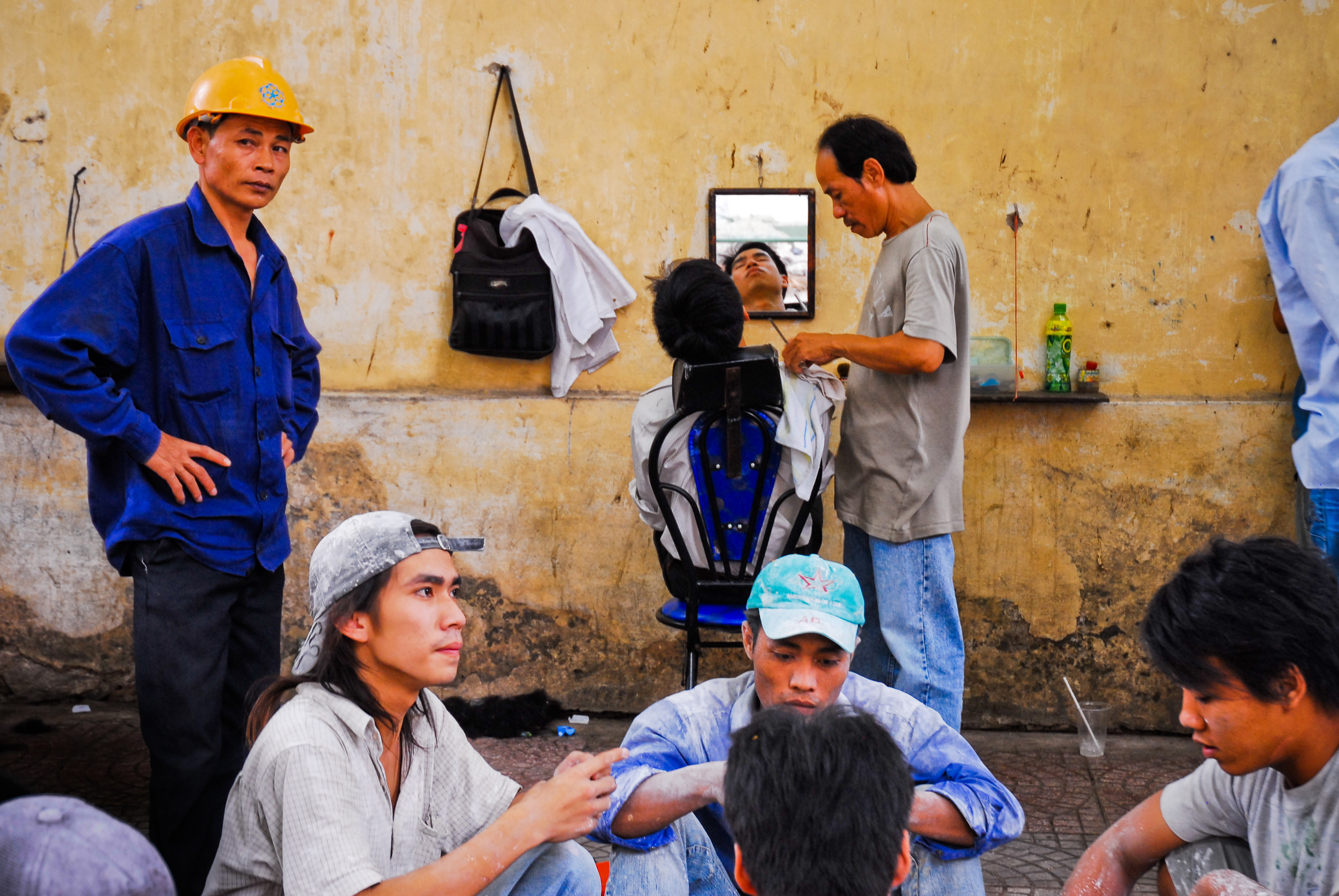
Street barber, Ho Chi Minh City, Vietnam, 2009

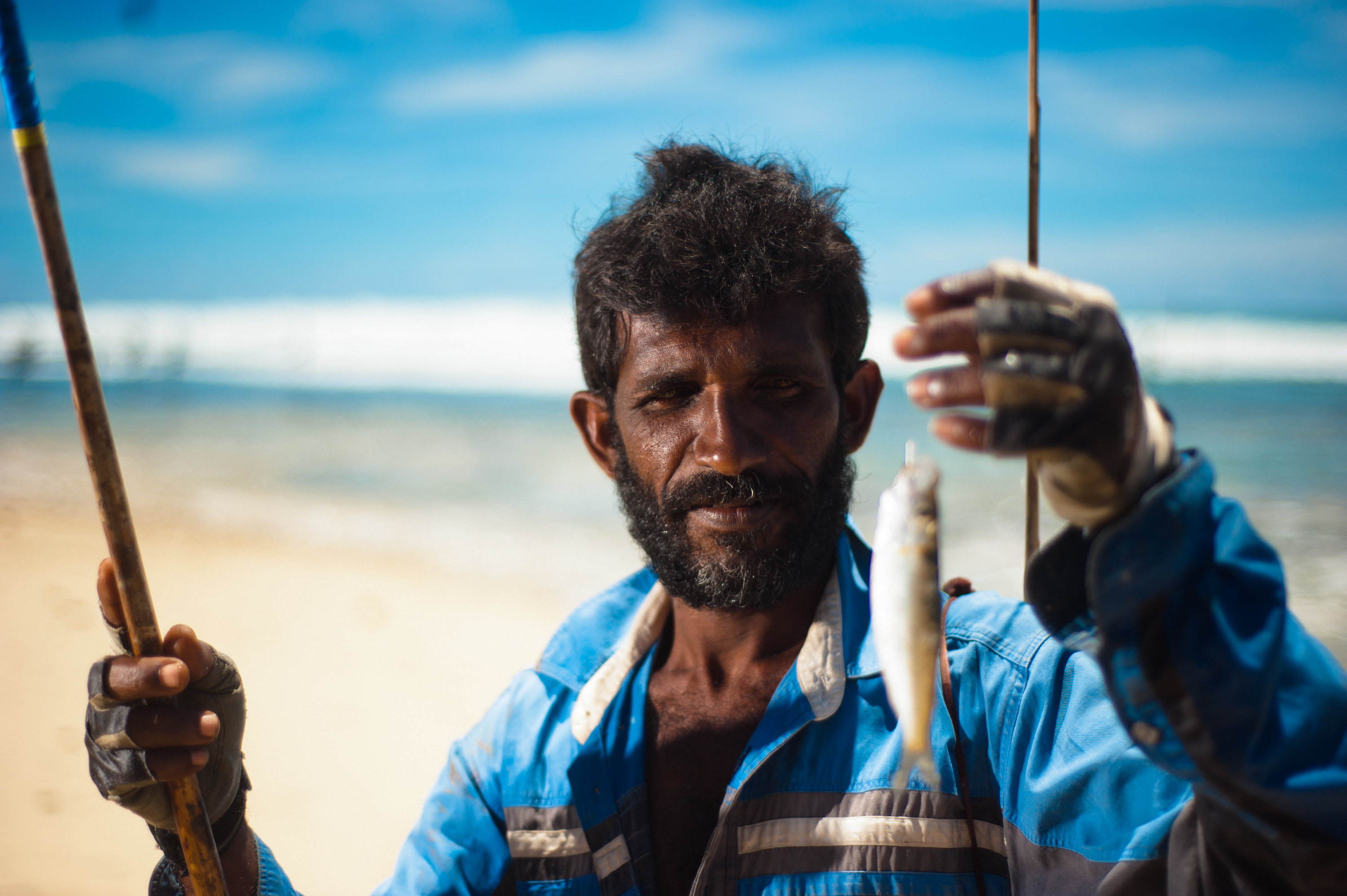
Sri Lankan fisherman, 2011

=== Journalism ===
In the summer of 2013, while photographing in Istanbul, Turkey, Chernov found himself in the middle of Gezi Park protests. The night violence triggered a shift from fine-art photography and documentary photography to conflict and war reporting.

Chernov's photographs of Gezi Park Protests, Istanbul, 2013

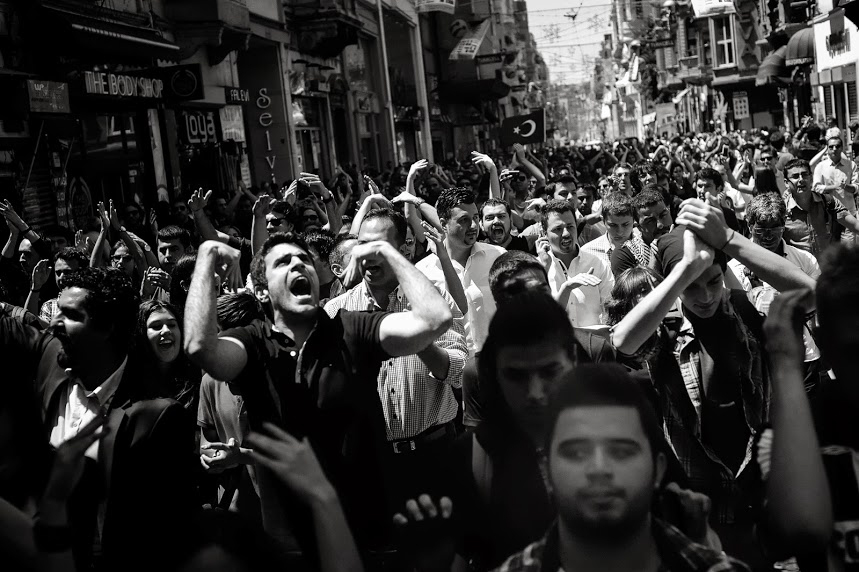
June 3, 2013

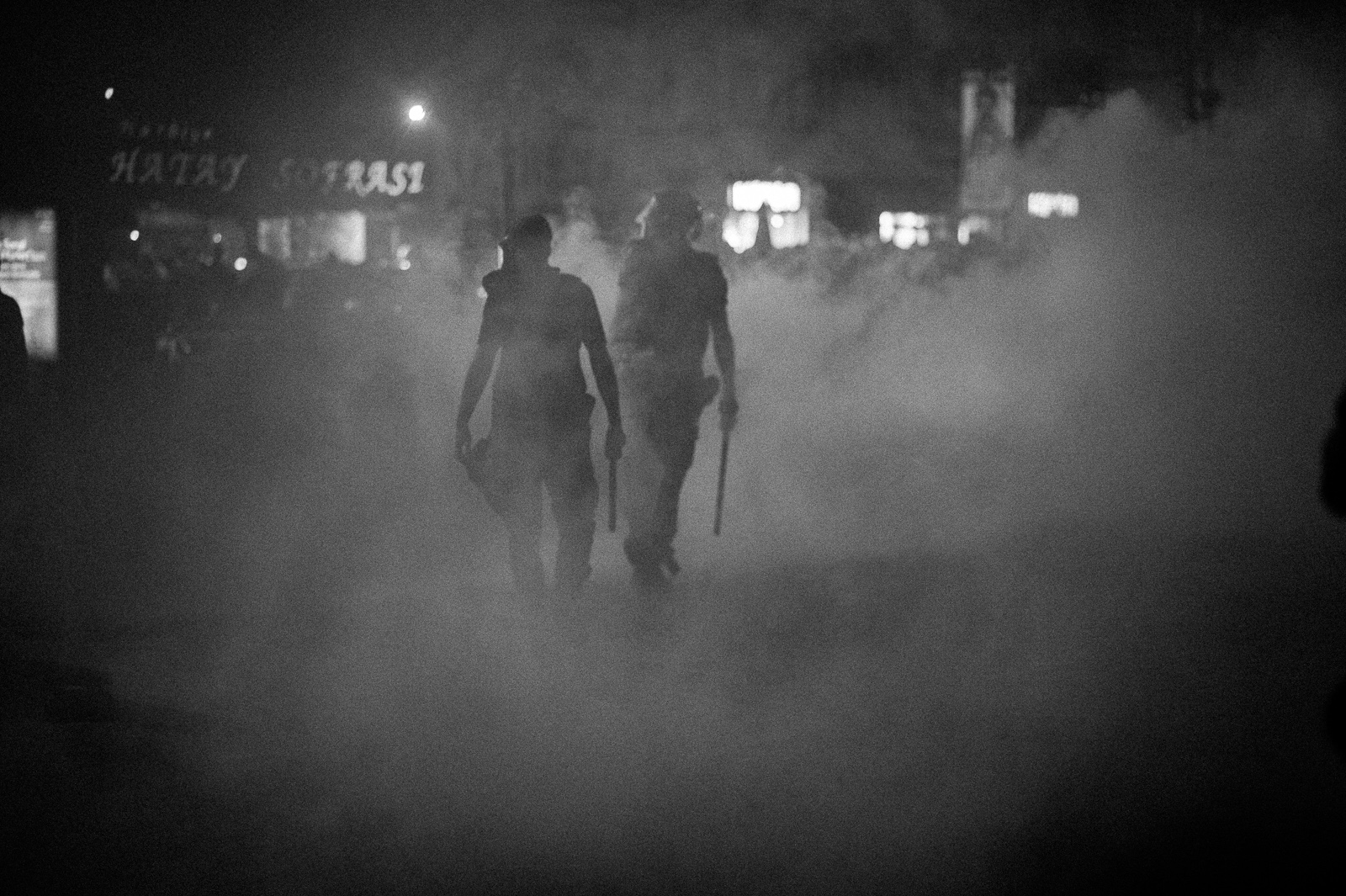
June 15, 2013

==== Euromaidan ====
In late 2013 in Ukraine's capital Kyiv, Chernov photographed the mass protests of Euromaidan as a MediaPort and Unframe correspondent. He was attacked and wounded several times. In December 2013, pro-Yanukovych police injured Chernov's hand with a baton, tore up his press credentials, and destroyed his photography equipment. In January 2014, ignoring Chernov's insignia that identified him as a member of the press, a pro-Yanukovych policeman threw a stun grenade into Chernov, injuring his legs and eye with shrapnel.

Many international reporters flocked to cover the Ukrainian Revolution which later transitioned into the annexation of Crimea and War in Donbas. Chernov provided the international reporters with local assistance, also starting as a translator and a stringer for Associated Press. Chernov's background in photography and his partnership with other reporters allowed him to polish his video filming skills and become a regular freelancer for Associated Press in May 2014.

Chernov's photographs of Euromaidan, 2013–2014

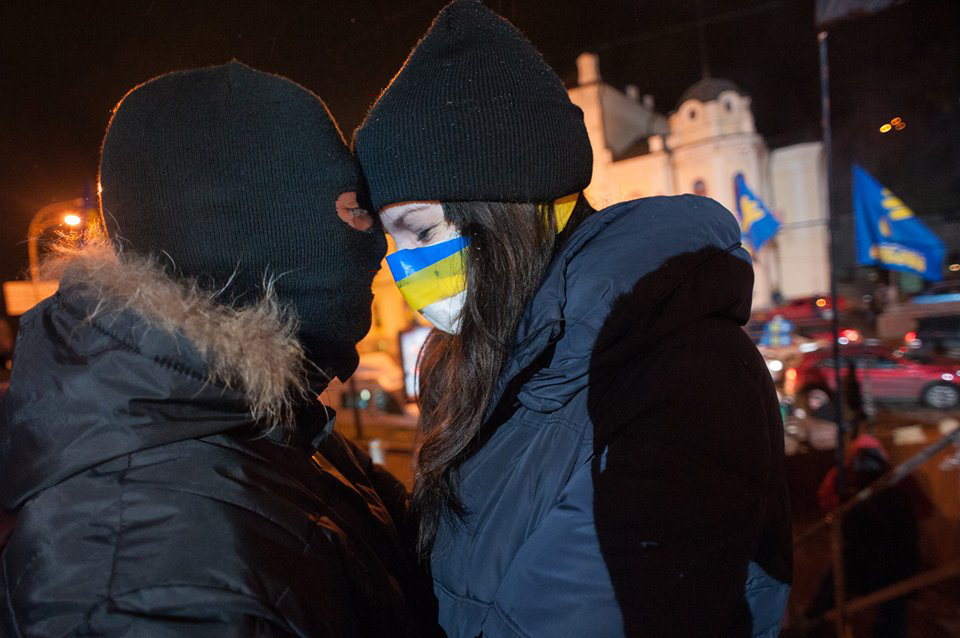
Protesters, November 30, 2013

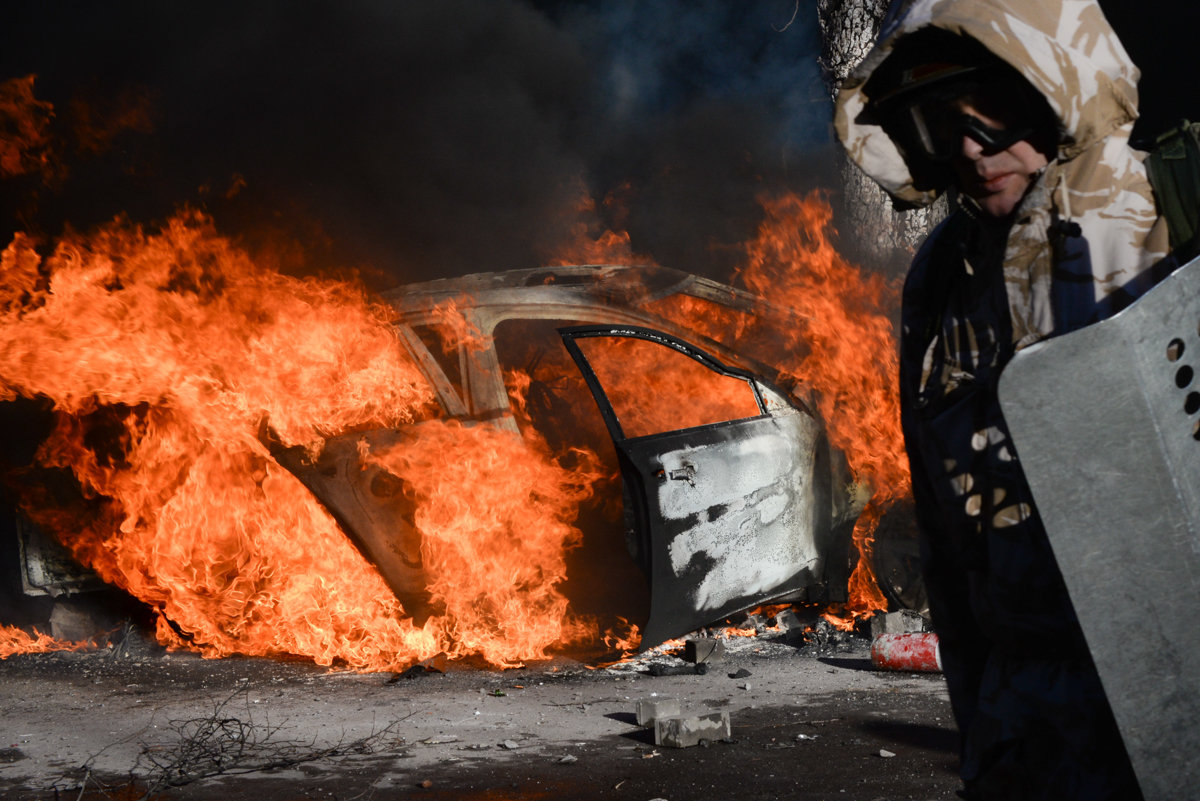
February 18, 2014

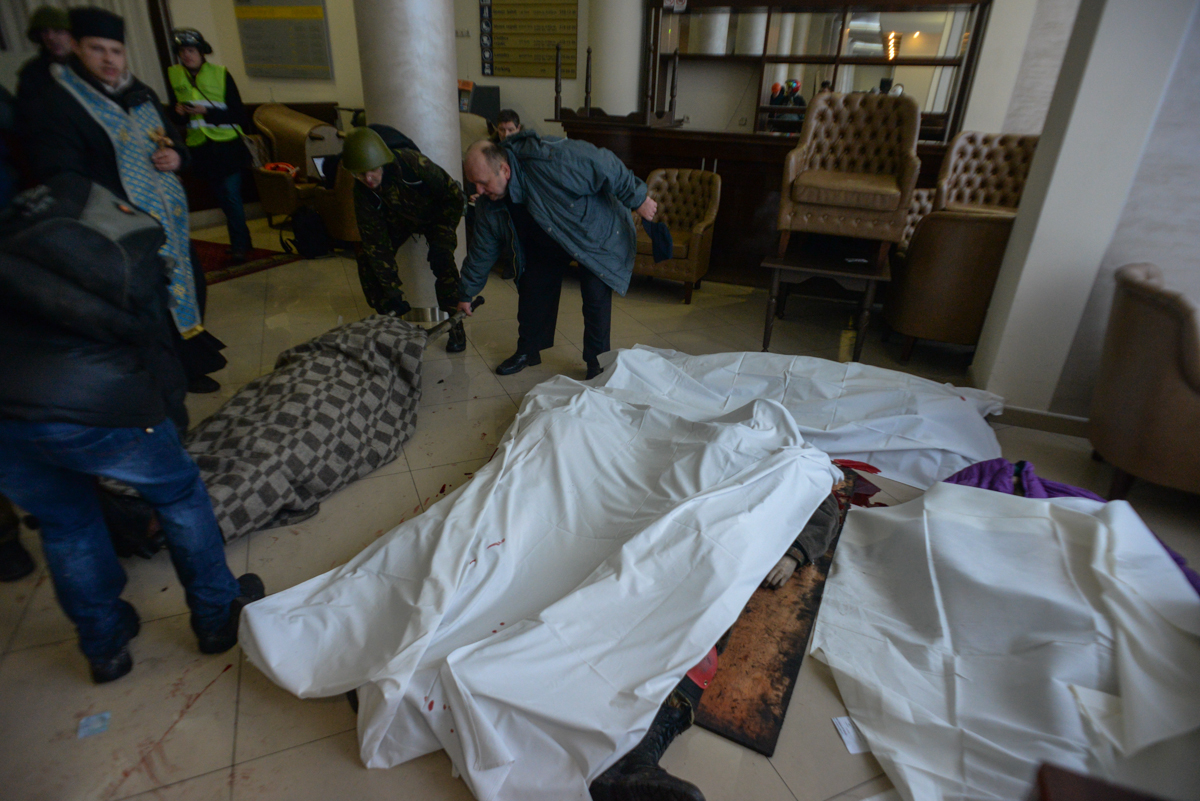
Bodies of protesters, February 20, 2014

==== Career with Associated Press ====
By July 2014, Chernov already worked as an independent multi-format (text, photo, and video) journalist for Associated Press. Russian military intervention to Donbas had created another conflict zone in Ukraine, and Chernov covered War in Donbas in 2014, becoming one of very few journalists who reported the conflict from both sides. He was the first journalist to publish video footage from the scene after the downing of Malaysia Airlines Flight 17.

On his third day working as an independent AP journalist, Malaysia Airlines Flight 17 was shot down in the area, and Chernov provided the first images of the incident. His reporting played an essential role in the AP's coverage of the event. For his coverage of the event, Chernov was awarded the "Young Talent of the Year" Award by Royal Television Society.

In subsequent years as an AP journalist and war correspondent, Chernov covered the war in Syria and the Battle of Mosul in Iraq as well as the 2015 European migrant crisis in Greece, Macedonia, Slovenia, Croatia, Hungary, Austria, and Germany. In 2017, in Mosul, a sniper bullet pierced Chernov's camera and stuck in his ballistic vest. Chernov's Iraqi videos were finalist entries for the Rory Peck Award in 2017 and for Royal Television Society awards in 2017 and 2018.

Chernov's reports were published worldwide, including being picked up by The Independent, The Seattle Times, Military Times, Navy Times, and Washington Examiner. Chernov's photographs were also published in The New York Times, The Washington Post, The Wall Street Journal, Forbes, The Guardian, Daily Telegraph, Daily Mail, Le Monde, Deutsche Welle, Die Zeit, and his videos were aired on BBC, Euronews, CNN, Fox News, Sky News, Al Jazeera. In 2016, a Royal Television Society judge commented that "given the range, volume, and global distribution of [Chernov's] footage, there may have been days last year when we watched [Chernov's reporting] all day."

In the spring of 2020, Chernov worked in Libya, Syria, covering the migration crisis in Turkey. From May to July and from September to October, he filmed the course of the COVID-19 pandemic in Ukraine.

In August 2020, Chernov worked in Belarus, covering the presidential elections. After the announcement that Lukashenko was the winner of the elections, large-scale protests began. In Minsk, Chernov was captured and beaten by Belarusian law enforcement officers. He lost consciousness after being beaten in a police van and regained consciousness in an ambulance. During protests Chernov recorded the moment when a man in a bloody shirt fell to the ground. Later it was established that this protester was Oleksandr Taraikovsky. Chernov's photo and video became incontrovertible evidence that Taraikovsky was shot at point-blank range by members of the special forces on August 10, 2020 in Minsk, while government media tried to portray the incident as something that happened due to the carelessness of a protester. After that, Chernov was deported from the country, and his accreditation was not extended.

During 2020 and 2021, he also worked in Nagorno-Karabakh, Afghanistan, Lithuania, and Armenia.

In February and March 2022, during the Russian invasion of Ukraine, Chernov and the freelancer Evgeniy Maloletka, working for AP, stayed in Mariupol, which was encircled by Russian troops, under siege, and extensively bombed, whereas the Russian Ministry of Foreign Affairs and the Defense Ministry claimed that Russia only targets military installations. Chernov and Maloletka were among the few journalists, and, according to the AP, the only international journalists in Mariupol during that period, and their photographs were used by Western media to cover the situation. According to Chernov, on 11 March they were in a hospital taking photos when they were taken of the city with the assistance of Ukrainian soldiers. They managed to escape from Mariupol unharmed. On 23 May 2022 Chernov, together with Maloletka and Vasilisa Stepanenko, received the Knight International Journalism Award for their work in Mariupol. At the end of 2022 he was included in the nationwide Ukrainian ratings "People of the HB 2022 in the year of war" and "14 songs, photos and art objects that became symbols of Ukrainian resistance" by Forbes Ukraine. Chernov became an individual laureate of the 2026 Open Society Prize.

Samples of Chernov's documentary photographs, 2015–2016

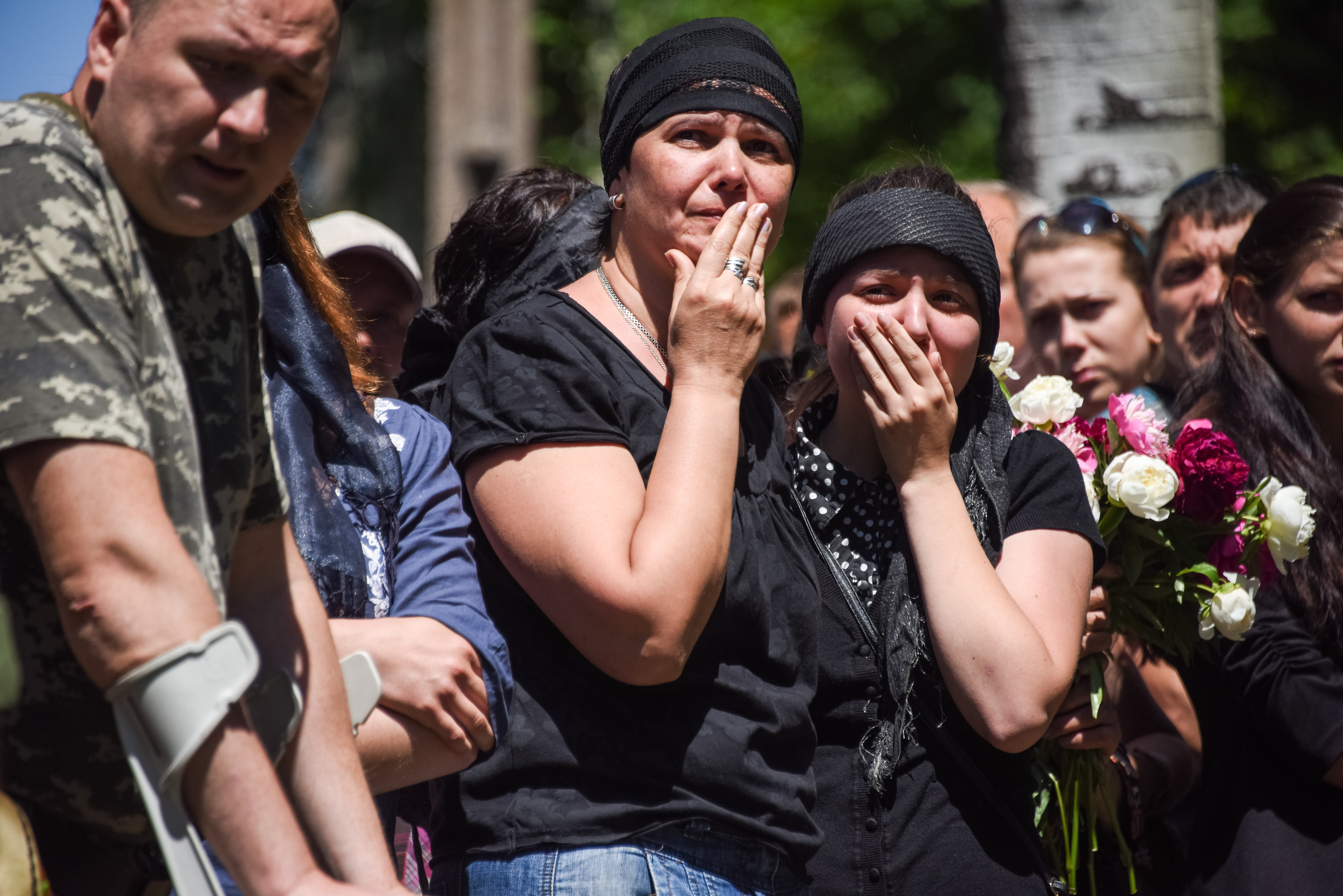
Mourning of fighters, Donetsk, Ukraine, June 2015

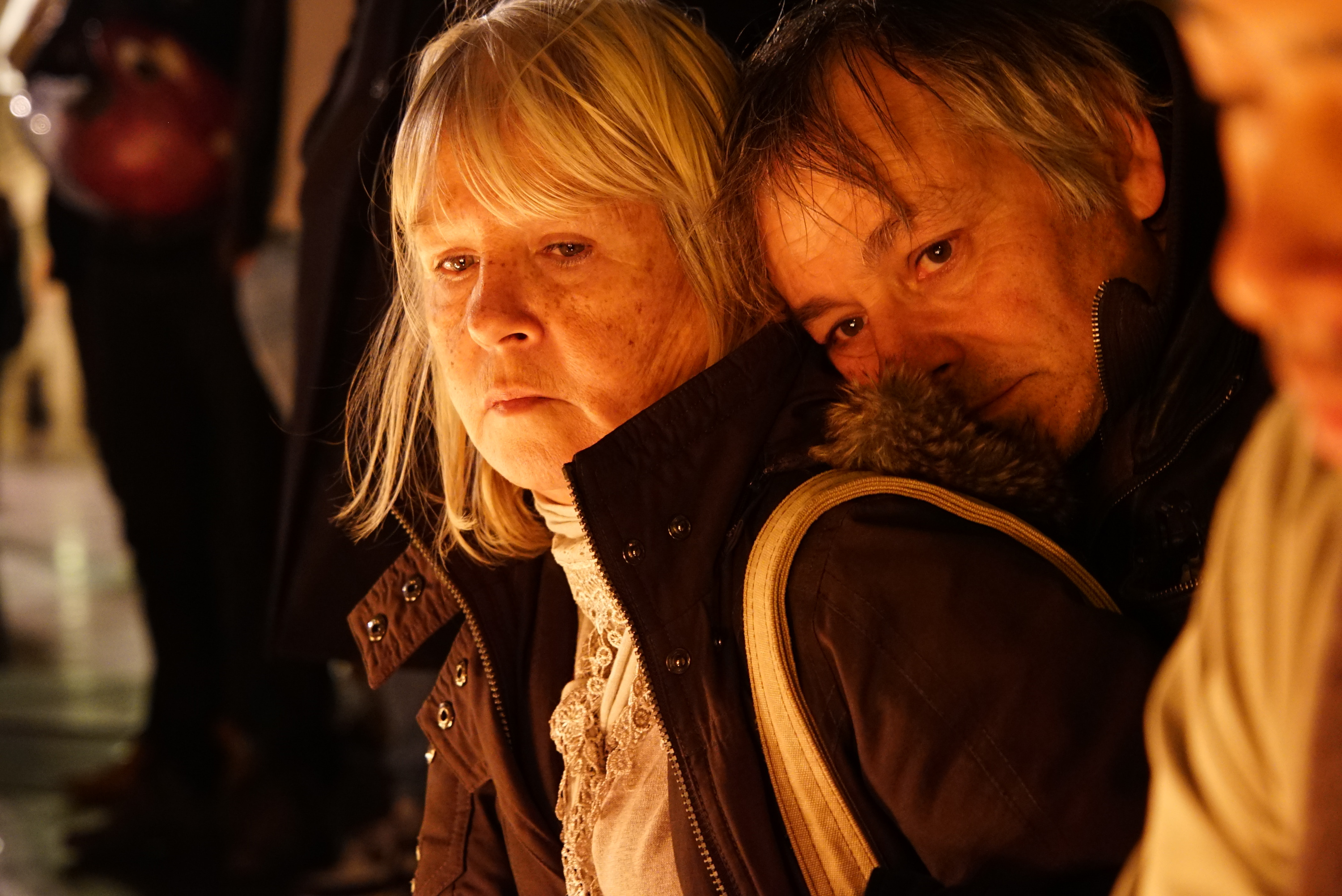
The aftermath of Paris Terrorist Attacks, November 2015

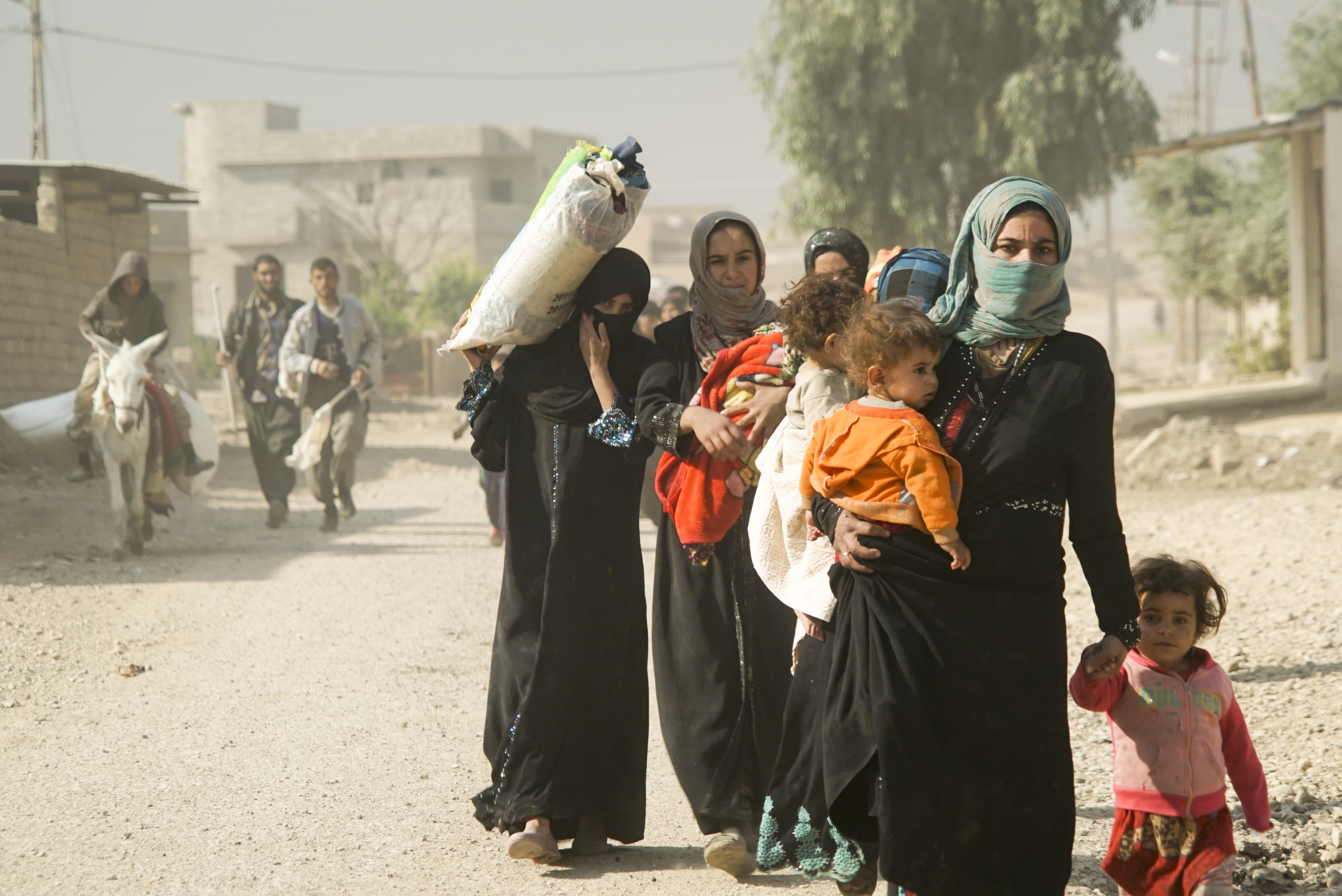
Mosul, Iraq, November 2016

== Career in documentary filmmaking ==
In 2024, Chernov became a member of the jury for the ImpACT Award at the 81st Venice International Film Festival. Chernov chaired the jury for the Golden Eye (L'Œil d'or) Award for Best Documentary at the 2026 Cannes Film Festival.

=== 20 Days in Mariupol ===
In Mariupol Chernov collected footage with field producer Vasilisa Stepanenko and cameraman Evgeniy Maloletka. After escaping the siege together with the team of Frontline (PBS channel) he made the documentary 20 Days in Mariupol. The film was included in the competition of Sundance Film Festival in the World Cinema Documentary Competition category. The film's world premiere took place at the festival in January 2023. The film won the Audience Award in World Cinema Documentary category. On review aggregator website Rotten Tomatoes the film has an approval rating of 100%.

In 2023, 20 Days in Mariupol received the Cinema for Peace award as the best documentary of the year, and the Standing Up award at Cleveland International Film Festival. The Ukrainian premiere took place at the Docudays UA festival and the film took the main award. At the New Zealand documentary film festival Doc Edge, 20 Days in Mariupol was awarded in two nominations: Best Director (Mstyslav Chernov) and Best Editing (Michelle Mizner). Later, the film received The Tim Hetherington Award at Sheffield DocFest.

The film was released in selected theaters in the US on July 14, 2023 and is scheduled for a Ukraine public release from August 31. Pre-premiere screenings took place in Kyiv (Bouquet Kyiv Stage 2023 festival) and Lviv (NGO "Lviv Media Forum"). On the first weekend of September 2023, the film collected more than 530 thousand hryvnias at the Ukrainian box office, becoming the highest-grossing Ukrainian documentary in history.

The Ukrainian Oscar Committee nominated "20 Days in Mariupol" from Ukraine for the 96th Academy Awards in the category "Best International Feature Film". Film won BAFTA Film Awards in "Best Documentary' category and was nominated in "Film not in the English language" category Film was included in long-lists of Academy Awards and later won the Best Documentary Feature Film category.

The film won two nominations for the Kinokolo National Film Award (Best Documentary and Discovery of the Year). The film was ranked as one of the top three documentaries of 2023 by IndieWire. Film received Directors Guild of America Awards for Outstanding Directorial Achievement in Documentary. Later film won as Best Film and Best Documentary at Ukrainian National Film Academy Award Golden Dzyga.

In October 2023, the film was to be shown at the Serbian Beldocs festival at the Lazarevac Cultural Center in the suburbs of Belgrade. On October 10, the Serbian Radical Party called for the cancellation of the screening of the "anti-Russian propaganda film of the Kyiv regime" which is "an attempt by the West to change the attitude of the Serbian people towards brotherly Russia". On October 12, the festival administration canceled the screening, stressing that "Beldocs is not behind this decision and did not participate in it".

=== 2000 Meters to Andriivka ===
Chernov re-teamed with Associated Press and Frontline for 2000 Meters to Andriivka focusing on a Ukrainian counteroffensive as they recapture Russian-occupied Andriivka. Filming began in September 2023 and focused on soldiers of the 3rd Assault Brigade fighting near Bakhmut. The project reunited Chernov with photographer Oleksandr Babenko, editor Michelle Mizner, and producer Rainey Aronson-Rath. The film's score was composed by Grammy Award winner Sam Slater, known for his work on "Chernobyl" and "Joker". It had its world premiere at the 2025 Sundance Film Festival on 23 January 2025. Film won Directing Award: World Cinema Documentary.

The film was also selected to the 2025 Cannes Film Festival. "2000 Meters to Andriivka" was shown at the IDFA (Netherlands), won the audience award at Millennium Docs Against Gravity in Poland, was presented at the Sheffield DocFest and the International Documentary Film Festival Amsterdam. At the gala closing of the 10th Ukraina! Festiwal Filmowy in Warsaw, the film received the Audience Choice Award in the documentary category. The Ukrainian Film Week in Prague opened with the screening of the documentary 2000 Meters to Andriyivka. It was included in the "Horizons" program of the 59th Karlovy Vary International Film Festival. It won at the DocAviv International Documentary Film Festival. It also won the audience award at Millennium Docs Against Gravity, at the Transilvania International Film Festival (TIFF.24), at the Mykolaychuk OPEN. It also had a special screening at the 20th Rome Film Festival in October 2025.

The film will represent Ukraine in the category "Academy Award for Best Documentary Feature" at the 98th Academy Awards. and was longlisted for the award in Academy Award for Best International Feature Film nomination and shortlisted in Academy Award for Best Documentary Feature nomination. The film was nominated in the category of "Best Documentary Feature" at the Gotham Awards 2025. At the National Film Critics' Award "Kinokolo" the film won in the category "Best Feature Documentary", and Chernov himself won in the nomination "Best Director". The film won the News & Documentary Emmy Awards for Outstanding Direction: Documentary and was nominated in five other categories. Film was nominated for the BAFTA in Best Documentary category. Chernov himself also won the Writers Guild of America Award in the Documentary Screenplay category and duPont–Columbia Award. Together with cinematographer Alex Babenko, Chernov received the George Polk Award in the Foreign Television Reporting category and the ASC Award in the Documentary category. The film was nominated for 4 national film awards «Golden Dzyga», winning two of them: Best Documentary and Best Cinematography.

== Chernov's style ==
Outside observers note Chernov's deep compassion to humanity that makes his imagery influential. They also note the vast spectrum of his creative work and his "exceptional eye for detail."

A Ukrainian photographer and a photography exhibition curator in Kharkiv, Volodymyr Ohloblin, commented on Chernov's work: "Mstyslav has exceptionally deep vision [sic] it's obvious that he feels for the people on his photographs. Mstyslav has a good intuition, a rare gift, how to convey in photographs what he sees."

The Director of the European news section of Associated Press, Caro Kriel, said: "Through his involvement in some critical stories, Chernov has quickly proved himself to be a rare, multiformat journalist with an uncanny ability to develop a story in the most difficult conditions. He is a natural visual storyteller and his signature trait – compassion for humanity that suffuses almost every image – has ensured that his work has had an immediate impact."

A judge of Royal Television Society Awards commented that "[Chernov] has an exceptional eye for detail and a full range of shots across his portfolio, capturing emotion and conveying the fear and sometimes panic that was at the heart of so many news events last year."

Chernov prefers to work "light," carrying simpler, smaller equipment, that could always be on him and ready to shoot at all times. He works with small cameras and usually doesn't use a tripod.

== Writing ==
In January 2020, Chernov presented his psychological novel Dreamtime (Ukrainian: Часи сновидінь), a 500-page fiction conceived and written over an 8-year period. Alluding to aboriginal Dreamtime, the novel examines societies' collective experiences ("dreams") with war and conflict and is loosely based on real events that Chernov witnessed during the war in Donbas, the Migration crisis in Europe and others. It features four intertwined plot lines that span across vast geography from Eastern Ukraine to Southern Europe, then to Southeast Asia, yet united by a common theme of internal conflict resolution. The novel was launched in Kyiv as a focal point of a video art exhibition devoted to the role of media in creating public collective experiences. The novel was credited for its creative literary application of dreams to showcase protagonists' psyches and for its "serious" and "masterly prose". The novel was included in the TOP books of 2020 by volunteers, writers and military journalists about the Russian-Ukrainian war according to "Army FM".

Literary expert and critic Tetyana Trofymenko believes that The Dreamtime is unexpectedly strong and stylistically formed prose for a debutant. Journalist and critic Yuryi Volodarsky called the novel the first large-scale literary text in Ukrainian literature in which the war in Donbas is shown from the other side of the front. "A novel for a debut is surprisingly bright, but in so many moments it is uncomfortable that it is better to ignore it. "The Dreamtime" is devoid of both the author's evaluative judgments and the transmission of "correct" views from the mouths of the characters. Chernov is first and foremost a humanist, this is evident in his prose no less than in photos from hot spots".

On September 26, 2023, Mstislav Chernov stated that the publishing house "Samit-knyga" had not paid him a fee two years after the publication of the novel and refused to report on the sale of the book. The publishing house apologized and sent reports. Chernov forbade the publishing house to further use his name and book for advertising.

== Publications ==
=== Fiction by Chernov ===
- Часи сновидінь = Dreamtime (2020)
  - The Dreamtime. Cherry Orchard, 2022. ISBN 978-1644699881. In English.

=== Photography books with contributions by Chernov ===
- Незалежні = Independents. Ваш автограф, 2022. 144 pictures taken by 60 Ukrainian photographers over 30 years. With text by Mstyslav Chernov. Edited by Mykhailo Palinchak.

== Filmography ==
- 20 Days in Mariupol (2023)
- 2000 Meters to Andriivka (2025)

== Awards ==
Year	Award	Category	Result	Ref.
2026	Alfred I. duPont–Columbia University Award		Won	
2026	News and Documentary Emmy Awards	Outstanding Direction: Documentary	Won	
2026	Writers Guild of America Awards	Documentary Screenplay	Won	
2025	2025 Sundance Film Festival	Directing Award: World Cinema Documentary	Won	
2025	CPH:DOX	F: ACT Award	Won	
2024	International Broadcasting Convention Award	International Honour for Excellence	Won	
2024	96th Academy Awards	Best Documentary Feature Film (shared with Michelle Mizner and Raney Aronson-Rath)	Won	
2024	Shevchenko National Prize	(shared with Evgeniy Maloletka and Vasilisa Stepanenko)	Won	
2024	Alfred I. duPont–Columbia University Award		Won	
2024	Directors Guild of America	Outstanding Directorial Achievement in Documentary	Won	
2023	Doc Edge (documentary film festival)	Best International Director	Won	
2023	Pulitzer Prize	Pulitzer Prize for Public Service (shared with Evgeniy Maloletka, Vasilisa Stepanenko, and Lori Hinnant)	Won	
2023	Overseas Press Club Awards	Hal Boyle Award (Best newspaper, news service or digital reporting from abroad)	Won	
2023	Royal Television Society Television Journalism Awards	Camera Operator of the Year	Won	
2023	George Polk Awards	Award for War Reporting	Won	
2023	Philip Meyer Journalism Award	(as the member of The Associated Press and PBS Frontline team)	Won	
2023	CJFE International Press Freedom Award		Won	
2022	Ukrainska Pravda Award	Journalist of the Year	Won	
2022	Reporters Without Borders Press Freedom Prize	Prize for Impact	Won	
2022	Oliver S. Gramling Awards	Journalism Awards (with Evgeniy Maloletka and Vasilisa Stepanenko)	Won	
2022	27th International Festival of Reportage and Media (Serbia)	Photo report	Won	
2022	Free Media Awards		Won	
2022	Elijah Parish Lovejoy Award for Courage in Journalism		Won	
2022	Bayeux Calvados-Normandy Award	Video Image Trophy	Won	
2022	Bayeux Calvados-Normandy Award	Television Trophy	2	
2022	Knight International Journalism Award		Won	
2022	Royal Television Society Award	Coverage of international events	Nominated	
2022	Royal Television Society Award	Camera Operator of the Year	Nominated	
2022	Deutsche Welle Freedom of Speech Award		Won	
2022	Премія імені Георгія Ґонґадзе		Won	
2022	Biagio Agnes Award	International Prize	Won	
2020	Royal Television Society Award	Camera Operator of the Year	Nominated	
2019	APME: Powerful Stories	Use of video	1	
2019	Livingston Award	International Reporting	Finalist	
2018	Royal Television Society Award	Camera Operator of the Year	Nominated	
2017	Royal Television Society Award	Camera Operator of the Year	Nominated	
2017	Rory Peck Award		Finalist	
2016	Royal Television Society Award	Camera Operator of the Year	Won	
2015	Ukrainian photographer of the year (2014)	Reportage	1	
2015	Royal Television Society Award	Young Talent of the Year	Won	
2014	Ukrainian photographer of the year (2013)	Reportage	1	
2014	Humanity Photo Award (HPA) (2013)		Finalist	
2013	Pentax Awards, Ukraine		Won	
2013	PRESSzvanie Awards, Ukraine	Portrait	Won	
2013	International FIPP FREMANTLE Portrait Photography Contest, Australia	Portrait	Finalist	
2013	Ukrainian photographer of the year (2012)	Documentary photography	2	
2013	Panasonic Photo Contest, Ukraine		Won	
2009	Almost disappearing Kharkiv, Kharkiv, Ukraine		1	
2008	Kharkiv through the eyes of its inhabitants, Kharkiv, Ukraine		1	

== Exhibitions ==
Year	Name	Location	Ref.
2024	Mariupol	Toronto (Canada)	
2022	Ukraine: The Path to Freedom	Groningen (Netherlands)	
2022	MARIUPOL: Photographs & Video by Evgeniy Maloletka and Mstyslav Chernov	New York (USA)	
2022	Ukraine, testify so you will not forget	Saguenay (Canada)	
2022	Obležení Mariupolu, poslední novináři v okupovaném městě	Prague (Czech Republic)	
2022	Spalah. Today's Ukrainian photography	Kyiv (Ukraine)	
2022	Mariupol, Ukraine	Perpignan (France)	
2022	Escape from Mariupol	Rome (Italy)	
2022	Обличчя війни	Cologne (Germany)	
2022	Дім воєнних злочинів Росії (Russian War Crimes)	Davos (Switzerland), Kyiv (Ukraine), Brussels (Belgium), New York City (USA), London (United Kingdom)	
2022	Tragedy of the 21st century in the centre of Europe	Nicosia, Sotira, Larnaca (Cyprus)	
2022	Ukraine Now: Darkness vs Light. Children Dream about Peace	New Delhi (India)	
2022	#StandWithUkraine. The Russian war of aggression against Ukraine: lives taken, destroyed cities, lost fortunes	Strasbourg (France)	
2022	Українська Герніка	Tbilisi (Georgia)	
2022	Это приказ, SORRI	Mainz (Germany)	
2022	The Captured House	Berlin (Germany), Rome (Italy), Amsterdam (Netherlands)	
2022	Ціна свободи	Helsinki (Finland)	
2022	Маріуполь	Sarajevo (Bosnia and Herzegovina)	
2020	Сплячий будинок	Kyiv (Ukraine)	
2020	Production of Dreams, or What the Modern Media Machine Offers	Kyiv (Ukraine) (with Igor Chekachkov)	
2019	The Ukrainian Revolution	Khmelnytskyi (Ukraine)	
2017	Ukraine on Fire	Düsseldorf (Germany)	
2015	Maidan – Valor, Will and Pain	Kharkiv (Ukraine)	
2015	I'm a Volunteer at Heart	Sumy (Ukraine)	
2014	Red, International Red Cross	Kyiv (Ukraine)	
2013	Euromaidan: freedom territory	Riga (Latvia)	
2013	Cambodia: season of rain	Kharkiv (Ukraine)	
2008	Musica per Somnia	Kyiv (Ukraine)	

== See also ==
- Serhii Korovayny

== Literature cited ==
- Sellers-Earl, Laura (June 19, 2019), Koetting, Tom (ed.), "2019 APME awards honor AP journalists for powerful stories", APME:Associated Press Media Editors, New York City: APME Foundation, archived from the original on June 27, 2019
- Zharenov, Jaroslav (July 29, 2015), Aleksandr, Shvec [in Ukrainian] (ed.), "V zabroshennom zdanii na Jaroslavovom Valu pojavilas' vystavka starinnyh fotografij" В заброшенном здании на Ярославовом Валу появилась выставка старинных фотографий [An exhibition of old photographs appeared in an abandoned building on Yaroslavovo Val], Fakty i kommentarii Факты и комментарии [Facts and comments] (in Russian), no. 136 (4354), Kyiv: Bothain Consulting, ISSN 1606-5557, OCLC 1127159341
- Kuz'mіn, Dmitro, ed. (April 23, 2013), "PRESSzvanie: nazvanі іmena krashhih fotoreporterіv" PRESSзвание: названі імена кращих фоторепортерів [PRESScalling: The names of the best photojournalists are named], Ukraїns'kі Novini Українські Новини [Ukrainian news] (in Ukrainian), Ukrainian News Agency
- Dikan', Filipp (March 15, 2013), Fedorkova, Tat'jana (ed.), ""Sezon dozhdej" – fotovystavka bez avtora" "Сезон дождей" – фотовыставка без автора ["Rainy Season" – photo exhibition without an author], MediaPort (in Russian), Kharkiv
- Kornienko, Mihail (December 4, 2013), Efimenko, Nikolaj (ed.), "K chemu spory? Ukraina uzhe v Evrope" К чему споры? Украина уже в Европе [Why argue? Ukraine is already in Europe], From-UA: Novosti Ukrainy From-UA: Новости Украины [From-UA: Ukraine News] (in Ukrainian), Kyiv: From-UA
- Kostenko, Tatyana, ed. (January 27, 2014), "Na ulice Grushevskogo v Kieve zhurnalisty provodjat akciju protesta" На улице Грушевского в Киеве журналисты проводят акцию протеста [On the Grushevsky street in Kiev, journalists hold a protest], Vecherniy Kharkov Вечерний Харьков [Evening Kharkov] (in Russian), Kharkiv: ТОВ "Редакція газети 'Вечірній Харків'", OCLC 762014020
- Imregi, Laura (February 19, 2015), Buzbee, Sally (ed.), AP's Mstyslav Chernov named young talent of the year at RTS Television Journalism Awards, New York City: The Associated Press, OCLC 464378787 – via Associated Press
- Riley, Melissa (May 2, 2019), Holdship, Deborah (ed.), "University of Michigan announces 2019 Livingston Award finalists", University of Michigan News, Ann Arbor: University of Michigan
- Gordіenko, Tetjana (May 7, 2018), Ligachova, Natalіja (ed.), "Voennij reporter Associated Press: Bezpeka — ce zavzhdi kompromіs, іz soboju ta z redaktorom u tomu chislі" Воєнний репортер Associated Press: Безпека — це завжди компроміс, із собою та з редактором у тому числі [Associated Press War Reporter: Security is always a compromise, myself and the editor including], MediaSapiens (in Ukrainian), Kyiv: Детектор медіа
- Fedorkova, Tat'jana, ed. (January 22, 2014), "Prjamoe popadanie" Прямое попадание [Direct hit], MediaPort (in Russian), Kharkiv
- Clarke, Steve, ed. (February 18, 2015), "RTS Television Journalism Awards 2015: The Winners", Television: Royal Television Society, London: Royal Television Society, ISSN 0308-454X, LCCN 85647402
- Clarke, Steve, ed. (March 1, 2017), "Television Journalism Awards 2017", Television: Royal Television Society, London: Royal Television Society, ISSN 0308-454X, LCCN 85647402
- Clarke, Steve, ed. (February 28, 2018), "Television Journalism Awards 2018 sponsored by Guestbooker", Television: Royal Television Society, London: Royal Television Society, ISSN 0308-454X, LCCN 85647402
- Clarke, Steve, ed. (February 17, 2016), "Television Journalism Awards 2016", Television: Royal Television Society, London: Royal Television Society, ISSN 0308-454X, LCCN 85647402
- "Chernov Mstyslav", ukrainianphotographers.com (in Ukrainian), Kyiv: UAPF, 2019
- Meshherjakova, Ekaterina (May 20, 2018), Gordejchik, Evgenij (ed.), ""Esli bezopasnosti net, patriotizm nikogo ne volnuet". Voennyj fotograf — o rabote v Sirii, Irake i na Donbasse" "Если безопасности нет, патриотизм никого не волнует". Военный фотограф — о работе в Сирии, Ираке и на Донбассе ["If there is no security, patriotism does not bother anyone. A war photographer — about work in Syria, Iraq, and the Donbass], Focus ФОКУС [Focus] (in Russian), Kyiv: Ukrainian Media Holding
- Gorchins'ka, Oleksandra (December 27, 2013), Ruban, Volodimir [in Ukrainian] (ed.), "U Kievі zapustili fotoproekt "Zazirajuchi u vіkna"" У Києві запустили фотопроект "Зазираючи у вікна" [Kyiv begins A photography project "Peeking in Windows" launched in Kiev], Gazeta.ua (in Ukrainian), Kyiv: Нова інформація
- Gasidzhak, Lesja, ed. (February 19, 2019), "Vistavka fotografії Mstislava Chernova "Ukraїns'ka revoljucіja" u Hmel'nic'komu muzeї-studії fotomistectva" Виставка фотографії Мстислава Чернова "Українська революція" у Хмельницькому музеї-студії фотомистецтва [Mstislav Chernov's photo exhibition "The Ukrainian Revolution" at Khmelnytsky Museum of Art], Muzejnij prostіr Музейний простір [Museum Space] (in Ukrainian), Kyiv: Український центр розвитку музейної справи
- "Ukraine In Flammen" [Ukraine in flames], Kin-Top (in German), Dusseldorf: Kin-Top Förderungszentrum e.V., 2017
- "U centrі kul'turi і mistectva vіdkrilas' vistavka fotografії "Majdan – muzhnіst', volja ta bіl'"" У центрі культури і мистецтва відкрилась виставка фотографії "Майдан – мужність, воля та біль" [The exhibition of photography "Maidan – valor, will, and pain" opens at the Center of Art and Culture], Ofіcіjnij veb-sajt Harkіvs'ka oblasna derzhavna admіnіstracіja Офіційний веб-сайт Харківська обласна державна адміністрація [Official web site of Kharkiv Regional State Administration] (in Ukrainian), Kharkiv: uk:Харківська обласна державна адміністрація, February 18, 2015
- "V Har'kove projdet fotovystavka Mstislava Chernova, posvjashhennaja jugo-vostochnym aziatskim stranam" В Харькове пройдет фотовыставка Мстислава Чернова, посвященная юго-восточным азиатским странам [Kharkiv will host a photo exhibition of Mstislav Chernov, dedicated to the southeast Asian countries], Oficial'nyj sajt Har'kovskogo gorodskogo soveta, gorodskogo golovy, ispolnitel'nogo komiteta Официальный сайт Харьковского городского совета, городского головы, исполнительного комитета [Official site of Kharkiv city council, mayor, executive committee] (in Russian), Kharkiv: Харківська міська рада, March 14, 2013
- Kolesnik, Valerija (March 19, 2008), Fedorkova, Tat'jana (ed.), "Kakie ljudi snjatsja Muzyke? V Har'kove otkroetsja fotovystavka Mstislava Chernova" Какие люди снятся Музыке? В Харькове откроется фотовыставка Мстислава Чернова [What kind of people dream of music? A photo exhibition of Mstislav Chernov will open in Kharkiv], MediaPort (in Russian), Kharkiv
- Kas'janenko, Igor' (February 17, 2015), Il'chenko, Larisa (ed.), "V Sumah gostit vystavka o volontjorah Krasnogo Kresta" В Сумах гостит выставка о волонтёрах Красного Креста [Exhibition on Red Cross Volunteers Visits Sumy], Media portal ATS Медиа портал АТС [Media portal ACE] (in Russian), Sumy: Агентство Творческих Событий
- Zhuravleva, Ivika (July 26, 2015), Il'chenko, Larisa (ed.), "V oknah Kieva pojavilis' bol'shie starinnye foto" В окнах Киева появились большие старинные фото [Large old photos appeared in the windows of Kiev], Media portal ATS Медиа портал АТС [Media portal ACE] (in Russian), Sumy: Агентство Творческих Событий
- Babiuk, Oleksandr, ed. (July 2, 2015), "Mstislav Chernov. Serija fotografij "Vostochnaja Ukraina"" Мстислав Чернов. Серия фотографий "Восточная Украина" [Mstislav Chernov: "Eastern Ukraine" photo series], Portal Foto.ua (in Russian), Dnipro: Foto.ua
- Babiuk, Oleksandr, ed. (December 27, 2013), "Itogi konkursa fotoproektov ot Foto.ua i Pentax" Итоги конкурса фотопроектов от Foto.ua и Pentax [The results of photo contest from Foto.ua and Pentax], Portal Foto.ua (in Russian), Dnipro: Foto.ua
- Babiuk, Oleksandr, ed. (March 26, 2014), "Otec i doch'" Отец и дочь [Father and daughter], Portal Foto.ua (in Russian), Dnipro: Foto.ua
- Babiuk, Oleksandr, ed. (April 29, 2013), "Opredeleny imena luchshih fotoreporterov na konkurse im. V. Rozvadovskogo" Определены имена лучших фоторепортеров на конкурсе им. В. Розвадовского [The names of the best photojournalists are announced at the V. Rozvadovsky competition], Portal Foto.ua (in Russian), Dnipro: Foto.ua
- Kresan, Tanja, ed. (2014), "Fotograf goda 2013. Itogi." Фотограф года 2013. Итоги. [The Photographer of the year 2013: Results], The Photonews Post (in Russian), Kyiv
- Budini, Riccardo, ed. (May 13, 2013), "UnFrame Photographer Mstyslav Chernov awarded the PressVanie 8th", Unframe, Rome: Unframe Photographers
- Budini, Riccardo, ed. (November 11, 2013), "Cambodian Hospitals and Health Centers", Unframe, Rome: Unframe Photographers
- Budini, Riccardo, ed. (March 12, 2013), "Hearts Open", Unframe, Rome: Unframe Photographers
- Budini, Riccardo, ed. (April 18, 2015), "Mstislav Chernov", Unframe, Rome: Unframe Photographers
- Bolyuk, Oleg, ed. (March 1, 2013), "Pobediteli konkursa "Fotograf goda 2012"" Победители конкурса "Фотограф года 2012" [Winners of the contest "Photographer of the Year 2012"], AdMe.ua (in Russian), Kyiv: AdMe
- Simonenko, Anna (April 24, 2008), Shapovalova, Juliana (ed.), "Fotovystavka "Pochti poterjannyj Har'kov" rasskazhet o zabroshennyh pamjatnikah goroda" Фотовыставка "Почти потерянный Харьков" расскажет о заброшенных памятниках города [Photo exhibition "Almost lost Kharkov" will tell the story of the abandoned monuments of the city], Ob#ektiv Объектив [Lens] (in Russian), Kharkiv: Simon
- Carlson, Nicholas, ed. (February 18, 2016), "AP's Mstyslav Chernov wins Royal Television Society award", Business Insider, New York City: Insider Inc., OCLC 1001990416 – via Associated Press
- Muffoletto, Roberto (June 2, 2014), Szilágyi, Sándor (ed.), "Mstyslav Chernov", VASA, Vienna: The VASA Project
- Gurdon, Hugo, ed. (2014), "Mstyslav Chernov", Washington Examiner, Washington, DC: The Anschutz Corporation, ISSN 2641-094X, LCCN sn87062196, OCLC 962736160
- Prine, Carl, ed. (2017), "Mstyslav Chernov", Navy Times, Washington DC: Sightline Media Group, ISSN 0028-1697, LCCN 76646515, OCLC 1097091153
- Tilghman, Andrew, ed. (2017), "Mstyslav Chernov", Military Times, Springfield, VA: Sightline Media Group, ISSN 2631-990X, OCLC 751451301
- Flores, Michele Matassa, ed. (2019), "Mstyslav Chernov", The Seattle Times, Seattle: The Seattle Times Company, ISSN 0745-9696, LCCN sn83009191, OCLC 761998792
- Broughton, Christian (ed.), "Mstyslav Chernov", The Independent, London: Independent Digital News & Media Ltd, ISSN 0951-9467, OCLC 185201487
- Romanek, Neal (October 25, 2017), Butts, Tom (ed.), "Rory Peck Winners Battle for the Truth", TV Technology, Bath, Somerset: Future US, ISSN 0887-1701, LCCN sv87001113, OCLC 962546779
- Rory Peck Awards 2017, London: BBC, 2017
- Skripnik, Oleg, ed. (2013), "Sezon dozhdej" Сезон дождей [Rainy season], 057.ua (in Russian), Kharkiv: CitySites
- Omel'chenko, Ljudmila, ed. (2013), "Fotovystavka Mstislava Chernova "Sezon dozhdej" – 14–30 marta 2013 goda" Фотовыставка Мстислава Чернова "Сезон дождей" – 14–30 марта 2013 года [Photo exhibition of Mstislav Chernov "Rainy Season" – March 14–30, 2013], Centr kul'tury i iskusstva Центр культуры и искусства [Center for Culture and Art] (in Russian), Kharkiv: КЗ "ООМЦКМ"
- Donchik, Natalija, ed. (March 21, 2008), "Chto snitsja muzyke? Otvet – na fotovystavke Mstislava Chernova v stenah filarmonii" Что снится музыке? Ответ – на фотовыставке Мстислава Чернова в стенах филармонии [What does music dream about? The answer is at the photo exhibition of Mstislav Chernov at the Philharmonics], Har'kovskij gorodskoj portal Харьковский городской портал [Kharkov city portal] (in Russian), Kharkiv: nezabarom.ua – via MediaPort
- Clarke, Steve, ed. (February 26, 2020), "RTS Television Journalism Awards 2020 sponsored by Avid", Television: Royal Television Society, London: Royal Television Society, ISSN 0308-454X, LCCN 85647402
- Ligachova, Natalіja, ed. (February 4, 2020), "Ukraїnec' Mstislav Chernov nomіnovanij na britans'ku telepremіju jak krashhij operator" Українець Мстислав Чернов номінований на британську телепремію як кращий оператор [Mstislav Chernov, a Ukrainian, has been nominated for a British TV Award as Best Operator], MediaSapiens (in Ukrainian), Kyiv: Детектор медіа
- Bonner, Brian [in Ukrainian], ed. (January 24, 2020), "Production of Dreams, or What the Modern Media Machine Offers", Kyiv Post, Kyiv: Businessgroup LLC, ISSN 1563-6429, LCCN 97032040, OCLC 54952708
- Vlasov, Philipp, ed. (February 3, 2020), "5 glavnyh vystavok fevralja v Kieve" 5 главных выставок февраля в Киеве [5 main exhibitions of February in Kiev], Vogue Ukraine (in Russian), Kyiv: Condé Nast, OCLC 947092856
- Landesman, Tat'jana (January 30, 2020), Kostenko, Tatyana (ed.), "Har'kovchanin demonstriruet svoi sny" Харьковчанин демонстрирует свои сны [Kharkov citizen shows his dreams], Vecherniy Kharkov Вечерний Харьков [Evening Kharkov] (in Russian), Kharkiv: ТОВ «Редакція газети "Вечірній Харків"», OCLC 762014020
- Pugach, Anastasija (January 22, 2020), Ivshina, Larisa [in Ukrainian] (ed.), "Chto predlagaet sovremennaja mediamashina – 24 janvarja otkroetsja vystavka Mstislava Chernova i Igorja Chekachkova" Что предлагает современная медиамашина – 24 января откроется выставка Мстислава Чернова и Игоря Чекачкова [What does a modern media machine offer? – On January 24, an exhibition of Mstislav Chernov and Igor Chekachkov will open], Den' День [Day] (in Ukrainian), no. 10, Kyiv: ТОВ «Українська прес-група»
- Sidorzhevs'kij, Mihajlo [in Ukrainian], ed. (January 10, 2020), ""Chasi snovidіn": korespondent Associated Press prezentue roman pro vіjnu na Donbasі" "Часи сновидінь": кореспондент Associated Press презентує роман про війну на Донбасі ["Time of Dreams": Associated Press presents a novel about the war in the Donbass], Ukrainian literary newspaper Ukraїns'ka lіteraturna gazeta [Ukrainian literary newspaper] (in Ukrainian), Vyshhorod
- Gordon, Dmitry, ed. (January 16, 2020), ""Chasi snovidіn'". Vіjs'kovij korespondent The Associated Press Mstislav Chernov prezentue knigu pro sni і vіjnu na Donbasі" "Часи сновидінь". Військовий кореспондент The Associated Press Мстислав Чернов презентує книгу про сни і війну на Донбасі ["Time of Dreams" The Associated Press war correspondent Mstislav Chernov will present a book about dreams and war in the Donbass region], Bul'var Gordona Бульвар Гордона [Gordon Boulevard] (in Ukrainian), Kyiv
- Nikitenko, Dar'ja (January 29, 2020), Pejic, Nenad (ed.), "Jak ZMІ konstrujujut' sni: medіa-mashina v Closer" Як ЗМІ конструюють сни: медіа-машина в Closer [How Media Constructs Dreams: A Media Machine in Closer], Radio Free Europe/Radio Liberty (in Ukrainian), Prague: United States Congress
