= Felipe Dana =

Brazilian Pulitzer Prize-winning photojournalist (born 1985)

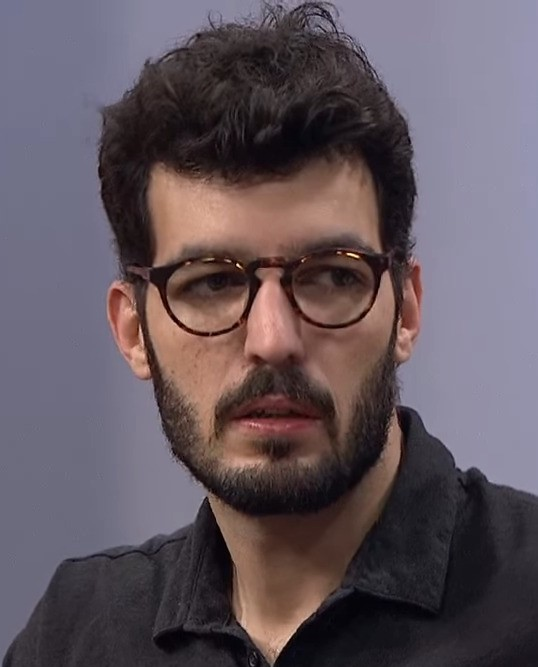
- Dana in 2017
- Born: August 1985 (age 40); Rio de Janeiro, Brazil
- Occupations: Photographer, cinematographer
- Known for: War photography
- Website: www.felipedana.com

Felipe Dana (born August 1985) is a Pulitzer Prize-winning Brazilian photojournalist for the Associated Press (AP).

== Career ==
Dana is known for his coverage of social inequality and urban violence in Latin America and conflicts in various countries including Iraq, Syria, Afghanistan, Gaza, Libya, and Ukraine.

He received World Press Photo awards in 2013, 2017 and 2024. Dana was also part of AP teams finalist for the Pulitzer Prize in 2017, 2018, 2019 and 2021. In 2023, Dana won the Pulitzer Prize for Breaking News Photography for the coverage of Russian invasion of Ukraine, as part of the AP team.

His drone video footage of the Battle of Mosul in Iraq open the action film Mosul on Netflix.

== Awards ==
- 2011: Atlanta Photojournalism Awards
- 2012: Atlanta Photojournalism Awards
- 2013: Pictures of the Year International (POYi) – Pictures of the Year Latam, 3 awards
- 2013: World Press Photo award
- 2015: National Press Photographers Association
- 2016: National Press Photographers Association, 2 awards
- 2016: Pictures of the Year International (POYi)
- 2016: SPJ Sigma Delta Chi Award
- 2016: APME Associated Press Media Editors
- 2016: Oliver S. Gramling Journalism Awards – AP
- 2016: Atlanta Photojournalism Awards
- 2017: APME Associated Press Media Editors
- 2017: Finalist, Pulitzer Prize for Breaking News Photography
- 2017: World Press Photo award
- 2017: National Press Photographers Association, 3 awards
- 2017: Atlanta Photojournalism Awards
- 2018: Finalist, Pulitzer Prize for International Reporting
- 2018: Overseas Press Club of America (OPC)
- 2018: Shorty Awards, Nominated
- 2018: National Headliner Awards, 2 awards
- 2018: APME Associated Press Media Editors
- 2018: Pictures of the Year International (POYi)
- 2019: Finalist, Pulitzer Prize for Breaking News Photography
- 2019: Pictures of the Year International (POYi)
- 2019: The Guardian: Agency Photographer of the Year
- 2019: Pictures of the Year International (POYi) – Pictures of the Year Latam, 3 awards
- 2020: Atlanta Photojournalism Awards, 2 awards
- 2020: National Press Photographers Association
- 2021: Pictures of the Year International (POYi) – Pictures of the Year Latam
- 2021: Finalist, Pulitzer Prize for Breaking News Photography
- 2023: Pulitzer Prize for Breaking News Photography (shared with Bernat Armangue, Evgeniy Maloletka, Emilio Morenatti, Nariman El-Mofty, Rodrigo Abd, and Vadim Ghirda)
- 2023: Overseas Press Club of America (OPC), The Kim Wall Award
- 2024: Webby Awards - People's Voice Winner
- 2024: World Press Photo award - Africa, Open Format
