= Kharkiv Philharmonic Society =

Ukrainian musical organization

The Kharkiv Philharmonic Society (Ukrainian: Харківська обласна філармонія, romanized: Kharkivska oblasna filarmoniia) is a leading musical organization in Ukraine, promoting classical music, contemporary music, and Ukrainian folk music.

The leading group active in the Philharmonic is the Academic Symphony Orchestra, whose principal conductor is Yuriy Yanko. It has 100 musicians of a high professional level, many of whom are prize-winners in international and national competitions. The society also runs the Academic Choir.

== Kharkov Philharmonic building ==
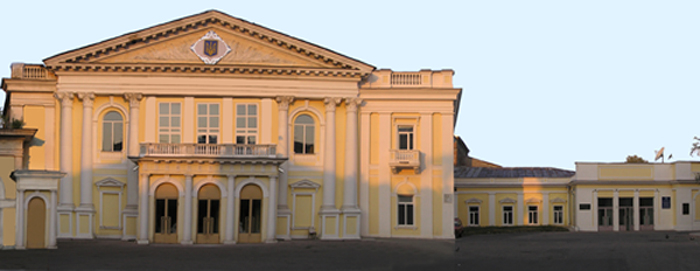
Main entrance of the Kharkiv Philharmonic, Ukraine

The House of the Philharmonic (formerly the Opera House) is a well-known landmark and cultural centre. It has seen performances by Henryk Wieniawski, Pablo Sarasate, Mattia Battistini, Titta Ruffo, Feodor Chaliapin, Piotr Tchaikovsky, Sergei Rachmaninov, Alexander Scriabin, Aram Khachaturian, Mstislav Rostropovich, Dmitri Shostakovich, Krzysztof Penderecki and many other composers and musicians.

It was in this place that the celebrated photographer Alfred Fedetsky held the first cinema performance in Ukraine in 1896. The Ukrainian Broadcasting Station transmitted its first radio signal from here.

The historic building has a newly built organ department, opened in 2019. The new organ by the Alexander Schuke Potsdam Orgelbau company has 5,700 pipes and 72 registers.

During the 2022 Russian invasion of Ukraine, the theater was reported as destroyed.

== Academic Symphony Orchestra ==
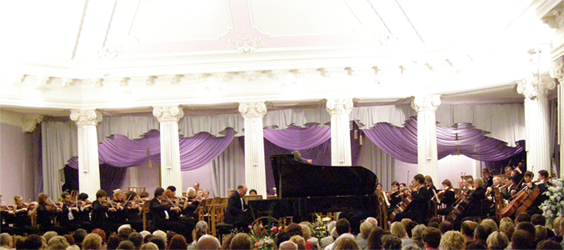
Academic Symphony Orchestra in a concert at the Kharkiv Philharmonic.

The Academic Symphony Orchestra has more than one hundred years of history behind it. In October 1929 it became a leading group within Ukrainian Broadcasting Committee, and after the founding of the Kharkiv Philharmonic Society it was granted official status as a philharmonic. The first decade of the orchestra's existence was marked by music directors like Paul Kletzki (1937–38), collaborations with famous conductors Kurt Sanderling and Guido Adler, Fritz Stiedry, and Eugen Szenkar (Hungary). Natan Rakhlin and David Oistrakh started their career with this orchestra.

Throughout the orchestra's history, well-known musicians have performed with it, including Anton Rubinstein, Henrih Neigauz, Sviatoslav Richter, Emil Gilels, Aram Khachaturian, Mstislav Rostropovich, Rudolf Kehrer, Vladimir Krainev, Dmitri Shostakovich, Vakhtang Jordania, Mikhail Pletnev, Vladimir Spivakov, Dimitri Bashkirov, Daniel Kramer, Sergey Stadler, Alexander Kniazev, Alain Daboncourt, James Oliverio, Sayaka Shoji, Ernest Hoetzl, Anton Sorokow, Alexander Gavrylyuk, Krzysztof Penderecki and many others. In 1986 the orchestra won the orchestra competition amongst Soviet Republics under its Music Director Alexander Alexeev.

At the present time the first violinist of the orchestra is Igor Shapovalov, who has the title of People's Artist of Ukraine.

In 2001 Yuriy Yanko, holder of the title "Honoured Worker of the Arts of Ukraine", and a prize-winner in The International Vakhtang Jordania Conducting Competition, was appointed music director and principal conductor of the Kharkiv Philharmonic Orchestra.

The Kharkiv Philharmonic Orchestra participates regularly in international forums of classical music such as the "Kyiv Music Fest", the "Kharkiv Assembly", "Music – Our Common Home", "Sergey Rakhmaninov and Ukrainian Culture", "The International Vladimir Krainev Young Pianists Competition", "The International Young Pianists Competition" in the town of Kitzingen (Germany), and "The International Vakhtang Jordania Conducting Competition". In addition, the orchestra has made successful concert tours; while on a tour in Spain in 2003 it was recognized as "The Best Foreign Orchestra Of The Year".

In October 2006 the orchestra was granted "Academic" status. The orchestra's audio recordings are kept in the National Radio reserves, its concerts are broadcast on radio and TV, and its reviews are published in the regional and national press.

== Principal Conductor Yuriy Yanko ==
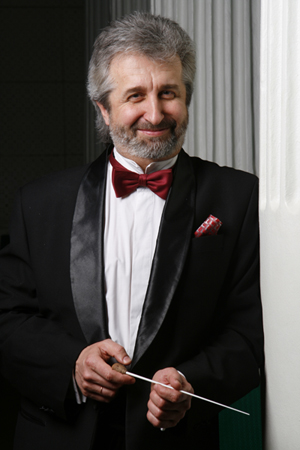
Yuriy Yanko, Director of Kharkiv Philharmonic

Born in Kharkiv, Yanko completed the first part of his musical studies in his native town at Special Music School (1980). He then attended Kharkiv University of Arts (1985) and Kyiv National Conservatory (1991), studying operatic & symphonic conducting with Turchak, Dushchenko, Vakhtang Jordania.

Yanko has been Conductor of the Academic Philharmonic Orchestra in Zaporizhzhya (1991–1994), and music director and Conductor of the Kharkiv Special Music School Chamber Orchestra (1999–2004). Since 1994, he has conducted at the Kharkiv Opera House, where he has staged many opera and ballet performances.

Since 2001 Yanko has worked as music director and Principal Conductor of the Academic Symphony Orchestra of Kharkiv Philharmonic, and in 2004 he was appointed Director of the Kharkiv Philharmonic (which involves several different musical collectives, including the orchestra).

Yanko has received Kharkiv Regional Government Diplomas (2002, 2006), and Kharkiv Mayor's supreme award "For Zeal" (2004). He has been annual laureate of regional rate "Kharkiver of year" for 6 years (2001–2006), and prize-winner of the "Public Recognition" prize (2004), laureate of regional rate "Kharkiver of the 21st century", 2010. He has received the Ukraine Order of Merit from the president of Ukraine.

He has conducted in many countries: Austria, the Netherlands, Egypt, Spain, Italy, Germany, South Korea, Czech Republic, Poland, Bulgaria, Russia, the United States, France, and Switzerland. In the past few years he has guest conducted at the Musikverein Vienna, Rome Symphonic Orchestra, Berlin Symphonic Orchestra, Budapest Symphonic Orchestra, Orquestra Sinfonica Nacional de Mexico, Praha Radio Symphony Orchestra, Kammerphilarmonie Muenchen, Kaertner Symfony Klagenfurt, North Czech Philharmonic Orchestra, and Nuenberger Symphoniker.

== Academic Choir ==
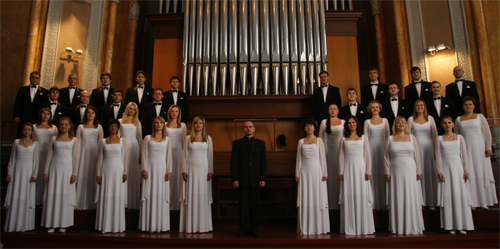
Academic choir of Kharkiv Philharmonic named after V. Palkin and chief leader of choir, prize winner of the all-Ukrainian choir masters contest, Andriy Syrotenko.

Traditions of concert choir singing in Kharkiv Philharmonic were founded as long ago as the 1930s. From 1936 a choir under the direction of a famous Ukrainian choir master O. Bryzchakha performed as part of Kharkiv Philharmonic. In 1938 it was headed by K. Hrechenko, in 1943 by E. Konopliova, in 1944–1945 by H. Davydovs'kyi. In March 1956 the choir was reorganized as the Chorus of Ukrainian Song, which existed until 1962.

The Academic Choir, which now performs as part of Kharkiv Philharmonic, was established in 1980. At that time the chamber choir of a regional department of Ukrainian music society and regional culture administration was established on one of the most outstanding figures of the Vyacheslav Palkin National conductor-choir school's initiative. His performances became a considerable phenomenon in the music life of the city, beginning from his first concert (January 1981). In 1980 the choir toured Kyiv and other cities of Ukraine, Moscow (Russia), Moldova, Latvia, Georgia, South Ossetia, Germany, and the United States, being appreciated by music community everywhere. The choir managed to get a philharmonic status due to intensive concert activity, professional performers and great repertory. In July 1991 the choir for the first time performed as a chamber chorus of Kharkiv Regional Philharmonic.

Concert programmes of the chamber choir are composed of works by Ukrainian composers Lesia Dychko, T. Kravtsov, Mykola Leontovych, Mykola Lysenko, Yevhen Stankovych, Kyrylo Stetsenko, M. Stetsiun; Russian composers V. Gavrylin, Mikhail Glinka, Sergei Rachmaninov, Sergei Taneyev, Alfred Schnittke; west-European composers I. S. Bach, Hector Berlioz, Carl Maria von Weber, O. Lasso, W. A. Mozart, F. Schubert, K. Gorskiy, Krzysztof Penderecki, etc.

In November 2008 the choir received the status of Academic and was named after Vyacheslav Palkin. In 2011 the Academic Choir won Grand Prix at the International Festival "Hajnowskie Dni Muzyki Cerkiewnej" in Hajnówka, Poland. In 2012 it took 4th place at the Béla Bartók 25th International Choir Competition and Folklore Festival in Debrecen, Hungary. This contest included 24 participants from 14 countries of the world.

=== Festivals and events ===
- the first all-Ukrainian choir assembly (Kyiv, 1993)
- creative project "Slobozchans'kyi Velykden" (Kyiv, 1996)
- 2000 years of the Nativity and the Reformation Day celebration (Germany, 2000)
- The VI Choir-fest "Zolotoverkhyi Kyiv" (Kyiv, 2002), "Taras Shevchenko prizewinners' suzir'ya" (Kyiv, 2003)
- The all-Ukrainian choir assembly by 130-years from Oleksandr Koshytsia's birth (Kyiv, 2005)
- Gatherings of artists and artistic groups of Kharkiv region concerts under review (Kyiv – 1999, 2001, 2004)
- Guest of honour at the all-Ukrainian choir contest (Dnipropetrovs'k city, 2006)
- The International contest "Khainovs'ki dni tserkovnykh pisnespiviv" (Poland, 2006, 2009, 2011 Grand-prix of the Festival).

=== Choir discography ===
- "Petite messe sollennelle" Gioachino Rossini, religious and folk music (2000)
- "Spochatku bulo slovo" – exclusive double CD with music by Duke Ellington with jazz musicians from St. Petersburg (Russia) - Vladimir Feiertag and David Goloschekin (2000).
