= Emilio Morenatti =

Spanish (Pulitzer Prize winning) photojournalist (born 1969)

- Born: 1969; General Military Hospital of Defence, Zaragoza
- Occupation: Photojournalist
- Employer: Associated Press (2004–)
- Awards: Prix Lucas Dolega (2012); Pulitzer Prize for Photography (2021); Pictures of the Year International (2022); Pictures of the Year International (2008); Pulitzer Prize for Breaking News Photography (2023); Adoptive Son (Jerez de la Frontera City Council)
- Website: www.emiliomorenatti.com

Emilio Morenatti (born 1969) is a Pulitzer Prize winning Spanish photojournalist, working for the Associated Press since March 2004.

Morenatti was born in 1969 in Zaragoza, Spain, where his father was serving as a police officer, and raised in Jerez de la Frontera.

While working in Gaza City in 2006, he was kidnapped, and held for 15 hours, but released unharmed. In August 2009, he lost a foot when a roadside improvised explosive device exploded near the vehicle in which he was travelling, while embedded with US military forces in Kandahar, Afghanistan.

He was Pictures of the Year International's photographer of the year for newspapers in 2009. The same year, he achieved a National Headliner Award gold medal. He was the National Press Photographers Association's photographer of the year in 2010. In 2013 he won "Contemporary Issues, 3rd prize singles" in the World Press Photo awards. He won the Ortega y Gasset Award for Graphic Journalism, also in 2013, and a 2021 Pulitzer Prize "for a poignant series of photographs that takes viewers into the lives of the elderly in Spain struggling during the COVID-19 pandemic."

From February 2022, he was in Kyiv, reporting on the Russian invasion of Ukraine. For the coverage of the war, he won another Pulitzer Prize for Breaking News Photography as part of the AP team (shared with Bernat Armangue, Evgeniy Maloletka, Felipe Dana, Nariman El-Mofty, Rodrigo Abd, and Vadim Ghirda).
