= Chattanooga Symphony and Opera =

US symphony orchestra and opera company

- Combined Symphony Orchestra and Opera Company
- Founded: November 5, 1933
- Location: Chattanooga, Tennessee
- Concert hall: Tivoli Theatre; Soldiers and Sailors Memorial Auditorium
- Principal conductor: Illya Ram
- Website: https://chattanoogasymphony.org/

The Chattanooga Symphony and Opera, also known as CSO, is a combined symphony orchestra and opera company in Chattanooga, Tennessee. At the time of the merger in 1985, it was the only such combined organization in the United States.

== History ==
=== Mission statement ===
"The mission of the Chattanooga Symphony & Opera is to inspire, engage, and enrich the greater Chattanooga community through music and music education."

=== Chattanooga Symphony ===
In 1896, a small group of musicians formed a group called the Chattanooga Music Club, dedicating themselves to the creation of interest in the "beauties of art" in Chattanooga, Tennessee. The first president of the CMC, was Frank L. Case, who was replaced by Howard Smith in 1899. The Chattanooga Music Club organized many different musical groups including The Mutual Benefits Club formed in 1909. The St. Cecelia Chorus created by a CMC member by the name of Stella Weitzel. The MacDowell Club was founded by Mrs. Elizabeth Bettis, who was a bright pupil of Edward MacDowell. Another club founded was the Chattanooga Male Chorus which would later be called the Chattanooga Civic Chorus who was established by Dr. J Oscar Miller. In 1930, Stella Weitzel asked for monetary founding in sustaining a small group of talented musicians at the University of Chattanooga. A small monetary donation was given to the group by the CMC which was eventually used in the founding of the Chattanooga Symphony Orchestra. The Chattanooga Symphony Orchestra (CSO) was established because of an "enterprising group of young people", who were all looking for opportunities to play music with one another. The Chattanooga Symphony was established when Melvin Margolin, the director, commissioned both recent graduates and students from the local Chattanooga High School, were join by a few adult musicians in town. Once these players were introduced and well rehearsed, they gave the first concert of the Chattanooga Symphony, on November 5, 1933. Because the Chattanooga Symphony featured the young players of the local high school, the music lovers and important community members fell in love with the talent and tenacity of the group. For the first four years of the group's existence, Melvin Margolin, and a friend by the name of Borden Jones, were the leaders of the group. Due to the success of the symphony orchestra, Dr. Arthur Plettner was hired to provide professional leadership in 1937. In the same year, Dr. Arthur Plettner was recognized and appointed the Juilliard Professor of Music at the University of Chattanooga. In 1938, Dr. Plettner was elected to become the conductor of the Chattanooga Symphony Orchestra, and continued to fulfill his title for the next 11 years, resigning from the position of conductor in 1949. After the resignation of Dr. Plettner, there is little know about who was in charge of conducting between the years 1949 and 1955. In 1956, Julius Hegyi, who was also a graduate of Juilliard, was elected as conductor of the orchestra. Julius Hegyi remained the conductor of the Chattanooga Symphony Orchestra until 1956, when he resigned and relocated to Williamstown, Massachusetts. Hegyi was replaced temporarily by a conductor known as Charles Gabor, until he was replaced by Richard Cornier who was the conductor until 1984.

In 1985, Vakntang Jordania, a native of the former Soviet Union, was elected as the conductor and artistic director. As a conductor and leader, Jordania led the group during times of growth. The group, now referred to as the Chattanooga Symphony Orchestra Artist (CSOA), established a core orchestra who were capable of comprehensively blending multiple genres of work, including classical, romantic, and contemporary works. The CSOA, were the host of many famous guest artist including Itzhak Perlman, Gidon Kremer, Jean-Pierre Rampal, and Gary Karr. Vakntang Jordania remained the conductor os the CSOA until resignation and replacement by maestro Robert Bernhardt, who was welcomed as music director and conductor, where he served for 19 seasons. During his time at the CSOA, Maestro Bernhardt pioneered community involvement, increased musical quality, and in return the attendance rates began to increase. To meet the public demand, the maestro organized nineteen performances per season including three operas including, Madame Butterfly, Carmen and La Traviata and four pop concerts. Under the guidance of Maestro Bernhardt, the CSOA also hosted famous guest including Nadja Salerno-Sonnenberg, Ricky Scaggs and Kentucky Thunder, Stella Zambalis, and Edgar Meyer. In the years 2008–2009, the CSO celebrated its 75th anniversary. In attendance to the celebration were current and form members of the orchestra, friends and supporters of the CSO, and many important members of city and state government. In 2009, Maestro Bernhardt became the very first music director emeritus and began on a two-year journey to interview and assign the next music director and conductor. Concurrently, Bob is in his 21st year as principal pops conductor of the Louisville Orchestra, in his 36th consecutive season with the company, and is in his third season as principal pops conductor of the Grand Rapids Symphony in Michigan. He is also an artist-in-residence at Lee University and conductor of the Lee Symphony. Nine candidates were interviewed during two year, but ultimately Kayoko Dan stood out to Maestro Bernhardt. Kayoko Dan made history when she became the first female conductor at the Chattanooga Symphony, along with the title of youngest. Ms. Dan began musical training at the age of three in Japan After moving to the United States of America, Kayoko Dan continued her education and received a bachelor's in music education at the University of Texas. She continued to progress in education to receive a master's in music education and soon after pursued a Doctor of Musical Arts in conducting from Arizona State University. After receiving her bachelor's, master's, and doctorate, she worked as the assistant conductor of the Phoenix Symphony and music director of Central Kentucky Youth Orchestras. Ms. Dan also works as a strong advocate for music education and as a clinician at universities, high schools, youth orchestra and regional orchestras throughout the United States of America

=== Chattanooga Opera Company ===
Around the same time as the Chattanooga Symphony became established, a remarkable pair of musicians was escaping from Nazi Germany and bringing their expertise to the state of Tennessee. The Chattanooga Opera Company was established in 1942 when Dr. Werner Wolff and his wife Emmy Land Wolff came to Chattanooga Symphony and created the first opera company in Tennessee. Both Dr. Werner Wolff and his wife were considered prominent members of the German Opera House. Along with Dr. Werner Wolff and his wife, Mrs. Wolff, Dorothy Hackett Ward was also involved in organizing the founding of the Chattanooga Opera company by becoming the makeup artist for the company. Dorothy Hackett Ward was a graduate of the Yale School of Drama. Madame Wolff was the stage director and taught the company singers how to walk, minuet, bow, use the actors appendages, and how to properly deal with props. Kent Boyd was elected the first president of the Chattanooga Opera. While there was the occasional performance by the Metropolitan Opera Co, the Chicago Opera Company and other companies that were lesser known during the time, had made appearances in the Chattanooga area, there was no real support of the opera until the CSO was founded. The company gave its first performance in February 1943, a production of Il Trovatore. The cast consisted primarily of local singers, but the Wolffs were well-connected in the opera world and attracted a number of renowned performers to Chattanooga as guest artists. Guest artists included Beverly Sills, Jon Vickers, Norman Treigle, Phyllis Curtin, and Norman Scott. Madame Wolff died in 1955, which was a devastating blow to the music community, but Dr. Werner Wolff tried to carry on. He resigned and moved to Ruschlikon, Switzerland, in 1959. Dr. Wolff lived with friends in Switzerland until he died in 1960.

=== Merged organization ===
The Chattanooga Symphony & Opera was the first combined professional resident symphony and opera company in the nation, merging in 1985. World-class Soviet director Vakhtang Jordania was recruited to become the conductor and artistic director. He was succeeded in 1992 by Robert Bernhardt. Bernhardt left the CSO directorship in April 2011. His successor is Kayoko Dan, who made her debut with the CSO in September 2011. Bernhardt has remained at the CSO as music director emeritus and continues to reside in Chattanooga.

== Chattanooga Youth Symphony (CYS) ==
The CSO offers several youth programs under the Chattanooga Youth Symphony (CYS), formerly known as the Chattanooga Symphony and Opera Youth Orchestra (CSOYO). The CYS has four groups; Prelude, Etude, Philharmonic, and Symphony.

The Prelude and Etude groups are strings only, and are targeted towards beginners elementary and middle school aged. Prelude and Etude are conducted by Cellist, Amy Shannon. The upper two orchestras, philharmonic and symphony, are full orchestras, with strings, winds, and percussion. Both orchestras are directed towards upper middle school-aged students, and high school students. The philharmonic orchestra is conducted by flautist Dr. Sandy Morris. The highest orchestra the CYS offers, Symphony, is conducted by the decorated former tubist, Ismael Sandoval. Sandoval studied at the University of Florida for his undergraduate degree, and at Boston Conservatory at Berklee. After graduating from Boston Conservatory, Sandoval worked as the understudy conductor for the Boston Philharmonic, under Benjamin Zander.
