= Yuriy Yanko =

Ukrainian conductor

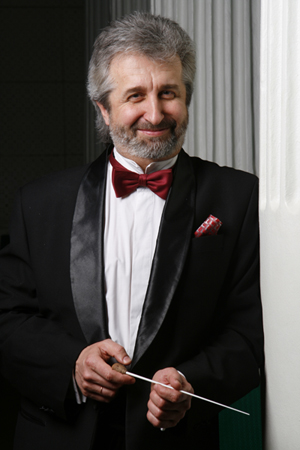
Yanko in 2010

Yuriy Volodymyrovych Yanko (Ukrainian: Юрій Володимирович Янко) is a Ukrainian conductor.

== Life and career ==
Born in Kharkiv, Yanko completed the first part of his musical studies in his native town at Special Music School (1980). He then attended Kharkiv University of Arts (1985) and Kyiv National Conservatory (1991), studying operatic & symphonic conducting with Turchak, Dushchenko, Vakhtang Jordania.

Yanko has been conductor of the Academic Philharmonic Orchestra in Zaporizhzhya (1991–1994), and music director and conductor of the Kharkiv Special Music School Chamber Orchestra (1999–2004). Since 1994, he has conducted at the Kharkiv Opera House, where he has staged many opera and ballet performances.

Since 2001 Yanko has worked as music director and principal conductor of the Academic Symphony Orchestra of Kharkiv Philharmonic Society, and in 2004 he was appointed director of the Kharkiv Philharmonic (which involves several different musical collectives, including the orchestra).

Yanko has received Kharkiv Regional Government Diplomas (2002, 2006), and Kharkiv Mayor's supreme award "For Zeal" (2004). He has been annual laureate of regional rate "Kharkiver of year" for 6 years (2001–2006), and prize-winner of the "Public Recognition" prize (2004), laureate of regional rate "Kharkiver of the 21st century", 2010.

He has conducted in many countries: Austria, the Netherlands, Egypt, Spain, Italy, Germany, South Korea, the Czech Republic, Poland, Bulgaria, Russia, the United States, France, and Switzerland.

In the past few years he has guest conducted at the Musikverein Vienna, Rome Symphonic Orchestra, Berlin Symphonic Orchestra, Budapest Symphonic Orchestra, National Symphony Orchestra (Mexico), Praha Radio Symphony Orchestra, Kammerphilarmonie München, Kärtner Symfony Klagenfurt, North Czech Philharmonic Orchestra, and Nuremberg Symphony Orchestra.

He has received the order of merits for the republic of Ukraine from the president of Ukraine.

== Recordings ==
Shostakovich concerts № 6, № 2 are recorded Moravian Philharmonic in the Czech Radio studios in Olomouc.

Singers: Sergey Stilmashenko (Grand Opera)

Instrumentalists – Anton Sorokov (piano), Vadim Repin (violin), Daniil Kramer (piano), Alexander Knyazev (cello), Dmitri Bashkirov (piano), Nikolay Petrov (piano), Vladimir Kraynev (piano), Victor Pikayzen (violin), and Sergey Stadler (violin).
