= Evgeniy Maloletka =

Ukrainian photographer (born 1987)

- Євген Малолєтка
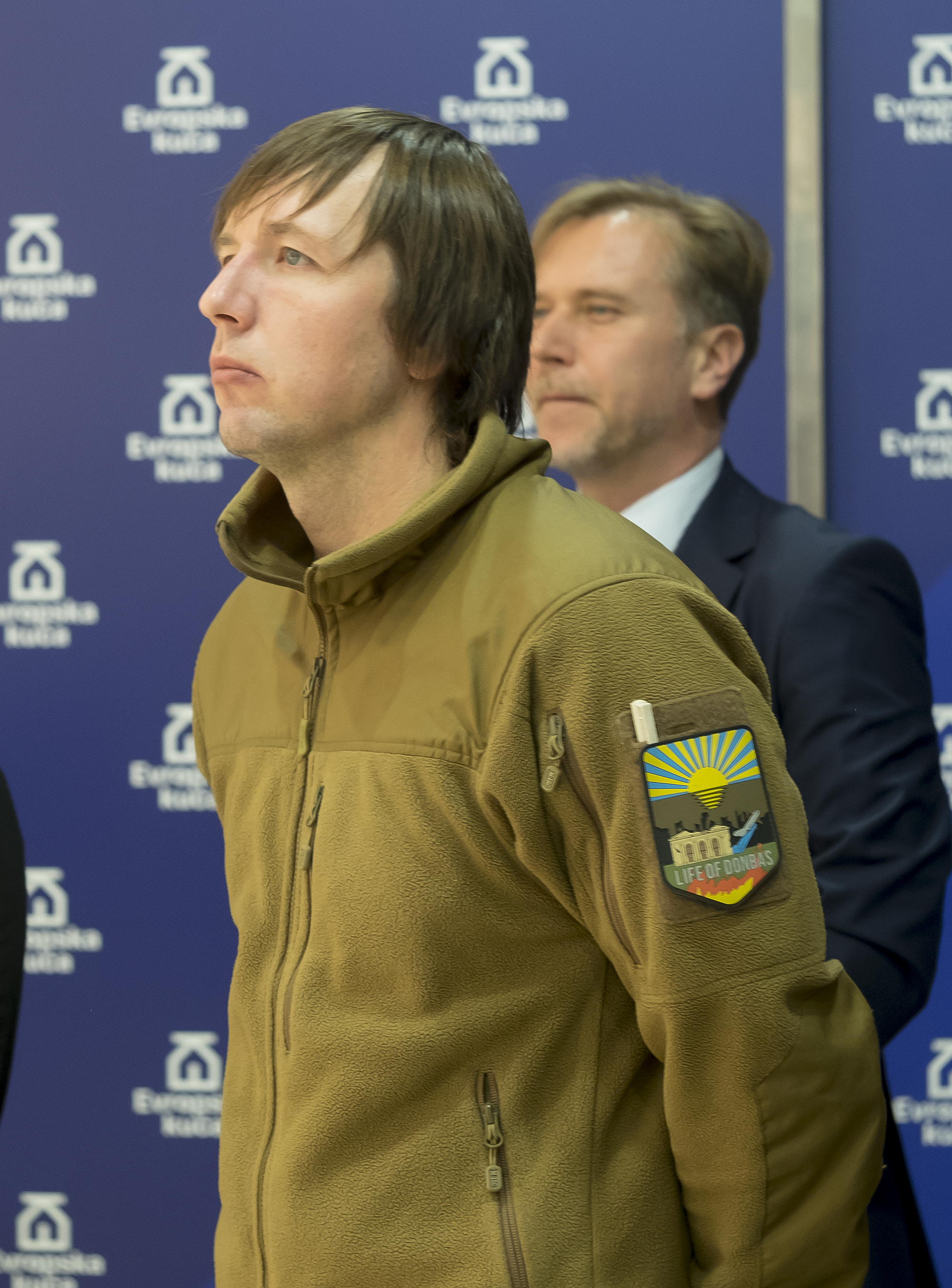
- Maloletka in Belgrade, 2024
- Born: 1 March 1987 (age 39); Berdiansk, Zaporizhzhia Oblast, Ukrainian SSR, Soviet Union
- Education: Igor Sikorsky Kyiv Polytechnic Institute
- Awards: Pulitzer Prize for Public Service (2023); Pulitzer Prize for Breaking News Photography (2023); Shevchenko National Prize (2024)

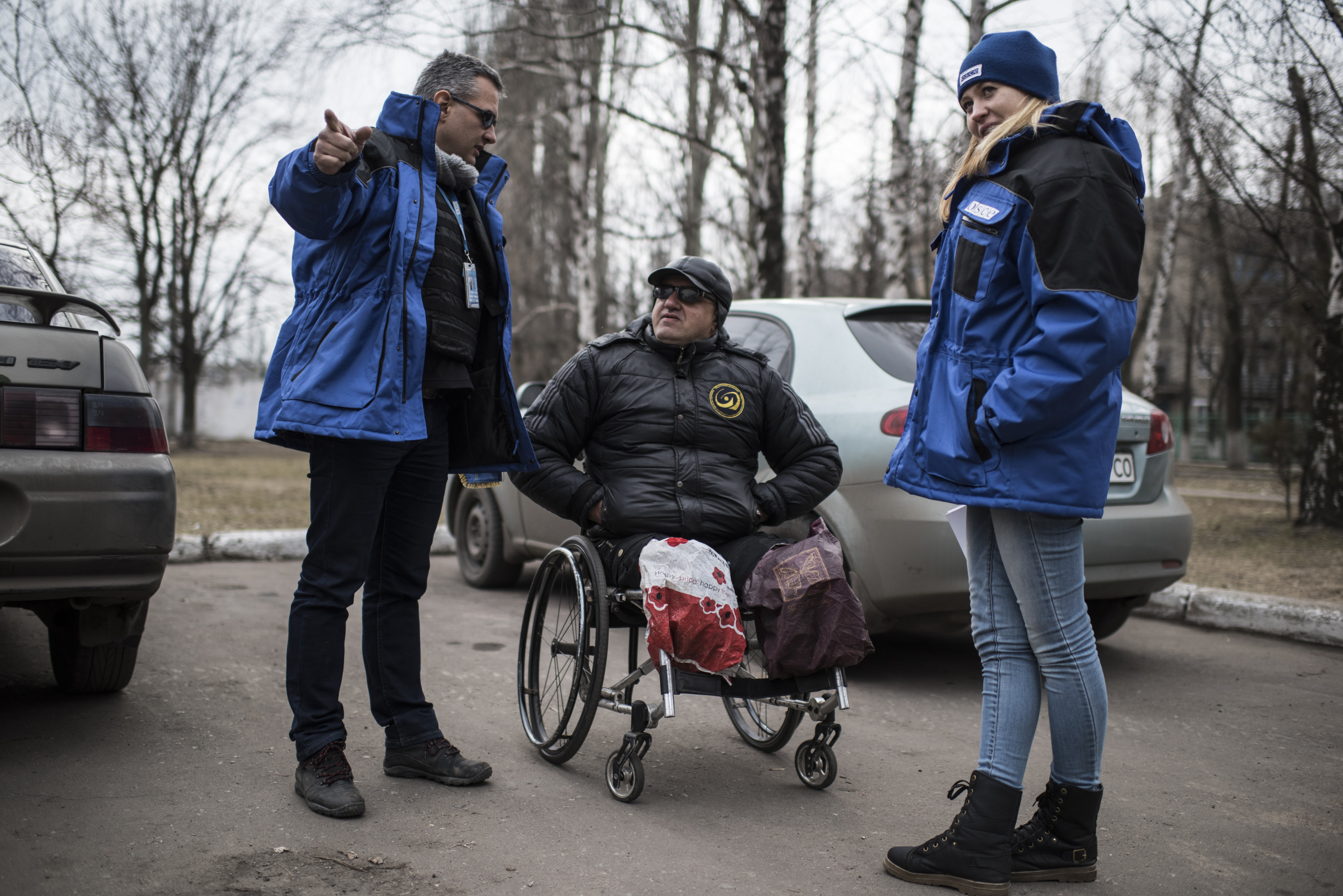
OSCE SMM monitoring the movement of heavy weaponry in eastern Ukraine, 2015.

Evgeniy Konstantinovich Maloletka (Ukrainian: Євген Костянтинович Малолєтка, romanized: Yevhen Kostiantynovych Malolietka, Russian: Евгений Константинович Малолетка; born 1 March 1987) is a Ukrainian journalist and photographer. He covered the siege of Mariupol during the Russian invasion of Ukraine, and, in particular, made a photograph of a woman wounded as a result of the maternity hospital bombing, which won World Press Photo of the Year. In 2023, he won two Pulitzer Prizes, one for public service, which he shared with Mstyslav Chernov, Vasilisa Stepanenko, and Lori Hinnant, and another one for breaking news photography, shared with Felipe Dana, Emilio Morenatti, Rodrigo Abd, Nariman El-Mofty, Vadim Ghirda, and Bernard Armangue, as part of the Associated Press team for coverage of the war in Ukraine.

== Early life and education ==
Maloletka was born in Berdiansk. He studied electronics at Igor Sikorsky Kyiv Polytechnic Institute and graduated in 2010.

== Life and work ==
In 2009, he started as a staff photographer for UNIAN. Later, he worked as a freelancer and collaborated with the Associated Press, Al Jazeera, and Der Spiegel, among others.

In 2013–2014, Maloletka covered the protests in Kyiv that led to the ouster of President Yanukovych.On 1 December 2013 while he was filming on Bankova Street near the Presidential Administration building, Berkut officers broke his arm and smashed his camera.

In 2020–21, Maloletka covered the COVID-19 pandemic in Ukraine. In particular, his photo of the doctor Evhen Venzhynovych was widely used for social advertisement.

In February and March 2022, during the Russian invasion of Ukraine, the Associated Press staff member Mstyslav Chernov, videoproducer Vasilisa Stepanenko, and Maloletka, freelancers working for AP, stayed in Mariupol, which was encircled by the Russian troops, under siege, and extensively bombed, whereas the Russian Ministry of Foreign Affairs and the Defense Ministry claimed that Russia only targets military installations. Chernov, Maloletka, and Stepanenko were among the few journalists, and, according to the AP, the only international journalists in Mariupol during that period, and their photographs were extensively used by Western media to cover the situation. According to Chernov, on 11 March they were in a hospital taking photos when they were taken of the city with the assistance of Ukrainian soldiers. They managed to escape from Mariupol unharmed.

== Awards ==
- 2022: Knight International Journalism Award, with Chernov and Vasilisa Stepanenko, for their work in Mariupol
- 2022: Visa d'Or Award
- 2023: Regional winner, World Press Photo, photo series category
- 2023: World Press Photo of the Year, World Press Photo Foundation
- 2023: Pulitzer Prize for Public Service (shared with Mstyslav Chernov, Vasilisa Stepanenko, and Lori Hinnant).
- 2023: Pulitzer Prize for Breaking News Photography (shared with Bernat Armangue, Emilio Morenatti, Felipe Dana, Nariman El-Mofty, Rodrigo Abd, and Vadim Ghirda).
- 2024: Shevchenko National Prize
