= Unframe =

UNFRAME
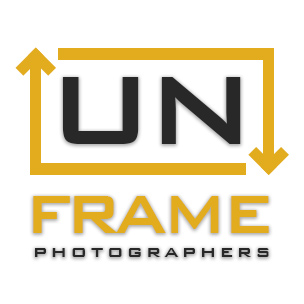
- Company type: Cooperative
- Industry: Photography
- Founded: 2013
- Founder: Riccardo Budini
- Headquarters: Rome Italy
- Area served: Worldwide
- Key people: Mstyslav Chernov, Alexandros Demetriades, Juan Herrero, Riccardo Budini
- Products: Photojournalism, photo agency
- Website: unframe.com

UnFrame collective is an independent resource of documentary photography exclusively managed by an international group of photographers dedicated to shining the spotlight on social, political and everyday issues that surround us. The collective was founded in February 2013 with the aim of developing and working on both long term social and political issues with a deeper perspective in addition to responding to news events as they happen anywhere in the world.

== Documented events ==
In 2013, during the first year of its activity, events documented were:

- The Rana Plaza building collapse in Dhaka, Bangladesh.
- The 2013 protests in Turkey.
- The consequences on civilians of the troubled political season in Bangladesh.
- The Ukraine political crisis, the Kiev revolution (Euromaidan) and the Russian occupation of Crimea.

== Issues ==
The photographers have organized a collective archive of long-term issues. Amongst others are the following:

- The aftermath of the Arab Spring in North Africa and the Middle East.
- Three years of civil unrest and economic hardship in Italy.
- The social consequences of the political division of Cyprus.
- The social conditions of the Roma in Europe.

Starting from September 2013 UnFrame self manages the collectives' growing archives to best facilitate the syndication of its work in the most efficient way possible. To this effect, it has also partnered with key resource media outlets allowing for the distribution of its photographs including the French photo agency Cosmos.
