= Robert Bernhardt =

American conductor

Robert "Bob" Bernhardt is an American symphony conductor. He is currently in his 27th season as Principal Pops Conductor of the Louisville Orchestra (and in his 43rd consecutive season there), and in his 13th season as Music Director Emeritus of the Chattanooga Symphony and Opera (where he was music director for 19 seasons). In 2015, he was named principal pops conductor of the Grand Rapids Symphony.

Born in Rochester, New York, Robert Bernhardt holds a master's degree from the University of Southern California Thornton School of Music, where he studied with Daniel Lewis. He is also a Phi Beta Kappa, summa cum laude graduate of Union College in Schenectady, New York, where he was an Academic All-American Baseball Player and captain of the soccer team.

== Career highlights ==
Formerly, he was principal conductor and artistic director of the Rochester Philharmonic, music director and conductor of the Tucson Symphony, principal guest conductor of Kentucky Opera, music director and conductor of the Amarillo Symphony, and artistic director of the Lake Placid Sinfonietta. For most of the 1980s, he was also associate conductor of the Louisville Orchestra.

He first conducted the Boston Pops in 1992, at the invitation of John Williams, and he has been a frequent guest ever since. Along with Boston, he has been a frequent guest conductor of the Edmonton Symphony Orchestra (now in his 18th season as conductor of their Symphony Under the Sky Festival), the Baltimore Symphony, the Detroit Symphony, the Cincinnati Pops, the Pittsburgh Symphony, the Dallas Symphony, the Houston Symphony, the Seattle Symphony, the Pacific Symphony, the Florida Orchestra, the Las Vegas Philharmonic, and the Santa Barbara Symphony. He has been a guest with the St. Louis Symphony, Virginia Symphony, Phoenix Symphony, and many others.

Bernhardt has worked with Broadway performers including Brian Stokes Mitchell, Ron Raines, Debbie Gravitte, Megan Hilty, and Kelli O’Hara; with pop/rock/R&B, Indie and country acts including the Beach Boys, the B-52s, Violent Femmes, Ne-Yo, Ricky Skaggs and Wynonna; and with entertainers such as Ben Folds, Randy Newman, Renee Fleming, Jason Alexander and Patti LuPone.

He conducted productions with Kentucky Opera for 18 consecutive seasons, and for 19 seasons with his own company in Chattanooga, as well as many guest conducting engagements with the Nashville Opera.
