= Vasilisa Stepanenko =

Ukrainian award-winning journalist (born 1999)

- Василиса Степаненко
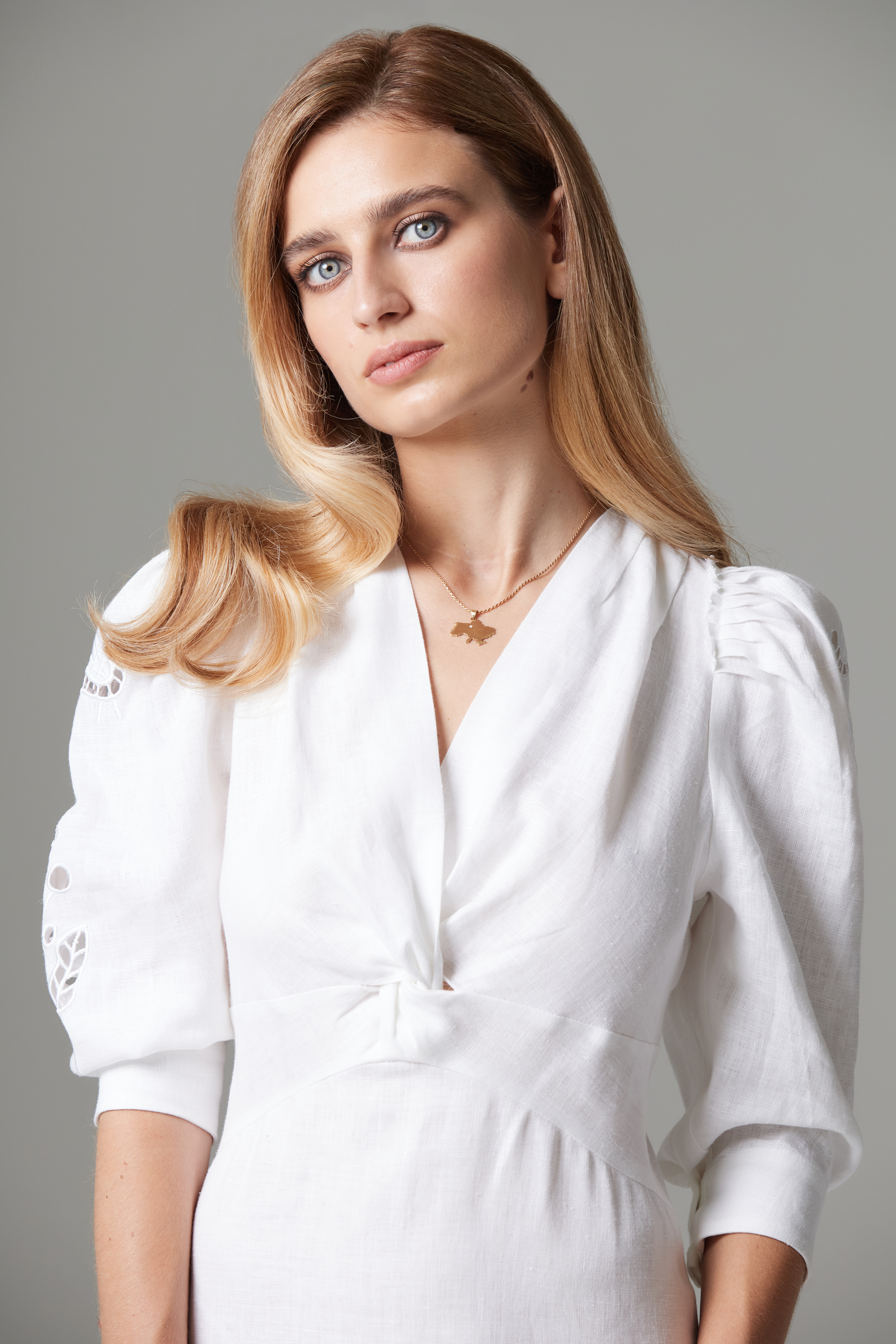
- Stepanenko in 2024
- Born: 19 November 1999 (age 26); Kharkov, Ukraine
- Education: Kharkiv State Academy of Culture
- Employer: Associated Press
- Awards: Pulitzer Prize for Public Service

Vasylysa Illivna Stepanenko (also Vasilisa Stepanenko; Ukrainian: Василиса Іллівна Степаненко; born 19 November 1999) is a Ukrainian journalist and video producer. In 2023, she shared the Pulitzer Prize for Public Service with Evgeniy Maloletka, Mstyslav Chernov, and Lori Hinnant for her work with the Associated Press covering the Russian invasion of Ukraine.

== Life and work ==
Vasilisa Stepanenko was born on 19 November 1999, in Kharkiv. She attended the Kharkiv State Academy of Culture and graduated with a Bachelor degree in Journalism in 2021.

Stepanenko started working as a freelancer with the Associated Press in January 2022. In February and March 2022, during the Russian invasion of Ukraine, the Associated Press staff member Mstyslav Chernov, photographer Evgeniy Maloletka, and Stepanenko, freelancers working for AP, stayed in Mariupol, which was encircled by the Russian troops, under siege, and extensively bombed, whereas the Russian Ministry of Foreign Affairs and the Defense Ministry claimed that Russia only targets military installations. Chernov, Maloletka, and Stepanenko were among the few journalists, and, according to the AP, the only international journalists in Mariupol during that period, and their photographs were extensively used by Western media to cover the situation. Stepanenko acted as video producer.

She was one of the producers of 20 Days in Mariupol.

== Awards ==
- 2023: Pulitzer Prize for Public Service, shared with Evgeniy Maloletka, Mstyslav Chernov, and Lori Hinnant for her work with the Associated Press covering the Russian invasion of Ukraine
- 2024: Shevchenko National Prize
- 2024: International Septimius Awards.
