= Rodrigo Abd =

Argentine photojournalist

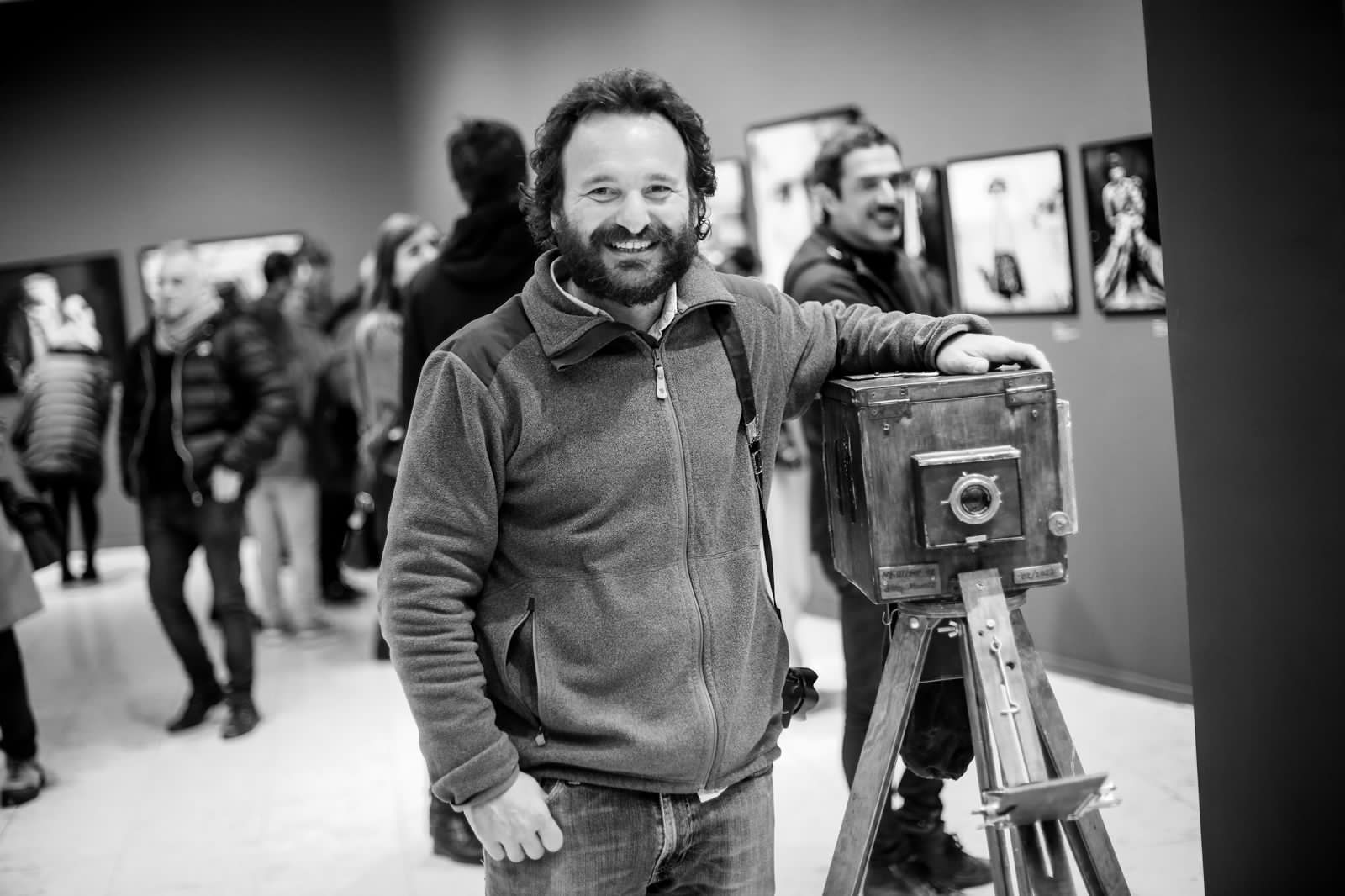
- Abd in 2023
- Born: October 27, 1976 (age 49); Buenos Aires, Argentina
- Occupation: Staff Photographer
- Known for: Photojournalism
- Website: rodrigoabd.com

Rodrigo Abd is a Pulitzer Prize winning Argentine photojournalist for the Associated Press (AP). He was part of a team awarded the Pulitzer Prize in 2013 for its coverage of the Syrian Civil War.

== Biography & Career ==
Abd was born in Buenos Aires on October 27, 1976. Abd began his career for several newspapers (La Razon and La Nacion) as a staff photographer from 1999 to 2003. In 2003 Abd began working for the Associated Press based in Guatemala (the only exception being his operation in Kabul, Afghanistan in 2006) as a staff photographer. Since then he has continued his work under the Associated Press on multiple special assignments and is currently living in Lima, Peru. As a staff photographer Abd has been praised for his passion documenting subjects that photographers may shy away from. Most of Abd's work in Guatemala depicted hospital wards, violent crime scenes, and uprooted graves. Abd is known for his keen photographer's eye and his focus on the interrelation of social struggles; the cause and effect empower his works. The following quote form Abd epitomizes his philosophy on photojournalism;

Abd had described his coverage of Gautamela as an effort to document the country's postwar reality, focusing on the daily impact of daily violence, high murder rates, systematic fear. ”

== Awards ==
Abd was awarded the 2013 Pulitzer Prize for Breaking News Photography along with his peers at the Associated Press for his depictions of the Syrian Civil War. He shared the award with fellow Associated Press staff photographers Manu Brado, Khalil Harma, Narciso Contreras, and Muhammed Muheisen. And his peers were selected for the award because of their depictions of the dismantled neighborhoods and strong focus on the conflict's effect on families and youth. The photographers were also commended for going so far and risking their lives without permission or protection from the Syrian government in the midst of a war zone.

Abd won first place in the 2013 World Press Photo contest's General News Single category for a photograph of the Syrian Civil War."2013 Photo Contest, General News, 1st prize: Rodrigo Abd". World Press Photo. The image shows a Syrian woman named Aida mourning the deaths of her husband and two children after her home was shelled."2013 World Press Photo Awards Announced". Time. February 15, 2013.

In 2008, Abd was awarded first place in the POYi Feature Picture Story category for his "Cemetery Dues" covering the lack of grave space in Guatemala City, leaving many carcasses displaced. The judges commended Abd for finding beautiful images in situations with little beauty, and went on to praise AP photographers as a whole for being "courageous in their storytelling process to bring the images back to places where people don't live in fear."

In 2023, for the coverage of the Russian invasion of Ukraine, he won another Pulitzer Prize for Breaking News Photography as part of the AP team (shared with Bernat Armangue, Evgeniy Maloletka, Felipe Dana, Nariman El-Mofty, Emilio Morenatti, and Vadim Ghirda).
