= Vakhtang Jordania =

Georgian conductor (1943–2005)

Vakhtang Jordania (Georgian: ვახტანგ ჟორდანია; born 9 December 1943, Tbilisi, Georgian SSR, Soviet Union – 4 October 2005, Broadway, Virginia, United States) was a Georgian conductor.

== Biography ==
Born in the Georgian SSR on 9 December 1943, Jordania studied piano from the age of five. After graduating from the Tbilisi Conservatory, he studied symphonic and operatic conducting at the Leningrad Conservatory, graduating with honors. A top prize at the 1971 Herbert von Karajan Competition catapulted him to the highest circle of Soviet artistry. From his assistantship with Yevgeny Mravinsky until his defection to the United States in 1983, Jordania held positions as music director of the Leningrad Radio Orchestra, the Saratov Philharmonic, and the Kharkiv Philharmonic. The Tchaikovsky Competition was under his baton twice. Conducting for more than one hundred concerts a year, he regularly toured the USSR, collaborating with musicians such as David and Igor Oistrakh, Leonid Kogan, Dmitri Shostakovich, Kiril Kondrashin, and Emil Gilels.

== Defection ==
He defected to the West in 1983 by being driven across the Finnish-Swedish border in Haaparanta to Luleå, Sweden, and on to Stockholm by Jyrki Koulumies, a Finnish journalist. In Sweden, Jordania and his then lover, Victoria Mullova, were taken by the Swedish Security Service to a safehouse. They were treated by the authorities just like any other political defectors from the Eastern Bloc, who suggested that the couple stay in a safehouse over the weekend until the American embassy opened, where they then applied for political asylum. For two days they sat under false names in a safehouse room, not even daring to go outside because their photographs were on the front page of every Swedish and international newspaper. Two days later they were in Washington, D.C., with American visas in their pockets.

Immediately after his defection, Jordania made his Carnegie Hall debut, which was described by The New York Times as "a confident and spirited performance ... the full house leaped to its feet." Success followed in Europe, Japan, South Korea, New Zealand, Australia, and South America. His appearances in major American cities brought more critical acclaim. After his defection, he held music director and/or principal guest conductor positions with the Chattanooga Symphony and Opera, the Spokane Symphony, the Daegu City Symphony and KBS Symphony Orchestra in South Korea, the Russian Federal Orchestra and St. Petersburg Festival Orchestra of Russia, and Kharkiv Philharmonic of Ukraine, with whom he was appointed for life. Jordania's homeland, the Republic of Georgia, bestowed on him the highest award given to outstanding Georgians, the Ordin of Honor. Also, Ukraine awarded him their highest Medal of Honor for Musical Excellence.

Jordania regularly conducted at many prestigious opera houses in Russia, the United States, Ukraine, and South Korea, including the Bolshoi and Kirov Theaters. In the United States he conducted the North American premiere of Dvorák's Rusalka. Right before he died he was the Principal Guest Conductor of the Kharkiv Opera, and the Korean American Opera Company.

He recorded for Melodiya, Koch International Classics, Soundset Summit, Helicon, Trained Ear, Cantabile, and Angelok Classics. He also recorded many soundtracks, including the award-winning film Dersu Uzala, directed by Akira Kurosawa. Three of his compact discs were nominated for Grammy Awards (Rachmaninoff Symphony No. 2 with Russian Federal Orchestra, Angelok Classics; in five categories for Hovhaness Symphonies Nos. 46 and 39 with KBS Symphony Orchestra, KOCH International Classics; and music of James Cohn with Latvian National Symphony, XLNT Music).

In 1999 and 2000, the IBLA International Competition hosted the "Jordania Prize", which was named after Jordania, and designed to further the knowledge of young artists who compete in worldwide competitions, Jordania was honored in 2001 with the creation of the Vakhtang Jordania International Conducting Competition in Ukraine. Since then it has been an annually held event, which attracts contestants from over 25 different countries.

The Jordania Prize of the IBLA International Competition is bestowed in his honor; while the Vakhtang Jordania International Conducting Competition is held annually in Ukraine. In 2006 the winners were James Feddeck (US), John Traill (UK) and Sasha Mäkilä (Finland).

He was a National Patron of Delta Omicron, an international professional music fraternity.

== Personal life ==
Jordania's first wife was Nana Askurava, with whom he had one son; the marriage ended in divorce. His second wife was Nataliya Bondarchuk. Before their divorce, the couple had one daughter. Jordania's third wife was Kimberley Stebbins. The couple remained together until the conductor's death.

== See also ==
- List of Eastern Bloc defectors
