= 2019 Fangoria Chainsaw Awards =

Annual US horror film awards ceremony

25th Fangoria Chainsaw Awards
- Presented by: Fangoria
- Announced on: January 22, 2019
- Presented on: February 25, 2019

Highlights
- Most awards: Hereditary (6)
- Most nominations: Hereditary (7)

The 25th Fangoria Chainsaw Awards is an award ceremony presented for horror films that were released in 2018. The nominees were announced in January 2019. The film Hereditary won five of its seven nominations, including Best Wide Release, as well as the write-in poll of Best Kill.

== Winners and nominees ==
Best Wide Release	Best Limited Release
Hereditary – Directed by Ari Aster; Halloween – Directed by David Gordon Green; Overlord – Directed by Julius Avery; A Quiet Place – Directed by John Krasinski; Upgrade – Directed by Leigh Whannell	Mandy – Directed by Panos Cosmatos; Anna and the Apocalypse – Directed by John McPhail; Revenge – Directed by Coralie Fargeat; Suspiria – Directed by Luca Guadagnino; Terrifier – Directed by Damien Leone
Best International Movie	Best Streaming Premiere
Terrified – Directed by Demián Rugna (Argentina); Blue My Mind – Directed by Lisa Brühlmann (Switzerland); Cold Hell – Directed by Stefan Ruzowitzky (Germany); The Housemaid – Directed by Derek Nguyen (Vietnam); The Night Eats the World – Directed by Dominique Rocher (France)	Bird Box – Directed by Susanne Bier (Netflix); Apostle – Directed by Gareth Evans (Netflix); Black Mirror: Bandersnatch – Directed by David Slade (Netflix); Cam – Directed by Daniel Goldhaber (Netflix); Verónica – Directed by Paco Plaza (Netflix)
Best Director	Best First Feature
Ari Aster – Hereditary; Panos Cosmatos – Mandy; Coralie Fargeat – Revenge; John Krasinski – A Quiet Place; Demián Rugna – Terrified	Ghost Stories – Directed by Andy Nyman and Jeremy Dyson; Cargo – Directed by Ben Howling and Yolanda Ramke; The Cleanse – Directed by Bobby Miller; The Dark – Directed by Justin P. Lange; The Ranger – Directed by Jenn Wexler
Best Actor	Best Actress
Nicolas Cage – Mandy as Red Miller; James Jude Courtney / Nick Castle – Halloween as Michael Myers / The Shape; Anders Danielsen Lie – The Night Eats the World as Sam; Matt Dillon – The House That Jack Built as Jack; Logan Marshall-Green – Upgrade as Grey Trace	Toni Collette – Hereditary as Annie Graham; Nadia Alexander – The Dark as Mina; Emily Blunt – A Quiet Place as Evelyn Abbott; Jamie Lee Curtis – Halloween as Laurie Strode; Violetta Schurawlow – Cold Hell as Özge Dogruol
Best Supporting Actor	Best Supporting Actress
Alex Wolff – Hereditary as Peter Graham; Chance Bennett – Slice as Dax Lycander; Joshua Leonard – Unsane as David Strine; Linus Roache – Mandy as Jeremiah Sand; David Howard Thornton – Terrifier as Art the Clown	Tilda Swinton – Suspiria as Madame Blanc / Mother Helena Markos / Dr. Josef Klemperer; Simone Landers – Cargo as Thoomi; Milly Shapiro – Hereditary as Charlie Graham; Millicent Simmonds – A Quiet Place as Regan Abbott; Marli Siu – Anna and the Apocalypse as Lisa
Best Screenplay	Best Score
Hereditary – Ari Aster; Cam – Isa Mazzei; The Cleanse – Bobby Miller; The Cured – David Freyne; A Quiet Place – Scott Beck, Bryan Woods, and John Krasinski	Mandy – Jóhann Jóhannsson; Ghost Stories – Frank Ilfman; Hereditary – Colin Stetson; Puppet Master: The Littlest Reich – Fabio Frizzi; Suspiria – Thom Yorke
Best Make-Up FX	Best Creature FX
Suspiria – Mark Coulier; The Dark – Zane Knisely and Marissa Clemence; Halloween – Christopher Nelson; Mandy – Oriane de Neve; Terrified – Marcos Berta; Terrifier – Damien Leone	The Ritual – Josh Russell and Sierra Russell; The Cleanse – Nicholas Podbrey and Werner Pretorius; Cold Skin – Arturo Belseiro; Possum – Adam Johansen; Puppet Master: The Littlest Reich – Tate Steinsiek
Best Series	Best Kill (write-in category)
The Haunting of Hill House (Netflix); American Horror Story: Apocalypse (FX); Castle Rock (Hulu); Channel Zero (Syfy); Chilling Adventures of Sabrina (Netflix)	Charlie Meets Telephone Pole — Hereditary
