= 2024 Fangoria Chainsaw Awards =

Annual US horror film awards ceremony

30th Fangoria Chainsaw Awards
- Release poster
- Presented by: Fangoria
- Announced on: July 8, 2024
- Presented on: October 13, 2024
- Hosted by: Angel Melanson and David Dastmalchian

Highlights
- Most awards: Evil Dead Rise (4)

The 30th Fangoria Chainsaw Awards is an award ceremony presented for horror films that were released in 2023. The nominees were announced on July 8, 2024.

== Winners and nominees ==
Best Wide Release	Best Limited Release
Godzilla Minus One − Directed by Takashi Yamazaki; Abigail − Directed by Matt Bettinelli-Olpin and Tyler Gillett; Evil Dead Rise − Directed by Lee Cronin; The First Omen − Directed by Arkasha Stevenson; Infinity Pool − Directed by Brandon Cronenberg; Late Night with the Devil − Directed by Colin and Cameron Cairnes; M3GAN − Directed by Gerard Johnstone; Satanic Hispanics − Directed by Mike Mendez, Demián Rugna, Eduardo Sánchez, Gigi Saul Guerrero, and Alejandro Brugués; Talk to Me − Directed by Danny and Michael Philippou; When Evil Lurks − Directed by Demián Rugna	I Saw the TV Glow − Directed by Jane Schoenbrun; Cobweb − Directed by Samuel Bodin; Enys Men − Directed by Mark Jenkin; The Outwaters − Directed by Robbie Banfitch; Suitable Flesh − Directed by Joe Lynch
Best International Movie	Best Streaming Premiere
When Evil Lurks − Directed by Demián Rugna (Argentina); The Coffee Table − Directed by Caye Casas (Spain); Exhuma − Directed by Jang Jae-hyun (South Korea); Infested − Directed by Sébastien Vaniček (France); Huesera: The Bone Woman − Directed by Michelle Garza Cervera (Mexico)	V/H/S/85 − Directed by Mike P. Nelson, Gigi Saul Guerrero, Natasha Kermani, Scott Derrickson, and David Bruckner (Shudder); No One Will Save You − Directed by Brian Duffield (Hulu); Sick − Directed by John Hyams (Peacock); Totally Killer − Directed by Nahnatchka Khan (Prime Video); Where the Devil Roams − Directed by John Adams, Zelda Adams, and Toby Poser (Tubi)
Best Director	Best First Feature
Lee Cronin − Evil Dead Rise; Brandon Cronenberg − Infinity Pool; Danny and Michael Philippou − Talk to Me; Demián Rugna − When Evil Lurks; Arkasha Stevenson − The First Omen	Skinamarink − Directed by Kyle Edward Ball; The Angry Black Girl and Her Monster − Directed by Bomani J. Story; Birth/Rebirth − Directed by Laura Moss; It Lives Inside − Directed by Bishal Dutta; Stopmotion − Directed by Robert Morgan
Best Lead Performance	Best Supporting Performance
David Dastmalchian − Late Night with the Devil as Jack Delroy; Tobin Bell − Saw X as John Kramer; Kaitlyn Dever − No One Will Save You as Brynn; Nell Tiger Free − The First Omen as Margaret; Kathryn Newton − Lisa Frankenstein as Lisa Swallows; Lupita Nyong'o − A Quiet Place: Day One as Samira "Sam"; Emma Stone − Poor Things as Bella Baxter; Lily Sullivan − Evil Dead Rise as Beth; Sydney Sweeney − Immaculate as Sister Cecilia; Sophie Wilde − Talk to Me as Mia	Alyssa Sutherland − Evil Dead Rise as Ellie; Dave Bautista − Knock at the Cabin as Leonard; Joe Bird − Talk to Me as Riley; Nicolas Cage − Renfield as Dracula; Mia Goth − Infinity Pool as Gabi Bauer; Kathryn Newton − Abigail as Sammy; Brigette Lundy-Paine − I Saw the TV Glow as Maddy Wilson; Dewayne Perkins − The Blackening as Dewayne; Dan Stevens − Abigail as Frank; Alisha Weir − Abigail as Abigail
Best Screenplay	Best Score
Late Night with the Devil − Colin and Cameron Cairnes; The First Omen − Arkasha Stevenson, Tim Smith, and Keith Thomas; Infinity Pool − Brandon Cronenberg; M3GAN − Akela Cooper and James Wan; Talk to Me − Danny and Michael Philippou	Godzilla Minus One − Naoki Satō; Evil Dead Rise − Stephen McKeon; The First Omen − Mark Korven; I Saw the TV Glow − Alex G; Infinity Pool − Tim Hecker
Best Make-Up FX	Best Creature FX
Evil Dead Rise − Luke Polti; Abigail − Liz Byrne, Paul Byrne, and Matthew Smith; In a Violent Nature − Steven Kostanski; Talk to Me − Bec Buratto, Paul Katte, and Nick Nicolaou; When Evil Lurks − Marcos Berta	Evil Dead Rise − Adam Johansen and Damian Martin/Odd Studio; Five Nights at Freddy's − Jim Henson's Creature Shop; Infested − Thierry Onillon and Léo Ewald; The Last Voyage of the Demeter − Göran Lundström; M3GAN − Adrien Morot and Kathy Tse/Morot FX Studios
Best Costume Design	Best Cinematography
Poor Things − Holly Waddington; The First Omen − Paco Delgado; Immaculate − Lisa Crescioli; Late Night with the Devil − Steph Hooke; Lisa Frankenstein − Meagan McLaughlin	Poor Things − Robbie Ryan; The First Omen − Aaron Morton; I Saw the TV Glow − Eric K. Yue; In a Violent Nature − Pierce Derks; Infinity Pool − Karim Hussain
Best Documentary Feature	Best Video Game
The Legacy of the Texas Chain Saw Massacre − Directed by Phillip Escott; Dario Argento: Panico − Directed by Simone Scafidi; Satan Wants You − Directed by Sean Horlor and Steve J. Adams; Sharksploitation − Directed by Stephen Scarlata; We Kill for Love − Directed by Anthony Penta	The Texas Chain Saw Massacre − Sumo Digital; Alan Wake 2 − Remedy Entertainment; Dead Space Remake − Motive Studio; Killer Klowns from Outer Space: The Game − IllFonic and Teravision Games; Resident Evil 4 Remake − Capcom
Best Series	Best Non-Fiction Series or Miniseries
The Last of Us (HBO); Chucky (Syfy); The Fall of the House of Usher (Netflix); Interview with the Vampire (AMC); Yellowjackets (Showtime)	The Last Drive-in with Joe Bob Briggs (Shudder); Amityville: An Origin Story (MGM+); The Boulet Brothers' Dragula season 5 (Shudder); The Enfield Poltergeist (Apple TV+); Svengoolie (MeTV)
Best Felissa Rose Movie	Best Kill
Craving as Les; The Forest Hills as Dr. Gonzalez; Go Away as Aunt Mary; The New Hands as Dr. Pretorius; The Omicron Killer as Edie Schaefer/Necromancer	The Yoga Kill – In a Violent Nature
Editorial Eye on the Future Award
Dewayne Perkins − The Blackening; Dusty Gannon − Vision Video

- List of winners:
- List of nominees:
- Announced on: July 8, 2024
- Presented on: October 13, 2024

== Presenters ==
- Madeleine McGraw — presented Best Supporting Performance
- Alice Maio Mackay — presented Best First Feature
- Biqtch Puddin' and Akela Cooper — presented Best Non-Fiction Series or Miniseries
- Lachlan Watson — presented Best Documentary Feature
- Alec Gillis and Dane DiLiegro — presented Best Creature FX
- Michael Carbonaro — presented Best Make-Up FX
- Throb Zombie — presented Best Costume Design
- Michael Gingold — introduced Elric Kane and Dr. Rebekah McKendry
- Larry Fessenden — presented Best Video Game
- Dewayne Perkins — presented Best Cinematography
- Spencer Charnas — presented Best Score
- Peaches Christ and Thomas Dekker — introduced Felissa Rose
- Felissa Rose — presented Best Felissa Rose Movie
- Tiffany Shepis — presented Best Series
- Phil Nobile Jr. — presented Editorial Eye on the Future Award
- Brea Grant and Tananarive Due — presented Best Screenplay
- Gigi Saul Guerrero — presented Best International Movie
- Johnny Berchtold — presented Best Limited Release
- Catherine Corcoran and Alejandro Brugués — presented Best Streaming Premiere
- Chelsea Rebacca and James A. Janisse — presented Best Kill
- Lauren LaVera — presented Best Lead Performance
- Fede Álvarez — presented Best Director
- Skeet Ulrich — presented Best Wide Release
