= Sara Boustany =

Lebanese-American actress (born 2003)

- سارة بستاني
- Boustany in a 2026 photo shoot
- Born: Florida
- Citizenship: Lebanon; United States
- Occupation: Actress
- Years active: 2019–present
- Known for: The Body

Sara Boustany is a Lebanese-American actress. She began her television career on Pen15 (2019) and Dolly Parton's Heartstrings (2019), and made her feature film debut in Hello, Beautiful (2025). She gained wide recognition for her breakout starring role as Elise Zakaria in the Netflix coming-of-age thriller series The Body (2026).

== Early life ==
Boustany was born in Florida, though she left shortly after birth and spent much of her upbringing in Lebanon, where her family lives. She also spent part of her teenage years in Dubai before moving to Los Angeles to pursue an acting career.

According to her Netflix biography, her childhood obsession was the "Rose Jam" shower gel from Lush Cosmetics, and she "always either talks too much or too little." In an interview, Sara revealed that she had studied Behavioral Sciences before joining the cast of The Body.

== Career ==
Boustany had the recurring guest star role of Miranda in Hulu series Pen15 (2019). She also appeared in a lead role in Netflix anthology series Dolly Parton's Heartstrings, portraying a fourteen year-old Lucy Jane, later played by Sarah Shahi. She joined the cast of Ziad H. Hamzeh film Hello, Beautiful in April 2024.

In October 2025, Boustany was cast in The Body, a 2004-set Catholic school supernatural thriller created by Quinn Shephard for Netflix. Boustany initially auditioned for the lead role of Anya Butler, but casting director Jennifer Venditti pivoted after seeing her tape, casting her as Elise Zakaria, the sharp-tongued co-captain of the school's dance team who is in love with her best friend, Anya (played by Kristina Bogic). Cast just weeks before production began, she prepared for the role by participating in an eight-week dance bootcamp and drawing inspiration from Angelina Jolie's performance in Girl, Interrupted. She also noted that filming the series' intense screaming scenes caused recurring vocal strain afterward.

== Filmography ==
=== Television ===
Year	Title	Role	Notes
2019	Pen15	Miranda	2 episodes
2019	Dolly Parton's Heartstrings	Young Lucy Jane	1 episode
2026	The Body	Elise Zakaria	Lead cast

=== Films ===
Year	Title	Role	Notes
2025	Hello, Beautiful	Isabel	Main cast
