= Geena Meszaros =

Canadian actress

- Born: Geena Carling Meszaros
- Occupation: Actress
- Years active: 2015–present

Geena Carling Meszaros is a Canadian television and film actress. Her television credits include High School (2022) and Wayward (2025). She gained wide recognition for her role as Lisbeth Anderson in the Netflix coming-of-age thriller series The Body (2026).

== Career ==
From Canada, Meszaros appeared in American television series High School (2022). Her film credits include film drama The Order (2024). She portrayed the character known as 'Oatmeal Beth' in Mae Martin coming-of-age Netflix television drama series Wayward (2025).

Meszaros acted as Lisbeth in the main cast of Quinn Shephard Netflix television series The Body (2026). When auditioning for the series she described it as her dream role. In preparation for the role as a dancer, she practised seven-hour days and was part of an eight-week dance bootcamp with the cast.

== Partial filmography ==
Year	Title	Role	Notes
2022	High School	Lily	6 episodes
2024	The Order	Bonnie Sue West	
2024	Soul's Road	Ivana	
2025	In Cold Light	Older Amy	
2025	Wayward	Oatmeal Beth	5 episodes
2026	The Body	Lisbeth Anderson	Lead cast
