= Etheria Film Night =

Film festival in Los Angeles

- Genre: Film Festival - horror, fantasy, science fiction, action, and thrillers directed by women
- Founded: 2014
- Founders: Heidi Honeycutt; Stacy Pippi Hammon
- Website: www.etheriafilmnight.com

Etheria Film Night (also known as Etheria Film Festival) is an annual Los Angeles–based genre film festival for new short films by women directors. Etheria Film Night was founded in 2014 by Heidi Honeycutt, Stacy Pippi Hammon, and Kayley Viteo, former Viscera Film Festival staff members. The festival screens a curated lineup of horror, science fiction, thriller, fantasy, dark comedy, and action short films and sometimes a feature film.

== Annual showcase ==
- 2014: On July 12, 2014, the showcase screened the Los Angeles premieres of Rose McGowan's directorial debut Dawn and Axelle Carolyn's feature directorial debut Soulmate at The Egyptian Theatre in Hollywood, California. Other films included Danis Goulet's (director of Night Raiders) Wakening, Gigi Saul Guerrero's Dia de los Muertos, Rebecca Thomson's The Jelly Wrestler, Kayoko Asakura's Hide and Seek, Sarah Doyle's You Me & Her (Audience Award Winner), and Julia Walter's Job Interview (Jury Award Winner).
- 2015: On June 13, 2015, the showcase screened Ursula Dabrowsky's feature horror Inner Demon at The Egyptian Theatre in Hollywood, California. Other films included Mara Tasker's Sheila Scorned, Gigi Saul Guerrero's El Gigante, Martha Goddard's Gödel Incomplete, Chloe Okuno's Slut (Audience Award Winner), Arantxa Echevarria's (director of Carmen & Lola) De noche ye de pronto (Jury Award Winner), and Amber Benson's SheVenge.
- 2016: On June 11, 2016, the showcase screened Anna Biller's The Love Witch at The Aero Theatre in Santa Monica, California. Other films included Kerry Yang's Genghis Khan Conquers the Moon, Stephanie Cabdevila's Bionic Girl, Christine Boylan's HOSS, Olga Osorio's reStart, Toy Lei's Boxer, Jill Gevargizian's The Stylist (Audience and Jury Award Winner), Mindy Bledsoe's (director of The In-Between) Hard Broads, Jacqueline Castel's The Puppet Man, and Prano Bailey-Bond's Nasty (the short version of Censor).
- 2017: On June 3, 2017, the showcase screened Roseanne Liang's (director of Shadow in the Cloud) Do No Harm (Audience Award Winner), Olga Osorio's Einstein-Rosen, Tara Price's Earworm, Bridget Savage Cole's (director of Blow the Man Down) Swell (Jury Award Winner), Norma Vila's Jules D, Ruth Pickett's The Honeymoon, Cameo Wood's Real Artists, and Thirati Kulyingwattanavit's Kumal at The Egyptian Theatre in Hollywood, California.
- 2018: On June 16, 2018, the showcase screened Jocelyn Stamat's Laboratory Conditions (Audience and Jury Award Winner), Tammy Riley Smith's Lady M, Devi Snively's Bride of Frankie, Natalie Erika Smith's (director of Relic) Creswick, Elizabeth Serra's Skin Deep, Maria Alice Alida's Instinct, Cidney Hue's OVUM, Naledi Jackson's The Drop-In, Macarena Montero's The Agency, and Anca Vlasan's C U Later Tuesday.
- 2019: On June 29, 2019, the showcase screened Mariama Diallo's Hair Wolf, Mai Nakanishi's Hana, S.K. Reimer's Bitten, Jessica Sanders' End of the Line, Chelsea Lupkin's Lucy's Tale, Stephanie Cabdevila's Atomic Spot, Ivy Liao's Cupid's Paradise, Elaine Mungeon's Good Morning, and Gigi Saul Guerrero's feature film from the Blumhouse Hulu series Into the Dark: Culture Shock.
- 2020: On June 19, 2020, the showcase screened Carlyn Hudson's Waffle, Mia'kate Russell's Maggie May, Yoko Okumura's Basic Witch, Bears Rebecca Fonte's Conversion Therapist, Myrte Ouwerkerk's Offbeat, Alexandria Perez''s The Final Girl Returns, Taryn O’Neill's Live, Kelli Breslin's Man in the Corner, and Ursula Ellis' Ava in the End. Due to the 2020 COVID-19 quarantine, the films were screened on Shudder (streaming service) from June 19 through July 20, 2020 rather than at a live event.
- 2021: On June 25, 2021, the showcase screened Kelsey Bollig's The Fourth Wall, Anna Chazelle's Narrow, Monica Mateo's You Will Never Be Back, Katy Erin's Bootstrapped, Ciani Rey Walker's Misfits, Myra Aquino's The Gray, Aislinn Clarke's Eye Exam, and Astrid Thorvaldsen's Who Goes There? Due to the 2020 COVID-19 quarantine, the films were screened on Shudder (streaming service) from June 25 through July 25, 2021 with a screening in Kansas City, Missouri on June 26.
- 2022: On June 18, 2022, the showcase screened live at the Los Feliz theater in Los Angeles, California. The showcase also aired on Shudder (streaming service) from June 19 to July 19, 2022. The official selections were A.K. Espada's This is Our Home, Annalise Lockhart's Inheritance, Lucía Forner Segarra's Dana, Deanna Milligan's Lucid, Camille Hollett-French's FREYA, Millicent Malcolm's The Familiars, and Mercedes Bryce Morgan's Come F*ck My Robot. On July 1, 2022, the showcase was screened in Kansas City, Missouri at the Screeland Armour theater.
- 2023: On July 1, 2023, the showcase screened live at the Screenland Armour Theater in Kansas City, Missouri. The showcase also aired on Shudder (streaming service) from July 1 to July 31, 2023. The official selections were Meg Swertlow's No Overnight Parking, Jennifer Zhang's Autopilot, Alix Austin's Sucker, Genevieve Kertesz's The Erl King, Zooey Martinson's Incomplete, Mai Nakanishi's Border, Natalie Metzger's Sleep Study, Samantha Aldana's Angels, Nikki Taylor-Roberts' Go to Bed Raymond, and Chelsea Gonzalez's Make the Call.

== Inspiration Award ==
The Etheria Film Night Inspiration Award, presented at the annual premiere, honors notable women in genre film. Lexi Alexander received the award in 2014, Jane Espenson received the award in 2015, Jackie Kong received the award in 2016, Stephanie Rothman received the award in 2017 (presented by Roger Corman), Rachel Talalay received the award in 2018 (presented by John Waters). Gale Anne Hurd received the award in 2019 (presented by Roger Corman). In 2021, Angela Kang received the award (presented by Hurd). The 2022 Etheria Inspiration Award was presented to previous Etheria filmmaker Gigi Saul Guerrero onstage at the live screening. The 2023 Etheria Inspiration award was presented to Brinke Stevens onstage at the live screening by Joe Bob Briggs.

== Alumni ==
Notable alumni include Mercedes Bryce Morgan, Jacqueline Castel, Mia'kate Russell, Yoko Okumura, Chloe Okuno, Gigi Saul Guerrero, Prano Bailey-Bond, Axelle Carolyn, Bridget Savage Cole, Anna Chazelle, Mariama Diallo, Roseanne Liang, Natalie Erika Smith, Danis Goulet, Mindy Bledsoe, Amelia Moses, Jill Gevargizian, Arantxa Echevarría, Taryn O'Neill, Bola Ogun, Kayoko Asakura, and Christine Boylan.

== See also ==
- List of women's film festivals
