= Kristina Bogic =

Australian actress and singer (born 2007)

- Born: 18 January 2007 (age 19); Point Cook, Australia
- Education: Homeschooled
- Occupations: Actress; singer
- Years active: 2020–present
- Known for: The Body

Kristina Bogic (born 18 January 2007) is an Australian actress and singer.

== Career ==
Born in Point Cook, Victoria, Australia, to a Serbian father and an English mother, Bogic began singing at the age of four and playing piano at the age of eight. By the time she turned nine, she had written her first song. She released her first single, Learn My Limits (2020), at the age of twelve. That year, Bogic won the Wyndham Rising Stars Competition and won an artist development recording package through Universal School of Music. She also wanted to be a Burlesque dancer and was a keen swimmer before a shoulder injury limited her participation.

Bogic began her acting career by portraying the eponymous character in the Australian television series Playing Gracie Darling (2025).

In 2026, she acted as Anya, the lead character of Quinn Shephard's Netflix television series The Body (2026), the captain of the Lions who is terrified of the intense feelings she’s developing for her best friend Elise (Sara Boustany) . In preparation for the role, she and the cast participated in an eight-week dance bootcamp.

== Filmography ==
Year	Title	Role	Notes
2025	Playing Gracie Darling	Gracie Darling	6 episodes
2025	Howl	Lila	Short film
2026	The Body	Anya Butler	Lead cast
