= Hello Beautiful (film) =

- Theatrical poster
- Directed by: Ziad H. Hamzeh
- Written by: Ziad H. Hamzeh
- Produced by: Ziad H. Hamzeh; Michael Espinosa; Christine Handy; Timothy Danis
- Starring: Tricia Helfer; Tarek Bishara; Sara Boustany; Liam Anderson; Susan Shalhoub Larkin; Lisa Marcos; Sadie Stratton; Olivia Gilliatt; Sayed Badreya; Natacha Ellie
- Cinematography: Terrence Hayes
- Edited by: David Nevins
- Music by: Marco Werba
- Distributed by: Freestyle Releasing
- Release dates: April 1, 2025 (Beverly Hills Film Festival); September 25, 2026 (United States)
- Running time: 100 minutes
- Country: United States
- Languages: English; Arabic

Hello Beautiful is a 2025 American drama film written, and directed by Ziad H. Hamzeh, and starring Tricia Helfer. The film tells a deeply emotional and inspiring story of resilience, love, and self-discovery, following a supermodel’s battle with breast cancer at the height of her career. The film premiered at Beverly Hills Film Festival in 2025, where it won the Golden Palm Award.

== Synopsis ==
Willow Adair, a celebrated model enjoying the peak of her success, is suddenly diagnosed with breast cancer—sending her world into upheaval. As she navigates illness and personal loss, Willow embarks on a transformative journey of heartbreak, hope, and self-acceptance. Through moments of despair and triumph, she comes to understand what truly matters: the courage to fight, the grace to let go, and the power of embracing oneself. The film explores the resilience of the human spirit, the unbreakable bonds of love, and the courage it takes to rise when life falls apart.

== Cast ==
- Tricia Helfer as Willow Boutrous
- Tarek Bishara as Khalil
- Sara Boustany as Isabel
- Liam Anderson as Alex
- Susan Shalhoub Larkin as Maryam
- Lisa Marcos as Grace
- Sadie Stratton as Maggie
- Olivia Gilliatt as Gigi
- Sayed Badreya as Malek
- Natacha Ellie as Alika

== Reception ==
On Rotten Tomatoes, the film has an approval rating of 70% based on reviews from 10 critics. Terry Sherwood of Film Threat said, " Hello Beautiful delivers the raw clarity it’s been reaching for all along. This is a film about inspiration and helping others who perhaps are suffering from this insidious disease."
