= Heidi Honeycutt =

American film journalist and actress

Heidi Honeycutt is an American journalist, author, actress, filmmaker, film programmer, and co-founder of the Los Angeles-based Etheria Film Night, a film festival that showcases short films by women directors. She established the festival in 2014 with Stacy Pippi Hammon, and serves as its Director of Programming. Honeycutt and Hammon had previously run the Viscera Film Festival alongside Shannon Lark. As a journalist, Honeycutt has written for such magazines as Fangoria and Famous Monsters of Filmland.

In 2007, Honeycutt wrote, produced, and starred in the short film Wretched, which she also co-directed with Leslie Delano. She also appeared as herself in the horror mockumentary, The Once and Future Smash. In 2024, she served as jury president of the International Short Film Competition award ceremony at the 28th Fantasia International Film Festival.

== Partial bibliography ==
- "A Century of Mädchen: Femmes and Frauen in Fascist, New Wave, and Contemporary European Cinema", in Kelly, Gabrielle; Robson, Cheryl (eds.)'s Celluloid Ceiling: Women Film Directors Breaking Through (2014). Supernova Books. ISBN 978-0956632906.
- I Spit on Your Celluloid: The History of Women Directing Horror Movies (2024). Headpress Books. ISBN 978-1-915316-29-5.
