= High School (American TV series) =

2022 coming-of-age comedy television series

- Genre: Drama; Coming-of-age
- Based on: High School by: Tegan Quin; Sara Quin
- Developed by: Clea DuVall; Tegan Quin; Sara Quin
- Written by: Clea DuVall; Laura Kittrell
- Directed by: Clea DuVall; Rebecca Asher
- Starring: Railey Gilliland; Seazynn Gilliland; Esther McGregor; Olivia Rouyre; Amanda Fix; Brianne Tju; Cobie Smulders; Kyle Bornheimer; Jayne Eastwood; Geena Meszaros
- Composer: Anna Waronker
- Countries of origin: United States; Canada
- Original language: English
- No. of seasons: 1
- No. of episodes: 8

Production
- Executive producers: Laura Kittrell; Clea DuVall; Tegan Quin; Sara Quin; Brad Pitt; Dede Gardner; Jeremy Kleiner; Carina Sposato
- Producer: Leslie Cowan
- Production location: Calgary, Alberta Canada
- Cinematography: Carolina Costa; Samy Inayeh
- Editors: D. Gillian Truster; Roderick Deogrades; Orlee Buium
- Running time: 22–31 minutes
- Production companies: Reunion Pacific Entertainment; Libra Head Productions; Meridian & Bigbee Productions; Plan B Entertainment; Amazon Studios

Original release
- Network: Amazon Freevee
- Release: October 14 – October 28, 2022

High School is a coming-of-age drama television series developed by Clea DuVall and Tegan and Sara Quin, based on the 2019 memoir of the same name by the Quins. It premiered on Amazon Freevee on October 14, 2022.

== Premise ==
Through a backdrop of '90s grunge and rave culture, twin sisters navigate identity, love, & music while just trying to "find" themselves.

== Cast ==
=== Main ===
- Railey Gilliland as Tegan Quin
- Seazynn Gilliland as Sara Quin
- Esther McGregor (Note: Credited only in the episodes they appear.) as Natalie
- Olivia Rouyre as Phoebe
- Amanda Fix as Maya
- Brianne Tju as Ali
- Cobie Smulders (Note: Credited as "Special Guest Star" in the end credits.) as Simone Bates
- Kyle Bornheimer as Patrick Twiley
- Jayne Eastwood as June
- Geena Meszaros as Lily

=== Recurring ===
- CJ Valleroy as Evan
- Christian Humphries as Andrew
- Dom Bergeron as Will
- Nikki Rae Hallow as Loni
- Nate Corddry as David

== Episodes ==
No.	Title	Directed by	Teleplay by	Original release date
1	"I Bet It Stung"	Clea DuVall	Clea DuVall	October 14, 2022
2	"Shock To Your System"	Clea DuVall	Clea DuVall	October 14, 2022
3	"Hang On to the Night"	Clea DuVall	Clea DuVall	October 14, 2022
4	"Welcome Home"	Rebecca Asher	Laura Kittrell	October 14, 2022
5	"Freedom"	Rebecca Asher	Clea DuVall	October 21, 2022
6	"Hello, I'm Right Here"	Clea DuVall	Laura Kittrell	October 21, 2022
7	"Fix You Up"	Clea DuVall	Clea DuVall	October 28, 2022
8	"The Con"	Clea DuVall	Laura Kittrell	October 28, 2022

== Production ==
=== Development ===
On October 20, 2020, it was announced that Amazon Studios' free ad-supported streaming service IMDb TV was developing a project based on identical twin indie pop duo Tegan and Sara Quin's eponymous 2019 memoir. Clea DuVall was attached to create and direct the pilot episode, as well as executive produce alongside the Quin sisters. The series is produced by Plan B Entertainment under their overall deal at Amazon Studios. At Amazon's first NewFront presentation on May 3, 2021, it was announced that IMDb TV had given the project a series order.

=== Casting ===
On March 17, 2022, Railey and Seazynn Gilliland were cast as the leads, while Cobie Smulders and Kyle Bornheimer were set to guest star in the show.

=== Filming ===
On March 17, 2022, it was reported that principal photography was set to begin on March 21 in Alberta, Canada.

== Reception ==
In advance of its official Amazon premiere, the series received a preview screening in the Primetime program at the 2022 Toronto International Film Festival.

The review aggregator website Rotten Tomatoes reported a 100% approval rating with an average rating of 7.4/10, based on 22 critic reviews. The website's critics consensus reads, "High School is as effervescent and sensitive as a Tegan and Sara album, delivering a highly specific coming of age comedy that rings with universal truth."

Metacritic gave the series a weighted average score of 82 out of 100 based on 10 critic reviews, indicating "universal acclaim".

On Rolling Stone's list of the 20 Best TV Shows of 2022, it was named as the 7th Best.

On The New York Times' list of Best TV Shows 2022, the show was listed 5th.
