= Talking to a Stranger (film) =

2026 Mexican Horror Film

- Spanish: Hablando con extraños
- Directed by: Adrián Garcia Bogliano
- Written by: Adrián Garcia Bogliano
- Starring: Gigi Saul Guerrero; Yago Andreu Sandoval
- Cinematography: Damián Aguilar
- Edited by: Adrián Garcia Bogliano
- Music by: Fernando Escalante; Ricardo López Coa
- Production companies: Corazón Films; Mórbido Group; Prismaticoos Films
- Release date: February 2, 2026 (Rotterdam)
- Running time: 103 minutes
- Country: Mexico
- Language: Spanish

Talking to a Stranger (Spanish: Hablando con extraños) is a 2026 Mexican horror film written and directed by Adrián Garcia Bogliano and starring Gigi Saul Guerrero, Eugenio Rubio and Yago Andreu Sandoval.

== Plot ==
Patricia is a mother struggling with the death of her son, Chris. When he begins to reappear, her reality becomes overwhelmingly ambiguous while her husband Andrés struggles to keep their family together.

== Cast ==
- Gigi Saul Guerrero as Patricia
- Eugenio Rubio as Andrés
- Yago Andreu Sandoval as Chris
- Tatiana del Real as Sarah
- Vania Garcia as Hanna

== Production ==
The film was announced in April 2025 in collaboration with Corazón Films, Mórbido Group and Prismaticoos Films and was shot entirely in Guadalajara. It marked the first leading role for Guerrero, who is best known for her directing.

== Reception ==
Its world premiere was at the International Film Festival Rotterdam on February 2, 2026 and its Canadian premiere was at the Vancouver Horror Show on October 16, 2026.

Max Borg praised Guerrero's performance as, "a force of nature, an avatar of pure, raw pain".
