= The Body (TV series) =

American television series

- Release poster
- Genre: Coming-of-age; Psychological drama; Supernatural horror
- Created by: Quinn Shephard
- Showrunners: Gina Gammell; Quinn Shephard
- Starring: Kristina Bogic; Sara Boustany; Geena Meszaros; Nnamdi Asomugha; Louisa Krause; Shirley Chen; Jackson Kelly; Sofia Wylie
- Composer: Christopher Stracey
- Country of origin: United States
- Original language: English
- No. of series: 1
- No. of episodes: 8

Production
- Executive producers: Amy Israel; Peter Chernin; Josh Stern; Riley Keough; Gina Gammell; Sacha Ben Harroche; M. Blair Breard; Lisa Harrison
- Cinematography: Isiah Donté Lee; Wyatt Garfield; Bobby Shore
- Editors: Danielle L. Statuto; Adrienne McNally; Alex O'Flinn; Agustín Rexach Martín; Robert Grigsby Wilson; Daniel Morfesis
- Production companies: The North Road Company; Ingénue Productions; Felix Culpa

Original release
- Network: Netflix
- Release: November 11, 2026

The Body is an American coming-of-age psychological drama horror series created by Quinn Shephard. The series premiered on Netflix on November 11, 2026, and received generally positive reviews from critics.

== Premise ==
On Halloween night in 2004, a group of Catholic schoolgirls throw a party at an abandoned convent, take ecstasy, and perform a mock Satanic ritual in which they jokingly offer one of their classmates as a virgin sacrifice. After the girl falls into a coma, the others begin experiencing what they believe to be prophetic visions of her, triggering mass hysteria that spreads throughout their school and community.

== Cast ==
=== Main ===
- Kristina Bogic as Anya Butler, the socially-hypervigilant Queen Bee, most popular girl at St. Mark's Catholic School, and the head captain of the school's dance team, the Lions. In addition to managing her guilt and paranoia over the incident on Halloween with Grace, Anya is closeted and is fighting to suppress her romantic feelings for her best friend and co-captain, Elise.
- Sara Boustany as Elise Zakaria, the sharp-tongued and unapologetic co-captain of the Lions. She is also Anya's best friend and crush. Elise is in love with Anya and actively seeks a genuine romantic relationship with her.
- Geena Meszaros as Lisbeth Anderson, a misfit loner and daughter of fundamentalist Christian snake-handlers, who joins the Lions by default when Grace is incapacitated. Lisbeth's involvement in the Halloween incident initially brings her closer to Anya, but she soon crosses the line from helping Anya to blackmailing her.
- Nnamdi Asomugha as Father Sam Franklin, the priest and Headmaster of St Mark's Catholic School and Grace's uncle.
- Louisa Krause as Catherine Anderson, Lisbeth's and Leo's mother
- Shirley Chen as Maddie Delaney, a member of the Lions dance team
- Jackson Kelly as Leo Anderson, Lisbeth's brother.
- Sofia Wylie as Grace Franklin, a new member of the Lions dance team

=== Recurring ===
- Kyra Pierce as Bailey Bradley
- Phallon Pierce as Brit Bradley
- Marcel Ruiz as Tyler Flores
- Orlando Norman as Steven Maxwell
- Gabby Windey as Coach Shauna Miller
- Ashley Madekwe as Theresa Franklin
- Motell Foster as Michael
- Benjamin Powles as Swim Team Boy
- Anna Tierney as Melanie Butler
- Chloe Longname as Eden
- Sarah Abbott as Olivia
- Emily Roman as Claire
- Michela Luci as Amy
- Bella Neuspiel as Katie Fraser
- Julia Lowe as Blair
- Christine Solomon as Salma

== Production ==
=== Development ===
The series was created by Quinn Shephard, who also serves as showrunner alongside Gina Gammell, and director of some episodes, including the pilot. Executive producers on the series for the North Road Company, Chernin Entertainment and Felix Culpa include Amy Israel, Peter Chernin, and Josh Stern as well as Riley Keough, Gina Gammell, and Sacha Ben Harroche. The eight-episode series was ordered by Netflix in May 2025.

=== Casting ===
In October 2025, it was announced that Kristina Bogic, Sara Boustany, Geena Meszaros, Nnamdi Asomugha, Louisa Krause, Shirley Chen, Jackson Kelly, and Sofia Wylie had been cast as series regulars, while Kyra Pierce, Phallon Pierce, Marcel Ruiz, Orlando Norman, Gabby Windey, Ashley Madekwe, Motell Foster, Cale Ambrozic, Anna Tierney, Chloe Longname, Sarah Abbott, Emily Roman, Michela Luci, Bella Neuspiel, Julia Lowe, and Christine Solomon joined the series in recurring roles.

=== Filming ===
Principal photography took place in Canada in late 2025, with filming locations including Dundas, Ontario.

== Episodes ==
No.	Title	Directed by	Written by	Original release date
1	"Slutty God"	Quinn Shephard	Quinn Shephard	November 11, 2026
On Halloween 2004, at St. Mark's Catholic High School, devout Catholic Grace Franklin and new girl Lisbeth Anderson audition for a spot on the school's dance team, the Lions, to replace injured dancer Maddie. Grace is ultimately picked by team captains Anya and Elise. As part of her initiation, the Lions invite Grace to a Halloween party at an old convent nicknamed "Devil's House". Anya also invites Lisbeth after Lisbeth lets her copy answers during a test. While Grace and Lisbeth's brother Leo are studying, Grace finds a drawing in Leo's sketchbook that horrifies her, and she tells him to leave. At the party, the Lions consume ecstasy as the "body of Satan" and jokingly offer up Grace as a virgin sacrifice in exchange for success at their regional dance competition. Anya and Elise become sexually intimate, but Anya pulls away when Elise tries to kiss her on the mouth and denies being attracted to women. Lisbeth and Leo show up to the party. As Anya talks to Lisbeth outside, she sees Grace seizing on the ground and asks Lisbeth to help bring her to the hospital, taking her boyfriend Steven's car to do so. However, Grace's heart stops on the way, and Lisbeth and Anya assume she is dead. Not knowing what else to do, the two drive to Grace's house and place her body in bed, as though she'd arrived home safely. Lisbeth dons Grace's new Lions jacket, and as she imagines herself dancing on the team, Grace unexpectedly begins breathing again.
2	"Jesus, Literally"	Quinn Shephard	Quinn Shephard	November 11, 2026
Leo finds Grace's unconscious body and calls an ambulance. Grace is diagnosed as being in a coma, and Lisbeth lies that Leo and Grace were dating to explain his presence at the house. Father Franklin comforts his brother Michael, Grace's father, and begins investigating her condition and questions Leo, offending Leo and Lisbeth's mother Catherine. Over the next days, Anya tries to limit the fallout from the party by insisting the team keeps the party secret, straining her relationship with Elise. Lisbeth blackmails Anya into giving her Grace's spot on the Lions. A suspicious Elise arranges for Lisbeth's initiation to be at a strip club. Anya experiences recurring visions of Grace. When she brings the team outside, a fight erupts among the girls. Maddie admits to Lisbeth that the team chanted to Satan before initiating Grace. Later that night, Maddie collapses. Grace's father learns that Grace had no drugs in her system, and Father Franklin finds Leo's drawing depicting Grace naked and bound.
3	"Unholy Thoughts"	Kevin Phillips	Stuti Malhotra	November 11, 2026
Leo's drawing of Grace is revealed to resemble Francisco de Zurbarán's Agnus Dei painting. Maddie tells the rest of the Lions that Grace's bloodwork came back clean. After several members report visions of Grace, the Lions vote on whether to reveal their drug use; everyone except Maddie and Olivia agrees to remain silent. Elise confronts Tyler about the drugs, and in response, Tyler swallows the remaining pills. Catherine suddenly barges into the school in the midst of a psychotic break, exposes herself to the students, and drops Leo's drawing, which quickly spreads throughout the school. During class, Maddie asks if it is possible to contact the Devil. Father Franklin meets with Leo to discuss the drawings of Grace and attempts to coax a confession out of him, but Leo refuses to confess, prompting Father Franklin to leave abruptly. The Lions visit Grace at the hospital and discuss whether their visions indicate a haunting. Meanwhile, the swim team, led by Steven, hazes Leo by dunking him in the pool repeatedly, demanding to know what he did to Grace. Leo breaks down in tears and admits that his drawings were attempts to rid himself of impure thoughts about Grace. Father Franklin intervenes and absolves Leo of his sins. Later during a service, Elise fakes a vision of Grace and pretends to seize on the ground. As Father Franklin carries her out, she winks at Anya.
4	"I Saw Grace Franklin with the Devil"	Kevin Phillips	Julian Breece	November 11, 2026
Elise describes her "vision" to the rest of the team, which Anya corroborates. Elise goes to other members of the Lions to investigate whether Anya manipulated the vote to admit Lisbeth to the team, and learns during detention that Lisbeth was also at the Halloween party. She then forces her way into the Andersons' home, demanding to speak to Lisbeth while Leo protests. The twins Bailey and Brit both have visions of Grace. Steven tries to discuss Anya's sexual anxiety with her, and at his suggestion, she attempts to masturbate, flipping back and forth between images of Steven and Elise. While the Lions are talking about Grace on AIM, Father Franklin, using Grace's computer, accidentally joins the group chat, startling the team into thinking Grace is awake. After Anya invites Lisbeth over to her house, Lisbeth secretly prints all of the group chat's messages. Elise invites Leo to study with her, and the two bond over their different religious upbringings and the deaths of their respective fathers. Under the guise of seducing him, Elise steals a videotape of the Andersons' former congregation from their house; to her horror, the tape depicts Lisbeth and her father handling rattlesnakes to convince the churchgoers of the power of God. Anya and Lisbeth make plans to bring the Lions to Anya's country house for the weekend to rehearse their routine. Lisbeth annotates the printed group chat messages, seemingly in preparation. At the hospital, Catherine tampers with Grace's medical equipment while telling her to "go back to hell."
5	"Faking It"	Gina Gammell	Catherine Schetina	November 11, 2026
Grace survives the incident in her hospital room and experiences seizure-like movements. Medical staff discover that her feeding tube has been disconnected, but tests show no seizure activity. Grace begins breathing independently, although she remains unresponsive. Her mother, Theresa, returns, and the family subsequently brings Grace home from the hospital. Meanwhile, the Lions travel to Anya's country house to rehearse for their regional dance competition. Elise warns Anya about Lisbeth's family's involvement in a snake-handling religious sect, but Anya dismisses her concerns. After Steven and several other boys arrive with alcohol and drugs, the rehearsal weekend turns into a party. While under the influence of hallucinogenic mushrooms, Maddie becomes convinced that Grace is possessed and demands that the team attempt an exorcism. Lisbeth leads the ritual, while Father Franklin separately prays over Grace at her home. Using information from the team's private online conversations, Lisbeth pressures the girls into confessing their sins. Anya develops a nosebleed and leaves the ritual, later experiencing a vision of Grace while having sex with Steven. When Elise admits that she fabricated her earlier vision, Lisbeth turns the other girls against her, and they physically restrain Elise. Later that night, a snake appears inside the house, which Lisbeth kills with an axe. The other girls blame Elise for the incident, prompting her to leave. The following morning, Lisbeth receives her official Lions jacket, but Maddie discovers that her injured leg has inexplicably healed.
6	"Star Quality"	Quinn Shephard	Quinn Shephard & Lily Houghton	November 11, 2026
With her injured leg seemingly healed, Maddie returns to the Lions' competitive lineup, leaving Lisbeth as an alternate at regionals. Coach Miller assigns Anya and Elise to share a hotel room in the hope of repairing their friendship. Elise shows Anya a videotape of Lisbeth participating in snake-handling religious ceremonies, raising further suspicions about her past. Meanwhile, Lisbeth learns of Maddie's history of disordered eating and begins exploiting her religious guilt, convincing her that restricting food will purify her of an inner demon. Anya and Elise grow closer while discussing Lisbeth's behavior and Anya's recurring visions of Grace. They perform an improvised dance together that nearly ends in a kiss, and later have sex in their hotel room. Back home, Leo attributes Catherine's apparent recovery from her mental health crisis to Grace's miraculous powers. As stories of supernatural healings spread, townspeople begin visiting Grace's house seeking miracles. During a church service, Coach Miller unexpectedly goes into premature labor and subsequently credits Grace with saving her baby. At the competition, Maddie becomes weak after severely restricting her food intake. Anya persuades her to eat, but Lisbeth subsequently pressures Maddie into spitting out the food. During the Lions' performance, Maddie collapses during a lift and claims to have seen Grace in the audience. The team is eventually allowed to perform again, with Lisbeth taking Maddie's place.
7	"Holy Trinity"	Gina Gammell	Story by : Naledi Jackson; Teleplay by : Naledi Jackson and Julian Breece	November 11, 2026
The Lions return from regionals having placed third and qualified for nationals. However, Maddie may require ankle surgery after collapsing during the competition, raising questions about her apparent healing. Meanwhile, increasing numbers of townspeople gather outside Grace's house seeking divine intervention. Catherine announces that she intends to return to West Virginia and expels Lisbeth from the family home when she refuses to accompany her. Lisbeth moves into Anya's house, where she discovers that Elise has stolen a videotape of her former congregation. She subsequently reveals that her father died after being bitten by a rattlesnake during a religious ceremony, explaining that the congregation relied on prayer instead of seeking medical treatment and that Catherine blamed his death on Lisbeth's lack of faith. Elsewhere, Steven discovers Grace's necklace inside his car, leading him to fear that he may have been involved in her condition despite having no memory of the incident. Tyler persuades him to conceal the discovery and disposes of the necklace. Maddie quits the Lions and tells Father Franklin in confession that the team took ecstasy at the Halloween party. Bound by the confidentiality of confession, Father Franklin later persuades Maddie to discuss the incident outside the confessional, although she maintains that Grace returned home by herself. Anya and Elise continue their secret relationship, but Elise grows frustrated by Anya's refusal to break up with Steven. During a gathering at Anya's house, Elise and Lisbeth get into a violent confrontation in the swimming pool. Later, Anya kisses Elise in front of Steven and invites him to join them, upsetting Elise, who leaves the hot tub. Anya and Elise later reconcile and have sex, unaware that Lisbeth witnesses them.
8	"Coming Out"	Quinn Shephard	Catherine Schetina & Greta Heinemann	November 11, 2026
Following Maddie's revelations, Father Franklin individually questions the Lions about the Halloween party. Although several girls acknowledge the drug use, Lisbeth denies her involvement, while suspicion increasingly falls on Elise. During her questioning, Elise recalls seeing Steven driving back toward the Halloween party, prompting suspicion that he may have been involved in bringing Grace home. Meanwhile, Anya's mother discovers photographs of women kissing on Anya's computer and mistakenly assumes that Lisbeth is a lesbian. Lisbeth subsequently attempts to blackmail Anya, demanding weekly payments and accommodation for herself and Leo in exchange for keeping Anya's secrets. As the town's belief in Grace's miraculous abilities intensifies, a bishop visits the Franklin family and expresses interest in promoting Grace as a potential saint, despite Father Franklin's concerns about the circumstances surrounding her condition. At a debutante ball, Elise deduces that Anya and Lisbeth were responsible for bringing Grace home after the Halloween party. Steven, who fears that he may have driven Grace home while intoxicated, also confronts Anya. Overwhelmed by guilt, Anya finally admits that she and Lisbeth believed Grace had died and secretly returned her to her bedroom rather than seeking help. Steven and Elise leave Anya following her confession. Elsewhere, Catherine drinks bleach while watching footage of her late husband preaching. Meanwhile, Lisbeth tells the Lions that Grace died on the way to the hospital and claims to have brought her back to life. At Grace's house, Father Franklin reveals the truth about her ecstasy consumption to the visiting clergy, while Leo, Maddie, and other believers gather outside to pray for her recovery. Anya arrives and confesses her actions on Halloween, as well as her relationship with Elise, pleading for forgiveness. As a moth lands on Grace's face, she suddenly awakens from her coma. When her family asks whether she knows her identity, Grace declares, "I am God."

== Release ==
The series premiered on Netflix on November 11, 2026.

== Reception ==
The review aggregator website Rotten Tomatoes reported an 87% approval rating with an average rating of 7.3/10, based on 31 critic reviews. The website's consensus reads: "A supernaturally queer endeavor that subverts expectations at every dance break, The Body combines religious guilt, teen hormones, great visuals, and enlivened storytelling to a holy, righteous effect". Metacritic, which uses a weighted average, assigned a score of 73 out of 100 based on 13 critics, indicating "generally favorable" reviews.

The themes touched by the series, and especially the centrality of religious horror, have sparked protests from some viewers, including a CitizenGO petition addressed to Netflix's Chief Contents Office Peter Rice advocating for the cancellation of the show, citing "blasphemous" and "anti-Christian" contents.
