= Harrison's Flowers =

2000 film by Élie Chouraqui

- United States theatrical poster
- Directed by: Élie Chouraqui
- Written by: Élie Chouraqui; Didier Le Pêcheur; Isabel Ellsen
- Based on: Le diable a l'avantage by Isabel Ellsen
- Produced by: Élie Chouraqui
- Starring: Andie MacDowell; Elias Koteas; Brendan Gleeson; Adrien Brody; David Strathairn
- Cinematography: Nicola Pecorini
- Edited by: Jacques Witta
- Music by: Bruno Coulais (international version); Cliff Eidelman (USA version)
- Production companies: StudioCanal (Le Studio Canal+); France 2 Cinéma; Sept Films Cinema
- Distributed by: Cinevia Films (France); Universal Pictures (Note: The film was originally picked up for distribution and premiered in the United States (in 2001) by Universal's niche film label Universal Focus, but eventually released in theaters by Universal itself in 2002 after the label shut down.) (United States)
- Release dates: 23 September 2000 (San Sebastián); 24 January 2001 (France); 15 March 2002 (United States)
- Running time: 127 minutes 122 minutes (USA version)
- Countries: France; United States
- Languages: English; French; Serbian; Croatian
- Budget: $8 million
- Box office: $3 million

Harrison's Flowers (French: Les Fleurs d'Harrison) is a 2000 war-romance drama film directed by Élie Chouraqui. It stars, among others, Andie MacDowell, Elias Koteas, Brendan Gleeson, Adrien Brody, Marie Trintignant, Gerard Butler and David Strathairn. The film is also Quinn Shephard's big screen debut. The film premiered at the 2000 San Sebastián International Film Festival, and released in theatres on 24 January 2001 in France. Universal Pictures gave the film a limited theatrical release in the United States on 15 March 2002. For this film's United States version, the film's length was reduced by about five minutes; it also features a new score by Cliff Eidelman.

The film only grossed $3 million in worldwide box office against $8 million production budget, and the overall critical reaction to the film was mixed. However, Adrien Brody said that this film helped him to be cast in the leading role of The Pianist (2002), for which he won the Academy Award for Best Actor. Kino Lorber Studio Classics released the film for the first time on Blu-ray on November 26, 2024.

There is a factual error in this film: the character Kyle Morris, played by Adrien Brody, says that Croats are Orthodox and Serbs are Catholic, without being contradicted.

== Plot ==
Harrison Lloyd, a Pulitzer Prize-winning Newsweek photojournalist, travels on his last assignment to the dissolving Yugoslavia in 1991, during the Croatian War of Independence. While there, he is presumed to have been killed in a building collapse. His wife Sarah travels to the region to find him, believing him to be in the city of Vukovar. Travelling through the war-torn landscape, she arrives in the city, and bears witness to the massacre which took place there. Back home, Harrison's son Cesar cares for his father's flowers in their greenhouse.

== Cast ==
- Andie MacDowell as Sarah Lloyd
- Elias Koteas as Yeager Pollack
- Brendan Gleeson as Marc Stevenson
- Adrien Brody as Kyle Morris
- David Strathairn as Harrison Lloyd
- Alun Armstrong as Samuel Brubeck
- Caroline Goodall as Johanna Pollack
- Diane Baker as Mary Francis
- Marie Trintignant as Cathy
- Christian Charmetant as Jeff
- Gerard Butler as Chris Kumac
- Quinn Shephard as Margaux Lloyd
- Scott Michael Anton as Cesar Lloyd
- Christopher Clarke as David

== Reception ==
On Rotten Tomatoes, the film has a 49% approval rating from 87 critics. The website's consensus says: "Though it presents the war in shockingly gritty, realistic terms, Harrison's Flowers uses such scenes as background for a trite love story. " Metacritic, which assigns a normalized rating, calculated an average score of 49 out of 100, based on 31 reviews.
