= Supernatural Academy =

American children's animated television series

- Genre: Fantasy
- Created by: Matthew Wexler
- Based on: Supernatural Prison series by Jaymin Eve
- Directed by: Steve Ball
- Creative director: Geoff Taylor
- Voices of: Gigi Saul Guerrero; Larissa Dias; Cardi Wong; Vincent Tong; Ali J. Eisner; Bethany Brown
- Theme music composer: John Majkut
- Opening theme: "In This World"
- Composers: Allen Bohbot (score); John Majkut (songs)
- Countries of origin: United States; Canada
- Original language: English
- No. of seasons: 1
- No. of episodes: 16

Production
- Executive producers: Jaymin Eve; Allen Bohbot; Frances Manfredi
- Producers: Mel Botranger; Jennifer Rogan; Kaaren Lee Brown
- Editor: Augustin Escoffier
- Running time: 22–23 minutes
- Production companies: ICON Creative Studio; 41 Entertainment

Original release
- Network: Peacock
- Release: January 20, 2022

Supernatural Academy is an animated fantasy television series that premiered on Peacock on January 20, 2022. It is based on the book series created by Jaymin Eve.

== Premise ==
Mischa Jackson/Lebron is a 16-year-old girl living in the human world with her mother Lienda. Her twin sister Jessa is a popular girl and Wolf-Shifter living at Supernatural Academy with her father, council leader Jonathan. Having been split up at birth, the twins have no idea of each other's existence. Mischa, in particular, has no idea of the supernatural world—populated by Shifters, Magic-Users, Faeries, Trolls, Harpies, Vampires and Mermaids—and lives as a normal teenager in modern-day New York City.

Mischa has visions of wolves, dragons and strange doors, which she draws in her notebook. Her suppressed powers are slowly awakening. Deciding that she can no longer hide and protect her daughter in the human world, Lienda reunites Mischa with her sister and father and enrolls her in Supernatural Academy.

Though they have a rocky start, the twins quickly grow to love each other and forge an unbreakable bond. As their sisterhood is tested time and again, Jessa and Mischa will need each other and their friends if they are to stand a chance against the dark forces seeking to resurrect the Dragon King.

== Voice cast and characters ==
=== Main ===
- Larissa Dias as Jessa Lebron
- Gigi Saul Guerrero as Mischa Jackson/Lebron
- Cardi Wong as Braxton Balari
- Vincent Tong as Maximus Balari
- Ali J. Eisner as Jae
- Bethany Brown as Terra Rihan

=== Recurring ===
- Alessandro Juliani as Jonathon Lebron and Mezzy
- Barbara Kottmeier as Lienda Jackson/Lebron
- Brian Drummond as Archibold Kristov
- Diana Kaarina as Santra Khubari, Nimbu Khubari, and Zadi
- Kathleen Barr as Yufon
- Shannon Chan-Kent as Elda Kristov, Shan, Opal, Carmen

== Episodes ==
No. overall	No. in season	Title	Directed by	Written by	Storyboard by	Original release date	Prod. code
1	1	"Parallel Lives Part A"	Steve Ball	Gillian Horvath	TBA	January 20, 2022	101
At Supernatural Academy, Jessa arrives barely in time for lunch. She sits with her friends Terra, Maximus, Braxton and Jae. Later, during a run through the woods, Jessa and Brax spot Headmaster Kristov catching a young boy with a Dragon-mark on his arm. Kristov conjures a door to the Cloister and takes the boy inside. Jessa and Brax are too slow to reach the door before it closes. In class, students are taught that the supernaturals have lived hidden from the human world behind cloaking spells ever since their own realm was destroyed by the Dragon-King in a big war. In the human world, Mischa skips school lunch with a friend. She has a vision of the boy and the door, which she immediately draws in her sketchbook. That night she has more nightmare visions, and damages furniture in her sleep. Meanwhile, her mother Lienda wards off an attack by a Harpy. Knowing she can no longer both hide and protect Mischa in the human world, she reluctantly takes her to the supernatural realm: there Mischa is reunited her with her twin sister Jessa and father Jonathon. The girls have been unaware of each other's existence until that moment.
2	2	"Parallel Lives Part B"	Steve Ball	Gillian Horvath	TBA	January 20, 2022	102
Mischa is admitted to Supernatural Academy and is introduced to Jessa's pack: Maximus is a Vampire, Braxton a Dragon-Shifter, Terra a Magic-user and Jae a Faerie. Mischa does not yet have wolf-shifting powers, so Jonathon has asked Jessa to keep her out of trouble. Mischa is amazed by the magical world, but soon offends a troll teacher by calling out misconceptions he has been teaching about the human world. She learns that some supernaturals cannot pass as human, and so cannot visit the human world. The girls confront their parents about why they were split up after birth. They learn that they are both Dragon-marked—like the boy Jessa saw. The Dragon-marked are kept apart from the rest of supernatural society, to protect them from the curse and to keep everyone else safe from them. Angry at their parents, the girls meet with the pack that night. With help from the pack, who remain outside, the twins break into the headmaster's office. There, Jessa steals magical travel tokens to reach the door to the Cloister. They make it out, barely, but their actions do not go unnoticed.
3	3	"In Over Their Heads Part A"	Steve Ball	Kaaren Lee Brown	TBA	January 20, 2022	103
The night after the heist, the twins visit the Hub, from where they can visit other supernatural enclaves. They find the door, but it will not open: Jessa concludes that neither of them has the correct aura to open it. The Hub has several other doors: one opens on its own, nearly dropping the girls into lava. The headmaster discovers Terra was involved in the heist and interrogates her, but she refuses to snitch. She receives a month's detention and a 30% demerit of her powers. She becomes resentful of Jessa—who seems not to care about Terra's sacrifice and to think only about Mischa—to the point where she agrees to help the spiteful Elda, the headmaster's daughter. During combat training, Terra declines to be paired with Mischa, instead suggesting a Bunny-Shifter named Chanelle. Elda uses a magic token to switch bodies with Chanelle and pushes Mischa into a lake, where she is dragged underwater by a mermaid (Opal, whom Mischa had offended on her first day).
4	4	"In Over Their Heads Part B"	Steve Ball	Kaaren Lee Brown	TBA	January 20, 2022	104
Jessa hears Mischa's thoughts, and saves her at the last moment. The healer detects a spell bound to Mischa's aura, but cannot identify it. That night, the girls' parents tell them that a powerful sorcerer friend cast the spell to conceal their Dragon-marks and to suppress Mischa's powers so she could live in the human world—it is the reason she cannot shift. The girls go back to the Hub, but this time Jae, Max and Brax insist on coming with them. Once inside the Hub, Jae curiously opens a door and is pulled through. Brax chases after them and goes through as well, and the door closes behind them. They find themselves in the destroyed Faerie realm. Entranced and entangled in vines, Jae voluntarily starts giving up their magical power to the realm, which uses it to renew itself. Brax tries to free them, but the vines fight him off. Meanwhile, in the Hub, the others try vainly to open the door to reach their friends, but eventually give up and appeal to adults for help. Nobody can get through until, finally, a troll teacher manages to open the door. Brax snatches Jae and the two get out with not a moment to spare. Headmaster Kristov gives each of Jessa, Brax, Max and Terra 60% demerits for recklessness—but not Mischa, who has no magical power—but does not expel them. He announces that the Hub is off limits, on pain of expulsion.
5	5	"Trapped Part A"	Steve Ball	Meghan Fitzmartin	TBA	January 20, 2022	105
After losing so much power, Jessa, Brax, Terra and Maximus feel weak: Jessa falls asleep during class. The Hub is closed off with tight security. Jessa steals her father's talon to reverse the effect of their punishment, which would normally take weeks to recover from. It works without a hitch, and they get their full power back. After their experience in Faery, Jae no longer feels whole. Mischa tries yoga and other techniques to connect to her inner wolf, but nothing works. Surprisingly, it is one of Elda's friends (Zadi) who gives her comfort. Jessa confronts Elda about the body-swapping incident and makes her hand over the talisman she used. Elda lets slip that Terra helped her. Jessa confronts Terra in the cafeteria: they almost fight, but Mischa, Brax and Maximus manage to stop them. Jessa confides in Brax that she and Mischa are Dragon-marked. That night, Jessa uses the talisman to swap with Mischa, so Mischa can experience how it feels to shift. In Jessa's body, Mischa shifts and runs through the woods as a wolf, but then cannot shift back.
6	6	"Trapped Part B"	Steve Ball	Meghan Fitzmartin	TBA	January 20, 2022	106
With a bit of encouragement, Mischa manages to shift back, then she and Jessa swap back. Headmaster Kristov catches the pack on their way back to the campus and confiscates the talisman, but declines to punish them. Mischa feels bad for not being able to shift on her own. Jessa and Terra start to reconcile. Jessa spies on Jonathon and the council as they discuss the situation of the return of the Faerie realm. They fear it means the Dragon-King may return, and discuss establishing a task force to round up the Dragon-marked. It is revealed that Lienda let go her wolf long ago, so as to be able to live in the Human-realm. Mischa steals the Hub pass of one of the teachers. Maximus distracts the guards and Braxton brings down the protection spells. The door to the Faery realm—which the adults have failed to conjure up—shows up for the pack again, and Max has to force Jae away from it. Brax can open the door to the Cloister, but not Mischa or Jessa: it does not react to Dragon-Marked. The Cloister's protection disables the spell hiding the girls' Dragon-marks and the trio find the missing boy, frozen inside a crystal.
7	7	"The Last Dance Part A"	Steve Ball	Julia Yorks	TBA	January 20, 2022	107
The trio is disillusioned that the Cloister is unlike what they have been told their whole lives: children are entrapped in crystal once they get their powers. The twins confront their parents, only to find out that they already know: it is the reason they were split up in the first place. Their Dragon-marks glows bright when the twins are close to each other. Angry at her mother's hypocrisy, Mischa storms out and shifts for the first time. The theme of this year's Equinox Bash is revealed to be "Underwater". Kristov tasks his daughter Elda to keep an eye on Mischa, having noticed her recent strange behavior. Maximus has been watching rom-coms to figure out the best way to ask Mischa out for the dance. At class the students learn how to defend themselves against silver, as it can be deadly for them to be cut with silver weapons. Because she has to keep distance from her sister, Mischa sits out this session, but then touches the silver dagger: it burns her skin, a sign that she has got her powers. Elda spots this instantly and tells her dad. Braxton asks Jessa to the dance, but she says they should all go as a pack. Maximus asks Mischa and she happily accepts. Mischa tells her mother that her powers are awakening. Kristov sets in motion his plot to get rid of Jonathon.
8	8	"The Last Dance Part B"	Steve Ball	Julia Yorks	TBA	January 20, 2022	108
Jessa changes her mind and suggests to Braxton that they go to the dance as a date, only to run off when he mentions her Dragon-mark. The girls rely on their mother's magical make-up to cover their marks. After a mishap, Maximus sees Mischa's mark: he is furious with her and storms off. Headmaster Kristov corners the twins and it is apparent that he has long known of their marks. They escape from his clutches and run back to the dance. There, Kristov reveals to everyone that they are Dragon-marked, and declares that he will take them to the Cloister. One of the teachers, a councilor, defies his authority. The pack rallies behind her to protect the girls. Kristov uses his baton to drain the pack's powers, but then Maximus returns and breaks the baton. The twins try to escape, but are quickly cornered. Kristov conjures the scepter of the Dragon-King and uses it to summon the Cloister prison and release the trapped Dragon-marked: although freed from their crystal prisons, their minds are controlled via the scepter. Kristov declares that he answers only to the Dragon-King. The pack members fight individually, and the councilor conjures a protective wall, but they are soon overwhelmed. Finally, Jessa taps into unknown powers and shifts into a dragon. She is both a Wolf- and a Dragon-Shifter, which astonishes everyone because it was believed impossible. The Dragon-marked yield to her as if she were the Dragon-King. Thwarted, Kristov flees, vowing revenge.
9	9	"Sins of the Father Part A"	Steve Ball	Kerry Glover	TBA	January 20, 2022	109
In the aftermath of headmaster Kristov's betrayal, the school power lines are heavily damaged. Terra's mother (the councilor who tried to protect the students) is in the infirmary, having burned herself out. The twin girls are increasingly bullied. Jonathon promotes Santra, the history teacher, to headmistress. Soon after, he is demoted as council leader and placed under house arrest. Yufon is elected in his place. Yufon accuses Jessa of killing Kristov: Terra suggests she had started the rumor about his death. The girls go to ask questions of the Riddle-Tree in order to figure out Kristov's plan: it was a sapling when the Dragon-King fell and possesses the knowledge of eons. The tree answers their questions in riddles. It appears to refer to the girls as North and South, and they deduce it is referring to an old compass ritual. On their way home, Mischa and Jessa are caught in magic web and pulled away.
10	10	"Sins of the Father Part B"	Steve Ball	Kerry Glover	TBA	January 20, 2022	110
The culprit is revealed to be Terra. She warns the girls not to go home: magical Enforcers known as The Four are hunting them. So long as the magical power grid is broken, they are not able to locate the girls. The school is on lockdown and the barrier has been reinforced, so the girls decide to hide in the bell tower above Kristov's study, where the protection spells are strongest. The pack devises a plan to get the twins to safety by conjuring a door to the human realm. In the study, the girls find old prophecies in the study, which means Kristov had long known that he needs the twins to reawaken the Dragon-King. The Four proclaim to everyone that they want the girls either dead or alive. They interrogate Brax, but are stopped by headmistress Santra. Terra and Jae's preparations go into full swing, but their first try to conjure the door fails and blows out the rest of the power grid. Jae taps into the ley lines underneath the Riddle-Tree, and Terra is able to manifest the door fully this time. With The Four in close pursuit of the twins, Jae jumps in front of a spell to give them time to reach the door and pass into the human realm. They are thrown into the human realm after the twins, just before the door closes. Terra collapses.
11	11	"Supernaturals of New York Part A"	Steve Ball	Jon Cooksey	TBA	January 20, 2022	111
At the Academy, The Four prepare to interrogate Terra, but are stopped by Lienda. As Lienda leads Terra away, Elda watches from hiding. In the human world, the twins and Jae arrive at Lienda and Mischa's old apartment. They instantly feel sick, because of the silver wall paint that hides their presence. Mischa reluctantly agrees for Jae and Jessa to go out to buy some plants, with which Jae can cover the walls to weaken the effect of the paint. They are spotted by Hali, Mischa's friend, who quickly sees that Jessa is not Mischa: they are forced to clue her in and take her back to the apartment. Despite the danger, Hali quickly agrees to help them. By messaging Dante, a troll Mischa befriended at the Academy, the twins are able to speak with Braxton and Maximus. The call is brief, out of fear that The Four will track them. Safe but scared, the twins get some sleep. Restless, Jae goes outside and sings to the autumn trees, sending them into full bloom. Mischa becomes angry, and Jae admits to the addiction they has had since visiting the Faerie realm. Jae says that their Fae magic, now strong throughout the neighborhood, will disguise the twins' Dragon magic. Drawn by the Fae magic, other Faeries living in New York soon approach the group. At the Academy, Braxton and Maximus decide to visit cloisters in other realms. Someone—they assume Kristov—is visiting cloisters one by one to free the Dragon-marked. They plan to deliver him to the authorities so that the hunt for the twins will end. The Four work out that the twins are in New York, but do not know exactly where. They decide to travel there separately, reasoning that one of them will get close enough to detect the twins' presence.
12	12	"Supernaturals of New York Part B"	Steve Ball	Jon Cooksey	TBA	January 20, 2022	112
In the human realm, famous singer Reece, secretly a Faerie, approaches the group. He agrees to convince the Faerie Elders that the twins are no threat, in return for Jae not using their powers openly. Later, Reece contacts them to meet him urgently. In the subway, the teenagers are attacked by one of the Four. Reece helps them escape but is cornered. Back at the apartment, the girls are horrified at the news of Reece's death. With The Four getting ever closer, Jessa decides to go on alone. Mischa and Jae become aware that Jessa is being attacked by the Four, and go to her aid. They reach Central Park, where it is revealed that the Four is in fact just one sorcerer: able to duplicate, but at the cost that his power splits up too. They manage to force him to recombine, whereupon he is ensnared by Jae and the Faerie Elders, in revenge for Reece's murder. At the Academy, Santra takes Elda to see the Dragon-Marked inside the cloister: she is surprised that Elda can use her magic inside. Elda enters her father's office, where a magical toad figurine asks her what she wants. She chooses power, and a black fog surrounds her, changing her appearance. Maximus and Braxton locate Kristov in Berlin and manage to subdue him.
13	13	"Fractured Part A"	Steve Ball	Kaaren Lee Brown	TBA	January 20, 2022	113
Braxton and Maximus hand Kristov over to the enforcers, and Yufon agrees to let Mischa and Jessa return. Kristov is put in a holding cell pending his trial. In New York, Jae stays behind with the New York Faeries as the twins return to the Academy, reuniting with their family and Terra. The twins are still bullied by some of the students. Kristov appears to several students, including the bullies, saying no jail cell can hold him. He offers them power and prestige in return for help in raising the Dragon-King. Jessa and Mischa run their wolves "just for fun". Jessa reveals she hasn't let out her dragon since the school dance, frightened of its power. In New York, Reece is laid to rest. At Jae's suggestion, they and the Faerie Elder take him home to the Faerie-Realm. Once there, they instantly falls victim to their addiction and has to be saved by the Faerie Elder. Back in Central Park, Louis—the sorcerer who made the spell to hide the twins' Dragon-Marks—appears and asks to be brought to Mischa and Jessa. At his trial, Kristov pleads guilty to all charges. He uses his speech—which is broadcast throughout the realm—as a call to action, calling on the students to riot and promising to take back the human realm once the Dragon-King is revived. As the twins leave the courthouse with their friends, a mob of students surround them, demanding they be handed over.
14	14	"Fractured Part B"	Steve Ball	Kaaren Lee Brown	TBA	January 20, 2022	114
A door magically appears and Louis steps out. He threatens to destroy anyone who would harm the twins, and the mob scatters. In fact, he is very weak. Jae comes through the door, also weak. At the twins' house, Louis reveals his plan to kill the Dragon-King: it involves Mischa and Jessa. The twins begin to train, but spot Kristov trying—without success—to persuade three mermaids to join him. The twins try to report this to Yufon, but she believes Kristov is securely locked up. With help from Dante, the twins manage to get some blood from Kristov, which Terra and Jae can test to find out what spell he is using. Elda's power continues to grow. The twins see that she can use magic inside the compound holding the Dragon-Marked and that she is being very generous with her power. Louis reveals his original plan had been to use the East-West twins to kill the Dragon-King, but he could not find them. He had thought of using the North-South twins, Mischa and Jessa, but not until they were older and more experienced. Now Kristov has forced his hand. Louis wanders off. Jessa decides it is time to get to get to know her dragon, and shifts. Brax also shifts and they fly off together. Kristov's blood reveals the use of a false appearance spell cast by Santra: Mischa and friends deduce she has been impersonating Kristov outside the prison. Meanwhile, Louis is attacked by vampires. Jessa and Brax, still in dragon form, come to his rescue but the free Kristov emerges from hiding and attacks Jessa. Heeding a warning from Louis, she avoids a magical trap and fights off an attack by bears. Mischa and Max confront the prisoner Kristov: it turns out it is this Kristov whom Santra is impersonating. Santra reveals herself, overpowers her guards, and takes Max hostage. She threatens to kill Max if Mischa does not come with her.
15	15	"Fateful Part A"	Steve Ball	Gillian Horvath	TBA	January 20, 2022	115
Mischa pretends to yield so Santra lets go of Max, but then uncovers Santra's Dragon-Mark. She is not the real Santra, but her twin, Nimbu: in fact she and Santra are the East-West twins. The twin escapes. Meanwhile, the Kristov trying to capture Jessa is revealed to be the real Santra. Terra—her boosted powers still not under control—and Brax, along with Jae and Terra's mother, ward off Santra and her allies. Jessa also now realizes Santra has a twin. Believing it to be her only option, Mischa kisses Max goodbye and enters a cloister crystal. She allows Max to put her to sleep. The East-West twins arrive and easily overpower Max, locking him in a crystal. They take the crystal containing Mischa and pass through a door. Elda recruits several of the older Dragon-Marked to her cause, and imbues them with power. Jessa feels Mischa's absence when she goes unconscious, and she and Brax go looking for her. They find Max and free him from the crystal. Yufon prepares to send Enforcers after the East-West twins and Kristov. Lienda promises the Enforcers will bring Mischa home, but Jessa worries she will be treated like a criminal. And that the simplest way for them to stop the Dragon-King's resurrection might be to kill Mischa. Jae suggests that Louis recharge from the ley lines. He reveals that the Riddle-Tree was damaged when Jae used the ley lines to conjure the door to New York. In her distress, Jessa enters Mischa's room and accidentally breaks her dragon figurine. Kristov wakes Mischa in the crystal, frightening her to ensure Jessa becomes aware of it. Jessa gets the message and approaches the adults: they prepare a strike team, which is thwarted by a door. Desperate, Jessa decides to use the body-swapping talisman again. She plans to body-swap with Mischa, shift into her dragon and overpower Kristov in the moment of surprise. Terra boosts the talisman's power so it can cross the distance, and Jessa swaps with Mischa. Mischa appears and is horrified.
16	16	"Fateful Part B"	Steve Ball	Gillian Horvath	TBA	January 20, 2022	116
Mischa warns Jessa not to shift because Kristov has enough dragon's bane to kill her in an instant. She is angry since she had deliberately put herself out of the picture, but Jessa brought her back and is now stuck in a crystal. The pack decides to put her dragon figurine back together: Terra reforges the glass, Jae reshapes it, Max strengthens the material, and Brax gives it the heart of a dragon. Mischa, the artist, gives it form. The figurine now has at its core a mending spell that can be used to reshape it if it is ever broken. The barrier around Stratford has been strengthened with Enforcer magic, but Mischa realizes it has a weak spot, because phone signals can still get through. She decides to contact the Elder-Faeries. With most of the Dragon-Marked now on her side, Elda frees them from the compound. She incites them to use their power to break down the boundary to the human realm and to take their 'rightful' place. The adults enlist everyone with combat experience to stop them. In New York, Mischa asks the Faerie Eldest to open a path to the Dragon-King's tomb. Hali tells Mischa about the "King's Bane" comic she read, which contains the same verse the Riddle-Tree gave the twins: "What is shattered must be mended, What is mended must be shattered." Elda and her allies face off against Jonathon, the teachers and students, including the pack. Louis discovers that the source of Elda's power is the dark magic of the Shadow-Spawn, which awoke when the Faerie realm reappeared. The Eldest sends Mischa to the tomb of the Dragon-King. Jessa shifts into her dragon and breaks out of the crystal. Mischa destroys the dragon's bane before Kristov can use it, and the twins swap back. Kristov and the East-West twins (Santra and Nimbu), force the girls into position for the Compass-Ritual and The Dragon-King awakens. Elda and the Dragon-Marked reach the boundary and begin breaking through it. Jonathon infects himself with shadow magic to approach Elda and try to reason with her, but she will not listen. He throws himself in front of a spell, sacrificing himself and causing a huge explosion. In the tomb, Kristov approaches the Dragon-King, claiming that he is his general and that his army of Dragon-Marked is ready. However, the Dragon-King refuses Kristov’s offer, revealing that he prefers to do things on his own and that the rest of the Dragon-Marked were disposable tools since he only wanted the strongest Dragon-Marked, which were Jessa, Mischa, Santra, and Nimbu, as his servants (or as the Dragon-King likes to call his slaves his queens). As the Dragon-King forcefully mind controls Santra and Nimbu against their will, he burns Kristov alive, killing him. Jessa remembers that in the tale of the Dragon War, the Dragon King never had an army, didn’t want one to begin with, and always fought alone, leading her to believe that Kristov, Santra, and Nimbu didn’t pay any attention to the legend at all. She also remembered that due to the Dragon King being stuck in his tomb, he needed both of the Dragon-Marked twins to be extensions of himself so he can destroy all the realms. During this moment, she shifts into her dragon to fight the Dragon-King. Mischa uses the mending core to fashion the figurine into a sword. Saying "What is shattered must be mended," she strikes the Dragon-King, who turns to crystal; he at first struggles to move, but then grabs Mischa and flies off to force her to serve him. Jessa picks up the sword and breaks it, saying "What is mended must be shattered." The Dragon-King dies as he is shattered into pieces, freeing the East-West Twins from their mind control. Jessa catches Mischa as she falls in mid-air around crystal shards, while a traumatized Nimbu flies away in fear, wanting to save herself as Santra is hit by crumbling crystal shards, falling into the magma and dies. In Stratford, the explosion has freed the Dragon-Marked of the Shadow-Spawn's influence, but Elda escapes through a crack in the boundary. The twins arrive home and learn of Jonathon's death. The cloisters are being closed everywhere and the Dragon-Marked reunited with their families. Lienda's wolf returns to her. In the final scene, Brax and Jessa kiss in the bell tower. His eyes glow purple, hinting that he is possessed by shadow magic.

== Production ==
=== Development ===
The series was first announced to be in development in October 2019, with an original release target of fall of 2021. Allen Bohbot serves as the executive producer, while the series is directed by Steve Ball. The pilot was written by Gillian Horvath, who is also headwriter for the other episodes. Jody Prouse serves as the animation director. 41 Entertainment is involved with producing the series, and the animation was provided by ICON Creative Studio.

=== Casting ===
The voice cast includes Larissa Dias, Gigi Saul Guerrero, Cardi Wong, Vincent Tong, Ali J. Eisner and Bethany Brown, as the main characters. Additional characters are spoken by, among others, Alessandro Juliani, Barbara Kottmeier, Brian Drummond, Diana Kaarina, Kathleen Barr and Shannon Chan-Kent.

== Release ==
The series premiered on January 20, 2022 on the streaming service Peacock in the United States, with the series consisting of 16 half-hour episodes. In Japan, the series premiered in 2022 on Disney Channel.

In March 2023, Netflix in the United Kingdom and Australia began carrying the show.

In early July 2026, the first eight episodes were combined and edited into one movie and posted onto 41 Entertainment’s official YouTube channel as Supernatural Academy: Birth of The Dragon Marked. A sequel, consisting of the last eight episodes, was released in late July 2026, titled Supernatural Academy: Fate of The Dragon King.

== Reception ==
=== Critical response ===
Polygon praised the show for its rich concept of having a magical school-setting, that is not just populated by human characters, but a variety of mythological creatures. They take issue with the show not really establishing who their intended audience is, with the animation being more catered to younger children, but the language and themes of the show being more suited for a young adult audience. They note the intriguing nature of the inner politics in the Supernatural and the Human World, even if the pilot doesn't do the best job establishing the vast world the show is trying to build. Slant Magazine also notes as a positive aspect, that the show tries to grapple with social issues relevant for young adults of various backgrounds in today's society, especially the fear and prejudice that comes with being an outcast for superfluous reasons, but criticizes that the show deviates from its rich characters and their problems, to a generic race to save the world during the end of the first season. They give Supernatural Academy a 2 out of 4 stars rating. Common Sense Media gives the show 3 out of 5 stars, criticizing the jerky CGI animation, but praising the good pace of the show and well-rounded characters.
