= Blame (2017 film) =

- Theatrical release poster
- Directed by: Quinn Shephard
- Written by: Quinn Shephard
- Story by: Laurie Shephard; Quinn Shephard
- Produced by: Laurie Shephard; Quinn Shephard
- Starring: Quinn Shephard; Nadia Alexander; Tate Donovan; Chris Messina
- Cinematography: Aaron Kovalchik
- Edited by: Quinn Shephard
- Music by: Pierre-Philippe Côté
- Production company: Reel Enigma
- Distributed by: Samuel Goldwyn Films
- Release dates: April 22, 2017 (Tribeca); January 5, 2018 (United States)
- Running time: 100 minutes
- Country: United States
- Language: English

Blame is a 2017 American teen psychological drama film written, co-produced, edited, and directed by Quinn Shephard, who also stars alongside Nadia Alexander, Tate Donovan, and Chris Messina. The film is Shephard's feature film directorial debut.

The film screened at several film festivals, including at the Tribeca Film Festival, where it was nominated for several awards and won the award for Best Actress in a US Narrative Feature (for Alexander's performance). It received generally positive reviews from critics.

== Plot ==
Timid student Abigail returns to school after spending months in a psych ward. She is taunted for her odd mannerisms, often adopting the traits of characters from the books she reads, prompting her peers to nickname her "Sybil". Tough-and-promiscuous cheerleader Melissa and her friend Sophie take advantage of Abigail's meekness and mock her for being mentally ill. Sophie's friend Ellie is the only one that shows kindness to Abigail.

Substitute drama teacher Jeremy Woods decides to make the class learn The Crucible for their upcoming showcase. Abigail and Melissa begin to rival for both the lead part and for Jeremy's attention, when Jeremy picks Abigail to play Abigail Williams.

Meanwhile, Jeremy's girlfriend Jennifer urges him to take on a new job, feeling he is unfit for teaching. He rebuffs her attempts, stating that he enjoys being a teacher.

Melissa intentionally causes trouble by telling Sophie that her crush, Eric, has volunteered to read as John Proctor with Abigail, making it seem as if Abigail likes him, too. Despite these lies, Melissa makes Eric skip class with her to humiliate Abigail and to have sex with him. Jeremy steps in to read with Abigail and notices her talent for acting. When Melissa and Sophie call Abigail a "slut", Ellie asks them why they are even upset with her. The two girls accuse Ellie of having a crush on Abigail, causing Ellie to walk away.

Melissa continues to attempt to get Jeremy's attention, but he only looks to Abigail, asking her to assist him with the showcase. Ellie, who has been spending her lunch period in the auditorium and away from Sophie and Melissa, listens to Jeremy and Abigail's conversations and writes about them. Abigail confides to Jeremy that she is lonely and ostracized, which is why she appreciates his company.

Melissa becomes intimidated by Abigail's new confidence and locks her in the auditorium after school with the help of Eric and Sophie. Jeremy finds her in there and offers to drive her home. He tells her that she should not care about them and their immaturity.

Jeremy comes home to find Jennifer, who tells him that he missed the meeting she had set up for him for a new job. He brushes it off, but she chastises him and expresses her dissatisfaction with his behavior.

After Melissa's auditorium prank, Jeremy announces that he will be taking on the role of John Proctor and will read with Abigail.

Melissa and Sophie hang out with Eric and their friend TJ to drink and do drugs. Sophie and Eric have sex in the bathroom, but Sophie throws up and ends the night with awkward tension between the two of them. Eric ignores her for days afterward.

In drama class, Jeremy steps out and Melissa taunts Abigail in front of the class, accusing her of being inappropriate with Jeremy. Abigail tells her to shut up and throws Melissa's belongings to the floor, then acts terrified once Jeremy comes back, framing Melissa as the aggressor. The rest of the class watches in shock as Jeremy sends Melissa to the office.

While rehearsing in the auditorium, Abigail and Jeremy share a passionate kiss, interrupted by someone slamming a door shut. Unbeknownst to them, it is Ellie, who is stunned by the event. Later, Sophie confides in Ellie about what happened between her and Eric, tells her she wants to be a better friend, and the two reconcile. While studying, Sophie sees Ellie's diary page describing Abigail and Jeremy's kiss and tells Melissa, who is enraged.

At home, Jeremy has sex with Jennifer while imagining she is Abigail. Feeling guilty, he distances himself from Abigail, making Abigail feel anxious and insecure.

At the school dance, Sophie tells Ellie that she knows about the kiss and that they should tell the school. Ellie states that she knows Sophie and Melissa are feigning concern because of Melissa's jealousy. Infuriated, Melissa again insults Ellie, who leaves.

After the dance, Melissa is caught by her stepfather while taking suggestive photos in her lingerie. She leaves to spend the night at Sophie's.

In the auditorium, in an attempt to make Abigail jealous, Melissa forces herself onto Jeremy. He angrily pushes her away, but Melissa makes sure Abigail sees them walk out of the same room. Melissa later finds Abigail's cross necklace and confronts her by wearing it. Abigail takes the necklace back and storms off.

Thinking Abigail will be absent for the play, Melissa begins to rehearse as her understudy. As the showcase begins, Melissa is ready to go out on stage when Ellie enters backstage with Abigail, who is also dressed in costume. Before Melissa can react, Abigail walks past her and out on stage. Enraged, Melissa heads to the school office to frame Jeremy for sexually assaulting her.

As their performance goes on, Abigail's and Jeremy's real feelings emerge and when the scene ends, Abigail storms off. Jeremy follows, and she accuses him of choosing Melissa over her. He reassures her that nothing happened between him and Melissa. He drives Abigail home, but gently lets her know that their relationship is over.

Back in the school office, with her stepfather present, the authorities arrive to question Melissa about Jeremy. As she goes on, she reveals that she has been hit and sexually abused by him for years. Realizing that she is no longer making up a story about Jeremy, Melissa cries and screams when her stepfather tries to take her away. The police force him to leave.

Some time later, Melissa arrives at school as a much more natural and conscious version of herself than her former tough demeanor. She makes eye contact with Abigail through glass doors, and both girls silently acknowledge each other.

== Cast ==
- Quinn Shephard as Abigail Grey
- Nadia Alexander as Melissa Bowman
- Tate Donovan as Robert McCarthy
- Chris Messina as Jeremy Woods
- Sarah Mezzanotte as Sophie Grant
- Tessa Albertson as Ellie Redgrave
- Luke Slattery as Eric
- Trieste Kelly Dunn as Jennifer
- Marcia Debonis as Ms. Cohen
- Owen Campbell as T.J.
- Elizabeth A. Howell as Abigail's mother
- Carlyle Owens as Abigail's father
- Geneva Carr as Mrs. Howell
- Lily Houghton as Lily
- Phelan Tupik as Phelan
- Larry Mitchell as Officer Dolan

== Production ==
Shephard developed the script for several years. In 2015, after her financier fell through during the first week of shooting, Shephard partially self-financed Blame using money from her college fund and with help from her mother. The film was shot in 19 days in the fall of 2015 in Shepard's hometown of Metuchen, New Jersey.

== Reception ==
=== Critical response ===
On Rotten Tomatoes, the film holds an approval rating of 80% based on 30 reviews, with an average rating of 6.2/10. On Metacritic, the film received a score of 54 out of 100, based on 10 reviews, indicating "mixed or average" reviews.

IndieWire called it a "solid debut", while writing that, though it "isn't fully realized", it establishes Shephard as "someone to watch". Glenn Kenny of The New York Times described the film as "earnest but underdeveloped". Filmmaker magazine called the film "a poignant and incisive examination of modern American adolescence." The Hollywood Reporter called it "a mixed bag of a directorial debut".

=== Accolades ===
At the Tribeca Film Festival, the film was nominated for several awards and won the award for Best Actress in a US Narrative Feature (for Alexander's performance). Blame was also a featured in the Montclair Film Festival 2017 and the Greenwich International Film Festival 2017.
