= Playing Gracie Darling =

2025 Australian television series

- Genre: Supernatural horror, mystery, thriller, drama
- Created by: Miranda Nation
- Written by: Miranda Nation
- Directed by: Jonathan Brough
- Starring: Morgana O'Reilly; Harriet Walter; Rudi Dharmalingam; Celia Pacquola; Annie Maynard; Anne Tenney; Chloe Brink
- Composer: Jan Skubiszewski
- Country of origin: Australia
- Original language: English
- No. of seasons: 1
- No. of episodes: 6

Production
- Executive producers: Jo Porter; Rachel Gardner; Miranda Nation
- Producers: Rachel Gardner; Jo Porter
- Running time: 42–43 minutes
- Production companies: Curio Pictures; Sony Pictures Television

Original release
- Network: Paramount+
- Release: 14 August 2025

Playing Gracie Darling is an Australian supernatural horror drama television series for Paramount+. Produced by Curio Pictures, the series follows the disappearance of Gracie Darling, who hasn't been seen since a séance went wrong 27 years ago. When her friend Joni learns another Darling sibling has disappeared, Joni is haunted as the events of the past catch up to the present. The series premiered on 14 August 2025.

At the 2026 Screen Music Awards, music by Jan Skubiszewski was nominated for Best Music for a Television Drama.

== Plot ==
When Joni was 14, her friend Gracie Darling disappeared after a séance went wrong. She harbors guilt and hasn't been the same since. Joni, now a child psychologist, is still haunted by her past, and when she gets a call from a local cop that another Darling has gone missing after a séance, all the guilt of the past comes to the present.

== Cast ==
- Morgana O'Reilly as Joni Grey, psychologist who returns to her town after Frankie disappears.
  - Eloise Rothfield as young Joni
- Harriet Walter as Pattie Grey, Joni's mother.
- Rudi Dharmalingam as Jay Rajeswaran, police officer and Anita's ex-partner and Raffy's father.
  - Kavan Meegamuge as young Jay
- Kristina Bogic as Gracie Darling, a teenage girl who disappeared 27 years ago after a spirit session.
- Celia Pacquola as Ruth Darling, Gracie's sister and mother of the missing Frankie.
- Annie Maynard as Anita Evans, Jay's ex-partner and Raffy's mother.
  - Scarlett Simmons as young Anita
- Dan Spielman as Peter Darling, orphaned cousin of Gracie and Ruth.
- Anne Tenney as Moira Darling, mother of Gracie and Ruth, and grandmother of Frankie.
- Saiesha Sundaralingam as Raffy Rajeswaran, daughter of Anita and Jay, and best friend of Frankie.
- Chloe Brink as Mina Grey, Joni's teenage daughter.
- Stella Miller as Lulu Grey, Joni's daughter.
- David Quirk as Billy Parkes, a mysterious fisherman.
  - Bede Warnock as young Billy
- Peter Carroll as James Darling, Gracie and Ruth's grandfather.
- Pip Miller as Bob Grey, Joni's father.
- Jazi Hall as Caitlyn Kelly, a rebellious teenager.
- Ariel Donoghue as Frankie Darling, Ruth's daughter, who disappears just like Ruth's sister Gracie.
- Dominic Ona-Ariki as Zac Teporoa, a minister.

== Episodes ==
No.	Title	Directed by	Written by	Original release date
1	"Darling Girl"	Jonathan Brough	Miranda Nation	14 August 2025
2	"Grey Starling"	Jonathan Brough	Miranda Nation	14 August 2025
3	"Murmurations"	Jonathan Brough	Miranda Nation	14 August 2025
4	"Let Me Out"	Jonathan Brough	Miranda Nation	14 August 2025
5	"Nine of Swords"	Jonathan Brough	Miranda Nation	14 August 2025
6	"Dies Irae"	Jonathan Brough	Miranda Nation	14 August 2025

== Production ==
On 16 September 2024, the series was announced at the Paramount+/Network 10 upfronts.

The 6-part series is produced by Curio Pictures with Jo Porter, Rachel Gardner serving as producers, with Anya Beyersdorf writing additional content. All six episodes were directed by Jonathan Brough.

On 15 January 2025, the series had entered production receiving funding from Screen Australia and Screen NSW, with filming taking place in New South Wales' Hawkesbury River region.
