= Satanic Hispanics =

- Official release poster
- Directed by: Mike Mendez; Demián Rugna; Eduardo Sánchez; Gigi Saul Guerrero; Alejandro Brugués
- Written by: Alejandro Méndez; Demián Rugna; Lino K. Villa; Pete Barnstrom
- Produced by: Various
- Starring: Efren Ramirez; Greg Grunberg; Jacob Vargas; Hemky Madera; Patricia Velásquez; Jonah Ray
- Cinematography: Luke Bramley; Matthias Schubert
- Edited by: Mike Mendez
- Music by: Various
- Production companies: Epic Pictures Group; Reserva Films
- Distributed by: Iconic Events Releasing
- Release date: 2022 (Fantastic Fest)
- Running time: 105 minutes
- Countries: United States; Mexico
- Language: English

Satanic Hispanics is a 2022 horror anthology film written by Alejandro Méndez, Demián Rugna, Lino K. Villa and Pete Barnstrom, directed by Mike Mendez, Demián Rugna, Eduardo Sánchez, Gigi Saul Guerrero and Alejandro Brugués and starring Efren Ramirez, Greg Grunberg, Jacob Vargas, Hemky Madera, Patricia Velásquez and Jonah Ray. The film is an international co-production between the United States and Mexico.

== Plot ==
=== Chapter 1: The Traveler ===
A SWAT team bust into a facility to find numerous dead bodies, all of whom seemingly did so from a gunshot to the head. They find one survivor, a man simply called The Traveler, who attempts to sever his hand, only to be caught and brought in for questioning. The Traveler is interrogated by Detectives Arden and Gibbons who demand to know if he is aware of the incident that occurred. The Traveler explains that he is constantly on the move, that he barely knew the people who all died, and that if he doesn't leave in the next 90 minutes people will die. He does end up identifying one of the bodies as belonging to a man named Gustavo, though he does not know if he knew him before or after his death and proceeds to tell his story.

=== Chapter 2: Tambien Lo Vi ===
Gustavo is a mental prodigy who lives in his grandmother's old house. He attempts to show a pizza delivery man an unusual thing that involves him making movements with his phone light, though the man doesn't see anything. Gustavo's sister Jessy wants him to put his bright mind to use by entering a gameshow in Japan to earn money, though he is reluctant to do so due to his fear of making a mistake. Gustavo invites a paranormal investigator to his house named Vicente and shows him the light trick. Vicente sees something that causes him to panic and leave the house.

Later, Gustavo is frightened by the appearance of a mutilated body on the floor and breaks his fingers in the process. He takes pictures of it and sends them to Jessy. Just then, Vicente returns and reveals that he saw the spirit of his mother who was in the hospital. When he left in a panic earlier, he discovered that his mother had died. The movements that Gustavo performs are actually a "key" to opening the door to the afterlife. Upon showing him the mutilated body, Vicente is convinced that it is his mother and hugs it. Gustavo panics and performs another ritual sending the body, as well as Vicente, away. Jessy calls Gustavo who believes that the photos that he sent her were of him (Gustavo believed that it was his father). More mutilated Gustavos appear in the house. One of them pulls out a phone and it flashes back to when Gustavo showed the delivery man the light trick, implying that Gustavo was seeing the future.

Arden and Gibbons are shown photos of the Traveler, revealing that he has been around for decades. They demand an explanation with the Traveler claiming that he is immortal, having been around since the Aztecs. He proves this by showing that his hand has miraculously healed. When the detectives still don't believe him, the Traveler decides to reveal the explanation behind the recent victims with blood loss: a vampire.

=== Chapter 3: El Vampiro ===
On Halloween night, a vampire, simply named El Vampiro, finishes draining his victims in a bar when he gets a call from his love Maribel who tells him that due to daylight savings, he only has fifteen minutes to get back home before the sun comes back up. The two get into an argument and Maribel hangs up on him. Unable to transform into a bat due to having not done so in a long time, El Vampiro steals a scooter, but gets knocked down by three clowns. He chases them and kills them, only to be caught by the cops. They initially think its fake, but realize it is real, forcing El Vampiro to flee. After accidentally running into a church, El Vampiro escapes and calls Maribel to apologize for insulting her. She arrives in a car and the two drive away, but get caught in a traffic jam, forcing the two to flee on foot. They hide in a garbage bin, but the sun still leaks through. The two declare their love before succumbing to the sunlight. A man comes to throw his trash away and sees two skeletons locked in an embrace, believing them to be leftover Halloween decorations.

Arden and Gibbons become annoyed with the Traveler and pull out his belongings, among them a ring which they falsely assumed he stole. They also find a vial of what appears to be blood, though the Traveler claims that even he isn't sure what it is, other than that it was part of a ritual that he picked up shortly afterwards.

=== Chapter 4: Nahuales ===
Ramón De la Cruz, an implied political opponent, escapes to his safehouse when he gets a call from US Agents asking for him to confirm knowledge of Jose Luis Salvador, a political dictator and an enemy of the US. Through identifying himself, it is revealed that De la Cruz had a wife and children who died from "gunshot[s]". He insists that after his election, he be offered safe passage to remain in the US, though he is not promised this. He is soon attacked by Nahuales (animal shapeshifters) who capture and drag him into the woods where he is beaten and tortured. He is put in front of Madre Tierra (Mother Earth) who implies that he came to them for power, but abused it for his own use. He has his throat slashed and his blood is drunk. Madre Tierra and her Nahuales go back to the safehouse and break down one of the walls, revealing wrapped up bodies (implied to be De la Cruz's family). Madre Tierra and the Nahuales weep over the loss of innocent lives.

Gibbons asks about an unusual bullet in the Traveler's possession and he explains that it is filled with the sawdust from the holy cross and is coated in the iron made from the nails. While immortal, there is one thing that can still kill him: San La Muerte. The ring was the Traveler's engagement ring. When his wife and son were chosen for sacrifice, he asked San La Muerte for him by giving up his life. When his time came, he got scared and began to run from him. It is revealed that the police have the gun needed to fire the bullet to defeat San La Muerte, but when the Traveler demands it, they refuse to give it to him. He compares it to the events that afflicted Malcolm and tells his story next.

=== Chapter 5: The Hammer of Zanzibar ===
The title for this segment is not revealed until later. Malcolm reunites with mutual friend Amy at a restaurant they use to frequent all the time. Years ago, they and a group of friends went to Cuba to shoot a documentary for Amy. They witnessed a ritual that they were not supposed to see, which Malcolm ended up recording. Because of this, their friends have died one by one by various Cuban deities who possess one another. Malcolm had tried to get rid of the tape, but it keeps coming back. Knowing that evil spirits want it, his only hope is to defeat them somehow. Amy tells Malcolm to calm down, but he begins to suspect that she is the final deity, the Zombie King. He points out that the restaurant they are in, actually closed down. Amy reveals that she is indeed the Zombie King and she and Malcolm fight with the latter using guns. These prove ineffective until he pulls out the one weapon that can harm her, revealing the title of the segment: The Hammer of Zanzibar.

One week prior, Malcolm and Miguel enter an antique store and meet with El Jefe and ask for a weapon to defeat Cuban deities. El Jefe tells a homoerotic story about how he came to acquire the Hammer of Zanzibar which is revealed to resemble a giant wooden dildo. As Malcolm and Miguel nearly leave in disgust, Miguel is possessed by one of the deities, forcing El Jefe to kill him with the Hammer. In the present, Malcolm uses the Hammer to efficiently beat and kill the Zombie King who declares that she will be back. As the illusion wears off, Malcolm discovers all the patrons in the restaurant have been killed, presumably by him. He is tackled by a police officer.

The Traveler reveals that Malcolm was let off as he was a white man in a Latino restaurant; the police assumed he was defending himself against a "gang". Arden and Gibbons refuse to listen to anymore stories and plan to put him back in his cell when the lights begin to flicker. The Traveler explains that San La Muerte has arrived.

=== Chapter 6: San La Muerte ===
San La Muerte enters the police station where he uses his powers to kill the police and the prisoners inside. Desperate to get rid of him, Gibbons hands the Traveler the gun needed to fire his bullet. The Traveler faces San La Muerte and fires it into him, causing him to disintegrate. The Traveler flees, narrating that he will return, and steals a car to leave town. As he is driving away, a cop pulls him over and asks why he is driving in such a hurry, to the which the Traveler explains that if he doesn't leave within 90 minutes, people will die.

== Cast ==
=== The Traveler and San La Muerte ===
- Efren Ramirez as The Traveler
- Greg Grunberg as Detective Arden
- Sonya Eddy as Detective Gibbons
- Lombardo Boyar as Officer Hernandez
- Mark Steger as The Odd Man
- Alejandro Brugués as Dead Cuban

=== Tambien Lo Vi ===
- Demián Salomón as Gustavo
- Luis Machín as Vicente
- Victoria Maurette as Jessy
- Carlos Segane as Delivery

=== El Vampiro ===
- Hemky Madera as El Vampiro
- Patricia Velásquez as Maribel
- Ken Arnold as Cop #1
- Darien Rothchild as Cop #2
- Michael C. Williams as Dog Walker

=== Nahuales ===
- Ari Gallegos as De la Cruz
- Gabriela Ruíz as Madre Tierra
- Jesus Meza as Nahual Oso
- Pedro Joaquín as Nahual Perro
- Marcio Moreno as Nahual Lobo
- Carlos L. Vazquez as Nahual Búho

=== The Hammer of Zanzibar ===
- Jonah Ray Rodrigeuez as Malcolm
- Danielle Chaves as Amy
- Christian Rodrigo as Miguel
- Jacob Vargas as El Jefe
- Morgana Ignis as King Zombie
- Mike Mendez as Gus
- Daniela Medeiros as Carol

== Release ==
The film premiered at the Fantastic Fest in 2022. Then it was released in theaters on September 14, 2023.

== Reception ==
The film has a 89% rating on Rotten Tomatoes based on 38 reviews. The website's consensus reads: "A smooth blend of scares and dark humor, Satanic Hispanics is a well-crafted horror anthology whose occasionally jarring tonal shifts are easy to forgive." Brittany Witherspoon of Film Threat rated the film a 5 out 10. Matt Donato of /Film rated the film a 7.5 out of 10. Meagan Navarro of Bloody Disgusting awarded the film three and a half "skulls" out of five. Simon Abrams of RogerEbert.com awarded the film two stars. Olly Dyche of MovieWeb awarded the film four stars out of five.

Reyna Cervantes of IGN gave the film a mixed review and wrote, "Unfortunately it’s also held back by some uneven storytelling and humor that doesn’t always land. There’s a lot of fun and scares to be had, but ultimately, like most horror anthologies, your mileage may vary."

Erik Piepenburg of The New York Times gave the film a negative review and wrote, "This anthology of films from five Latino filmmakers sadly doesn’t live up to the promise of devilish short-form horror that its title foreshadows."

J Hurtado of Screen Anarchy gave the film a positive review and wrote, "What do you get when you bring five of the most talented Hispanic genre filmmakers in the indie space together on a horrorific anthology project? A whole lot of bloody fun, and that’s exactly what Satanic Hispanics delivers."

Josh Bell of Comic Book Resources also gave the film a positive review and wrote, "As a showcase for a group of underappreciated Latino horror filmmakers, Satanic Hispanics accomplishes its goal."

Matthew Jackson of Paste also gave the film a positive review, calling it "an absolute blast of gore, laughter and surprising emotional heft."
