= México Bárbaro =

Horror Film, 2014

México Bárbaro (a.k.a. Barbarous Mexico) is a 2014 Mexican anthology horror film composed of eight shorts, each by a different Mexican horror film director. Five of the directors - Lex Ortega, Isaac Ezban, Aaron Soto, Ulisses Guzman and Jorge Michel Grau - were established members of the Mexican film industry, while the other three - Laurette Flores, Edgar Nito and Gigi Saul Guerrero - were relative newcomers.

It premiered at the Sitges International Fantastic Film Festival on October 8, 2014. In 2015, it was released on DVD and VOD in the U.S. and in 2016 on Netflix around the world. The film was sold to six countries during the Le Marché du Film at Festival de Cannes 2015, including MPI/Dark Sky Films. The film is part of the new Cine de Terror Mexicano movement.

== Plot ==
The film is divided into eight chapters by eight different directors, each relating to a different Mexican legend or myth. The directors were then given free rein in choosing a subgenre to create a story involving the legend. The varieties of the myths and legends range from real "nota roja" ("red note", news genre focused on crime) to fantasy folk tales.

=== Chapters ===
1. Tzompantli by Laurette Flores - Story about the rituals of drug dealers that mirrors practices originated with the Aztecs.
2. Jaral de Berrios by Edgar Nito - Two criminals take refuge in the ruins of Hacienda del Jaral de Berrios in San Felipe. The legends of its curse come true.
3. Drena ("Drain") by Aaron Soto - A young teenage girl smokes a spliff found on a dead body and has a vision she must drain blood from her sister's vagina.
4. La cosa más preciada ("That Precious Thing") by Isaac Ezban - A young couple plans a romantic night in the woods only to be interrupted by the local trolls.
5. Lo que importa es lo de adentro ("What's Important is Inside") by Lex Ortega. - Laura, a girl with special needs is terrified by her apartment building's custodian. She calls him the boogeyman, one of the few words she can articulate. Her family ignores her distress even when the boogeyman hits close to home.
6. Muñecas ("Dolls") by Jorge Michel Grau - A woman escapes her butcher captor, only to be recaptured in the most unlikely of places.
7. Siete veces siete ("Seven times Seven") by Ulises Gùzman - A man appears to be trying to dispose of a body but then performs a ritual to bring him back to life first, so the deceased can atone.
8. Día de los Muertos ("Day of the Dead") by GiGi Saul Guerrero - Strippers take revenge on the most aptly named Mexican holiday.

== Reception ==
Rotten Tomatoes reports that 60% of critics gave the film a positive review.
