= Ali J. Eisner =

Canadian puppeteer

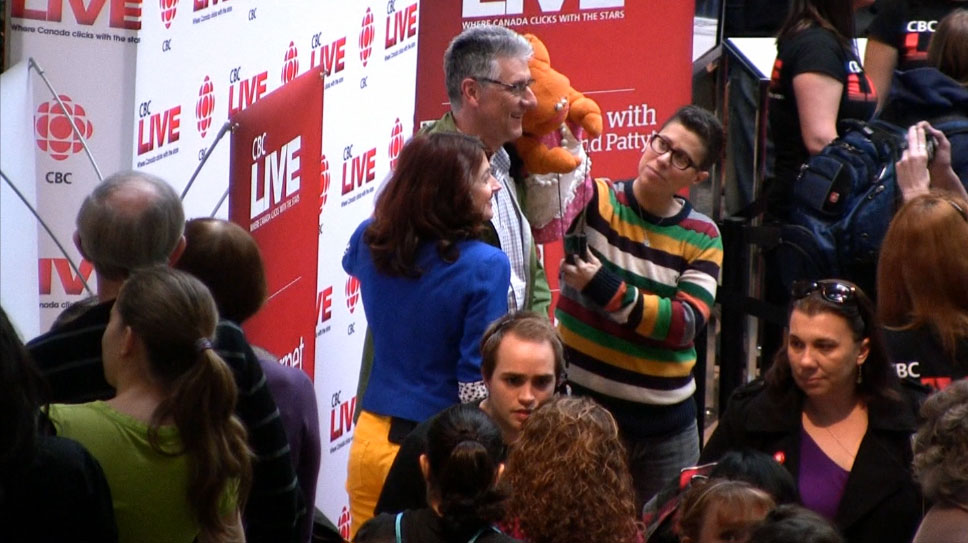
Eisner (in striped shirt) puppeteering Mamma Yamma at a CBC promotional event

Ali J. Eisner is a Canadian puppeteer, composer, director, story editor, creative producer and screenwriter for children's television.

Eisner has created children's content and performed on programs for The Jim Henson Company, CBC Television, TVOntario, NBC Universal, YTV, PBS, FOX Entertainment, Paramount, Peacock, Apple TV, Nick Jr and the Disney Channel. They were the creator of Mamma Yamma for CBC Television, and were a director and supervising producer for The Sunny Side Up Show on PBS Kids Sprout. Eisner played "Jay" the Blue Jay on "TVO Kids" for 16 years. Their main wheelhouse when puppeteering is to collaborate with Canadian musicians. They have also written, composed music and directed for children's television for the last 25 years. In their spare time they are also a photographer.

Most recent works include puppeteering on Fraggle Rock: Back to the Rock an episode of Star Trek (Season 4 ep.5) and cast as a main character (Jae) on Supernatural Academy, airing on Peacock.

At the Juno Awards of 2019, Eisner's video for "No Depression" that they directed and puppeteered for the band Bahamas won the Juno Award for Video of the Year.

Ali is transgender and non-binary and uses they/them pronouns.
