= Howl (2025 film) =

2025 Australian short film

- Festival release poster
- Directed by: Domini Marshall
- Written by: Domini Marshall
- Produced by: Josie Baynes
- Starring: Ingrid Torelli; Kristina Bogic; Safe Shahab; Liam Mollica
- Cinematography: Matthew Chuang
- Edited by: Geri Docherty
- Music by: Patrick Grigg
- Production company: Wildebeest Films
- Release date: 18 February 2025 (Berlinale)
- Running time: 15 minutes
- Country: Australia
- Language: English

Howl is a 2025 Australian short drama film written and directed by Domini Marshall. The film follows Daisy and Lila, who are best friends. At a suburban house party, shifting desires and tough choices force them to reconsider their place in the world and what they mean to each other.

The film was selected in the Generation 14plus section at the 75th Berlin International Film Festival, where it had its world premiere on 18 February 2025. It is also selected for 39th Teddy Award, and will compete for Best Short Film.

== Synopsis ==
The film is a quiet, honest story about friendship, identity, and the moments that define relationships. Best friends Daisy and Lila are inseparable until tensions arise. Daisy has started her period while Lila feels left behind. At a party, Lila abandons Daisy for a boy, leaving Daisy to meet the confident Drew, who offers an enticing escape. When Drew kisses her, Daisy ignores Lila’s call for help. Later, she questions her choice.

== Cast ==
- Ingrid Torelli as Daisy
- Kristina Bogic as Lila
- Safe Shahab as Drew
- Liam Mollica as Matt

== Release ==
Howl had its world premiere on 18 February 2025, as part of the 75th Berlin International Film Festival, in Generation 14plus.

== Accolades ==
Award	Date	Category	Recipient	Result	Ref.
Berlin International Film Festival	23 February 2025	Grand Prize for Best Film	Howl	Nominated	
Berlin International Film Festival	23 February 2025	Teddy Award for Best Short Films	Howl	Nominated	
