= Cold Hell =

2017 film by Stefan Ruzowitzky

- Theatrical release poster
- German: Die Hölle – Inferno
- Directed by: Stefan Ruzowitzky
- Written by: Martin Ambrosch
- Produced by: Helmut Grasser; Thomas Peter Friedl
- Starring: Violetta Schurawlow; Tobias Moretti; Sammy Sheik; Robert Palfrader; Friedrich von Thun; Verena Altenberger; Stefan Pohl; Murathan Muslu; Nursel Köse
- Cinematography: Benedict Neuenfels
- Edited by: Britta Nahler
- Music by: Marius Ruhland
- Production companies: Allegro Film; The Amazing Film Company
- Distributed by: Luna Filmverleih (Austria); Splendid Film (Germany)
- Release date: 19 January 2017
- Running time: 92 minutes
- Countries: Austria; Germany
- Language: German

Cold Hell (German: Die Hölle – Inferno, lit. 'Hell') is a 2017 crime thriller film directed by Stefan Ruzowitzky and starring Violetta Schurawlow, Tobias Moretti, Sammy Sheik and Robert Palfrader. A co-production between Austria and Germany, the film was released theatrically on 19 January 2017 in Austria by Luna Filmverleih and in Germany by Splendid Film.

== Cast ==
- Violetta Schurawlow as Özge Dogruol
- Tobias Moretti as Christian Steiner
- Robert Palfrader as Samir
- Sammy Sheik as Saeed el Hadary
- Friedrich von Thun as Karl Steiner
- Stefan Pohl as Petrovic
- Murathan Muslu as Ilhan
- Nursel Köse as Hande
- Verena Altenberger as Ranya
- Steffen Anton as Soeren Eckdal
- Stephani Burkhard as Nazan
- Deniz Cooper as Adem
- Hans-Maria Darnov as Teacher
- Erika Deutinger as Frau Öfferl

== Reception ==
On the review aggregator website Rotten Tomatoes, 91% of 11 critics' reviews are positive, with an average rating of 7.4/10.
