= Nadia Alexander =

American actress

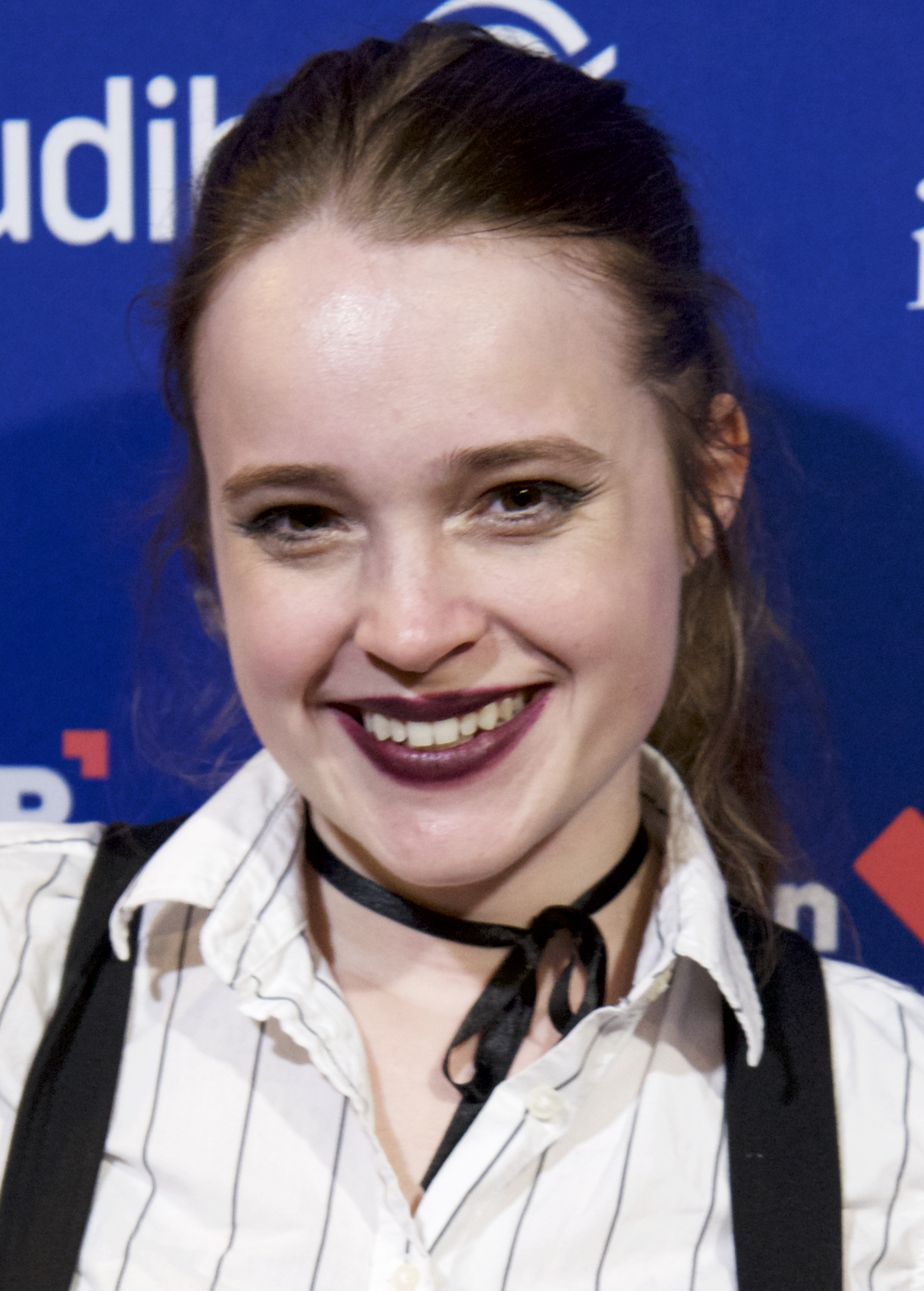
- Alexander in 2017
- Born: April 5, 1994 (age 32); Columbia, South Carolina, United States
- Occupation: Actress
- Years active: 2005–present
- Partner: Quinn Shephard (2015–2023)

Nadia Alexander (born April 5, 1994) is an American actress. She has performed in several television series, including The Sinner (2017) and Seven Seconds (2018). She won the award for Best Actress in a U.S. Narrative Film at the 2017 Tribeca Film Festival for her performance in Blame (2017) and was nominated for a Fangoria Chainsaw Award for Best Actress for her performance in The Dark (2019).

== Career ==
Alexander began acting at the age of six, when she was cast in a Pittsburgh-area regional stage production of The Sound of Music as Gretl. She worked professionally throughout her childhood at most of southwestern Pennsylvania's Equity theaters, including Pittsburgh Public Theater, where she won first place in their annual Shakespeare Monologue Competition for three consecutive years.

In 2007, Alexander moved to New York City, and began doing commercial and episodic television work. While still in high school, Alexander performed off-Broadway in There Are No More Big Secrets at Rattlestick Playwrights Theater. Her first feature film performance was in the independent movie Postales. She went on to appear in Ten Thousand Saints and Fan Girl.

In 2010, she made a guest appearance on an episode of Law & Order. Since then, she has worked on several television series, including Boardwalk Empire (2011), The Following (2015), The Sinner (2017), and Seven Seconds (2018).

In 2017, she played a lead role in Blame (2017). The film screened at several film festivals, and for her work Alexander won the award for Best Actress in a U.S. Narrative Film at the 2017 Tribeca Film Festival.

== Personal life ==
Alexander identifies as pansexual. She was formerly in a relationship with Blame co-star and director Quinn Shephard.

== Filmography ==
=== Film ===
Year	Title	Role	Notes and awards
2010	Postales	Mary	
2013	Admission	Quest Student	
2014	Jamie Marks Is Dead	Wendy	Shown at 2014 Sundance Film Festival
2015	Ten Thousand Saints	Prudence Keffy-Horn	Shown at 2015 Sundance Film Festival
2015	Fan Girl	Kim	
2017	Blame	Melissa Bowman	Tribeca Film Festival Best Actress in a U.S. Narrative Feature Film
2018	The Dark	Mina	Debuted at the 2018 Tribeca Film Festival
2018	Boarding School	Phil	
2022	Tankhouse	Leah	
2022	Not Okay	Harper	

=== Television ===
Year	Title	Role	Notes and awards
2009	Possible Side Effects	Alma	Showtime pilot, aired November 2009
2010	Law & Order	Morgan	Season 20, episode 23: "Rubber Room"
2010	Delocated	Tatiana	Season 2, episode 11: "David's Girlfriend"
2011	Boardwalk Empire	Bethany Rohan	Season 2, episode 7: "Peg of Old"
2012	The Mob Doctor	Susie Demarco	Season 1, episode 1
2015	The Following	Emily Hays	Season 3, episode 4
2015	The Devil You Know	Ann Putnam Jr.	Lead role
2015	The Wilding	Kayla Hayes	Lead role
2017	Elementary	Hope Neligan	Season 5, episode 18: "Dead Man's Tale"
2017	The Sinner	Phoebe	Recurring role in season 1
2018	Bull	Olivia Lexington	Season 2, episode 13: "Kill Shot"
2018	Seven Seconds	Nadine MacAllister	Recurring role
2020	Monsterland	FinalGirl	Episode 2: "Eugene, OR"
2021	Younger	Füpa Grünhoff	Season 7, Episode 2: "It's the End of the World, Worm Girl"
2022	Servant	Sylvia	Season 3, episode 4: "Ring"
2026	Watson	Hollis Pitter	Season 2, episode 15: "A Third Act Surprise"

=== Web ===
Year	Title	Role	Notes
2020	Day by Day	Sam (voice)	2 episodes
