= We Kill for Love =

We Kill for Love is a 2023 documentary film which depicts the history of the direct to video erotic thriller film.

On Rotten Tomatoes, the film has an approval rating of 88% based on reviews from 16 critics.
