= The Dark (2018 film) =

2018 Austrian horror film

- Film poster
- Directed by: Justin P. Lange
- Written by: Justin P. Lange
- Produced by: Danny Krausz; Kurt Stocker; Florian Krügel
- Starring: Nadia Alexander; Toby Nichols; Karl Markovics
- Cinematography: Klemens Hufnagl
- Edited by: Julia Drack
- Music by: Iva Zabkar
- Production company: Dark Sky Films
- Release date: 31 August 2018 (United States)
- Running time: 95 minutes
- Country: Austria
- Language: English

The Dark is a 2018 Austrian horror film written and directed by Justin P. Lange and starring Nadia Alexander, Toby Nichols, and Karl Markovics. The plot features an undead teenage girl befriending an abused, blind boy and regaining humanity in the process.

The film had its world premiere at the 2018 Tribeca Film Festival on April 21, 2018. It was released in the United States on VOD on October 26, 2018.

== Cast ==
- Nadia Alexander as Mina
- Toby Nichols as Alex
- Karl Markovics as Josef

== Reception ==
On the review aggregator website Rotten Tomatoes, 89% of 27 critics' reviews are positive. On Metacritic, the film has a weighted average score of 52 out of 100 based on 4 critics, which the site labels as "mixed or average" reviews.

Variety described The Dark as "well-crafted and well-acted", but that "in trying to succeed as something both metaphorical and very literal-minded, the movie ends up being neither one nor the other — not psychologically deep enough to succeed as pure drama, and too earnest to offer the usual rewards of a genre film."
