= Violetta Schurawlow =

German actress (born 1986)

Violetta Schurawlow, 2014.
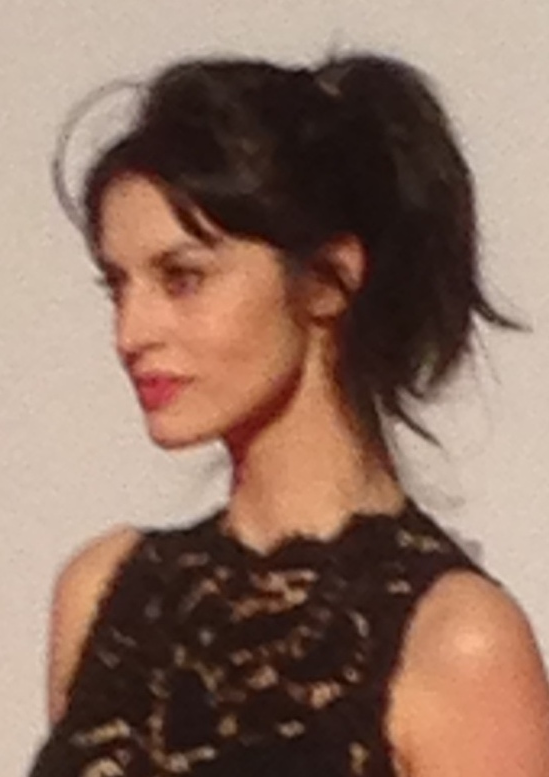
- Born: 1 March 1986 (age 40); Angren, Uzbekistan, Soviet Union
- Occupation: Actress
- Years active: 2012-present

Violetta Schurawlow (born 1 March 1986) is a German actress. She appeared in more than ten films since 2012.

== Selected filmography ==
Year	Title	Role	Notes
2014	Everything Is Love	Bianca	
2014	Head Full of Honey	Nonne	
2015	Half Brothers	Jenny	
2017	Iceman	Mitar	
2017	Familiye	Sila Morgenstern	
2017	Cold Hell	Özge Dogruol	
