= Viscera Film Festival =

The Viscera Film Festival was an annual Los Angeles-based horror film festival for women filmmakers. Originally an online festival, Viscera was founded in 2007 by Shannon Lark and Heidi Honeycutt. In July 2010, the festival became a live event with screenings held at the Egyptian Theatre in Hollywood. All of the screenings were short films. After the Egyptian Theatre premiere, Viscera toured their yearly film lineup at events held around the world for the rest of the year. The Scream Queen Filmfest Tokyo was a subsidiary festival.

== 2007 Selections ==
The 2007 Viscera Film Festival Selections included "Go Ask Alice" by Shannon Lark, "I'm a Little Teapot" by Sallie Smith, "The Cleaner" by Michelle Fatale, "Wretched" by Heidi Martinuzzi and Leslie Delano, "When Sally Met Frank" by Victoria Waghorn, "Snake Pit" by Brandy Rainey, and "Out of Print" by Reyna Young (Viscera Award Winner).

== 2010 Selections ==
The 2010 Viscera Film Festival Selections included "The Date" (Viscera Award Winner) by Natasia Schibinger and Jennifer Gigantino, "Don't Lose Heart" by Taliesyn Brown and Matt Mitchell, "Hollow Halls" by Ebony Winston, "Sisters" by Belinda Green-Smith, "Fantasy" by Izabel Grondin, "Lip Stick" by Shannon Lark and Stacie Ponder, "Deadly Beauty" by Chandeline Nicole, "Confederate Zombie Massacre" by Devi Snively, "Taste of Flesh, Taste of Fear" by Stacie Ponder, and "Snow Day, Bloody Snow Day" by Faye Hoerauf and Jessica Baxter.

== Inspiration Award ==
The Inspiration Award was founded in 2012 to honor women filmmakers.

- 2012: Mary Lambert
- 2013: Jennifer Lynch
