= Terrified (film) =

2018 Argentine hyperlink supernatural horror film

- Official release poster
- Spanish: Aterrados
- Directed by: Demián Rugna
- Written by: Demián Rugna
- Produced by: Fernando Diaz
- Starring: Maxi Ghione; Norberto Gonzalo; Elvira Onetto; George L. Lewis
- Cinematography: Mariano Suárez
- Edited by: Lionel Cornistein
- Music by: Demián Rugna
- Distributed by: Aura Films
- Release dates: October 2017 (Mórbido Fest); May 3, 2018 (Argentina)
- Running time: 87 minutes
- Country: Argentina
- Language: Spanish

Terrified (Spanish: Aterrados) is a 2017 Argentine hyperlink supernatural horror film written and directed by Demián Rugna, concerning a series of supernatural events in a neighbourhood of Buenos Aires.

== Plot ==
In Buenos Aires, Clara hears strange voices coming from the plughole in her kitchen sink. The voices seem to be discussing a plan to kill her. Her husband, Juan, dismisses the sounds and blames their noisy neighbor Walter. That night, awakened by thumping sounds, Juan finds Clara's dead body hovering in midair in their bathroom, repeatedly slamming against the wall as if thrown by an invisible force.

The narrative jumps to some time earlier, when Walter is also experiencing supernatural occurrences. Each night, invisible forces shake and move his furniture, including his bed. When he uses a video camera to film the events, he sees a tall, naked figure emerging from beneath the bed, standing over him as he sleeps, and hiding in the wardrobe. When he seeks out the figure it grabs him from behind.

Alicia's young son tries to drink from a tap outside Walter's shut-up house. Walter scares the boy away without emerging from his house, warning him of the tap water, but as the boy backs away, a bus strikes and kills him. Clara and Juan attend the funeral. Some time later, Alicia's deceased son is sitting at the kitchen table having apparently returned from the cemetery. Alicia's ex-boyfriend, police commissioner Funes, calls in Jano, a paranormal investigator and former coroner. Jano suggests that they should be as discreet as possible and re-bury the corpse. Funes leaves to organize the process.

Jano happens to meet Dr. Mora Albreck, another paranormal investigator, nearby. Mora has arrived to meet Walter after viewing the video recordings he sent her. However, he has since gone missing. Jano explains the situation with Alicia's son to her. While they speak, they hear a neighbor's child scream for his mother and realize he had intruded on the house and seen the corpse. They move the body to an outside freezer. Unbeknownst to them, the neighbor's child is watching and records them. Jano, Dr. Albreck, and another paranormal researcher, Rosentock, visit Juan, now the main suspect in his wife's murder in a psychiatric facility. After being assured they believe his story, Juan allows them to investigate his house.

The specialists return to the troubled street and separate to investigate Walter's and Juan's houses. Funes accompanies Rosentock, who is based at Walter's house. Dr. Albreck and Rosentock theorize that the neighborhood serves as a gateway to another dimension of existence, allowing dark entities to emerge from it and travel through tap water, haunting the houses along the street. Rosentock becomes obsessed with his investigation and remains in Walter's house. In his attempts to escape, Funes witnesses Jano supernaturally trapped in a chest of drawers and Dr. Albreck being dragged into the other dimension by a being that appears to be Walter. He experiences a heart attack. Alicia returns to confront Funes about his choices in dealing with the situation before committing suicide. Funes finally retrieves gasoline and uses it to burn down Alicia's house.

Back at the psychiatric facility, the police attempt to further question Juan, but he is distracted by the figure of a tall man behind them who resembles a burned Rosentock. They turn around and see an empty chair move on its own. Suddenly, the chair flies towards the camera.

== Cast ==
- Maximiliano Ghione as Commissioner Funes
- Norberto Gonzalo as Jano
- Elvira Onetto as Dr. Mora Albreck
- George L. Lewis as Rosentock
- Julieta Vallina as Alicia
- Demián Salomón as Walter
- Agustín Rittano as Juan
- Natalia Señorales as Clara
- Matias Rascovschi as the boy
- Lorenzo Langer as Patricio

== Release ==
Terrified was first screened at the Mórbido Fest 2017 in Mexico, followed by an international premiere at the 33rd Mar del Plata International Film Festival. The film received a general release in Argentina on 3 May 2018, opening on a smaller-than-average number of screens (80) but coming seventh at the box office on its opening weekend.

In the United States, Canada and the UK, Terrified was made available for home viewing via the streaming service Shudder.

=== Reception ===
On the review aggregator website Rotten Tomatoes Terrified holds an "83% fresh" rating, based on 12 reviews, representing a positive response from critics. Vulture placed it among its "Best Horror Movies of 2018 (So Far)", writing: "Terrified won best horror feature at this year’s Fantastic Fest, and is an absolutely excellent tale of the supernatural featuring some amazing deaths and creature effects. Fans of Insidious and The Conjuring should be big fans of this one, too." Kim Newman called it "[e]ffectively spooky stuff" after viewing it at the London FrightFest Film Festival in 2018.

== Future ==
In December 2018, it was reported that Guillermo del Toro would produce a remake of the film for Fox Searchlight Pictures, with Rugna returning to direct and Sacha Gervasi writing. In April 2026, the remake moved to Warner Bros. Pictures with Noah Hawley now directing.

During the COVID-19 pandemic lockdowns, writer-director Demián Rugna revealed he was working on the second draft of a script for a sequel, Terrified 2.
