= Gigi Saul Guerrero =

Mexican filmmaker (born 1990)

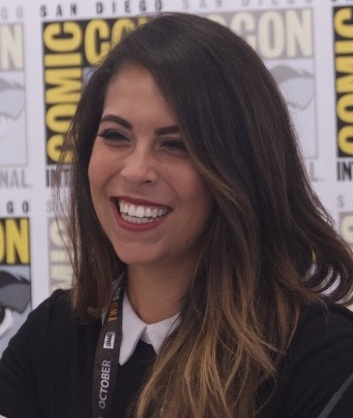
- Guerrero at San Diego Comic-Con 2019
- Born: February 27, 1990 (age 36); Mexico City, Mexico
- Education: Earl Marriott Secondary School; Capilano University
- Occupations: Filmmaker; actress
- Years active: 2011–present

Gigi Saul Guerrero (born February 27, 1990) is a Mexican filmmaker and actress. She is known for creating and directing the 2017 horror web series La Quinceañera, and for her work on the 2019 series The Purge and Into the Dark.

== Early life ==
Guerrero was born in Mexico City, Mexico. She immigrated to Vancouver, British Columbia, Canada at the age of 13. She grew up in White Rock, British Columbia, and later earned a B.A. in Motion Picture Production from Capilano University, graduating with honors.

== Career ==
=== 2011–2018: Early Career ===
While studying at Capilano University in 2009, Guerrero met her future collaborators, cinematographer Luke Bramley and producer Gordon Cheng. Together, they worked on her directorial debut, the short film Dead Crossing (2011), which explored themes of immigration and horror. In 2013, she co-founded the production company Luchagore Productions with Bramley, Cheng, and producer Raynor Shima.

In 2014, Guerrero contributed to the horror anthology México Bárbaro with her short film Día de los Muertos. which premiered at the 2014 Etheria Film Night. She later directed El Gigante (2015), an adaptation of Shane McKenzie’s novel Muerte Con Carne. El Gigante was distributed in partnership with Raven Banner Entertainment and later adapted into a graphic novel.

A development executive at Warner Bros contacted Guerrero upon viewing El Gigante, which led to Luchagore pitching several ideas, one of which became La Quinceañera. Two of her shorts, Slam and Testament, created as entries in film competitions Dead on Film and Phrike Film Fest respectively, picked up awards for Best Death (Testament) and Best Picture (Slam).

Her music video, Paloma, was the opening video for 2015 Morbido Fest. El Gigante featured at Melbourne's 2015 Monster Fest and Sydney's 2015 A Night of Horror International Film Festival, and won the Jury Award at the 2016 Macabre Faire Film Festival. Her next short, Madre de Dios, starring Tristan Risk, received praise for its design and screened at the 2015 Fantasia International Film Festival.

In 2016, she won the Artistic Innovation Award from Women in Film and Television Vancouver. Later that year, she directed a segment, M is for Matador, for the horror anthology film ABCs of Death 2.5. In 2017, her short film Bestia, was praised for its style and psychological horror. It won Best Short Film at the Blood in the Snow Canadian Film Festival.

Guerrero's next production was announced as "Project Lucha". The story emerged from talks between McKenzie and Guerrero, which centred around a girl becoming a strong woman. In October 2017, the project was revealed as La Quinceañera, a launch title for Stage 13, the digital content division for Warner Bros. Digital Networks. It features Mia Xitlali and Bertila Damas and held its world premiere at the Morbido Film Festival on October 28. It won the Golden Skull Award for Audience Favourite at the festival. In 2018, La Quinceañera debuted on the Studio+ app for Canal+ territories. In June 2018, it screened at Grauman's Chinese Theatre for the Los Angeles Latino International Film Festival. Dread Central praised La Quinceañera for its characters, noting its depiction of strong women as leaders.

Guerrero wrote a video game for Capcom, which was to be announced in 2018. In January 2018, she hosted the Vancouver Short Film Festival, which closed with a screening of Bestia. She teaches directing at Vancouver Film School.

=== 2019–present: Breakthrough ===
In 2019, Variety selected her as one of the "10 Latinxs to Watch." She directed an episode of the horror anthology series Into the Dark for Blumhouse, and voiced Vida in Super Monsters. Guerrero received the job for the latter from Blumhouse after criticizing the original script for not being authentically Mexican. Guerrero insisted upon casting actors who were of Mexican descent and would switch between directing in English and Spanish while on set. To create a greater intensity for the finale, most of the episode was shot in chronological order. Guerrero's episode for Into the Dark, titled Culture Shock, premiered at the 2019 Etheria Film Night. Culture Shock addressed themes of immigration and cultural identity, receiving critical acclaim with a 100% approval rating on Rotten Tomatoes, albeit based on a limited number of reviews. However, it holds a more modest audience rating of 5.9 and has garnered mixed critic reviews on IMDb.

In October 2019, Guerrero signed a first-look deal with Blumhouse and was attached to direct an untitled project for Screen Gems, based on the mythology of Santa Muerte. In January 2020, it was announced Guerrero was hired by Orion Pictures to direct the horror thriller 10-31, to be produced by Eli Roth, however Orion decided not to move forward shortly after. In March 2021, Guerrero was announced to direct Oscar-nominated actress Adriana Barraza in the film Bingo Hell for Amazon Studios.

Guerrero stars and voices Mischa Jackson/Lebron in the animated Peacock series Supernatural Academy based on the Young-Adult fantasy books by Jaymin Eve.

== Personal life ==
Guerrero's work often draws on her Mexican heritage, particularly the cultural relationship with death. She has cited filmmakers Guillermo del Toro, Alfonso Cuarón, Alejandro G. Iñárritu, Robert Rodriguez, and Quentin Tarantino as major influences.

== Filmography ==
=== Film ===
Short film

Year	Title	Director	Writer	Producer	Editor	Notes
2014	Día de los Muertos	Yes	Yes	Yes	No	Segment of México Bárbaro
2016	M is for Matador	Yes	No	No	Yes	Segment of ABC's of Death 2½
2018	Madre De Dios	No	Yes	No	No	Segment of Bloody Bits: Shorts Compilation Vol. 2
2023	God of Death	Yes	Yes	No	No	Segment of V/H/S/85

Feature film

- Bingo Hell (2021) (Also writer)
- Jenni (2024)

Acting roles

Year	Title	Role	Notes
2014	Shooting: The Musical	Mia	
2018	The Perfect Pickup	Biker Girl	
2019	Puppet Killer	Brooke	
2019	Funhouse	Ximena Torres	
2023	Death Rumble	Veronica	
2023	God of Death	Gabriela Maldonaldo	Segment from V/H/S/85
2024	Jenni	Celina Marín	
2026	Talking to a Stranger	Patricia	Spanish: Hablando con extraños

=== Television ===
Year	Title	Director	Writer	Producer	Editor	Notes
2011	Choose Your Victim	Yes	Yes	Yes	Yes	8 episodes
2017	La Quinceañera	Yes	Yes	No	No	7 episodes
2019	Into the Dark	Yes	Yes	No	No	Episode "Culture Shock"
2019	The Purge	Yes	No	No	No	Episode "Hail Mary"

Acting roles

Year	Title	Role	Notes
2011	Choose Your Victim	Boom Op	
2015	Untold Stories of the E.R.	Bree	Episode "Cop Shocker"
2015	Average Dicks	Party Girl	Episode "Rap Culture"
2015	Diagnose Me	Young Mother	Episode "Covered in Bugs"
2015–2018	Nina's World	Rosita / Senorita Arana / Rosie (voices)	8 episodes
2016	The Switch	Isabelle	2 episodes
2016	The Wilding	Spanish Teacher	TV movie
2017	Inconceivable	Britney	3 episodes
2017	La Quinceañera	Stripper #1	
2018	Take Two	Carlina Del Rio	Episode "Smoking Gun"
2018–2019	Marvel Super Hero Adventures	Spider-Girl (voice)	2 episodes
2018–2019	Super Monsters	Vida (voice)	7 episodes
2019	Into the Dark	Paola	Episode "Culture Shock"
2019	Siren	Petty Officer Nina Lopez	2 episodes
2022	Supernatural Academy	Mischa Jackson/Lebron (voice)	16 episodes
2022	Angry Birds: Summer Madness	Stella (voice)	36 episodes
2025	PAW Patrol	Lucita Mala (voice)	Episode "Valiente: A Tracker Story"
