= Demián Rugna =

Argentine film director

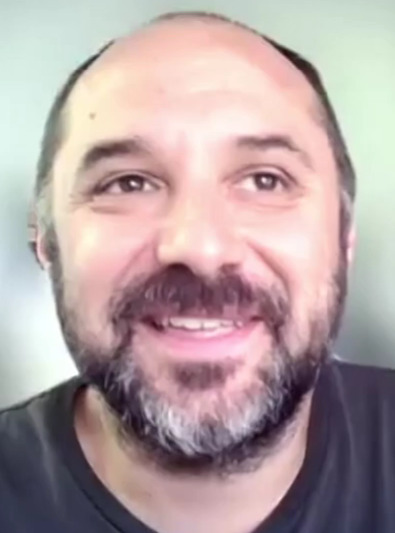
- Rugna in 2023
- Born: September 13, 1979 (age 46); Haedo, Buenos Aires, Argentina
- Occupations: Film director, screenwriter, editor
- Years active: 2002–present

Demián Rugna (born September 13, 1979) is an Argentine film director, screenwriter, and editor of horror films.

== Biography ==
Rugna was born in Haedo, Buenos Aires Province. From an early age, he made his own comic books that recreated his favorite movies. This led him, years later, to study comic illustration under Horacio Lalia, from whom he learned visual storytelling. In 2003, he graduated from Universidad de Morón with a degree in graphic design.

In 2005, after making several short films in the horror genre, he wrote the original screenplay for the film Death Knows Your Name. In 2007 he directed his first feature film, based on one of his short films named The Last Gateway. In 2008 he wrote the original screenplay They Want My Eyes.

His second feature film as a director was Cursed Bastards, which he co-wrote and co-directed with Fabián Forte. It was released nationwide in Argentina in 2013. Between 2016 and 2017, two of his films were released: You Don't Know Who You're Talking To and Terrified. Terrified was a commercial success and is considered one of the best Argentine horror films in recent years, winning Best Picture in the Horror category at Fantastic Fest. Although already a commercial success based on its performance in Argentine theaters, its release on the streaming service Netflix additionally had large viewership numbers.

In 2022 Rugna filmed his next feature film, When Evil Lurks, while participating in the project Satanic Hispanics, an anthology of horror stories from Latin American directors, with his story I Also Saw It. When Evil Lurks had its world premiere at the 2023 Toronto International Film Festival in the "Midnight Madness" section.

Rugna is working on a vampire film named Felix: A Complex Puzzle which is inspired by The Lost Boys and Fright Night. The film will be about a vampire who has to search for his missing organs after they are harvested by morgue personnel who mistakenly believe him to be a corpse when he is passed out.

== Filmography ==
- The Last Gateway (2007)
- Cursed Bastards (2011): segments Cafeomancia and El curandero
- You Don't Know Who You're Talking To (2016)
- Terrified (2017)
- Satanic Hispanics (2022): segment I Also Saw It
- When Evil Lurks (2023)

== Awards and recognition ==
- Best Feature Film at the 2023 Sitges Film Festival in the Oficial Fantàstic Competition section for When Evil Lurks.
