= Quinn Shephard =

American actress, filmmaker and film editor (born 1995)

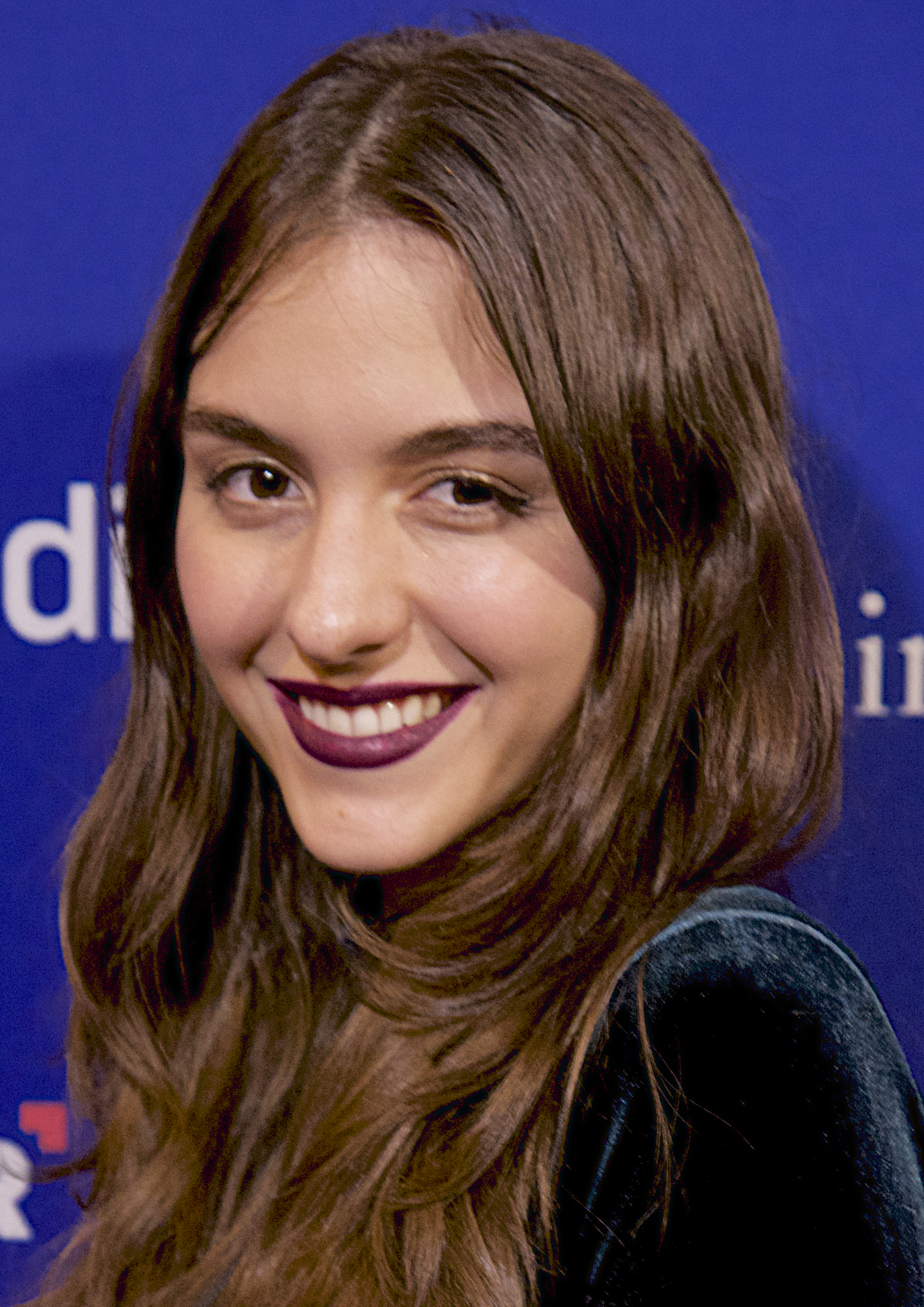
- Shephard in 2017
- Born: February 28, 1995 (age 31); New Jersey, U.S.
- Occupations: Actress; writer; producer; director; film editor
- Years active: 2001–present
- Partner: Nadia Alexander (2015–2023)

Quinn Shephard (born February 28, 1995) is an American actress, writer, producer, director, and film editor. She played the roles of Donna Malone in the Christmas comedy Unaccompanied Minors (2006) and Morgan Sanders in the television series Hostages (2013–2014). In 2017, her feature film directorial debut, Blame (which she also wrote, produced, edited, and starred in), screened at several film festivals and earned critical attention.

== Early life ==
Shephard grew up in Metuchen, New Jersey and attended Metuchen High School. This was used to film scenes from her movie Blame.

== Career ==
Shephard's feature film debut was in the 2001 French film Harrison's Flowers at the age of five. Shephard's first starring role was in the holiday comedy feature film Unaccompanied Minors. Shephard and her co-stars were nominated for Best Young Ensemble in a Feature Film at the 29th Young Artist Awards. She later appeared in the comedy film Assassination of a High School President (2008) and the horror film Sweet, Sweet Lonely Girl (2016).

Shephard has also appeared on television. In 2013, she played the recurring role of Morgan Sanders in the CBS thriller series Hostages. From 2014 to 2015, she portrayed Claire Mahoney in the fourth season of Person of Interest. Shephard has played guest roles in several television series, including Law & Order: Special Victims Unit (2011), Made in Jersey (2012), The Blacklist (2013), and Believe (2014).

In 2015, she was the recipient of the Rising Star Award at the Garden State Film Festival. In 2018, she appeared in the film The Miseducation of Cameron Post, which had its world premiere at the Sundance Film Festival; it won the Grand Jury Prize for U.S. Drama, the festival's highest honor.

=== Directorial debut ===
Shephard developed the script for her first feature film, Blame, for several years. In 2015, after her financier fell through during the first week of shooting, Shephard partially self-financed Blame using money from her college fund. The film was shot in 19 days, and Shephard produced it with her mother, Laurie Shephard. Shephard also starred in the film as Abigail Grey, alongside Chris Messina, Nadia Alexander, and Tate Donovan.

Blame screened at the Tribeca Film Festival, making Shephard the youngest female director to debut a film there. It was nominated for several awards at Tribeca and won the award for Best Actress in a U.S. Narrative Feature (for Alexander's performance). The film received generally positive reviews from critics; it holds an 80% rating on Rotten Tomatoes, while on Metacritic it holds a 54/100 rating. IndieWire called it a "solid debut", while writing that, though it "isn't fully realized", it establishes Shephard as "someone to watch". Glenn Kenny of The New York Times described the film as "earnest but underdeveloped". Filmmaker called the film "a poignant and incisive examination of modern American adolescence." The Hollywood Reporter called it "a mixed bag of a directorial debut".

Shepard's second film that she wrote and directed, Not Okay, was released in 2022 on Hulu.

== Personal life ==
Shephard is queer. She was formerly in a relationship with Blame co-star Nadia Alexander.

== Filmography ==
=== Film ===
Year	Title	Role	Notes	Ref.
2001	Harrison's Flowers	Margaux Lloyd		
2004	From Other Worlds	Linda Schwartzbaum		
2006	Unaccompanied Minors	Donna Malone		
2008	Assassination of a High School President	Eye Patch Girl		
2015	Windsor	Kat		
2016	Sweet, Sweet Lonely Girl	Beth		
2017	Blame	Abigail Grey		
2018	The Miseducation of Cameron Post	Coley Taylor		
2018	Midnight Sun	Morgan		
2020	The Man in the Woods	Jean Fenny		
2022	Not Okay	Herself		
TBA	Fade to Black	Quinn	Post-production	

==== Filmmaking credits ====
Year	Title	Director	Writer	Producer	Notes	Ref.
2017	Blame	Yes	Yes	Yes	Also editor	
2022	Not Okay	Yes	Yes	No		
2024	Under the Bridge	Yes (2 episodes)	Yes (2 episodes)	Yes	TV miniseries; also developer	
2026	The Body	Yes (4 episodes)	Yes (3 episodes)	Yes	TV series; also creator	

=== Television ===
Year	Title	Role	Notes	Ref.
2011	Law & Order: Special Victims Unit	Emma Butler	Episode: “Lost Traveller”	
2012	Made in Jersey	Kate Garretti	Episode: "Ridgewell"	
2013	Trooper	Olive Flaxton	Television film	
2013–2014	Hostages	Morgan Sanders	Main role	
2013	The Blacklist	Abby Fisher	Episode: "Ivan"	
2014	And, We're Out of Time	Scarlett	Television film	
2014	Believe	Sasha Ferrel	Episode: "Collapse"	
2014–2015	Person of Interest	Claire Mahoney	Episodes: "Nautilus", "Q & A"	
2015	Almost There	Scarlett	4 episodes	
2017	Redliners	Katie Rhymer	Television film	
2018–2019	God Friended Me	Rachel Blake	Episode: "Unfriended", "The Greater Good"	
2018	Bull	Tally North	Episode: "A Girl Without Feelings"	
