= Culture of Zimbabwe =

Zimbabwe has many different cultures, which may include beliefs and ceremonies, one of them being Shona. Zimbabwe's largest ethnic group is Shona.

== Language ==
Zimbabwe has 16 official languages, Chewa, Chibarwe, English, Kalanga, "Koisan" (presumably Tsoa), Nambya, Ndau, Ndebele, Shangani, Shona, "sign language" (Zimbabwean sign languages), Sotho, Tonga, Tswana, Venda, and Xhosa. Much of the population speaks Bantu languages, such as Shona (chishona) (76%) and Ndebele (18%). Shona has a rich oral tradition, which was incorporated into the first Shona novel, Feso by Solomon Mutswairo, published in 1957. English is spoken primarily in the cities, but less so in rural areas. Education in Zimbabwe is taught in English, Shona and Ndebele. Many rural primary schools teach in the native language until grade three; then, school is taught in English.

== Food ==
Like in many African countries, a majority of Zimbabweans depend on staple foods. "Mealie meal", or cornmeal as it is known in other parts of the world, is used to prepare bota, a porridge made by mixing cornmeal with water, to make a thick paste. This is usually flavored with butter or peanut butter. Bota is usually eaten for breakfast. Cornmeal is also used to make sadza, which is usually eaten for dinner, and by many for lunch too. The process of making sadza is similar to bota; however, after the paste has been cooking for several minutes, more cornmeal is added to thicken the paste until it is firm. This meal is usually served with vegetables (spinach, chou moellier, or collard greens), beans, and meat (stewed, grilled, roasted, or sundried). Sadza is also commonly eaten with boerewors (a sausage made from beef or pork), chicken, or curdled milk (sour milk), commonly known as "lacto" (mukaka wakakora or "amasi"). Rice and chicken with coleslaw salad is often served as the main meal. Graduations, weddings, and any other family gatherings will usually be celebrated with the killing of a goat, sheep, or cow, which will be braaied (or barbecued) for the gathered family.

Since Zimbabwe was a British colony, they have adopted some English habits. For example, most people will have porridge in the morning, but they will still have 10 o'clock tea (midday tea). They will have lunch, which can be leftovers from the night before, freshly cooked sadza, or sandwiches (which is more common in the cities). After lunch, there is usually 4 o'clock tea (afternoon tea), which is served before dinner. It is not uncommon for tea to be had after dinner.

== Art ==
Traditional arts in Zimbabwe include pottery, basketry, textiles, jewelry and carving. Among the distinctive qualities are symmetrically patterned woven baskets and stools carved out of a single piece of wood. Shona sculpture in modern times has become a fusion of African folklore with European influences. It is widely respected across the globe and it itself has had an impact on the global sculpture scene since at least the 1980s. A recurring theme in Zimbabwean art is the metamorphosis of man into beast. Cartwark, M. is of the view that, A number of finely carved soapstone figures have been found which include eight representations of birds perched on monoliths over one metre (39 inches) in height. The bird is known as the Zimbabwe Bird and does not resemble any bird in nature; it appears on the flag of the country today. Such artefacts as the soapstone figures hint at the ritual nature of the Great Zimbabwe site. Other sculptures include cattle and nude highly-stylised female figures. Simple unglazed pottery of very good quality was produced - very often given a graphite covering and then polished. Forms include gourd-shaped vessels with distinctive hatched triangular decorations, small disks of uncertain purpose, and models of huts.

Among members of the white minority community, theatre has a large following, with numerous theatrical companies performing in Zimbabwe's urban areas.

Zimbabwean art has attracted international recognition, and several artists from the country have gained audiences beyond its borders. Among the notable sculptors are Nicholas, Nesbert and Anderson Mukomberanwa, Tapfuma Gutsa, Henry Munyaradzi and "Locardia Ndandarika".

Zimbabwean sculptors have also influenced artists abroad, including African American artists who have studied under Zimbabwean master sculptors through extended apprenticeships. Contemporary artists such as New York-based sculptor M. Scott Johnson and California-based sculptor Russel Albans have drawn on both African and Afro-diasporic artistic traditions in their work, combining influences from different cultural backgrounds.

Zimbabwe's cultural wall is the durawall.

== See also ==
- Architecture of Zimbabwe
- Balancing rocks of Zimbabwe
- Education in Zimbabwe
- Reps Theatre and Over the Edge (Zimbabwe Theatrical Companies)
- Music of Zimbabwe
- Rhodesiana
