= Hylda Richards =

Rhodesian writer

Hylda M. Richards
- Born: 1898; London, England
- Occupation: Writer
- Writing career
- Pen name: T
- Years active: 1930s-1970s
- Period: 20th century
- Genres: Autobiography, Humorous Verse, Biography
- Subjects: Rhodesian Farming, Colonial Life

Hylda M. Richards (1898-?) was a Rhodesian writer. Best known for her controversial autobiographical narrative Next Year Will Be Better (1952), she also wrote humorous verse under the pseudonym T.

== Life ==
Hylda Richards was born in London in 1898. After World War I, she and her husband struggled for eight years to farm fifty acres in Kent, before deciding to emigrate to homestead in Rhodesia. She sailed for Cape Town in July 1928, travelling on by land to Salisbury. The family trained for a year on a farm near Salisbury, before moving fifteen miles away to a farm of 2,500 uncultivated acres. For some time they were crippled by debt, and they only became financially secure in the late 1930s. Next Year Will Be Better chronicled their efforts at farming there.

During the 1930s and 1940s Richards wrote humorous verse, under the pseudonym 'T', on everyday travails of the farming life. Annual collections of this verse "became something of a Rhodesian institution". A selection was published as Hurrah for the Life of a Farmer! (1958). For five weeks she also worked as temporary editor of The Weekly Advertiser, "a little weekly paper" in Salisbury.

In 1974 Richards published a biography of the pioneer Dan Judson (1864-1942), a telegraphist who arrived in Rhodesia in 1893 and led one of the relief patrols to the Alice Mine at Mazoe. In the 1970s she also provided miscellaneous contributions to the amateur history journal Rhodesiana, the journal of the Rhodesiana Society.

== Works ==
- Rhodesian rhymes for 1941. 1941.
- T for 1942: Being a Collection of Rhodesian Verses. 1942.
- T for 1943 : a collection of Rhodesian verse. 1943.
- Next Year Will Be Better. London: Hodder & Stoughton. 1952. Cape Town: H. B. Timmins, 1952.
- Hurrah for the life of a farmer!. 1958.
- "The Coming of the Trappists", Rhodesiana, 28, Rhodesia Africana Society, July 1973
- False dawn : the story of Dan Judson, pioneer. Bulawayo: Books of Rhodesia. 1974.
- "The Return of the Trappists", Rhodesiana, 32, Rhodesia Africana Society, March 1975
- "Umtali Incident" (PDF), Rhodesiana, 36, Rhodesia Africana Society: 64–6, March 1977
- "Diana Mallet-Veale: Rhodesian Artist And Her Pioneer Husband", Rhodesiana, 40, Rhodesia Africana Society, 1979
