= Racial segregation =

Race or ethnic separation in daily life

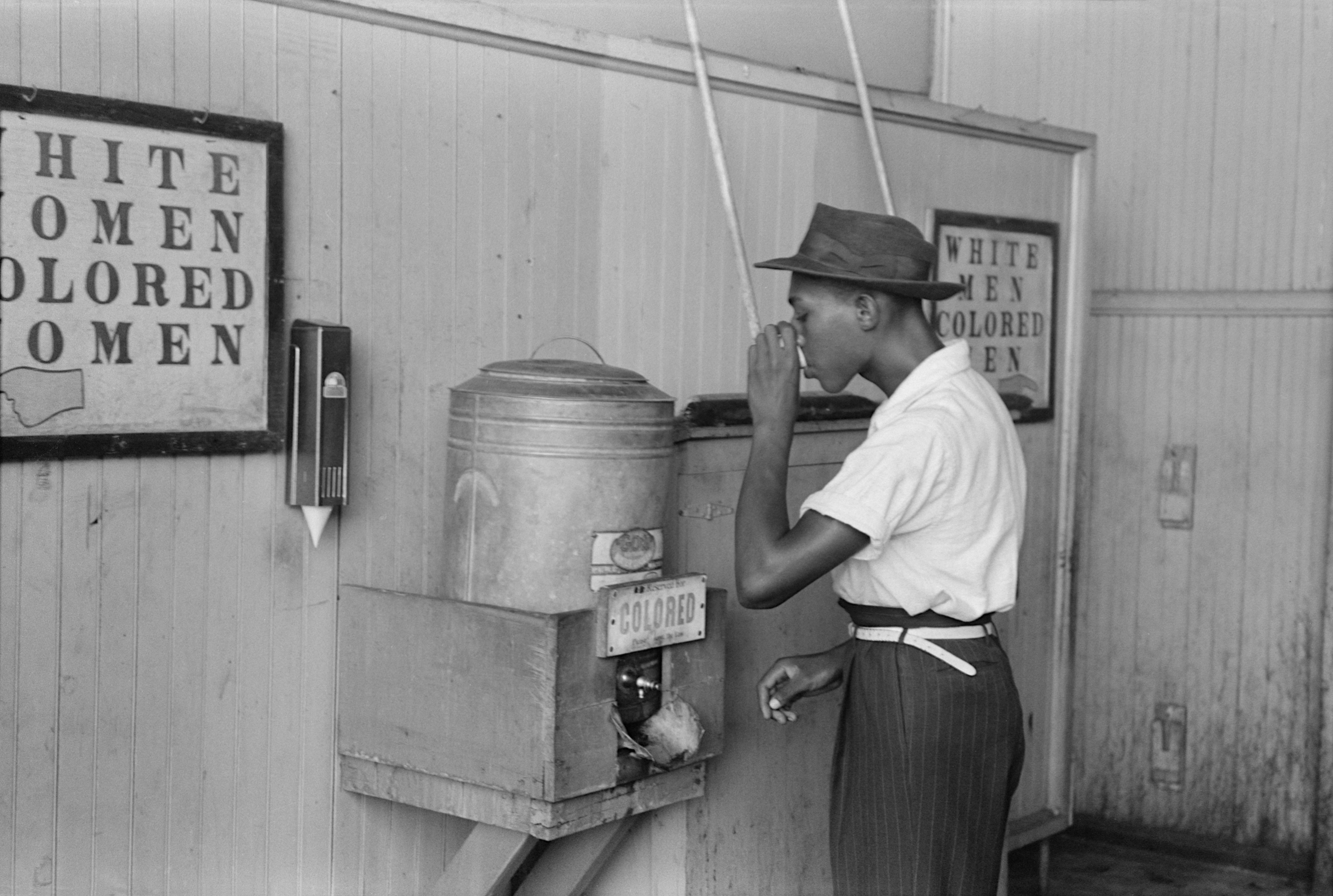
African-American man drinking from a "Colored" water cooler in streetcar terminal, Oklahoma City, July 1939

Racial segregation is the separation of people into racial or other ethnic groups in daily life. Segregation can involve the spatial separation of the races, and mandatory use of different institutions, such as schools and hospitals by people of different races. Specifically, it may be applied to activities such as eating in restaurants, drinking from water fountains, using public toilets, attending schools, going to movie theaters, riding buses, renting or purchasing homes, renting hotel rooms, going to supermarkets, or attending places of worship. In addition, segregation often allows close contact between members of different racial or ethnic groups in hierarchical situations, such as allowing a person of one race to work as a servant for a member of another race. Racial segregation has generally been outlawed worldwide. Racial segregation can amount to the international crime of apartheid and a crime against humanity under the 2002 Rome Declaration of Statute of the International Criminal Court.

Segregation is defined by the European Commission against Racism and Intolerance as "the act by which a (natural or legal) person separates other persons on the basis of one of the enumerated grounds without an objective and reasonable justification, in conformity with the proposed definition of discrimination. As a result, the voluntary act of separating oneself from other people on the basis of one of the enumerated grounds does not constitute segregation". According to the UN Forum on Minority Issues, "The creation and development of classes and schools providing education in minority languages should not be considered impermissible segregation if the assignment to such classes and schools is of a voluntary nature." Voluntary racial segregation can be explained with voluntary in-group preference.

== Historic cases from ancient times to the 1960s ==
Involuntary racial segregation was often used to secure the advantages enjoyed by a certain dominant group, e.g. Mongols, Bantu, and Aztecs.

Before modern concepts of race developed, some states enforced separation based on ethnicity or religion. In late antiquity, Roman law restricted some marriages between Roman provincials and barbarian soldiers. In Visigothic Spain, legal distinctions between Goths and Romans persisted until they were formally eliminated in 654. In medieval Ireland, the Statutes of Kilkenny of 1366 prohibited marriage and other close relations between the English and Irish.

=== Imperial China ===
==== Tang dynasty ====
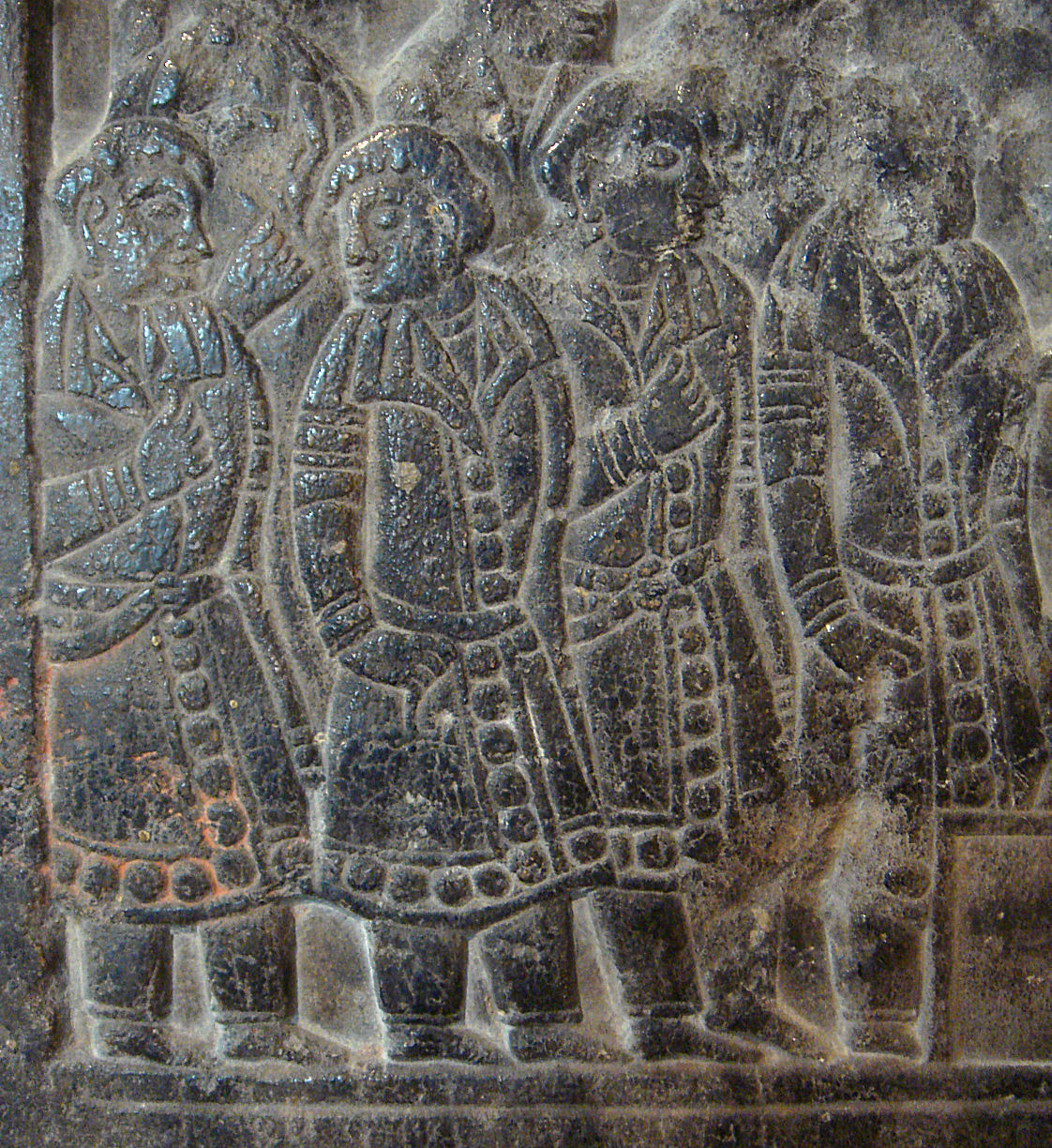
Ethnic Han were banned from forming relationships with Sogdians, depicted here on the Anyang funerary bed, circa 567/573.

Several laws which enforced racial segregation of foreigners from Chinese were passed by the Han Chinese during the Tang dynasty. In 779, the Tang dynasty issued an edict which forced Uyghurs to wear their ethnic dress, stopped them from marrying Han Chinese females, and banned them from pretending to be Han Chinese. In 836, when Lu Chun was appointed as governor of Canton, he was disgusted to find Chinese living with foreigners and intermarriage between Chinese and foreigners. Lu enforced separation, banning interracial marriages, and made it illegal for foreigners to own property. Lu Chun believed his principles were just and upright. The 836 law specifically banned Chinese from forming relationships with "Dark peoples" or "People of colour", which was used to describe foreigners, such as "Iranians, Sogdians, Arabs, Indians, Malays, Sumatrans", among others.

==== Qing dynasty ====
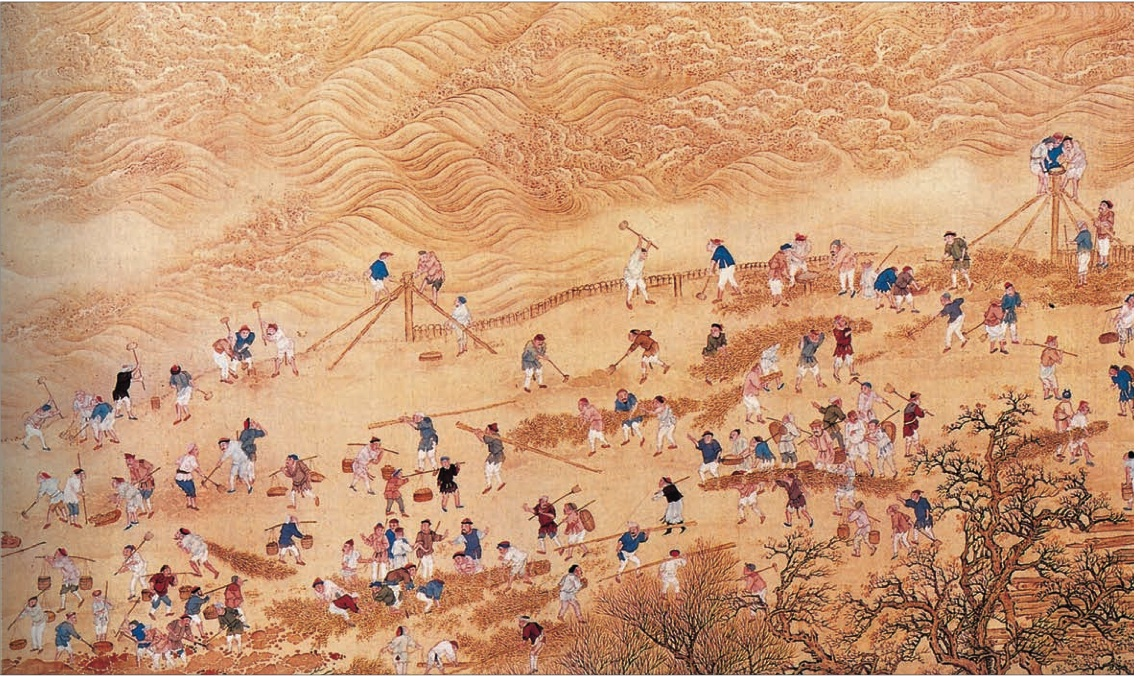
Han and Manchu people depicted together in separate styles of clothing

The Qing dynasty was founded not by Han Chinese, who form the majority of the Chinese population, but by Manchus, who are today an ethnic minority of China. The Manchus were keenly aware of their minority status, however, it was only later in the dynasty that they banned intermarriage.

From the early Qing period in the 17th century, the Qing implemented a policy of segregation between the Bannermen of the Eight Banners (Manchu Bannermen, Mongol Bannermen, Han Bannermen) and Han Chinese civilians. This ethnic segregation had cultural and economic reasons: intermarriage was forbidden to keep up the Manchu heritage and minimize sinicization. Han Chinese civilians and Mongol civilians were banned from settling in Manchuria. Han civilians and Mongol civilians were banned from crossing into each other's lands. Ordinary Mongol civilians in Inner Mongolia were banned from even crossing into other Mongol Banners (a banner in Inner Mongolia was an administrative division and not related to the Mongol Bannermen in the Eight Banners).

These restrictions did not apply to Han Bannermen, who were settled in Manchuria by the Qing. Han bannermen were differentiated from Han civilians by the Qing and treated differently.

The Qing Dynasty started colonizing Manchuria with Han Chinese later on in the dynasty's rule, but the Manchu area was still separated from modern-day Inner Mongolia by the Outer Willow Palisade, which kept the Manchu and the Mongols in the area separate.

The policy of segregation applied directly to the banner garrisons, most of which occupied a separate walled zone within the cities in which they were stationed. Manchu Bannermen, Han Bannermen, and Mongol Bannermen were separated from the Han civilian population. While the Manchus followed the governmental structure of the preceding Ming dynasty, their ethnic policy dictated that appointments were split between Manchu noblemen and Han Chinese civilian officials who had passed the highest levels of the state examinations, and because of the small number of Manchus, this insured that a large fraction of them would be government officials.

Han defectors played a massive role in the Qing conquest of China. Han Chinese generals of the Ming Dynasty who defected to the Manchu were often given women from the Imperial Aisin Gioro family in marriage while the ordinary soldiers who defected were given non-royal Manchu women as wives. The Manchu leader Nurhaci married one of his granddaughters to the Ming General Li Yongfang after he surrendered Fushun in Liaoning to the Manchu in 1618. Jurchen (Manchu) women married most of the Han Chinese defectors in Liaodong. Aisin Gioro women were married to the sons of the Han Chinese Generals Sun Sike (Sun Ssu-k'o), Geng Jimao (Keng Chi-mao), Shang Kexi (Shang K'o-hsi), and Wu Sangui (Wu San-kuei).

A mass marriage of Han Chinese officers and officials to Manchu women numbering 1,000 couples was arranged by Prince Yoto and Hongtaiji in 1632 to promote harmony between the two ethnic groups.

Geng Zhongming, a Han bannerman, was awarded the title of Prince Jingnan, and his son Geng Jingmao managed to have both his sons Geng Jingzhong and Geng Zhaozhong become court attendants under Shunzhi and marry Aisin Gioro women, with Haoge's (a son of Hong Taiji) daughter marrying Geng Jingzhong and Prince Abatai's (Hong Taiji) granddaughter marrying Geng Zhaozhong.

The Qing differentiated between Han Bannermen and ordinary Han civilians. Han Bannermen were made out of Han Chinese who defected to the Qing up to 1644 and joined the Eight Banners, giving them social and legal privileges in addition to being acculturated to Manchu culture. So many Han defected to the Qing and swelled the ranks of the Eight Banners that ethnic Manchus became a minority within the Banners, making up only 16% in 1648, with Han Bannermen dominating at 75%. It was this multi-ethnic force in which Manchus were only a minority, which conquered China for the Qing.

It was Han Chinese Bannermen who were responsible for the successful Qing conquest of China, they made up the majority of governors in the early Qing and were the ones who governed and administered China after the conquest, stabilizing Qing rule. Han Bannermen dominated the post of governor-general in the time of the Shunzhi and Kangxi Emperors, and also the post of governors, largely excluding ordinary Han civilians from the posts.

To promote ethnic harmony, a 1648 decree from the Manchu Shunzhi Emperor allowed Han Chinese civilian men to marry Manchu women from the Banners with the permission of the Board of Revenue if they were registered daughters of officials or commoners or the permission of their banner company captain if they were unregistered commoners, it was only later in the dynasty that these policies allowing intermarriage were done away with.

=== Colonial societies ===
==== Belgian Congo ====
From 1952, and even more so after the triumphant visit of King Baudouin to the colony in 1955, Governor-General Léon Pétillon (1952–1958) worked to create a "Belgian-Congolese community", in which Black and White people were to be treated as equals. Regardless, anti-miscegenation laws remained in place, and between 1959 and 1962 thousands of mixed-race Congolese children were forcibly deported from the Congo by the Belgian government and the Catholic Church and taken to Belgium.

==== French Algeria ====
Following its conquest of Ottoman controlled Algeria in 1830, for well over a century, France maintained colonial rule in the territory which has been described as "quasi-apartheid". The colonial law of 1865 allowed Arab and Berber Algerians to apply for French citizenship only if they abandoned their Muslim identity; Azzedine Haddour argues that this established "the formal structures of a political apartheid". Camille Bonora-Waisman writes that "in contrast with the Moroccan and Tunisian protectorates", this "colonial apartheid society" was unique to Algeria.

This "internal system of apartheid" met with considerable resistance from the Muslims affected by it, and is cited as one of the causes of the 1954 insurrection and ensuing independence war.

==== Rhodesia ====
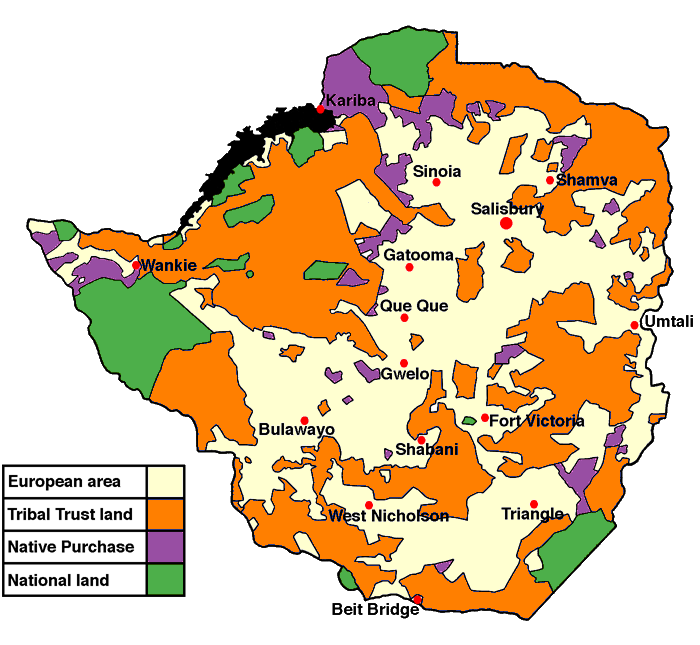
Land apportionment in Rhodesia in 1965

The Land Apportionment Act of 1930 passed in Southern Rhodesia (now known as Zimbabwe) was a segregationist measure that governed land allocation and acquisition in rural areas, making distinctions between Blacks and Whites.

One highly publicised legal battle occurred in 1960 involving the opening of a new theatre that was to be open to all races; the proposed unsegregated public toilets at the newly built Reps Theatre in 1959 caused an argument called "The Battle of the Toilets".

==== Uganda ====
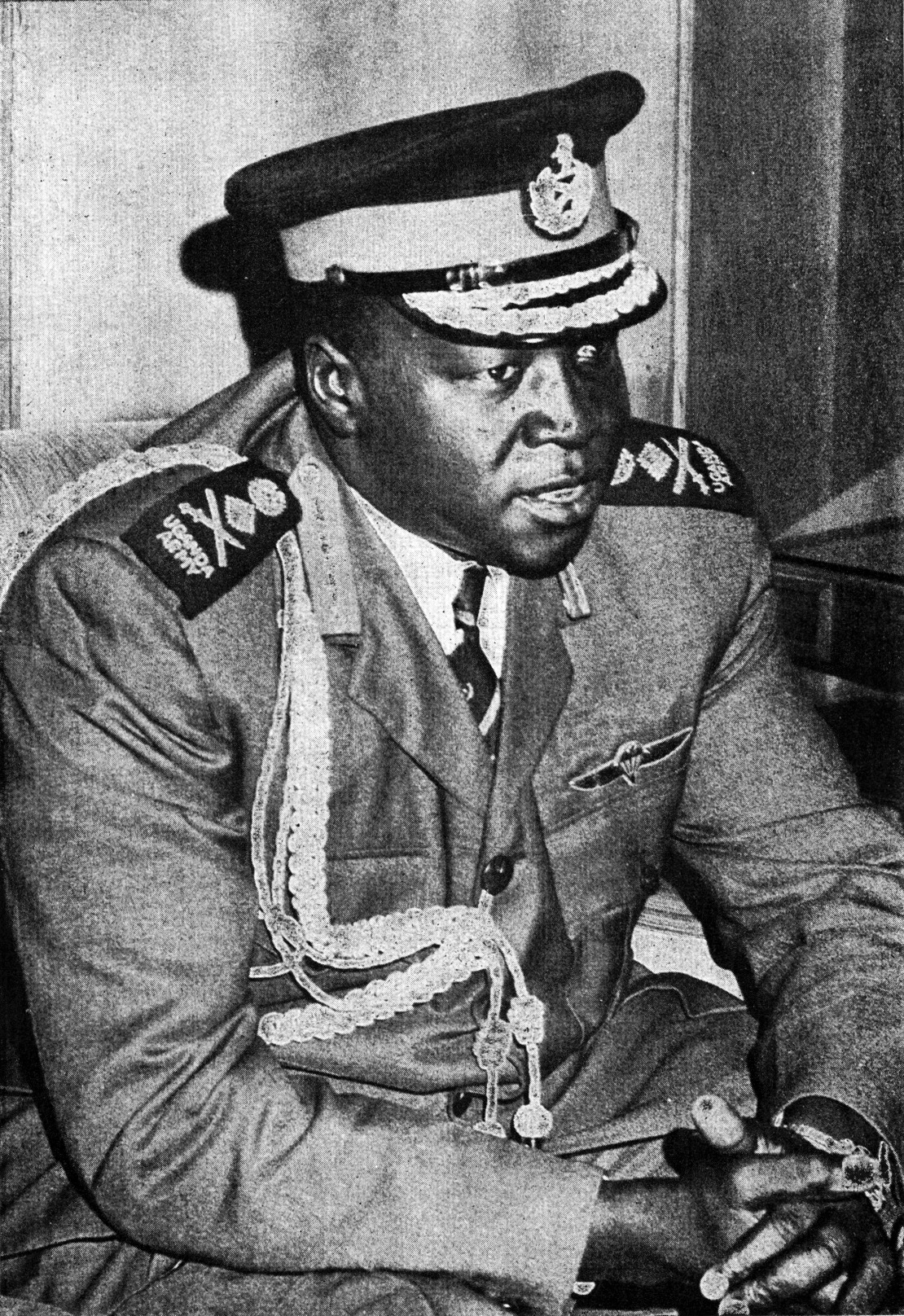
Idi Amin, pictured shortly after the expulsion

After the end of British rule in 1962, Indian people living in Uganda existed in segregated ethnic communities with their own schools and healthcare. Indians constituted 1% of the population but earned a fifth of the national income and controlled 90% of the country's businesses.

In 1972, the President of Uganda Idi Amin ordered the expulsion of the country's Indian minority with disastrous consequences for the local economy. The government confiscated some 5,655 firms, ranches, farms, and agricultural estates, along with cars, homes and other household goods.

=== Religious and racial antisemitism ===
Jews in Europe were generally forced, by decree or by informal pressure, to live in highly segregated ghettos and shtetls. In 1204, the papacy required Jews to segregate themselves from Christians and it also required them to wear distinctive clothing. Forced segregation of Jews spread throughout Europe during the 14th and 15th centuries. In the Russian Empire, Jews were restricted to the so-called Pale of Settlement, the Western frontier of the Russian Empire which roughly corresponds to the modern-day countries of Poland, Lithuania, Belarus, Moldova and Ukraine. By the early 20th century, the majority of Europe's Jews lived in the Pale of Settlement.

From the beginning of the 15th century, Jewish populations in Morocco were confined to mellahs. In cities, a mellah was surrounded by a wall with a fortified gateway. In contrast, rural mellahs were separate villages whose sole inhabitants were Jews.

In the middle of the 19th century, J. J. Benjamin wrote about the lives of Persian Jews:

…they are obliged to live in a separate part of town…; for they are considered as unclean creatures… Under the pretext of their being unclean, they are treated with the greatest severity, and should they enter a street, inhabited by Mussulmans, they are pelted by the boys and mobs with stones and dirt… For the same reason, they are prohibited to go out when it rains; for it is said the rain would wash dirt off them, which would sully the feet of the Mussulmans… If a Jew is recognized as such in the streets, he is subjected to the greatest insults. The passers-by spit in his face, and sometimes beat him… unmercifully… If a Jew enters a shop for anything, he is forbidden to inspect the goods… Should his hand incautiously touch the goods, he must take them at any price the seller chooses to ask for them... Sometimes the Persians intrude into the dwellings of the Jews and take possession of whatever please them. Should the owner make the least opposition in defense of his property, he incurs the danger of atoning for it with his life... If... a Jew shows himself in the street during the three days of the Katel (Muharram)…, he is sure to be murdered.

On 16 May 1940 in Norway, the Administrasjonsrådet asked the Rikskommisariatet why radio receivers had been confiscated from Jews in Norway. That Administrasjonsrådet thereafter "quietly" accepted racial segregation between Norwegian citizens, has been claimed by Tor Bomann-Larsen. Furthermore, he claimed that this segregation "created a precedent. 2 years later (with NS-styret in the ministries of Norway) Norwegian police arrested citizens at the addresses where radios had previously been confiscated from Jews.

==== Fascist Italy ====
In 1938, under pressure from the Nazis, the fascist regime, which was led by Benito Mussolini, passed a series of racial laws which instituted an official segregationist policy in the Italian Empire, this policy was especially directed against Italian Jews. This policy enforced various segregationist norms, like the laws which banned Jews from teaching or studying in ordinary schools and universities, banned Jews from owning industries that were reputed to be very important to the nation, banned Jews from working as journalists, banned Jews from joining the military, and banned Jews from marrying non-Jews. As an immediate consequence of the introduction of the 'provvedimenti per la difesa della razza' (norms for the defence of the race), many of the best Italian scientists quit their jobs, and some of them also left Italy. Amongst these scientists were the internationally-known physicists Emilio Segrè, Enrico Fermi (whose wife was Jewish), Bruno Pontecorvo, Bruno Rossi, Tullio Levi-Civita, mathematicians Federigo Enriques and Guido Fubini and even the fascist propaganda director, art critic and journalist Margherita Sarfatti, who was one of Mussolini's mistresses. Rita Levi-Montalcini, who would successively win the Nobel Prize for Medicine, was forbidden to work at the university. Upon the passage of the racial law, Albert Einstein cancelled his honorary membership in the Accademia dei Lincei.

After 1943, when Northern Italy was occupied by the Nazis, Italian Jews were rounded up during the Holocaust by Nazis and Nazi collaborators, with a significant portion being killed.

==== Nazi Germany ====
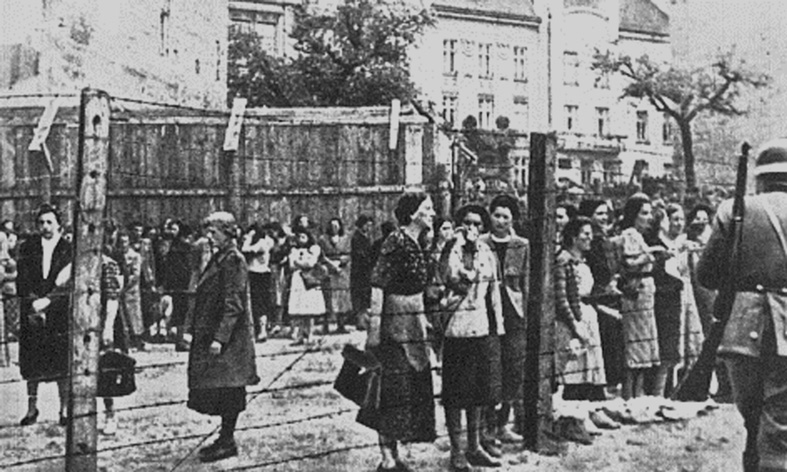
Women behind the barbed wire fence of the Lwów Ghetto in occupied Poland, Spring 1942

German praise for America's system of institutional racism, which was expressed in Adolf Hitler's Mein Kampf, was continuous throughout the early 1930s. The U.S. was the global leader of codified racism, and its race laws fascinated the Germans. The National Socialist Handbook for Law and Legislation of 1934–35, edited by Hitler's lawyer Hans Frank, contains a pivotal essay by Herbert Kier on the recommendations for race legislation which devoted a quarter of its pages to U.S. legislation—from segregation, race-based citizenship, immigration regulations, and anti-miscegenation. This directly inspired the two principal Nuremberg Laws—the Citizenship Law and the Blood Law. The ban on interracial marriage (anti-miscegenation) prohibited sexual relations and marriages between people classified as "Aryan" and "non-Aryan". Such relationships were called Rassenschande (race defilement). At first the laws were aimed primarily at Jews but were later extended to "Gypsies, Negroes". Aryans found guilty could face incarceration in a Nazi concentration camp, while non-Aryans could face the death penalty. To preserve the so-called purity of the German blood, after the war began, the Nazis extended the race defilement law to include all foreigners (non-Germans).

During the 1930s and 1940s, Jews in Nazi-controlled states were forced to wear something that identified them as Jewish, such as a yellow ribbon or a star of David, and along with Romas (Gypsies), they were subjected to discrimination by the racial laws. Jewish doctors were not allowed to treat Aryan patients and Jewish professors were not permitted to teach Aryan pupils. In addition, Jews were not allowed to use any form of public transportation, besides the ferry, and they were only allowed to shop in Jewish stores from 3–5 pm. After Kristallnacht ("The Night of Broken Glass"), the Jews were fined 1,000,000,000 ℛ︁ℳ︁ for the damage which was done by Nazi troops and SS members.

Jews and Roma were subjected to genocide as "undesirable" racial groups in The Holocaust. The Nazis established ghettos in order to confine Jews and sometimes, they confined Romas in tightly packed areas of the cities of Eastern Europe, turning them into de facto concentration camps. The Warsaw Ghetto was the largest of these ghettos, with 400,000 people. The Łódź Ghetto was the second largest, holding about 160,000.

=== Other countries ===
==== Canada ====
Racial segregation was widespread and deeply imbedded into the fabric of Canadian society prior to the Canadian constitution of 1982. Multiple court decisions, including one from the Supreme Court of Canada in 1939, upheld racial segregation as valid. The last black specifically segregated school closed in Ontario in 1965, while the last black specifically segregated school closed in Nova Scotia in 1983. The last racially segregated Indigenous school closed in 1996 in Saskatchewan.

Canada has had multiple white only neighbourhoods and cities, white only public spaces, stores, universities, hospitals, employment, restaurants, theatres, sports arenas and universities. Though the black population in Canada was significantly less than the black population in the United States, severe restrictions on black people existed in all forms, particularly in immigration, employment access and mobility. Unlike in the United States, racial segregation in Canada applied to all non-whites and was historically enforced through laws, court decisions and social norms with a closed immigration system that barred virtually all non-whites from immigrating until 1962. Section 38 of the 1910 Immigration Act permitted the government to prohibit the entry of immigrants "belonging to any race deemed unsuited to the climate or requirements of Canada, or of immigrants of any specified class, occupation or character."

Racial segregation practices extended to many areas of employment in Canada. Black men and women in Quebec were historically relegated to the service sector regardless of their educational attainment. White business owners and even provincial and federal government agencies often did not hire black people, with explicit rules preventing their employment. When the labour movement took hold in Canada near the end of the 19th century, workers began organizing and forming trade unions with the aim of improving the working conditions and quality of life for employees. However, black workers were systematically denied membership to these unions, and worker's protection was reserved exclusively for whites.

==== South Africa ====
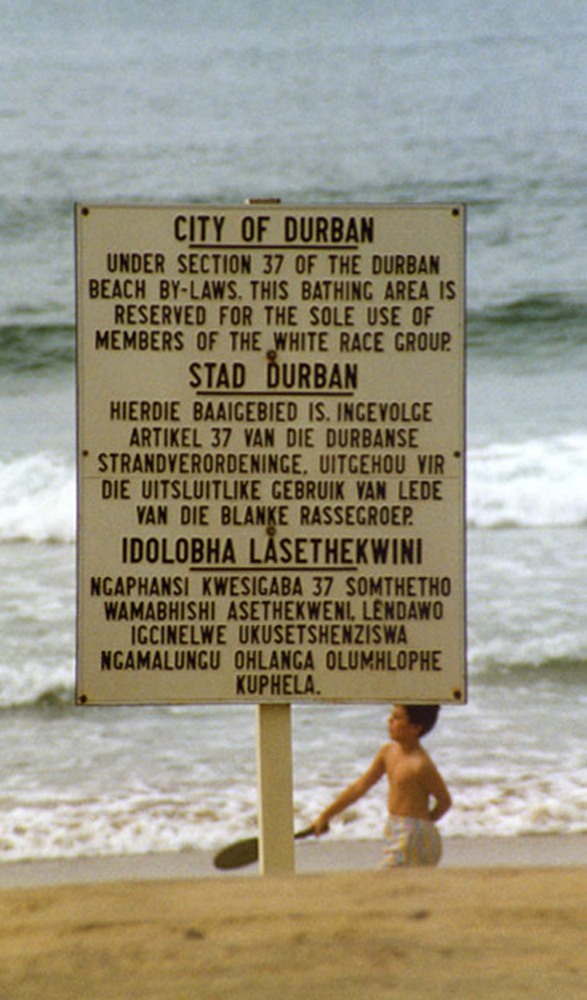
"Apartheid": sign on Durban beach in English, Afrikaans and Zulu, 1989

The apartheid system carried out by Afrikaner minority rule enacted a nationwide social policy "separate development" with the National Party victory in the 1948 general election, following the "colour bar"-discriminatory legislation dating back to the beginning of the Union of South Africa and the Boer republics before which, while repressive to Black South Africans along with other minorities, had not gone nearly so far.

Apartheid laws can be generally divided into following acts. Firstly, the Population Registration Act in 1950 classified residents in South Africa into four racial groups: "black", "white", "Coloured", and "Indian" and noted their racial identities on their identifications. Secondly, the Group Areas Act in 1950 assigned different regions according to different races. People were forced to live in their corresponding regions and the action of passing the boundaries without a permit was made illegal, extending pass laws that had already curtailed black movement. Thirdly, under the Reservation of Separate Amenities Act in 1953, amenities in public areas, like hospitals, universities and parks, were labeled separately according to particular races. In addition, the Bantu Education Act in 1953 segregated national education in South Africa as well. Additionally, the government of the time enforced the pass laws, which deprived Black South Africans of their right to travel freely within their own country. Under this system Black South Africans were severely restricted from urban areas, requiring authorisation from a white employer to enter.

Uprisings and protests against apartheid appeared immediately when apartheid arose. As early as 1949, the Youth League of the African National Congress (ANC) advocated the ending of apartheid and suggested fighting against racial segregation by various methods. During the following decades, hundreds of anti-apartheid actions occurred, including those of the Black Consciousness Movement, students' protests, labor strikes, and church group activism etc. In 1991, the Abolition of Racially Based Land Measures Act was passed, repealing laws enforcing racial segregation, including the Group Areas Act. In 1994, Nelson Mandela won in the first multiracial democratic election in South Africa. His success fulfilled the ending of apartheid in South African history. Contemporary South Africa shows high racial segregation.

==== United States ====
In the United States, racial segregation was mandated by law in some states and enforced along with anti-miscegenation laws (prohibitions against interracial marriage), until the U.S. Supreme Court led by Chief Justice Earl Warren struck down racial segregation.

After the passage of the Thirteenth Amendment abolishing Slavery in the United States, Jim Crow laws were introduced to codify racial discrimination. The laws mandated strict segregation of the races. Though many of these laws were passed shortly after the Civil War ended, they only became formalized after the end of the Reconstruction era in 1877. The period that followed the Reconstruction era is known as the nadir of American race relations.

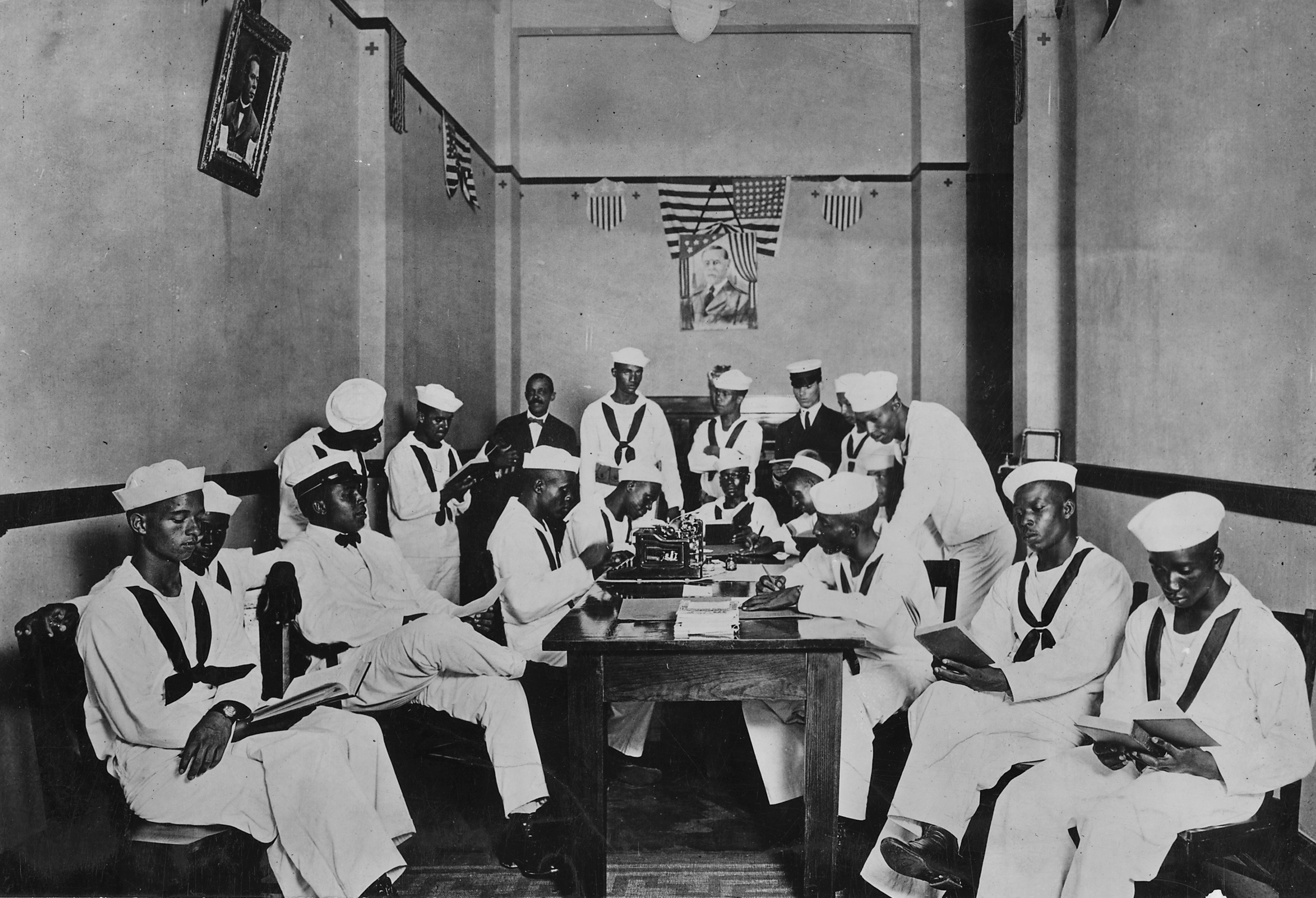
Colored Sailors room in World War I

While the U.S. Supreme Court majority in the 1896 Plessy v. Ferguson case explicitly permitted "separate but equal" facilities (specifically, transportation facilities), Justice John Marshall Harlan, in his dissent, protested that the decision would "stimulate aggressions ... upon the admitted rights of colored citizens", "arouse race hate", and "perpetuate a feeling of distrust between [the] races. Feelings between Whites and Blacks were so tense, even the jails were segregated."

Elected in 1912, President Woodrow Wilson tolerated the extension of segregation throughout the federal government that was already underway. In World War I, Blacks were drafted and served in the United States Army in segregated units. The U.S. military was still heavily segregated in World War II. The Army Air Force and the marines had no Blacks enlisted in their ranks. There were Blacks in the Navy Seabees. The army had only five African-American officers. In addition, no African-American would receive the Medal of Honor during the war, and their tasks in the war were largely reserved to noncombat units. Black soldiers had to sometimes give up their seats in trains to the Nazi prisoners of war.

A club which was central to the Harlem Renaissance in the 1920s, the Cotton Club in Harlem, New York City was a whites-only establishment, where Blacks (such as Duke Ellington) were allowed to perform, but they were only allowed to perform in front of a white audience. In the reception to honor his success at the 1936 Summer Olympics, Jesse Owens was not permitted to enter through the main doors of the Waldorf Astoria New York and instead forced to travel up to the event in a freight elevator.

The first black Academy Award recipient, actress Hattie McDaniel, was not permitted to attend the premiere of Gone with the Wind at Loew's Grand Theatre in Atlanta because of Georgia's segregation laws. During the 12th Academy Awards ceremony at the Ambassador Hotel in Los Angeles, McDaniel was required to sit at a segregated table at the far wall of the room; the hotel had a no-blacks policy, but allowed McDaniel in as a favor. Her final wish to be buried in Hollywood Forever Cemetery was denied because the graveyard was restricted to Whites only.

On 11 September 1964, John Lennon announced the Beatles would not play to a segregated audience in Jacksonville, Florida. City officials relented following this announcement. A contract for a 1965 Beatles concert at the Cow Palace in California specifies that the band "not be required to perform in front of a segregated audience".

American sports were racially segregated until the mid-twentieth century. In baseball, the "Negro leagues" were established by Rube Foster for non-white players, such as Negro league baseball, which ran through the early 1950s. In basketball, the Black Fives (all-black teams) were established in 1904, and emerged in New York City, Washington, D.C., Chicago, Pittsburgh, Philadelphia, and other cities. Racial segregation in basketball lasted until 1950 when the NBA became racially integrated.

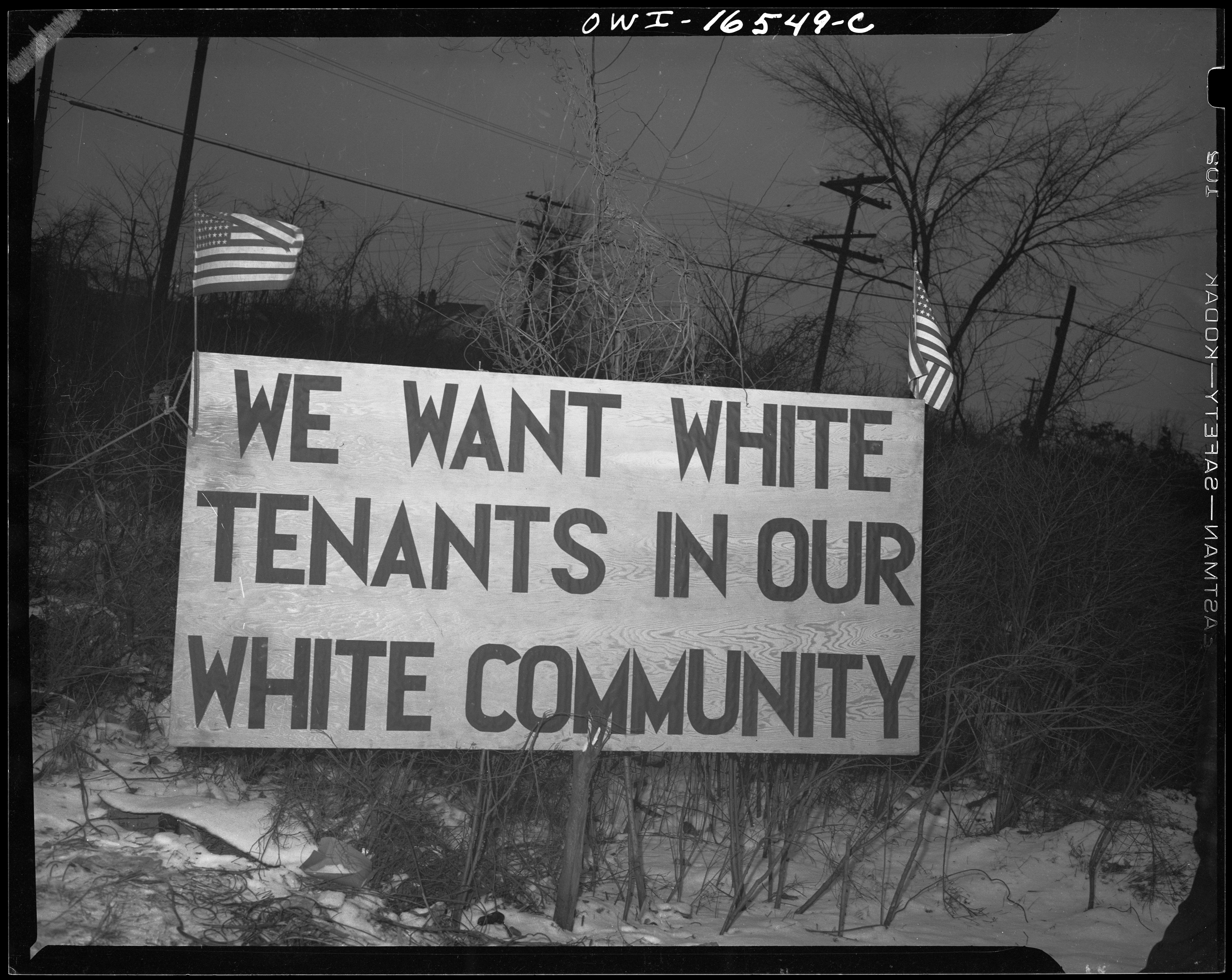
White tenants seeking to prevent Blacks from moving into the housing project erected this sign. Detroit, 1942. Photograph by Arthur Siegel.

Many U.S. states banned interracial marriage, with Maryland passing the first anti-miscegenation law in 1691. Though opposed to slavery in the U.S., Abraham Lincoln stated during the Lincoln-Douglas Debates in 1858:

"I am not, nor ever have been in favor of bringing about in any way the social and political equality of the white and black races, that I am not, nor ever have been in favor of making voters or jurors of negroes, nor of qualifying them to hold office, nor to intermarry with white people. I as much as any man am in favor of the superior position assigned to the white race".

Likewise, when former president Harry S. Truman was asked by a reporter in 1963 if interracial marriage would become widespread in the U.S., he responded, "I hope not; I don't believe in it", before asking a question often aimed at anyone advocating racial integration: "Would you want your daughter to marry a Negro? She won't love someone who isn't her color."

In 1958, Mildred Loving, a black woman, and Richard Loving, a white man, were prosecuted in Virginia because their marriage violated the state's anti-miscegenation statute, the Racial Integrity Act of 1924, which prohibited marriage between people classified as white and people classified as "colored" (persons of non-white ancestry). Although their one-year prison sentence was suspended, in 1963 they sought the assistance of the American Civil Liberties Union, which filed an appeal on their behalf that eventually found its way to the United States Supreme Court. In 1967 the court issued a historic ruling in Loving v. Virginia that invalidated all laws prohibiting interracial marriage in the U.S.

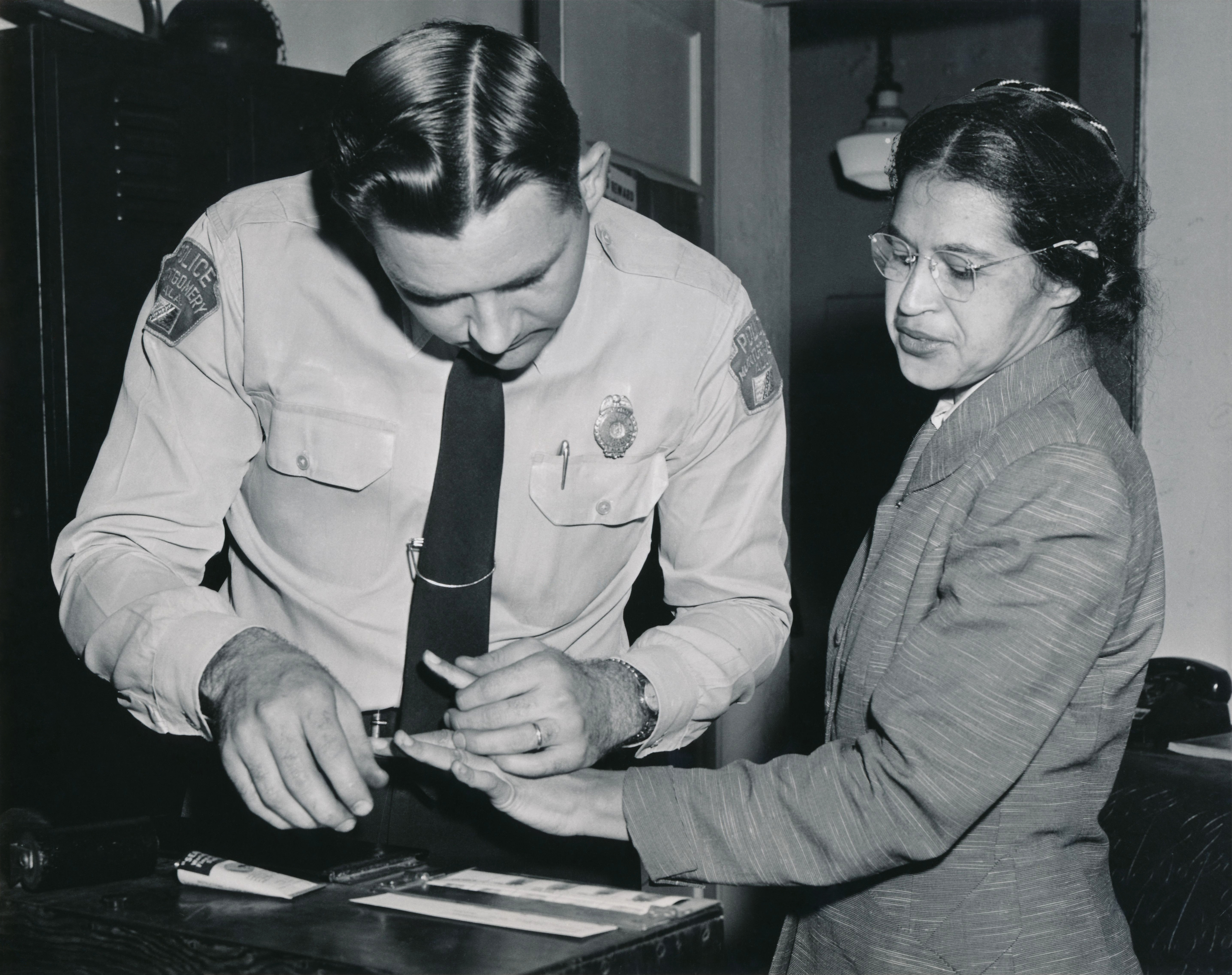
Rosa Parks being fingerprinted after being arrested for not giving up her seat on the bus to a white person

Institutionalized racial segregation was ended as an official practice during the civil rights movement by the efforts of such civil rights activists as Clarence M. Mitchell Jr., Rosa Parks, Martin Luther King Jr. and James Farmer working for social and political freedom during the period from the end of World War II through the Interstate Commerce Commission desegregation order of 1961, the passage of the Civil Rights Act in 1964 and the Voting Rights Act in 1965 supported by President Lyndon B. Johnson. Many of their efforts were acts of non-violent civil disobedience aimed at disrupting the enforcement of racial segregation rules and laws, such as refusing to give up a seat in the black part of the bus to a white person (Rosa Parks), or holding sit-ins at all-white diners.

By 1968, all forms of segregation had been declared unconstitutional by the Supreme Court under Chief Justice Earl Warren, and by 1970 support for formal legal segregation had dissolved. The Warren Court's decision on landmark case Brown v. Board of Education of Topeka, Kansas in 1954 outlawed segregation in public schools, and its decision on Heart of Atlanta Motel, Inc. v. United States in 1964 prohibits racial segregation and discrimination in public institutions and public accommodations. The Fair Housing Act of 1968, administered and enforced by the Office of Fair Housing and Equal Opportunity, prohibited discrimination in the sale and rental of housing on the basis of race, color, national origin, religion, sex, familial status, and disability. Formal racial discrimination became illegal in school systems, businesses, the American military, other civil services and the government. However, implicit racism continues to this day through avenues like occupational segregation. In recent years, there has been a trend that reverses those efforts to desegregate schools made by those mandatory school desegregation orders.

== Historic cases (1970s to present) ==
=== Bahrain ===
On 28 April 2007, the lower house of Bahraini Parliament passed a law banning unmarried migrant workers from living in residential areas. To justify the law, Nasser Fadhala, MP, a close ally of the government, said "bachelors also use these houses to make alcohol, run prostitute rings or to rape children and housemaids".

Sadiq Rahma, technical committee head, who is a member of Al Wefaq, said: "The rules we are drawing up are designed to protect the rights of both the families and the Asian bachelors (..) these labourers often have habits which are difficult for families living nearby to tolerate (..) they come out of their homes half dressed, brew alcohol illegally in their homes, use prostitutes and make the neighbourhood dirty (..) these are poor people who often live in groups of 50 or more, crammed into one house or apartment," said Mr Rahma. "The rules also state that there must be at least one bathroom for every five people (..) there have also been cases in which young children have been sexually molested."

Bahrain Centre for Human Rights issued a press release condemning this decision as discriminatory and promoting negative racist attitudes towards migrant workers. Nabeel Rajab, then BCHR vice president, said: "It is appalling that Bahrain is willing to rest on the benefits of these people's hard work, and often their suffering, but that they refuse to live with them in equality and dignity. The solution is not to force migrant workers into ghettos, but to urge companies to improve living conditions for workers – and not to accommodate large numbers of workers in inadequate space, and to improve the standard of living for them."

=== Canada ===
Until 1965, racial segregation in schools, stores and most aspects of public life existed legally in Ontario, Quebec and Nova Scotia, and informally in other provinces such as British Columbia.

Since the 1970s, there has been a concern expressed by some academics that major Canadian cities are becoming more segregated on income and ethnic lines. Reports have indicated that the inner suburbs of post-merger Toronto and the southern bedroom communities of Greater Vancouver have become steadily more immigrant and visible minority dominated communities and have lagged behind other neighbourhoods in average income. A CBC panel in Vancouver in 2012 discussed the growing public fear that the proliferation of ethnic enclaves in Greater Vancouver (such as Han Chinese in Richmond B.C. and Punjabis in Surrey, B.C.) amounted to a type of self-segregation. In response to these fears, many minority activists have pointed out that most Canadian neighbourhoods remain predominately White, and yet white people are never accused of "self-segregation".

=== Fiji ===
Two military coups in Fiji in 1987 removed a democratically elected government led by Indo-Fijians. This coup was supported principally by the ethnic Fijian population.

A new constitution was promulgated in 1990, establishing Fiji as a republic, with the offices of President, Prime Minister, two-thirds of the Senate, and a clear majority of the House of Representatives reserved for ethnic Fijians; ethnic Fijian ownership of the land was also entrenched in the constitution. Most of these provisions were ended with the promulgation of the 1997 Constitution, although the President (and 14 of the 32 Senators) were still selected by the all-indigenous Great Council of Chiefs. The last of these distinctions were removed by the 2013 Constitution.

Fiji's case is a situation of de facto racial segregation, as Fiji has a long complex history of more than 3500 years as a divided tribal nation, with unification under 96 years of British rule also bringing other racial groups, particularly immigrants from the Indian subcontinent.

=== Hungary ===
The racial segregation of Roma in the Hungary has been an ongoing issue. Over the past 20 years, there has been an increase in cases where Roma pupils have been placed in separate schools or classes. In a landmark strategic litigation case involving twenty-eight schools, Hungarian courts found that educational authorities had failed to intervene against discriminatory practices, thereby violating national equal treatment laws. Similar cases have been documented across Hungary, with multiple courts ruling that schools and authorities violated equal treatment laws by creating or maintaining segregation. Spatial segregation between Vlax Roma and Carpathian Romani in voluntary ethnic neighbourhoods can be observed.

=== Israel ===
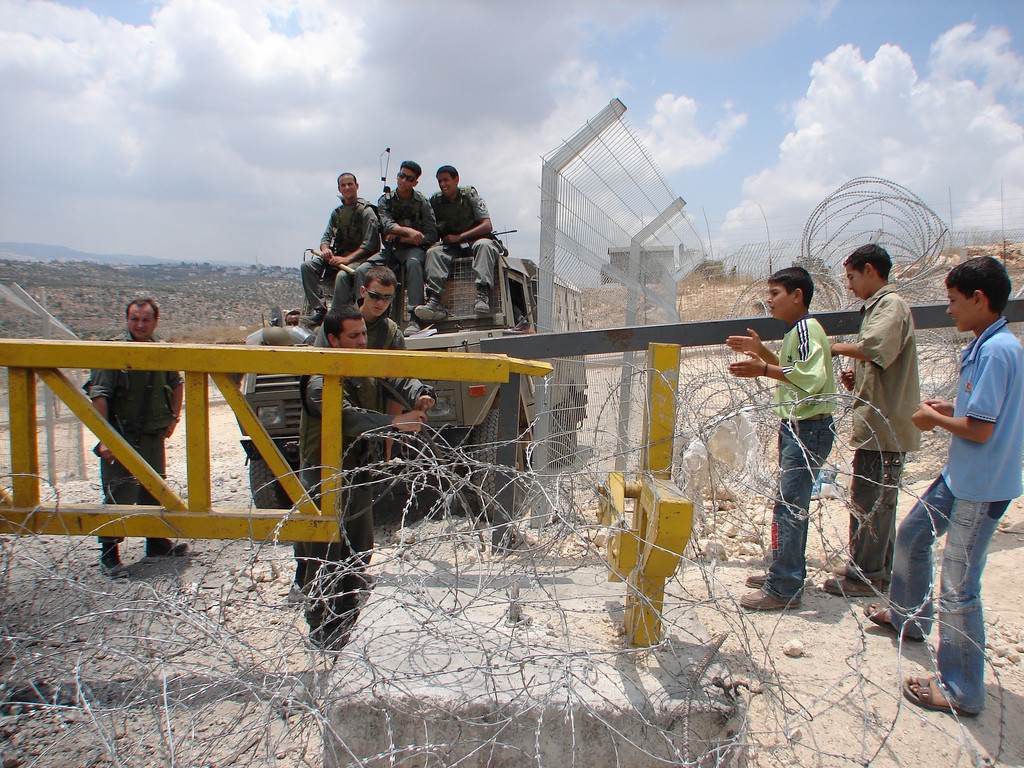
A barrier gate at Bil'in, West Bank, 2006

The Israeli Declaration of Independence proclaims equal rights to all citizens regardless of ethnicity, denomination or race. Israel has a substantial list of laws that demand racial equality (such as prohibition of discrimination, equality in Employment, libel based on race or ethnicity). There is however, in practice, significant institutional, legal, and societal discrimination against the country's Arab citizens.

In 2010, the Israeli Supreme Court issued a ruling abolishing racial segregation in a case involving the Slonim Hassidic sect of the Ashkenazi Jews. The court ruled that segregation between Ashkenazi and Sephardi students in a school is illegal. The court ruled that the school had tried "to maintain an equal level of religiosity, not from racism". Responding to the charges, the Slonim Haredim invited Sephardi girls to school, and added in a statement: "All along, we said it's not about race, but the High Court went out against our rabbis, and therefore we went to prison."

Due to many cultural differences, and animosity towards a minority perceived to wish to annihilate Israel, a system of passively co-existing communities, segregated along ethnic lines has emerged in Israel, with Arab-Israeli minority communities being left "marooned outside the mainstream". This voluntary segregation also exists between different Jewish ethnic groups ("edot") such as Sephardim, Ashkenazim and Beta Israel (Jews of Ethiopian descent), which leads to voluntarily segregated schools, housing and public policy. The government has embarked on a program to shut down such schools, in order to force integration, but some in the Ethiopian community complained that not all such schools have been closed. In a 2007 poll commissioned by the Center Against Racism and conducted by the GeoCartographia Institute, 75% of Israeli Jews would not agree to live in a building with Arab residents, 60% would not accept any Arab visitors at their homes, 40% believed that Arabs should be stripped of their right to vote, and 59% believe that the culture of Arabs is primitive. In 2012, a public opinion poll showed that 53% of the polled Israeli Jews said they would not object to an Arab living in their building, while 42% said they would. Asked whether they would object to Arab children being in their child's class in school, 49% said they would not, 42% said they would. The secular Israeli public was found to be the most tolerant, while the religious and Haredi respondents were the most discriminatory.

Some commentators have sought to find commonalities between apartheid in South Africa and the political situation in Israel. A system of apartheid, a system of institutionalized segregation and discrimination in the Israeli-occupied Palestinian territories and to a lesser extent in Israel proper. There is near-total physical separation between the Palestinian and the Israeli settler population of the West Bank, as well as the judicial separation that governs both communities, which discriminates against the Palestinians in a wide range of ways. Palestinians in the occupied territories live under military occupation and are progressively segregated, barred from freedom of movement, and discriminated against. After institutionalized segregation, Palestinians face eventual forced displacement of their homes by Israeli settlers at which point they barred from returning home, and the Palestinian areas becomes annexed into the Israeli state.

Other commentators have sought to refute these allegations of apartheid. Palestinian citizens of Israel participate in elections, are members of the judiciary, and the Supreme Court contains at least one Palestinian. Jewish and Palestinian Israelis both attend mixed colleges and universities in Israel, and hospital facilities treat all Israelis, regardless of religion or creed. Thus, while Jewish Israelis are the majority in Israel proper (comprising some 73% of the population), many Israelis maintain that there is no apartheid in Israel.

=== Kenya ===
The end of British colonial rule in Kenya in 1964 led to an inadvertent increase in ethnic segregation. Through private purchases and government schemes, farmland previously held by European farmers was transferred to African owners. These farms were further sub-divided into smaller localities, and, due to joint migration, many adjacent localities were occupied by members of different ethnic groups. This separation along these boundaries persists today. Kimuli Kasara, in a study of recent ethnic violence in the wake of the disputed 2007-08 Kenyan elections, used these post-colonial boundaries as an instrument for the degree of ethnic segregation. Through a 2 Stage Least Squares Regression analysis, Kasara showed that increased ethnic segregation in Kenya's Rift Valley Province is associated with an increase in ethnic violence.

=== Liberia ===
The Constitution of Liberia limits Liberian nationality to Negro people (see also Liberian nationality law).

While Lebanese and Indian nationals are active in trading, as well as in the retail and service sectors, and Europeans and Americans work in the mining and agricultural sectors, these minority groups with long-tenured residence in the Republic are precluded from becoming citizens as a result of their race.

=== Malaysia ===
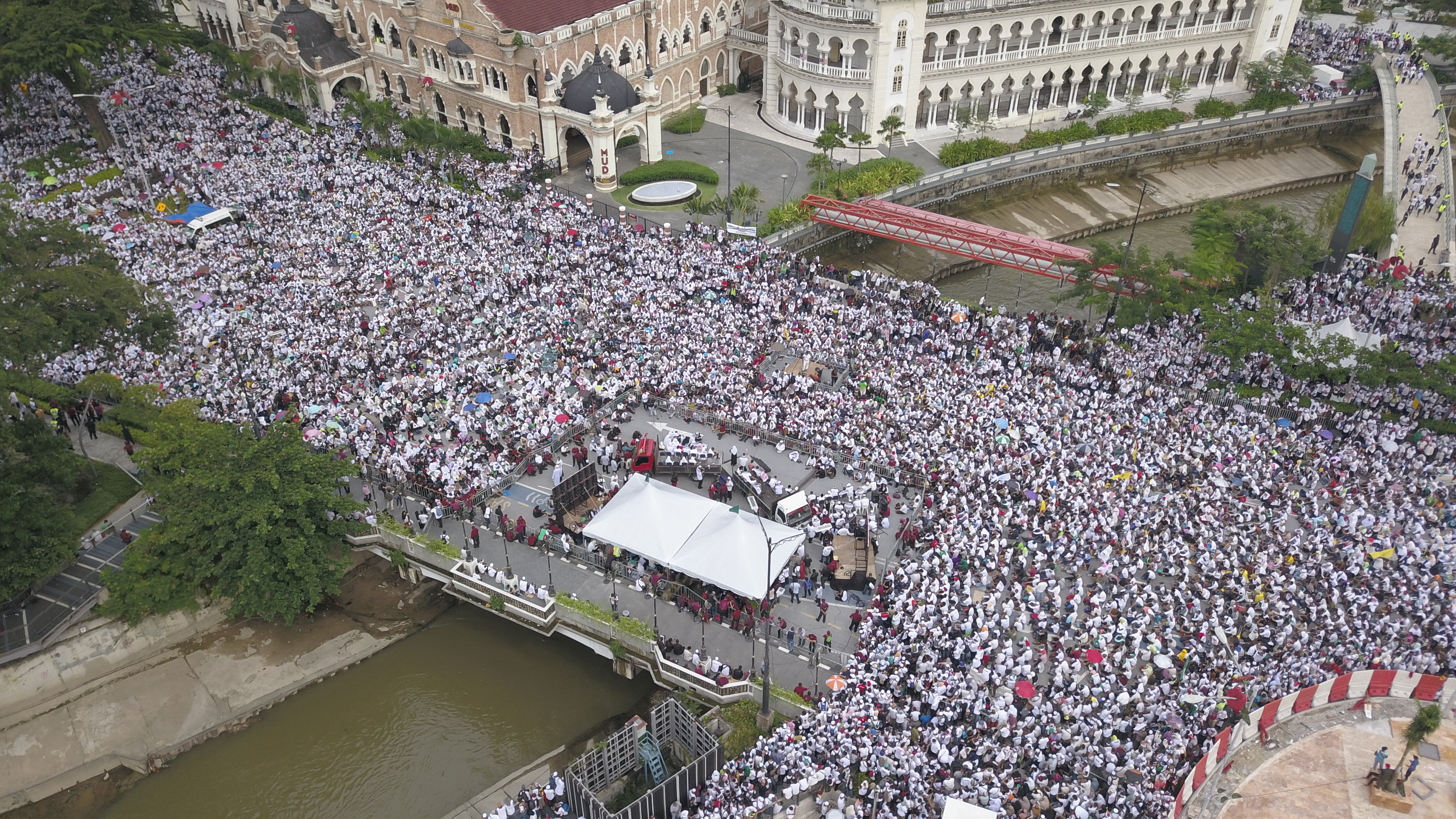
Thousands of Malaysian Malay bumiputeras protesting against the ratification of ICERD.

Malaysia has an article in its constitution which distinguishes the ethnic Malays and the non-ethnic Malays people—i.e. bumiputra—from the non-Bumiputra such as ethnic Chinese and Indians, among others, under the social contract, of which by law would guarantee the former certain special rights and privileges. To question these rights and privileges is strictly prohibited under the Internal Security Act (ISA), legalised by the 10th Article (IV) of the Constitution of Malaysia. In essence, non-Malays are treated as second-class citizens in Malaysia, facing many roadblocks and discrimination in matters such as economic freedom, education, healthcare and housing.

Malaysia is also not a signatory of the International Convention on the Elimination of All Forms of Racial Discrimination (ICERD), one of the only few countries in the world not to do so. A possible ratification in 2018 led to an anti-ICERD mass rally by Malay supremacists at the country's capital to prevent it, threatening a racial conflict if it does happen.

The privileges mentioned herein covers—few of which—the economical and education aspects of Malaysians, e.g. the Malaysian New Economic Policy; an economic policy criticised by Thierry Rommel, who headed a European Commission's delegation to Malaysia, as an excuse for "significant protectionism" and a quota maintaining higher access of Malays into public universities.

Such racial segregation policies have caused significant rates of human capital flight (brain drain) from Malaysia. A study by Stanford University highlighted that among the main factors behind the Malaysian brain drain include social injustice. It stated that the high rates of emigration of non-bumiputera Malaysians from the country is driven by discriminatory policies that appear to favour Malays/Bumiputeras—such as providing exclusive additional assistance in starting businesses and educational opportunities.

=== Mauritania ===
Slavery in Mauritania was finally criminalized in August 2007. It was already abolished in 1980, although it was still affecting the black Africans. The number of slaves in the country was not known exactly, but it was estimated to be up to 600,000 men, women and children, or 20% of the population.

For centuries, the so-called Haratin lower class, mostly poor black Africans living in rural areas, have been considered natural slaves by white Moors of Arab/Berber ancestry. Many descendants of the Arab and Berber tribes today still adhere to the supremacist ideology of their ancestors. This ideology has led to oppression, discrimination and even enslavement of other groups.

=== United Kingdom ===
Although racial segregation was never made legal in the UK, pubs, workplaces, shops and other commercial premises operated a "colour bar" where non-white customers were banned from using certain rooms and facilities. Segregation also operated in the 20th century in certain professions, in housing and even at Buckingham Palace. The colour bar in pubs was deemed illegal by the Race Relations Act 1965 but other institutions such as members' clubs could still bar people because of their race until a few years later.

The United Kingdom nowadays has no legally sanctioned system of racial segregation and has a substantial list of laws that demand racial equality. However, due to many cultural differences between the pre-existing system of passively co-existing communities, segregation along racial lines has emerged in parts of the United Kingdom, with minority communities being left "marooned outside the mainstream".

The affected and 'ghettoised' communities are often largely representative of Pakistanis, Indians and other Sub-Continentals, and has been thought to be the basis of ethnic tensions, and a deterioration of the standard of living and levels of education and employment among ethnic minorities in poorer areas. These factors are considered by some to have been a cause of the 2001 English race riots in Bradford, Oldham and Harehills in northern England which have large Asian communities.

There may be some indication that such segregation, particularly in residential terms, seems to be the result of the unilateral 'steering' of ethnic groups into particular areas as well as a culture of vendor discrimination and distrust of ethnic minority clients by some estate agents and other property professionals. This may be indicative of a market preference amongst the more wealthy to reside in areas of less ethnic mixture; less ethnic mixture being perceived as increasing the value and desirability of a residential area. This is likely as other theories such as "ethnic self segregation" have sometimes been shown to be baseless, and a majority of ethnic respondents to a few surveys on the matter have been in favour of wider social and residential integration.

=== United States ===
Voluntary segregation in the United States has increased since the civil rights movement, while official segregation has been outlawed. The Supreme Court ruled in Milliken v. Bradley (1974) that voluntary racial segregation was acceptable, as long as schools were not actively making policies for racial exclusion; since then, schools have been segregated due to myriad indirect factors.

Redlining is part of how white communities in America maintained some level of racial segregation. It is the practice of denying or increasing the cost of services, such as mortgages, banking, insurance, access to jobs, access to health care, or even supermarkets to residents in certain, often racially determined, areas. The most effective form of redlining, and the practice most commonly meant by the term, refers to mortgage discrimination. Over the next twenty years, a succession of further court decisions and federal laws, including the Home Mortgage Disclosure Act and measure to end mortgage discrimination in 1975, would completely invalidate de jure racial segregation and discrimination in the U.S. According to Rajiv Sethi, an economist at Columbia University, black-white segregation in housing is slowly declining for most metropolitan areas in the US. Racial segregation or separation can lead to social, economic and political tensions. Thirty years (the year 2000) after the civil rights era, the United States remained in many areas a residentially segregated society, in which Blacks, whites and Hispanics inhabit different neighborhoods of vastly different quality.

Dan Immergluck writes that in 2002 small businesses in black neighborhoods still received fewer loans, even after accounting for businesses density, businesses size, industrial mix, neighborhood income, and the credit quality of local businesses. Gregory D. Squires wrote in 2003 that it is clear that race has long affected and continues to affect the policies and practices of the insurance industry. Workers living in American inner cities have a harder time finding jobs than suburban workers.

Some academics have labeled the desire of many whites to avoid having their children attend academically inferior integrated schools as being a factor in "white flight" from the cities. A 2007 study in San Francisco showed that groups of homeowners of all races tended to self-segregate in order to be with people of the same economic status, education level and race. By 1990, the legal barriers enforcing segregation had been mostly replaced, although today many white Americans are willing to pay a premium to live in a predominantly white neighborhood. Equivalent housing in white areas commands a higher rent. Voluntary residential segregation remains. In February 2005, the U.S. Supreme Court ruled in Johnson v. California 543 U.S. 499 (2005) that the California Department of Corrections' unwritten practice of racially segregating prisoners in its prison reception centers—which California claimed was for inmate safety (gangs in California, as throughout the U.S., usually organize on racial lines)—is to be subject to strict scrutiny, the highest level of constitutional review.

=== Yemen ===
In Yemen, the Arab elite practices a form of discrimination against the lower class Akhdam people based on their racial characteristics.

== See also ==
- Amity–enmity complex
- Anti-African sentiment
- Black Lives Matter
- Black nationalism
- Black power
- Black power movement
- Black separatism
- Black supremacy
- Caste
- Crime of apartheid
- Discrimination
- Discrimination based on skin tone
- Ethnic nationalism
- Ethnocentrism
- Nationalism
- Nativism (politics)
- Racial discrimination
- Racial hierarchy
- Racial nationalism
- Racism
- Supremacism
- White nationalism
- White supremacy § White separatism
- Xenophobia
