= Over the Edge (Zimbabwe) =

Former Zimbabwean theatre company

Over The Edge

Over the Edge (OTE) was a Zimbabwean theatre company that existed from 1994 to 2004. It was one of Zimbabwe's most prolific and successful independent theatre companies, known for imaginative re-inventions of Shakespeare and original African works. They had a long relationship with the Edinburgh Festival Fringe and close links to Reps Theatre.

== Early history ==
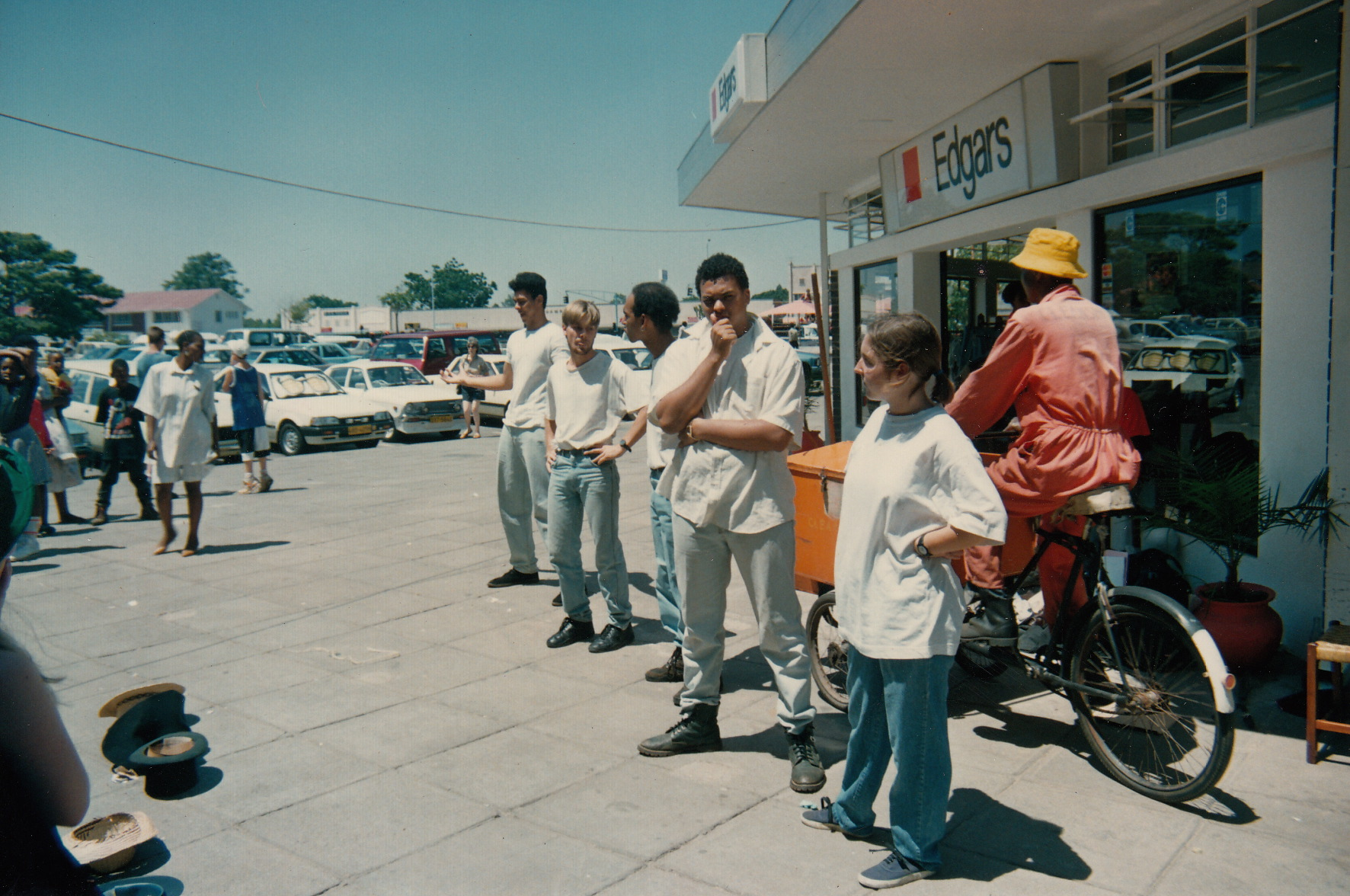
OTE at the Avondale Summer Arts Festival (1994)

Over the Edge first performed on 29 October 1994 at the Avondale Summer Arts Festival in Harare. The members had been friends for years, many having been in Repteens, and were invited to perform some street theatre. This rough and ready performance was the beginning of a long and successful relationship. The group was praised for its talent and enthusiasm but it was especially noted for its racial diversity. Although racial diversity had been standard practise in Zimbabwean theatres and theatrical companies since the 1960s, the majority of performers were inevitably white. Over the Edge, on the other hand, had more or less equal ratios of black, white and "coloured" members. For most of the company's existence Over the Edge had no formal artistic director, with all members contributing to the vision and growth of the group. Towards the end of their 10-year lifespan Wiina Msamati was appointed artistic director for a short period. The group's final theatre piece as Over the Edge was a production of Much Ado About Nothing in 2004.

The group performed numerous "re-imaginations" of Shakespeare, Arthur Miller, Molière and Joe Orten. These adaptations were often set in Zimbabwe (or in an imagined Southern African country, similar to Zimbabwe) and had many satirical references to Zimbabwe's political scene. The group also performed numerous original comic political satires, with the group's trademark extremism.

== Overseas productions ==
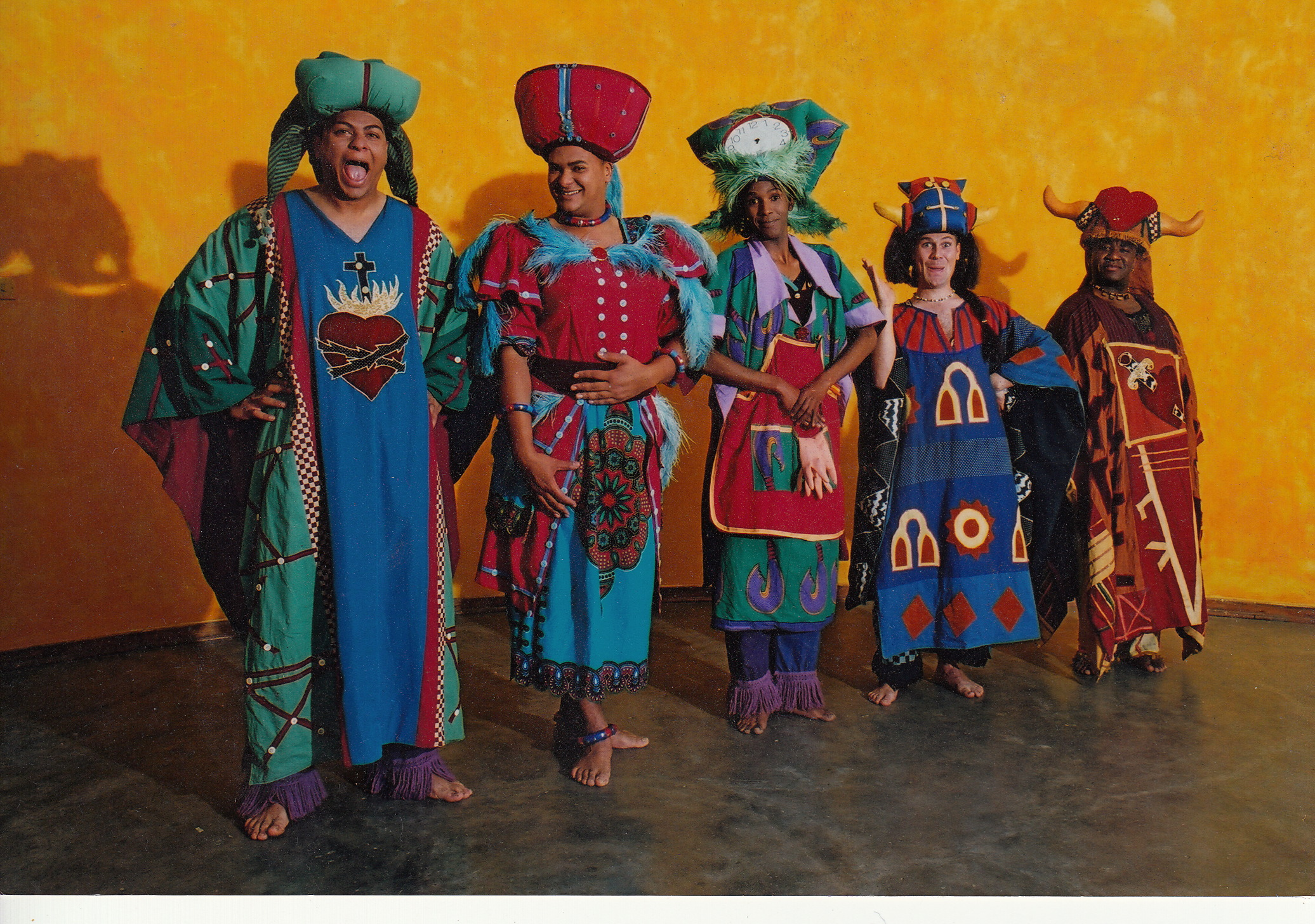
Publicity photograph of Over the Edge's performance of Twelfth Night for Edinburgh Fringe Festival

The group won international acclaim when its productions of Twelfth Night and Eternal Peace Asylum were performed at the 2000 Edinburgh Festival Fringe. The group got standing ovations, glowing reviews and packed houses. They won the "Spirit of The Fringe" award for Twelfth Night and Wiina Msamati was nominated for "Best Actor" in the Stage Awards for Acting Excellence, run by the London newspaper The Stage. The group went on to tour the United States in March 2001, playing at the American Repertory Theater in Boston and many other venues. The productions of Twelfth Night and Eternal Peace Asylum were well received by the American audiences.

In October 2000, three members of the group performed at the Amsterdam International Improvisation Festival. Their improvised production of Long Form gained an instant standing ovation. In 2006, the group, made up of Gavin Peter, Kevin Hanssen and Craig Peter represented Zimbabwe at the World Improv Championships, a cultural event attached to the FIFA World Cup in Germany that year.

== Born African ==
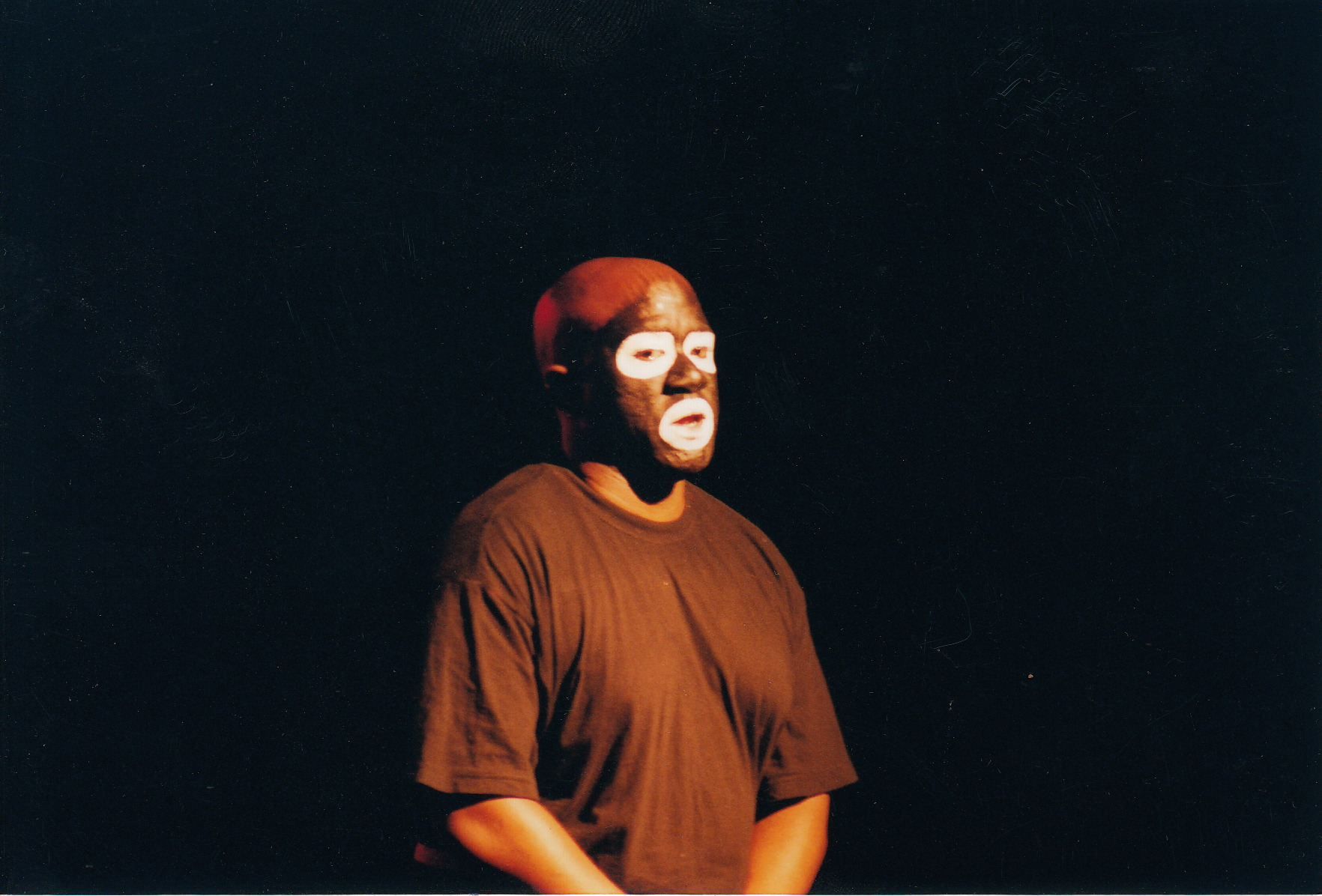
Lucian (Wiina) Msamati in Born African

Born African was Over the Edge's most successful production. Written by Kevin Hanssen, Wiina (Lucian) Msamati, and Craig Peter, with additional material by Adam Neill, it was directed by Zane E. Lucas.

The show has many characters, each actor playing multiple parts, but it centres around the lives of three people living in Zimbabwe: a white lawyer, a coloured youth, and a black servant. The production used minimal set and costume, with the donning of a single item of clothing being enough to change character. The three cast members all wore black face paint, in order to bring the characters to the same level.

The show's main strength was its portrayal of ordinary people in Zimbabwe, a view that is rarely seen in other countries. The show also portrayed lesser well-known issues, such as black-on-black violence, mixed-race relationships, and colonial hangovers. The show's central focus, though, was what it actually meant to "be African". The show ends with the characters thinking of leaving Zimbabwe, but realising that they were "born African" and deciding to stay.

The play was first shown at the Harare International Festival of the Arts, before it was reworked and shown at the 2001 Edinburgh Festival Fringe. It was critically acclaimed and the cast were nominated for "Best Ensemble" in The Stage Awards.

== Afterwards ==
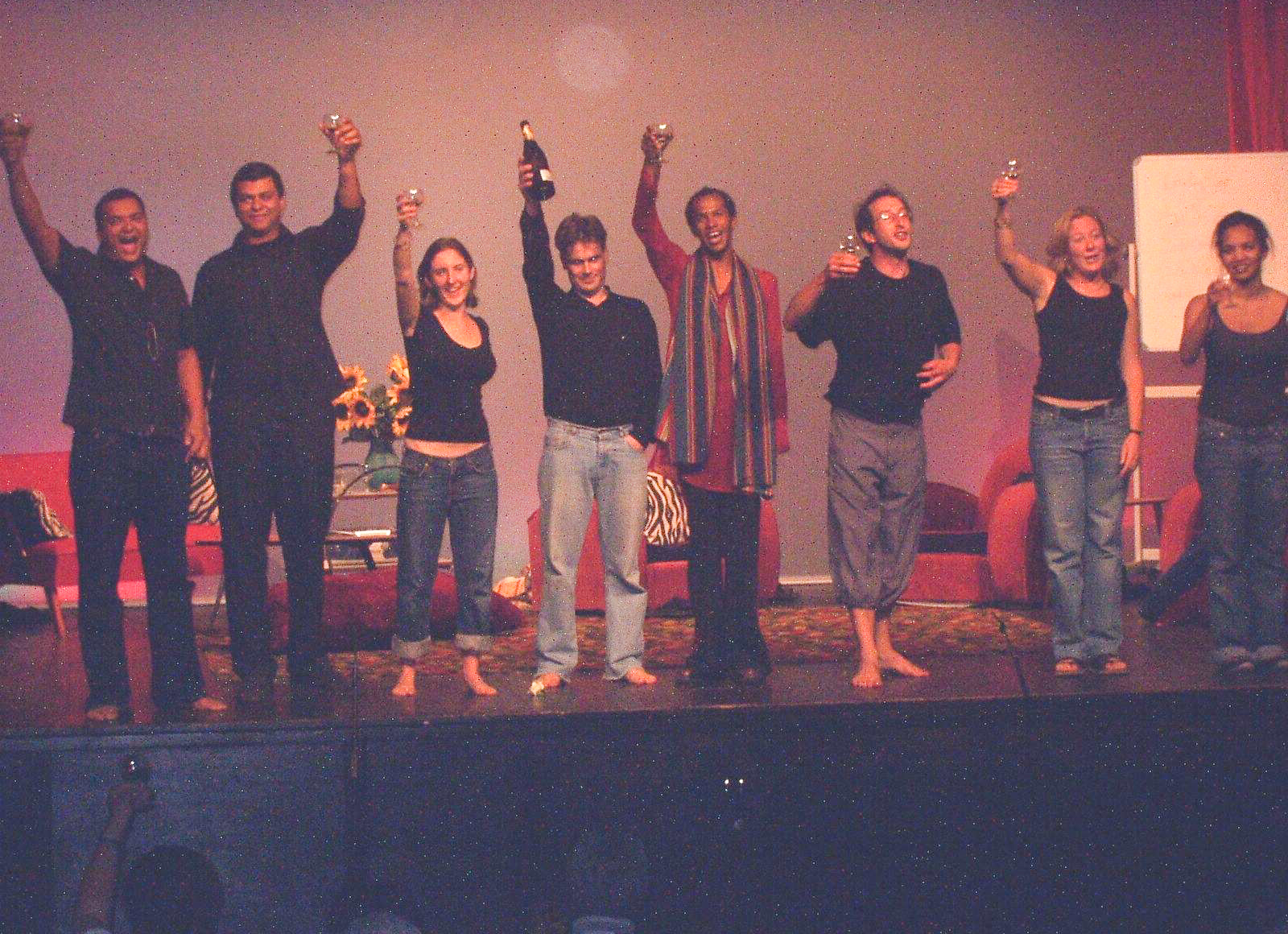
Over the Edge 10th Anniversary

Over the Edge's last show was in 2004, their 10-year anniversary, which was also a reunion of the group. Since then, the group's members are spread far and wide. Lucian Msamati (also known as Wiina) follows a successful career in the UK. Craig Peter and Zane E. Lucas went onto create a theatre development group called Theory X in Zimbabwe. Gavin Peter continued to pursue his passion of teaching, and was chairman of the Allied Arts Festival in Zimbabwe, a large performing arts festival for school students. Kevin Hanssen lives and works as a performing artist and teacher in Southern Africa and abroad. Adam Neill continues with an acting career in Cape Town, South Africa. Karin Alexander lives and works in Cape Town, and Chipo Chung continues to pursue a successful career as an actor and director in the UK and America.

== Members ==
- Gavin Peter
- Wiina Lucian Msamati
- Zane E. Lucas
- Craig Peter
- Kevin Hanssen
- Karin Alexander
- Adam Neil
- Sarah Norman
- Chipo Chung
- Shaheen Jassat (deceased)

Other notable performers who have been in Over the Edge productions include Danai Gurira, Erica Schofield, and Michael Pearce.

Over the Edge collaborated with a number of notable Zimbabwean directors and designers over the years, including Di Wilson, Dawn Parkinson, Heeten Bhagat, Stephen Hanly, Heather Cameron, Jacqui Taylor, and Laurie MacPherson.

== Plays & TV ==
- Shakespeare’s Macbeth (1995)
- The Crucible by Arthur Miller (1996)
- Molière’s Learned Ladies (1997)
- The Complete works of William Shakespeare (abridged) by the Reduced Shakespeare Company (1997)
- An adapted version of the American play Sheer Madness (1999)
- Three original plays, Completely Over the Edge (1998), Anti-Panto (1998) and Anti-Panto 0.5 (1999)
- Eternal Peace Asylum, an original play by Wiina Msamati (1999–2000)
- Loot by Joe Orton (2000)
- Improvisation and theatre games
- TV pilots: Over the Edge (1996) and Ah, foetsak! (2000)
- Born African written and performed by Craig Peter, Wiina Msamati, and Kevin Hanssen. Additional material by Adam Neill. Directed by Zane E. Lucas (2001–2002).
- Twelfth Night by William Shakespeare (2000, 2001)
- The Taming of the Shrew by William Shakespeare (2002)
- King Baabu by Wole Soyinka
- Much Ado About Nothing by William Shakespeare (2004)
