= Architecture of Zimbabwe =

The architecture of Zimbabwe is composed of three architectural types: the Hill Complex, the Valley Complex, and the Great Enclosure. Both traditional and colonial architectures have influenced the history and culture of the country. However, post-1954 buildings are mainly inspired by pre-colonial, traditional architecture, especially Great Zimbabwe–inspired structures such as the Kingdom Hotel, Harare international airport, and the National Heroes' Acre.

== Traditional architecture ==
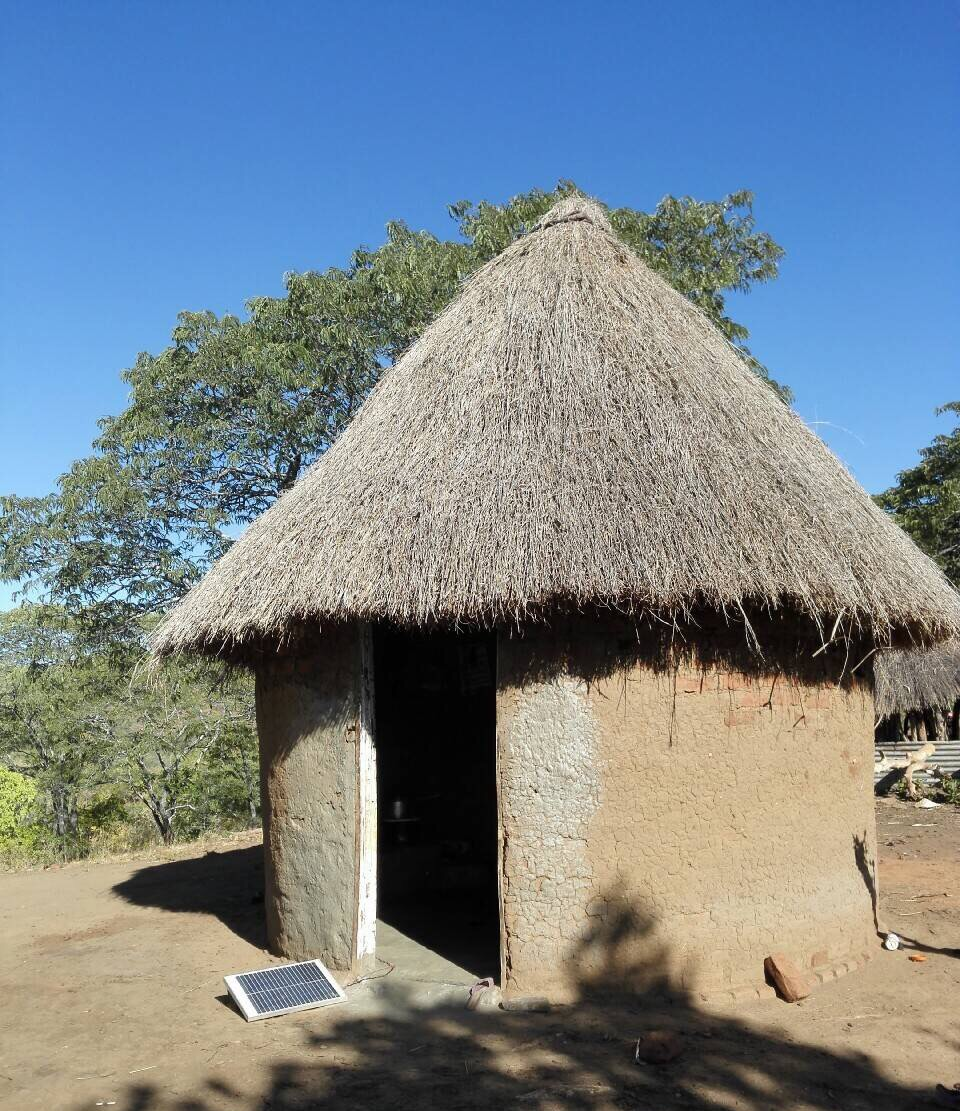
Traditional huts in rural Zimbabwe

Homesteads in Zimbabwe have remained largely unchanged since the time of Great Zimbabwe. A village in Chapungu Sculpture Park uses tall grass as a natural fence, similar to the Hill Complexes of that time. The structure of the wall combines natural and artificial elements to provide a safe space for residents. Traditional houses, especially in rural areas, still have thatched roofs with mud walls, similar to structures dating back to the stone-walled huts of Great Zimbabwe. Even earlier village huts and settlements were usually constructed from clay and sticks with conical thatched roofs. A homestead will usually consist of two huts — one for cooking and the other for sleeping.

In modern times, the walls of houses are usually built of coursed, sun-dried bricks, with rectangular doorways and brush roofs. As a result of European influence, there are now rectangular buildings with concrete walls and corrugated iron roofs. Walls are occasionally decorated with geometric designs that carry religious and symbolic meaning. For both security and decoration, iron fences are increasingly popular. The traditional practice of constructing high sleeping platforms, cooking benches, and seats continues today. Most storage huts are made from branches and sticks, which make them less sturdy than cooking or residential huts.

During the farming season, people move from their village residences to their farmhouses. Farmhouse huts are located near the fields and consist of lean-tos made with wooden sticks, resting on stilts up to nine feet tall and accessed via ladders. They are sturdy enough to support an entire family.

=== Residential arrangement ===
Residential areas generally consist of circular huts arranged around an open space, which serves as a courtyard for fire-making and revealing the presence of wild animals or other intruders. For the ruling classes, stone walls surround the family areas. Kitchens are always built in the center of each family area, with a well-decorated and painted sleeping hut nearby. There are also spaces for livestock and storage, with granaries built high-up to prevent dampness and deter insects and rodents.

== Pre-colonial architecture ==
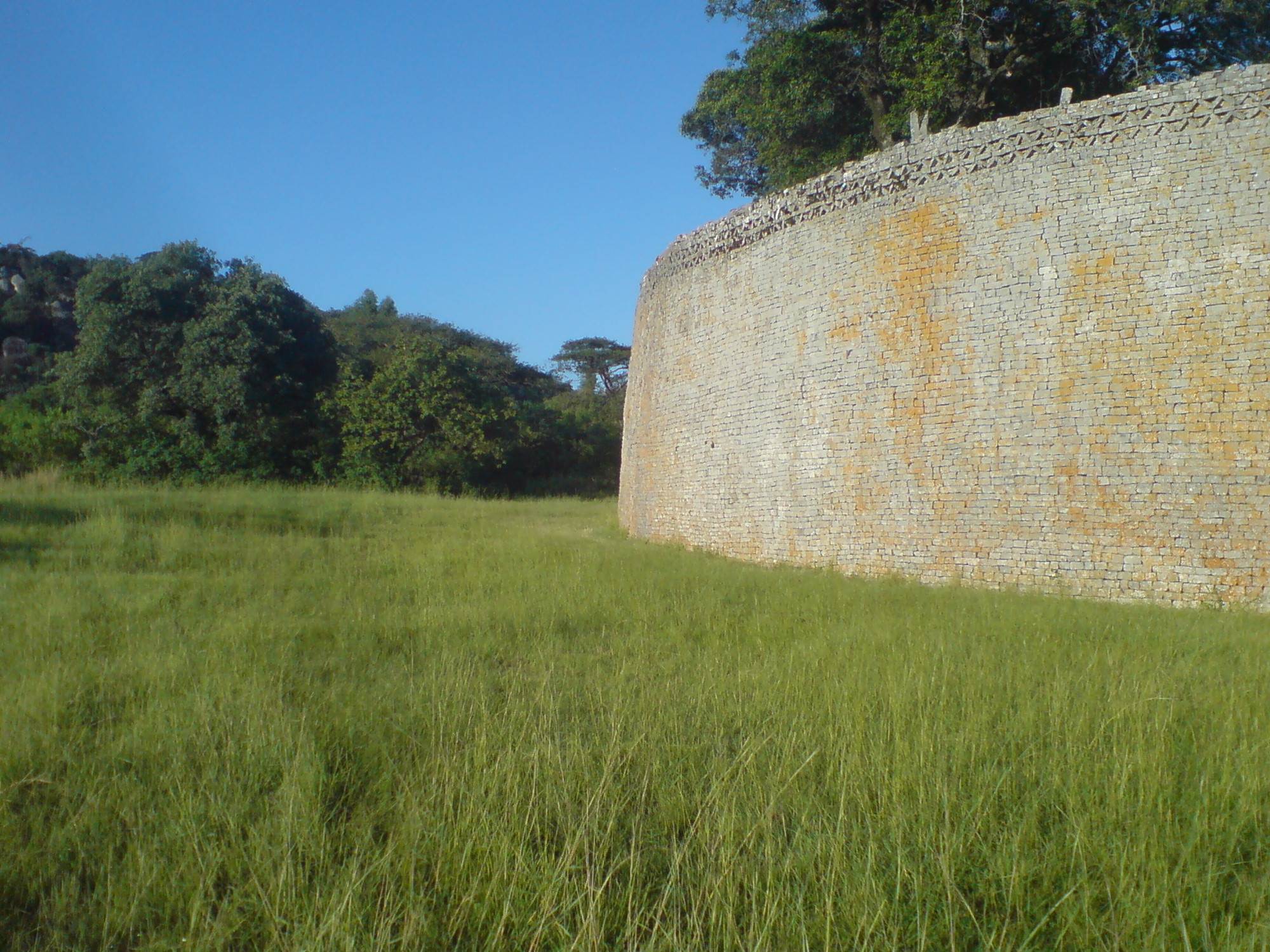
Free-standing walls of the Great Zimbabwe

During the second millennium BCE, two conventional styles of stone architecture dominated the architecture of Zimbabwe. The first style was Great Zimbabwe period architecture, which was an extension of natural elements. The well-coursed and thick stone walls were constructed on earth foundations. Well-shaped stones were used to define the external and internal surfaces, while irregular stones were used to fill interstices. Affluent people often lived in residences with nattily-constructed stone enclosures, but with crudely coursed walls are still being a part of the structure.

The second style is exemplified by Khami’s retaining walls that transform natural elements into built environments. Although structures of this period share some similarities with those of earlier periods at Great Zimbabwe, the retaining walls were introduced. The wall's top supported residential platforms with a profusion of herringbone, chevron, and checkered decor. A grouping of ten terraced platforms in Khami indicate a palace. Both Great Zimbabwe and Khami share some similarities of architectural design, with their differences being influenced by topography, weather, and the availability of building materials.

== Post-modernist architecture ==
Post-modernism is considered an attempt to rebuild a relationship to the past. It can also be seen as a re-creation of the community using vernacular forms; it tries to highlight the concepts of identity associated with local cultures that were marginalized by modernism. Since 1990, several monuments and buildings constructed in Zimbabwe exhibit features of pre-colonial architecture. They can be seen as architectural styles vitalized by Zimbabwe's rich historical and archaeological inheritance, and highlight the role that heritage can play in contemporary architecture.

=== The Kingdom Hotel ===
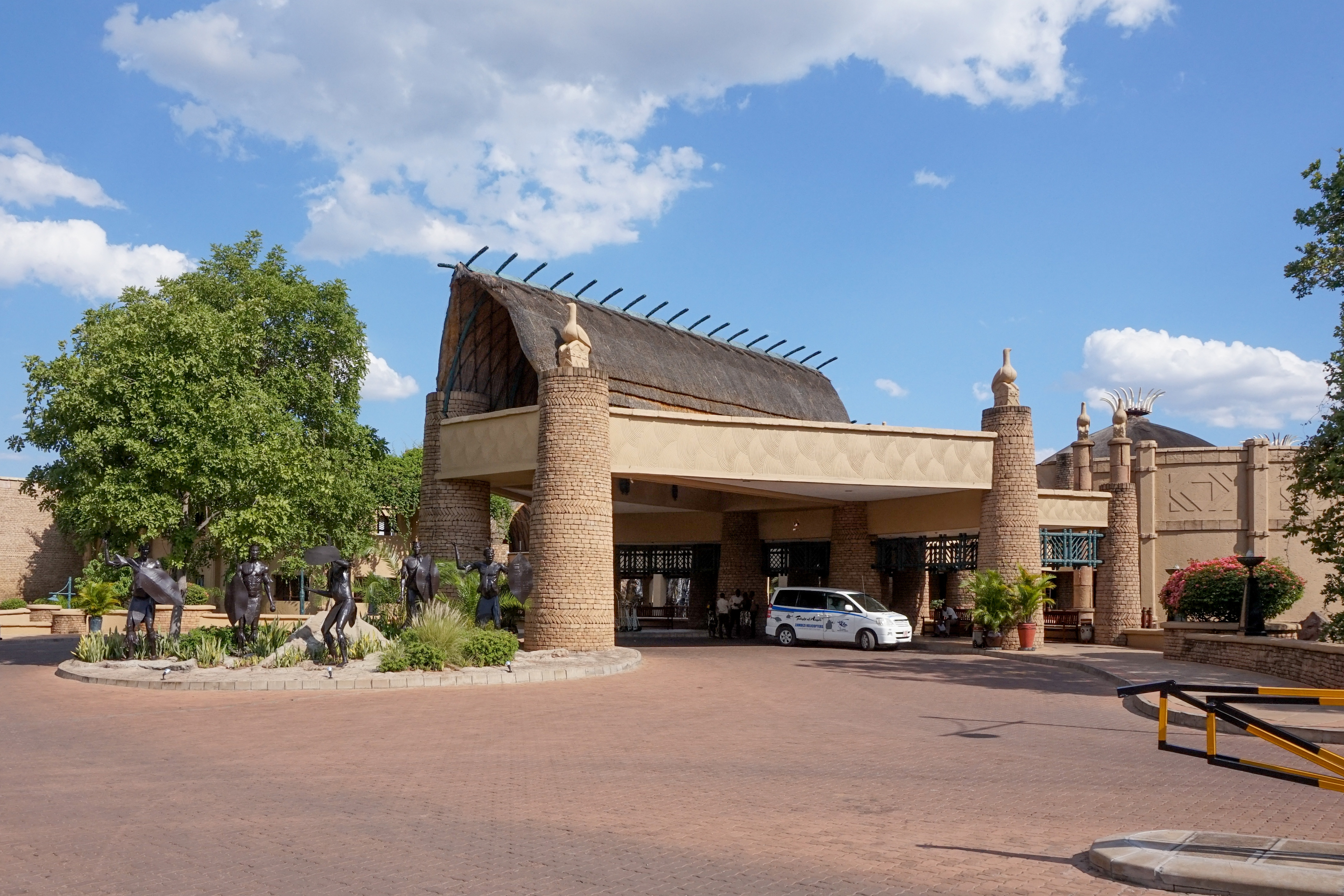
Kingdom Hotel located near Victoria Falls

The Kingdom Hotel complex was constructed near the Victoria Falls world heritage site. It provides entertainment facilities within a traditional Africa architectural context. The foyer, lobby, casino, and entrance courtyard have a rounded design, with a domed roof that incorporates grass. The design of the roof significantly evokes the traditional architecture of Zimbabwe. Adjacent to the casino, guest rooms are arranged in twelve complexes on a curvilinear plan. Alongside these buildings, there is an artificial lake on which the structures seem to float, suggesting a moat at times. There are seven giant columns around the foyer, with carved Zimbabwe birds on each of them. Well-shaped stones were accurately coursed between each column, which evokes the free-standing walls at Great Zimbabwe. Around the waterfall, walls are painted with horizontal chord patterns from top to bottom. Aslant timber beams are part of the roof. The exterior of the entire hotel is surrounded by iron stakes, with spearheads and chevron patterns on them. Although most structures of this hotel are painted in brown and well plastered, traditional stone works are widely seen. The use of wooden roof beam reflects traditional architectural styles of Zimbabwe, and the chevron design can also be found in the Great Enclosure at ruined Great Zimbabwe.

=== Reserve Bank of Zimbabwe ===
The Reserve Bank of Zimbabwe (RBZ) was opened on 31 May 1996 by Robert Mugabe. It represents the financial nerve center of Zimbabwe, and is regarded as the most technologically advanced building of Zimbabwe's post-modern era. The building was the most expensive ever constructed in Harare city. The design of the RBZ complex was modeled on the conical tower of Great Zimbabwe. Inside the complex tower, there are five podium levels and 23 office levels; immediately below is the basement – and an annex, behind the building, is the car parking area. The walls are polished granite, etched with images of rural Zimbabwe. The design was influenced by the symbolism of Shona rulers, which references agricultural production and the need of surplus food reserves to be well maintained against prolonged periods of drought. These food reserves are stored in specially made grain silos that have a broad base and that taper toward the top. The silo's conical roof was meant to prevent the whole structure from rain. In Shona society, a king receives grain as tributes and the grain silos, therefore, can be considered as a representation of authority, as the RBZ building represents that of the modern state. Therefore, the use of pre-colonial architectural styles, and the symbols incorporated in a post-modernist structure, can evoke the value of pre-colonial culture.

=== Harare International Airport ===
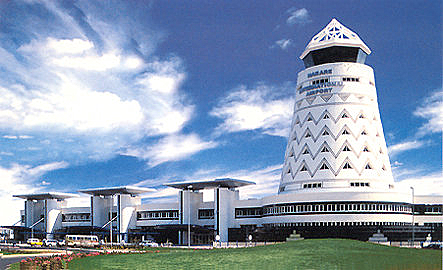
Harare International Airport

The Harare International Airport's new terminal is different from the airport's other terminals. It was built during the postmodernist era, inspired by the decorative designs found in Great Zimbabwe. The government had the clear intention of creating a unique Zimbabwean-style structure when constructing the terminal building. This was intended to promote Zimbabwe's economy by boosting the travel industry and marketing Zimbabwe to other countries.

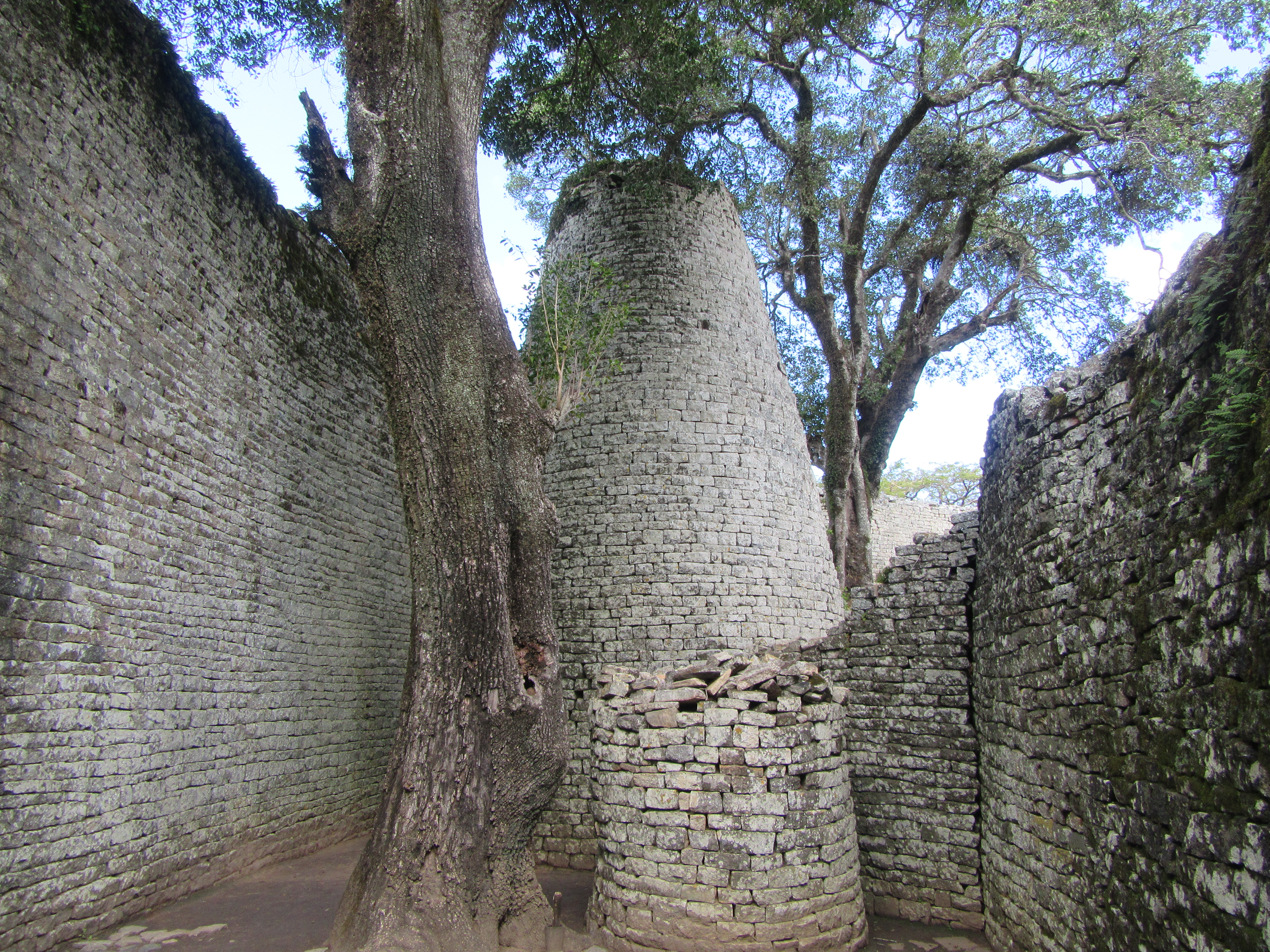
The conical Tower inside the Great Enclosure, Great Zimbabwe.

The windows of the terminal station are arranged within horizontal chevron patterns inspired by the pattern inside Great Zimbabwe's Great Enclosure, a pattern that has been frequently incorporated in Zimbabwe's post-colonial architecture. The most impressive feature of this structure is the control tower, whose design incorporates the conical features of Great Zimbabwe's Conical Tower, which is inside the Great Enclosure. The control tower, as the focal point of airport communications and airplane control, is symbolic, similarly to the symbolism of the Conical Tower, which symbolized the importance of the old capital and served as a focal point of the Shona state.

The air bridges that serve as passageways for passengers' airplane boarding, protrude from the main terminal and, their exteriors appropriately decorated, are reminders of the passages leading to the Conical Tower inside the Great Enclosure. In contrast, the passageways' interior design is modern and lacking the traditional Zimbabwean architectural style. The only exception is a snack bar that is surrounded by four conical towers. As post-modernist architecture, Harare International Airport provides clues to better interpret the meaning of pre-colonial architecture, such as the Conical Tower at Great Zimbabwe.

== National Heroes' Acre ==
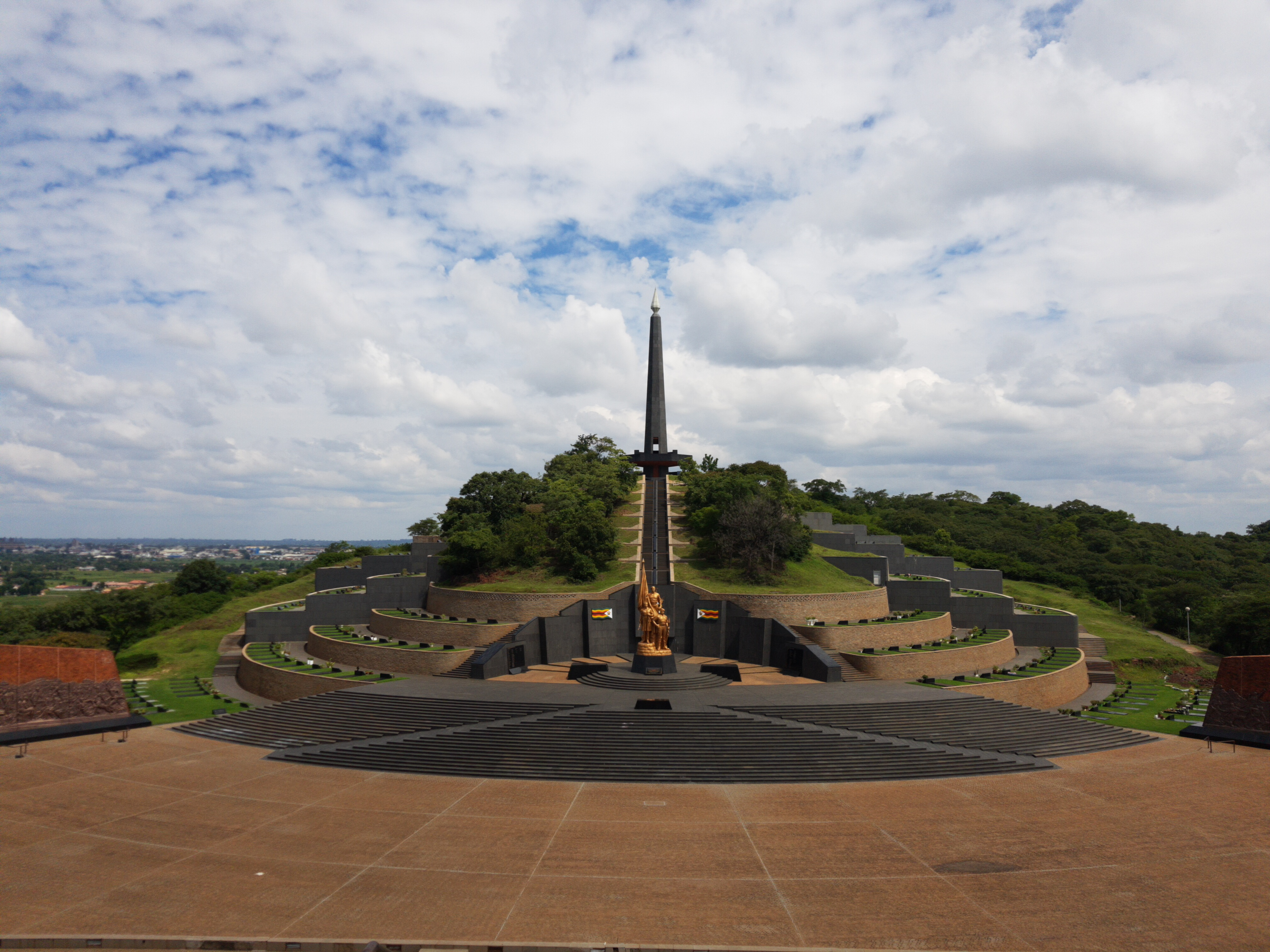
Front view of the National Heroes’ Acre.

The National Heroes' Acre is located 11 kilometres (7 miles) from Harare. Its construction was initiated in September 1981—one year after Zimbabwe officially gained independence and can therefore be considered a structure of the post-independence period—with the assistance of architects from North Korea, where a pre-colonial architectural style had also found favor. It includes a well-paved open space where the leader of the state can host a gathering, which sits between two terraced hills. There are two trapezoidal structures, made of slate, to the north and south of the open space.

The history of the emancipation struggle is recorded in the forms of plaques on wall panels. At the top of each trapezoidal structure, there are two moldings of the Zimbabwe Bird (bateleur eagle), which are enameled in bronze. From the open space towards the east of the hill, numbers of low circular steps connect to an octahedral dais. Three huge statues of liberation war heroes were built on the dais with one of them holding the national flag of Zimbabwe. Below the statues is a black granite rectangular structure which represents the Tomb of the unknown heroes who sacrificed for the country.

During the annual Heroes' Day ceremony, flowers are placed on the foot of the dais, which is the most sacred portion of the entire shrine, and it serves as a boundary between the two parts of the site. There are four mostly undecorated curvilinear granite-walled terraces on each side, with the topmost wall having a series of chevron patterns as decoration. These patterns were inspired by those found on the wall inside the Great Enclosure at Great Zimbabwe. Burial tombs are beneath the terraces' surfaces, and these terraces are reminiscent of the Khami and symbolize human impact on the natural environment. Stairs lead to the landing at the north and lower south ends, adjacent to the tomb of the unknown soldier. These steps meet on the fourth level with a narrow passage at the junction, both sides of which are elaborately decorated, and lead to the 40-metre (130 ft) Freedom Tower, which rises from the summit of the hill.
