= Rhodesiana =

Term for artifacts from Rhodesia

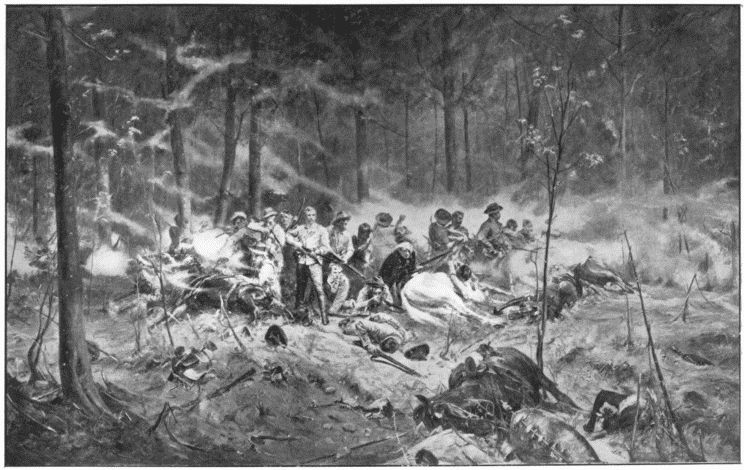
There Were No Survivors, a painting depicting the last stand of the Shangani Patrol. Both the painting and the story of the patrol could be considered Rhodesiana.

Rhodesiana is any artifact, or collection of artifacts, which is related to the history, geography, folklore, and cultural heritage of Rhodesia, the name used before 1980 to refer to modern Zimbabwe (and, before 1964, contemporary Zambia as well). Many objects, both physical and immaterial, can be defined as "Rhodesiana"; a painting of a Rhodesian landscape, for example, could be considered as such, as well as a song by a Rhodesian artist or a tale or personality from the country's history. The things involved need not be old, but need to possess relevant associations with Rhodesia; for Rhodesian people and their descendants, a piece of Rhodesiana will commonly arouse feelings of patriotism and nostalgia.

== Rhodesiana journal ==
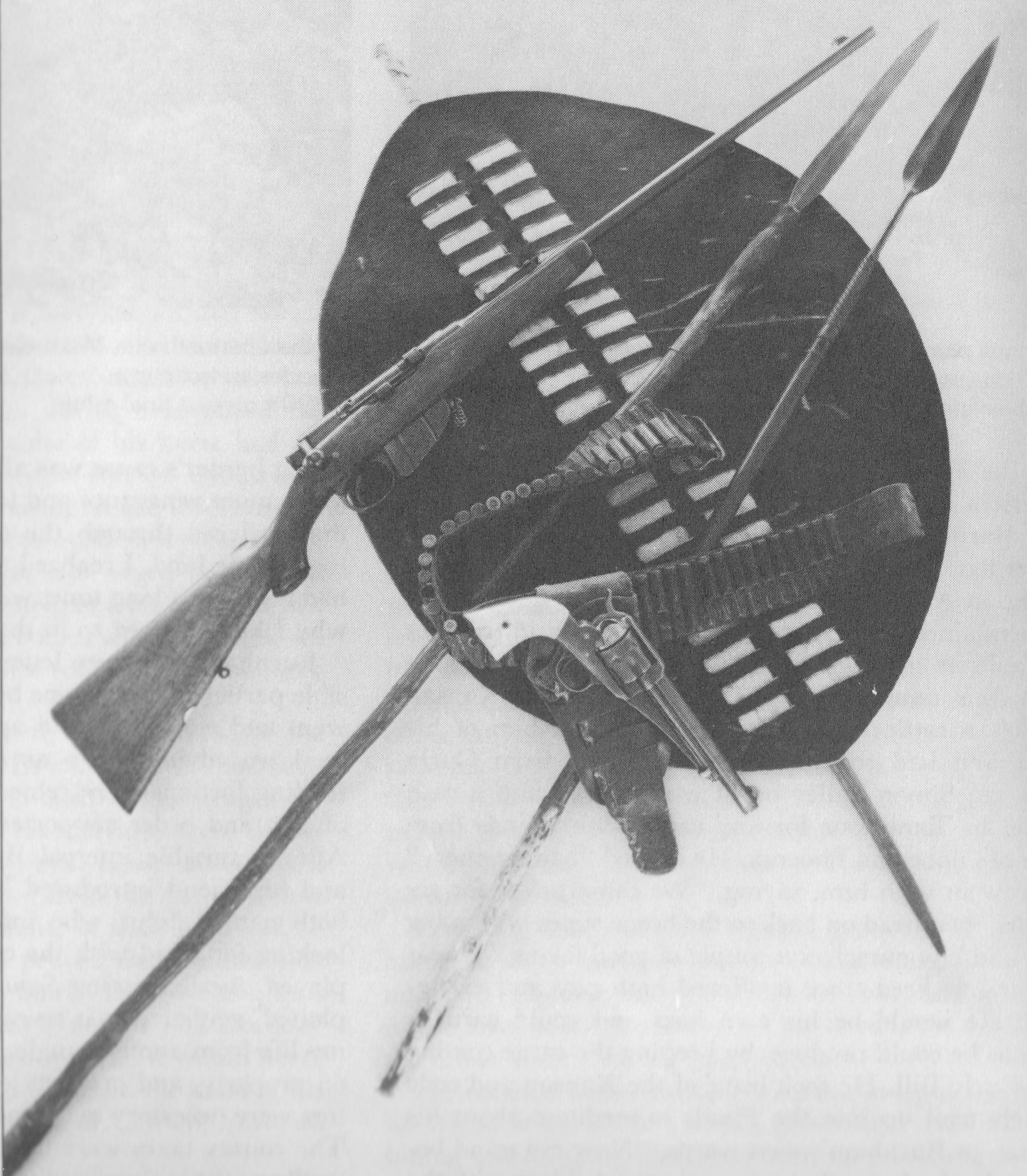
Rhodesiana exhibited at Bulawayo Museum, 1912. Weapons and bandoliers used by Frederick Russell Burnham during the Second Matabele War mingle with assegais and a tribal shield.

The Rhodesia Africana Society used the term as the title of its historical and cultural journal Rhodesiana, which was first published in 1956. It renamed itself The Rhodesiana Society in 1958, and published 40 issues of the Rhodesiana journal before ceasing its publication in 1979. After Rhodesia became Zimbabwe a year later, the society renamed itself the Historical Society of Zimbabwe, and began publishing Heritage (later Heritage of Zimbabwe), a similar journal to Rhodesiana, in 1981.

== Rhodesiana market ==
The term "Rhodesiana" may be used to describe the theme of a museum or collection, or to summarise the character of goods for sale. Indeed, a London-based dealer of African memorabilia, David Saffery, reported in 2002 that Rhodesiana was one of his best-selling lines, with the majority of customers being expatriates, "most of whom still describe themselves as Rhodesians". Particularly popular items included civil and military flags, banknotes of the Rhodesian pound and dollar, stamps, documents, and medals. Since 1980, Zimbabwean embassies and high commissions around the world have at various times raised money by selling off obsolete Rhodesian passports, documents, tableware, furniture and various curios. The Zimbabwean government itself entered the Rhodesiana market in 2002, when it sold off 9,000 unclaimed Rhodesian General Service Medals.

== See also ==
- Ethos
- Culture of Zimbabwe
- Americana – a similar concept in the United States
- Australiana – a similar concept in Australia
- Canadiana – a similar concept in Canada
- Kiwiana – a similar concept in New Zealand
- Yugo-nostalgia - a similar concept in the former Yugoslav states
