= Chomolia =

Vegetable

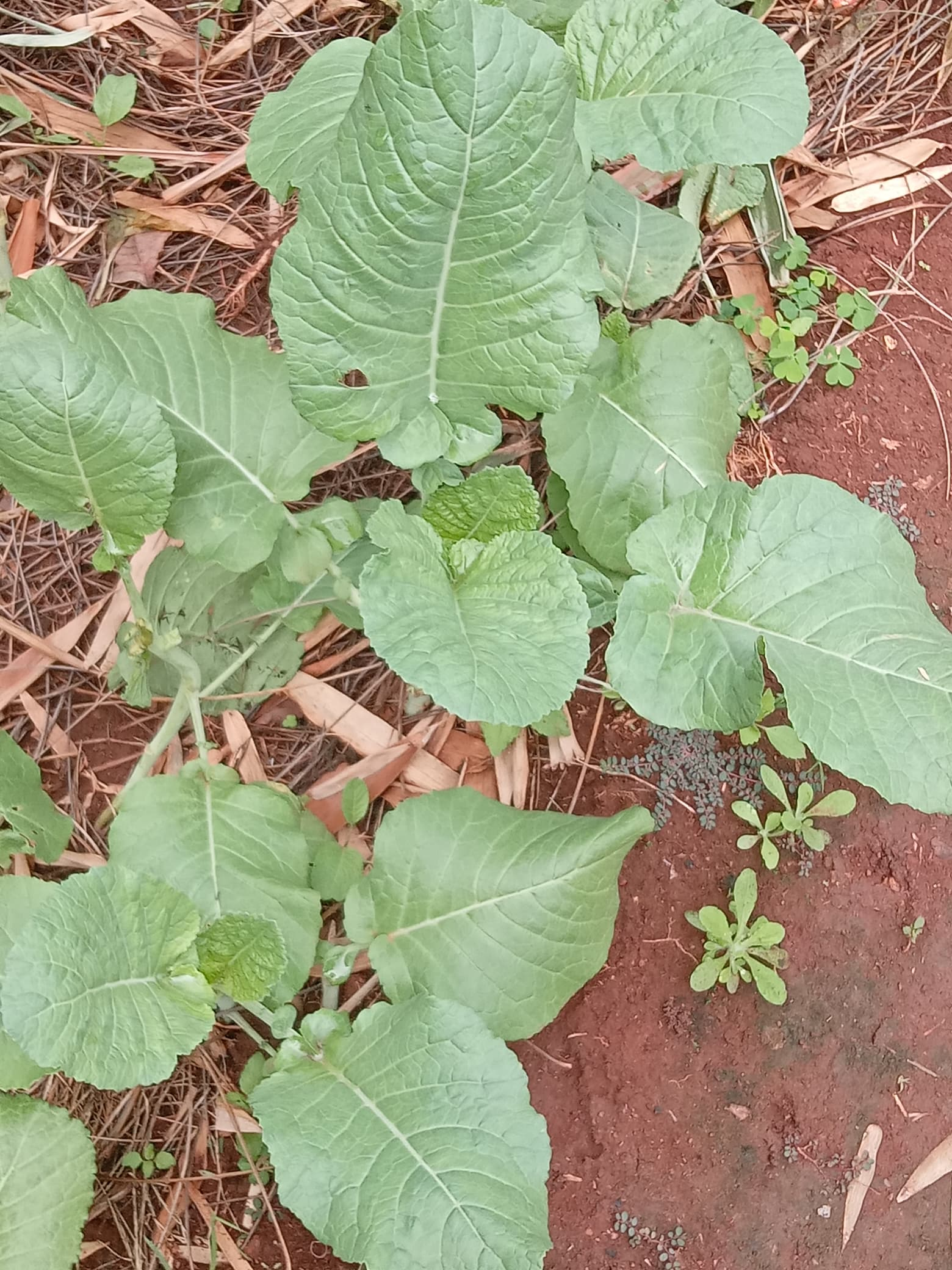
Chomolia in Zimbabwe

Chomolia or chou moellier is a vegetable widely farmed in Zimbabwe and Zambia. It is usually prepared as a relish for maize meal (Sadza in Shona and lsitshwala in Ndebele), Nshima in Zambia). Chomolia is green in colour and households grow it in their domestic gardens, watering them at least once a week during the dry season, though little additional watering is necessary in the rainy season. It can also be farmed on a large scale and resold at market.

Chomolia can be prepared in a similar manner to cabbage, though it usually takes less than ten minutes to prepare. It is probably the most consumed relish in Zimbabwe.
