= Reps Theatre =

Zimbabwean theatre and theatrical company based in Harare

Front view of Reps Theatre

Reps Theatre (also known as The Repertory Players or simply Reps) is a Zimbabwe theatre and theatrical company based in the capital city of Harare. It is one of Zimbabwe's oldest amateur theatrical companies. The first performance (February 1931) comprised two works – "Fame and the Poet" (Lord Dunsany) and "Magic" (G K Chesterton). The society mostly performs European or American Theatre.

The Repertory Players is an amateur society operating with paid staff – a theatre manager, secretary, book-keeper, workshop, security, bar and cleaning staff. But all actors, actresses and technical personnel are unpaid volunteers.

In 1960, it became involved in a legal dispute because of its non-racial policies. This incident was nicknamed as "The Battle of the Toilets" (see below).

== Early history ==
The company was formed as a 'play-reading group' with four members. Then, in February 1931, the group started doing performances in the Duthie Hall. Over the next five years, numerous productions were performed under difficult conditions. In 1936, they were offered the Prince Edward School Beit Hall. The stage was better equipped, and patrons could hire out a cushion for 3d each. The society would perform 38 plays over the next 11 years, but in 1947, their tenancy was terminated as the hall was needed for school functions.

The society was given accommodation in a ramshackle old hall, in the show grounds. The hall had been built as a cinema in World War II. The hall was renovated and reopened in September 1947 as the 'Belveder Theatre'. The theatre held 240 people and proved to be very popular, mainly because of the improved standard of play presentation. Over the next 12 years, 74 plays were performed.

== The New Theatre ==
Two men who had a profound impact on the fortunes of Reps, were Adrian Stanley and George Barnes. In 1952, Reps celebrated its 21st birthday and plans to build a new theatre were taking shape. George Barnes suggested that a Theatre foundation membership scheme should be launched. The idea was that 500 people would each contribute 50 pounds to the building of the new theatre. By 1957, the Society had raised the 25,000 pounds and construction began.

The new Reps Theatre was opened in September 1960 with a gala production of Romanov and Juliet. This included a fanfare of trumpets from the BSAP band, incidental music from a section of the municipal orchestra, corsages for every lady in the audience, a formal opening ceremony by the Governor General of the Federation, Lord Dalhousie, and after the show a champagne party in the foyer for the entire audience.

In 1964, Adrian was appointed as the theatre's first paid director, wasting no time in getting the Theatre out of the financial doldrums; Adrian Stanley produced shows up until his recent death, and has literally hundreds of shows to his name.

Noel McDonald, another producer of note, gave much of his time to REPS theatre. He inspired many young people to tread the boards and produced pantomimes, adult and children's shows. His wife Mary produced numerous costumes for the shows and, despite sanctions, always managed to come up trumps.

== "The Battle of the Toilets" ==
"The Battle of the Toilets" is the nickname for a saga that started when the committee decided to hold a secret ballot to determine whether the new theatre, which was due to open in a few months, should be open to all races. An overwhelming majority voted in favour of the non-racial policy and the Reps Committee agreed.

The only problem was that the new theatre only had toilets for men and women, and there were immediate objections from the Salisbury Public Works Committee. They pointed to Section 142 of the Building By-Laws which stated that "Europeans are prohibited from using the same sanitary conveniences as Asiatics, Natives and/or Coloured people, and Asiatics, Natives and/or Coloured people are prohibited from using the same sanitary conveniences as Europeans".

On 17 June 1959, the Committee told Reps that, unless separate conveniences were provided, then they would not receive a Public building Certificate and the theatre would not open. The society was in a dilemma: the new toilets would be very expensive and would delay opening. There was also legal doubt about the validity of the by-law, and a debate on the issue of 'Public Conveniences' was shortly to be held in parliament. Also, this law was ignored in many other public buildings in Salisbury.

The City Council, however, pressed the issue and, on 14 December 1959, insisted to Reps that there should not only be separate toilets, but a separate lobby and entrance. With one month until the official opening, on 13 January 1960, the Reps Committee moved to avoid a confrontation and the opening was restricted to Europeans.

Once the opening was behind them and encouraged by hints that the Public Works Committee was divided on the issue, Reps decided to stand firm. The chairman, Ken Towsey, wrote letters to the Mayor of Salisbury and Councillor J. J. Posselt, stressing the doubts on the Law's validity.

The Public Works Committee did not stand down and on 29 March 1960, the Council sought an interdict against Reps. This brought the confrontation to the fore: the Society had 30 days until the motion would be debated on the committee.

Reps sought the advice of Advocate Macaulay, Q.C. His opinion, which demolished the arguments of the Public Work Committee, was a model of precise argument. The report was about seven pages, and covered every aspect of the issue. It was said to read like an extract from Gilbert and Sullivan, as the following passage shows:

"Even if the council had the power .. to regulate the use of sanitary conveniences, the Bye-Law would still be bad in law and void for vagueness and uncertainty and unreasonableness. It prohibits the use of one race of conveniences used by another race. How can any member of the public know whether the convenience has been used, at some time, by a member of another race? Once so used the convenience becomes incapable in law of being used by the race it was intended to serve! One illegal use by a member of the wrong race would thus render it incapable in law of being used by any race at all, thus removing it altogether from the awkward problem of human relations."

On 8 April, the report was privately conveyed to the Mayor, who advised them to quietly carry on with its current policy. A few days later, the motion for an interdict was defeated. The 'Battle' was over.

== 1965 to present ==
In 1965, Prime minister Ian Smith declared Rhodesia's independence from Britain. This action, surprisingly, had no adverse effect on Reps' earnings for that year.

However, in the following years of Smith's rule, the sanctions against the country meant that obtaining the rights to perform became increasingly difficult. Many overseas companies felt that if they granted rights to Reps, they would be seen as somehow endorsing Smith's policies.

Adrian Stanley negotiated many of these contracts, and managed to obtain rights to several new productions – such as Godspell and Jesus Christ Superstar. These two shows would become the most popular shows in Zimbabwe's history.

The Lancaster House Agreement and the forming of Zimbabwe, also didn't have much effect on the Theatre, apart from the easing of sanctions, etc. The only notable incident was when the independence celebrations were held, many visiting diplomats booked tickets for the Reps Theatre and hardly any showed up.

== Today ==
Since its founding, the theatre has produced over 725 of its own shows.

It has had to grapple with

- high costs of production
- members leaving for overseas
- the difficulty of effective advertising
- the difficulty of replacing and updating light fitting/bulbs and curtains
- high costs of rights to perform shows with a dwindling income from reduced audiences.
- a 'culture of fear' that restricts what can be said about the government

However, the theatre still manages to produce about six or seven plays per year and has absolutely no plans of slowing down.

The theater has always been a cultural melting pot for Zimbabweans and visitors alike, and a number of Reps members have gone on to find fame and fortune abroad.

== Repteens ==
Repteens was founded in August 1960 as the 'young people's company' at Reps Theatre. Repteens was given the objective of training young people in the Art of Theatre. It is open to people aged between 13 and 19 years and is run by an experienced theatre director/teacher. Its members are often recruited for use in Reps' major productions and the company will occasionally put on its own productions.

Many former members of Repteens have pursued a career in theatre – the most notable is the famed Over the Edge Company, which has won great recognition and awards for its productions in London and Edinburgh.

== Sources ==
- The Story of Reps by Robert Cary (Galaxie press, 1974)
