= List of awards and nominations received by Lily Gladstone =

Lily Gladstone awards and nominations
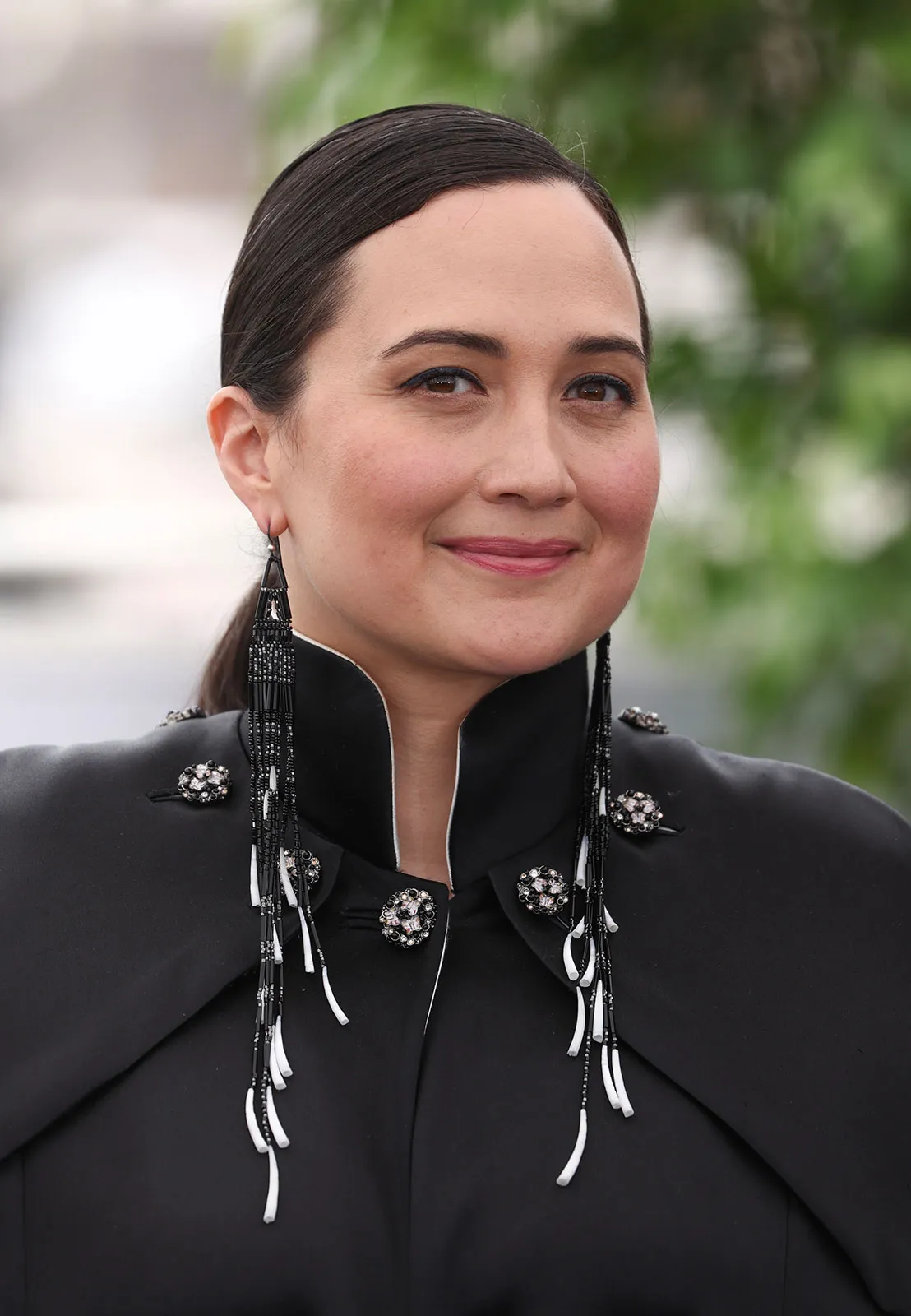
- Gladstone at the 2023 Cannes Film Festival
Awards and nominations
Award	Wins	Nominations
Academy Awards	0	1
Actor Awards	1	3
Critics' Choice Awards	0	2
Emmy Awards	0	1
Golden Globe Awards	1	1

Totals (Note: Certain award groups do not simply award one winner. They acknowledge several different recipients, have runners-up, and have third place. Since this is a specific recognition and is different from losing an award, runner-up mentions are considered wins in this award tally. For simplification and to avoid errors, each award in this list has been presumed to have had a prior nomination.)
- Wins: 59
- Nominations: 103

The following is a list of awards and nominations received by American actress Lily Gladstone.

She (Note: Gladstone uses both she/her and they/them pronouns; this article uses she/her pronouns for consistency.) gained recognition for her performance as a lonely rancher in Kelly Reichardt's Certain Women (2016), including a nomination for the Independent Spirit Award for Best Supporting Female. In 2023, she garnered critical acclaim for her portrayal of Mollie Burkhart in Martin Scorsese's crime epic Killers of the Flower Moon, for which she received numerous awards and nominations, including a nomination for the Academy Award for Best Actress and becoming the first Native Actress of American descent to be nominated for an Oscar in 2024. The role also earned her both the Golden Globe Award for Best Actress in a Motion Picture – Drama and Actor Award for Outstanding Performance by a Female Actor in a Leading Role.

Also in 2024, she (alongside Kali Reis) became one of two Indigenous women ever to be nominated for an acting category at the 76th Primetime Emmy Awards for their work in television. Gladstone was nominated for Outstanding Supporting Actress in a Limited or Anthology Series or Movie for her role as Officer Cam Bentland in the Hulu miniseries Under the Bridge (2024).

== Major associations ==
=== Academy Awards ===
Year	Category	Work	Result	Ref.
2024	Best Actress	Killers of the Flower Moon	Nominated	

=== Actor Awards ===
Year	Category	Work	Result	Ref.
2024	Outstanding Cast in a Motion Picture	Killers of the Flower Moon	Nominated (Note: Shared with the cast.)	
2024	Outstanding Female Actor in a Leading Role	Killers of the Flower Moon	Won	
2025	Outstanding Female Actor in a Miniseries or Television Movie	Under the Bridge	Nominated	

=== Critics' Choice Awards ===
Year	Category	Work	Result	Ref.
Film
2024	Best Actress	Killers of the Flower Moon	Nominated	
2024	Best Acting Ensemble	Killers of the Flower Moon	Nominated	

=== Emmy Awards ===
Year	Category	Work	Result	Ref.
Primetime Emmy Awards
2024	Outstanding Supporting Actress in a Limited or Anthology Series or Movie	Under the Bridge	Nominated	

=== Golden Globe Awards ===
Year	Category	Work	Result	Ref.
2024	Best Actress in a Motion Picture – Drama	Killers of the Flower Moon	Won	

== Other awards ==
=== Gotham Awards ===
Year	Category	Work	Result	Ref.
Film
2016	Breakthrough Performer	Certain Women	Nominated	
2023	Outstanding Lead Performance	The Unknown Country	Won	
Television
2024	Outstanding Performance in a Limited Series	Under the Bridge	Nominated	

=== Independent Spirit Awards ===
Year	Category	Work	Result	Ref.
2016	Best Supporting Female	Certain Women	Nominated	
2024	John Cassavetes Award	The Unknown Country	Nominated (Note: Shared with Katherine Harper, Laura Heberton, Tommy Heitkamp, Morrisa Maltz, Lainey Bearkiller Shangreaux, and Vanara Taing.)	
2025	Best Lead Performance in a New Scripted Series	Under the Bridge	Nominated	

=== Irish Film & Television Awards ===
Year	Category	Work	Result	Ref.
2024	Best International Actress	Killers of the Flower Moon	Nominated	

=== National Board of Review ===
Year	Category	Work	Result	Ref.
2023	Best Actress	Killers of the Flower Moon	Won	

=== Satellite Awards ===
Year	Category	Work	Result	Ref.
2024	Best Actress in a Motion Picture – Drama	Killers of the Flower Moon	Won	

== Other associations ==
Year	Association	Category	Project	Result	Ref.
2016	Boston Society of Film Critics Awards	Best Supporting Actress	Certain Women	Won	
2016	Boston Society of Film Critics Awards	Best Ensemble Cast	Certain Women	Nominated	
2016	Chicago Film Critics Association Awards	Best Supporting Actress	Certain Women	Nominated	
2016	Chicago Film Critics Association Awards	Most Promising Performer	Certain Women	Nominated	
2016	Florida Film Critics Circle Awards	Best Supporting Actress	Certain Women	Nominated	
2016	Georgia Film Critics Association	Breakthrough Award	Certain Women; Buster's Mal Heart	Nominated	
2016	Indiana Film Journalists Association	Best Supporting Actress	Certain Women	Nominated	
2016	IndieWire Critics Poll	Best Supporting Actress	Certain Women	Won	
2016	Los Angeles Film Critics Association Awards	Best Supporting Actress	Certain Women	Won	
2016	Online Film Critics Society	Best Supporting Actress	Certain Women	Nominated	
2016	San Diego Film Critics Society	Best Supporting Actress	Certain Women	Nominated	
2016	San Diego Film Critics Society	Breakthrough Artist	Certain Women	Won	
2016	San Francisco Bay Area Film Critics Circle	Best Supporting Actress	Certain Women	Nominated	
2016	Seattle Film Critics Society	Best Supporting Actress	Certain Women	Runner-up (Note: Tied with Naomie Harris for Moonlight.)	
2016	St. Louis Film Critics Association	Best Supporting Actress	Certain Women	Nominated	
2016	Village Voice Film Poll	Best Supporting Actress	Certain Women	Won	
2016	Women Film Critics Circle	Best Invisible Woman	Certain Women	Nominated	
2016	Women Film Critics Circle	Courage in Acting Award	Certain Women	Nominated	
2017	Central Ohio Film Critics Association	Best Supporting Actress	Certain Women	Won	
2017	Chlotrudis Society for Independent Films	Best Supporting Actress	Certain Women	Won	
2017	International Cinephile Society	Best Supporting Actress	Certain Women	Won	
2017	London Film Critics' Circle	Supporting Actress of the Year	Certain Women	Nominated	
2017	National Society of Film Critics	Best Supporting Actress	Certain Women	2nd place	
2017	Online Film & Television Association	Best Breakthrough Performance: Female	Certain Women	Nominated	
2023	Atlanta Film Critics Circle	Best Actress	Killers of the Flower Moon	Won	
2023	Atlanta Film Critics Circle	Best Breakthrough Performer	Killers of the Flower Moon	Won	
2023	Boston Online Film Critics Association	Best Actress	Killers of the Flower Moon	Won	
2023	Boston Society of Film Critics	Best Actress	Killers of the Flower Moon	Won	
2023	Chicago Film Critics Association	Best Actress	Killers of the Flower Moon	Nominated	
2023	Dallas–Fort Worth Film Critics Association	Best Actress	Killers of the Flower Moon	Won	
2023	Dublin Film Critics' Circle	Best Actress	Killers of the Flower Moon	Won	
2023	Florida Film Critics Circle	Best Actress	Killers of the Flower Moon	Won	
2023	IndieWire Critics Poll	Best Performance	Killers of the Flower Moon	2nd place	
2023	Los Angeles Film Critics Association	Best Supporting Performance	Killers of the Flower Moon	Runner-up (Note: Shared with Ryan Gosling for Barbie.)	
2023	Michigan Movie Critics Guild	Best Actress	Killers of the Flower Moon	Nominated	
2023	New York Film Critics Circle	Best Actress	Killers of the Flower Moon	Won	
2023	North Texas Film Critics Association	Best Actress	Killers of the Flower Moon	Won	
2023	Online Association of Female Film Critics	Best Actress	Killers of the Flower Moon	Won	
2023	Philadelphia Film Critics Circle	Best Actress	Killers of the Flower Moon	Runner-up	
2023	Phoenix Critics Circle	Best Actress	Killers of the Flower Moon	Nominated	
2023	San Diego Film Critics Society	Best Actress	Killers of the Flower Moon	Won	
2023	Southern Eastern Film Critics Association	Best Actress	Killers of the Flower Moon	Won	
2023	St. Louis Film Critics Association	Best Actress	Killers of the Flower Moon	Won	
2023	Toronto Film Critics Association	Outstanding Lead Performance	Killers of the Flower Moon	Won (Note: Shared with Sandra Hüller for Anatomy of a Fall.)	
2023	UK Film Critics Association	Best Actress	Killers of the Flower Moon	Won	
2023	Variety's Power of Women	Honoree	Killers of the Flower Moon	Honored	
2023	Washington D.C. Area Film Critics Association	Best Actress	Killers of the Flower Moon	Won	
2024	AACTA International Awards	Best Actress	Killers of the Flower Moon	Nominated	
2024	Alliance of Women Film Journalists	Best Actress	Killers of the Flower Moon	Won	
2024	Astra Film Awards	Best Actress	Killers of the Flower Moon	Won (Note: Tied with Margot Robbie for Barbie.)	
2024	Astra TV Awards	Best Supporting Actress in a Limited Series or TV Movie	Under the Bridge	Won	
2024	Austin Film Critics Association	Best Actress	Killers of the Flower Moon	Won	
2024	Capri Hollywood International Film Festival	Best Actress	Killers of the Flower Moon	Won	
2024	Chicago Indie Critics	Best Actress	Killers of the Flower Moon	Nominated	
2024	Columbus Film Critics Association	Best Lead Performance	Killers of the Flower Moon	Nominated	
2024	Critics Association of Central Florida	Best Actress	Killers of the Flower Moon	Runner-up	
2024	Denver Film Critics Society	Best Actress	Killers of the Flower Moon	Nominated	
2024	DiscussingFilm Critic Awards	Best Actress	Killers of the Flower Moon	Won	
2024	Dorian Awards	Film Performance of the Year	Killers of the Flower Moon	Won	
2024	Dorian Awards	"We're Wilde About You!" Rising Star	—N/a	Nominated	
2024	Dorian Awards	Wilde Artist Award	—N/a	Nominated	
2024	Dorian Awards	Best TV Performance—Drama	Under the Bridge	Nominated	
2024	Georgia Film Critics Association	Best Actress	Killers of the Flower Moon	Won	
2024	Greater Western New York Film Critics Association	Best Actress	Killers of the Flower Moon	Won	
2024	Hawaii Film Critics Society	Best Actress	Killers of the Flower Moon	Nominated	
2024	Houston Film Critics Society	Best Actress	Killers of the Flower Moon	Nominated	
2024	International Cinephile Society	Best Actress	Killers of the Flower Moon	Nominated	
2024	Iowa Film Critics Association	Best Actress	Killers of the Flower Moon	Won (Note: Tied with Emma Stone for Poor Things.)	
2024	Kansas City Film Critics Circle	Best Actress	Killers of the Flower Moon	Won	
2024	Latino Entertainment Journalists Association	Best Actress	Killers of the Flower Moon	Won	
2024	London Film Critics' Circle	Actress of the Year	Killers of the Flower Moon	Nominated	
2024	Minnesota Film Critics Alliance	Best Actress	Killers of the Flower Moon	Won	
2024	Music City Film Critics Association	Best Actress	Killers of the Flower Moon	Nominated	
2024	National Society of Film Critics	Best Actress	Killers of the Flower Moon	3rd place	
2024	North Carolina Film Critics Association	Best Actress	Killers of the Flower Moon	Won	
2024	North Dakota Film Society	Best Actress	Killers of the Flower Moon	Won	
2024	Oklahoma Film Critics Circle	Best Actress	Killers of the Flower Moon	Won	
2024	Online Film Critics Society	Best Actress	Killers of the Flower Moon	Won	
2024	Online Film & Television Association	Best Actress	Killers of the Flower Moon	Runner-up	
2024	Online Film & Television Association	Best Breakthrough Performance: Female	Killers of the Flower Moon	Won	
2024	Palm Springs International Film Festival	Vanguard Award	Killers of the Flower Moon	Honored (Note: Shared with the cast and crew.)	
2024	Paris Film Critics Association Awards	Best Actress	Killers of the Flower Moon	Nominated	
2024	Portland Critics Association	Best Actress	Killers of the Flower Moon	Nominated	
2024	San Francisco Bay Area Film Critics Circle	Best Actress	Killers of the Flower Moon	Nominated	
2024	Santa Barbara International Film Festival	Virtuoso Award	Killers of the Flower Moon	Won	
2024	Seattle Film Critics Society	Lead Actress	Killers of the Flower Moon	Won	
2024	Seattle Film Critics Society	Inaugural Award	Killers of the Flower Moon	Honored	
2024	Utah Film Critics Association	Best Actress	Killers of the Flower Moon	Runner-up (Note: Tied with Greta Lee for Past Lives.)	
