= Red Crow Mountain =

Mountain in the state of Montana

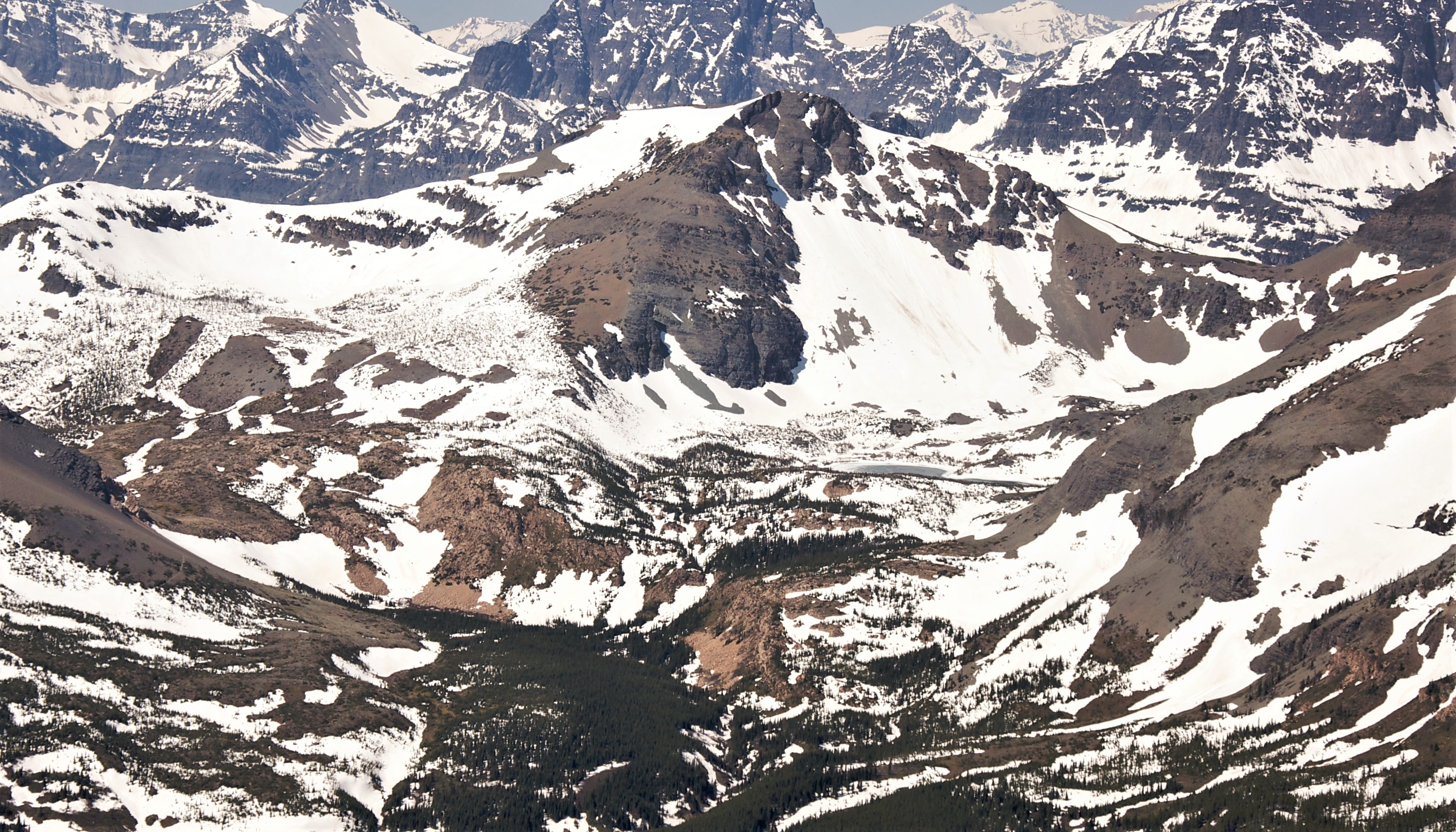
- Aerial view, east aspect

Highest point
- Elevation: 7,891 ft (2,405 m)
- Prominence: 771 ft (235 m)
- Parent peak: Calf Robe Mountain (7,948 ft)
- Isolation: 1.20 mi (1.93 km)
- Coordinates: 48°24′04″N 113°20′55″W

Naming
- Etymology: Red Crow

Geography
- Location within Montana Location within the United States
- Location: Glacier National Park; Flathead County / Glacier County; Montana, U.S.
- Parent range: Lewis Range; Rocky Mountains
- Topo map: USGS Dancing Lady Mountain

Climbing
- Easiest route: class 2

Red Crow Mountain is a 7,891-foot-elevation (2,405-meter) mountain summit located in Glacier National Park in the U.S. state of Montana. The summit is set on the border shared by Flathead County and Glacier County. It is situated on the Continental Divide so precipitation runoff from the east side of the mountain drains into Railroad Creek which is part of the Two Medicine River watershed, and the west side drains to Ole Creek, which is a tributary of Middle Fork Flathead River. It is set in the Lewis Range, 6.5 miles southwest of East Glacier Park Village. Topographic relief is significant as the east aspect rises approximately 2,000 feet (610 meters) in one mile. The nearest higher neighbor is Calf Robe Mountain 1.2 mile to the southeast, with Firebrand Pass forming the saddle between these two peaks.

== Etymology ==
The mountain's name commemorates Red Crow (1830–1900), leader of the Kainai. The toponym was officially adopted in 1911 by the United States Board on Geographic Names.

== Geology ==
Like other mountains in Glacier National Park, Red Crow Mountain is composed of sedimentary rock laid down during the Precambrian to Jurassic periods. Formed in shallow seas, this sedimentary rock was initially uplifted beginning 170 million years ago when the Lewis Overthrust fault pushed an enormous slab of precambrian rocks 3 mi (4.8 km) thick, 50 miles (80 km) wide and 160 miles (260 km) long over younger rock of the cretaceous period.

== Climate ==
According to the Köppen climate classification system, Red Crow Mountain is located in an alpine subarctic climate zone with long, cold, snowy winters, and cool to warm summers. Winter temperatures can drop below −10 °F with wind chill factors below −30 °F. Due to its altitude, it receives precipitation all year, as snow in winter, and as thunderstorms in summer.

== See also ==
- Mountains and mountain ranges of Glacier National Park (U.S.)
- Geology of the Rocky Mountains
