= Lily Gladstone =

American actress (born 1986)

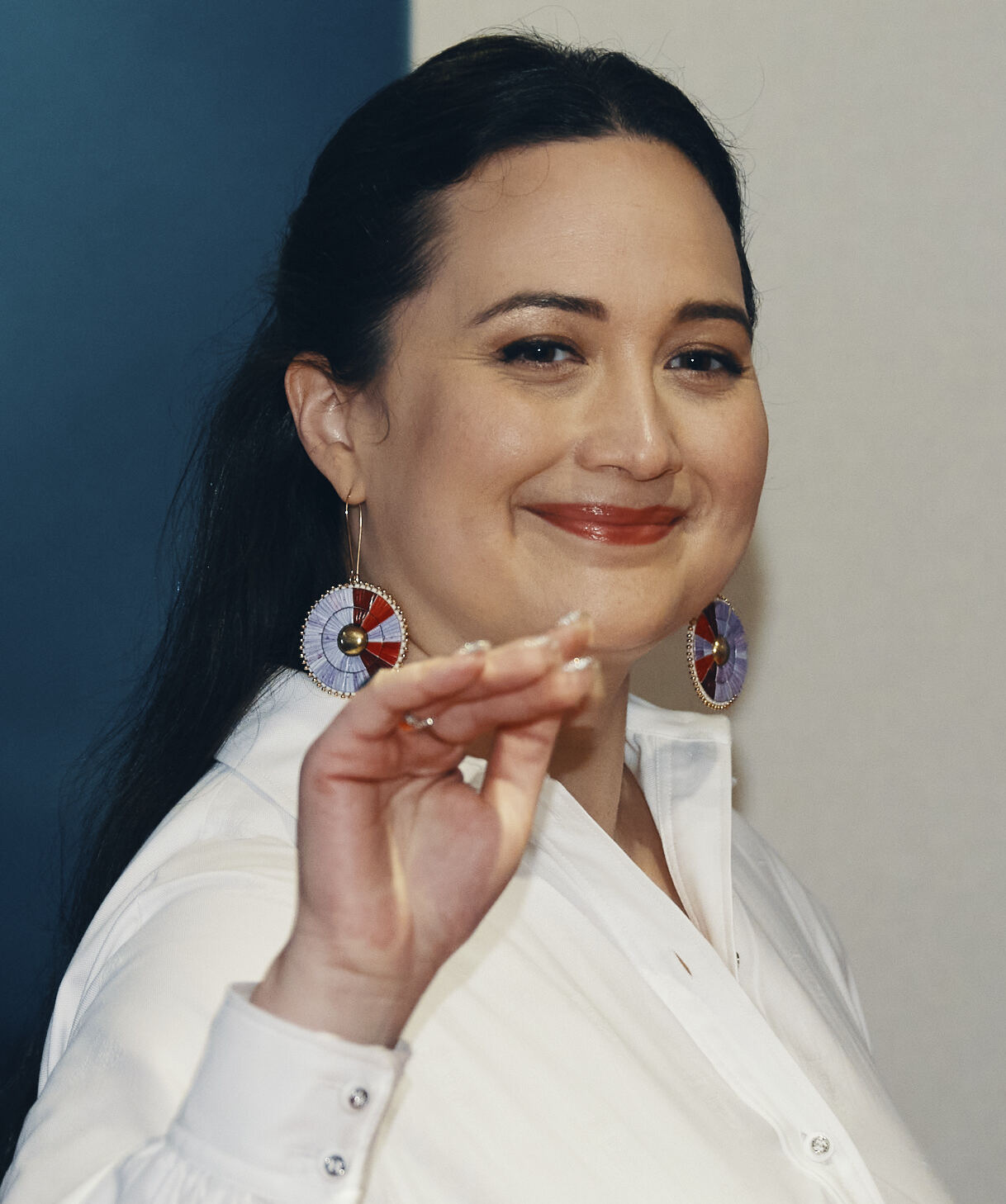
- Gladstone in 2024
- Born: August 2, 1986 (age 40); Kalispell, Montana, U.S.
- Education: University of Montana (BFA)
- Occupation: Actress
- Years active: 2012–present
- Relatives: Red Crow (great-great grandfather)
- Awards: Full list

Lily Catherine Gladstone (born August 2, 1986) is an American actress. Raised on the Blackfeet Reservation, Gladstone is of Piegan Blackfeet, Nez Perce, and European heritage. She (Note: Gladstone uses both she/her and they/them pronouns; this article uses she/her pronouns for consistency.) earned critical acclaim for portraying Mollie Kyle, an Osage woman who survived the Osage Indian murders, in Martin Scorsese's crime drama film Killers of the Flower Moon (2023), receiving several accolades; she became the first Native American to win the Golden Globe Award for Best Actress in a Motion Picture – Drama and be nominated for the Academy Award for Best Actress.

Gladstone made her feature film debut in Jimmy P: Psychotherapy of a Plains Indian (2012), and collaborated with filmmaker Kelly Reichardt on the independent films Certain Women (2016) and First Cow (2019). She also appeared in the television series Room 104 (2017–2020), Billions (2016–2023), and Reservation Dogs (2022–2023). Her performance in the crime drama miniseries Under the Bridge (2024) earned her a nomination for a Primetime Emmy Award.

== Early life and education ==
Gladstone was born on August 2, 1986, in Kalispell, Montana. Raised on the Blackfeet Reservation in Browning, Montana, she is of Piegan Blackfeet (Siksikaitsitapi) and Nez Perce (Nimíipuu) ancestry on her father's side, and European and Cajun heritage on her mother's side. She is descended from the first cousin of British Prime Minister William Ewart Gladstone. One of her paternal great-great-grandfathers was Kainai Nation chief Red Crow.

Gladstone's desire to portray an Ewok after watching Return of the Jedi at the age of five inspired her to become an actress. One of her first acting experiences as a child was when Missoula Children's Theatre came to her East Glacier, Montana, hometown and cast her as an evil step-sister in Cinderella. Gladstone's family moved to the Seattle area during her middle school years to be closer to her grandmother. There she enrolled in Stone Soup Theatre, a nonprofit educational theatre company for Seattle youth, starring in student films and theses.

In 2004 she graduated from Mountlake Terrace High School in Mountlake Terrace, Washington. In 2008 she graduated from the University of Montana with a Bachelor of Fine Arts (BFA) in Acting/Directing and a Native American Studies minor. At the University of Montana, she became interested in Theatre of the Oppressed. At UM, she performed in Riders to the Sea (2006), Richard III (2006), Miss Julie (2007) and Coyote on a Fence (2008). Upon graduating, she taught acting classes and workshops in her Native community. She taught an image theatre acting method she called a "sculpture garden" as violence prevention sponsored by the National Indigenous Women's Resource Center. In 2010, she performed in The Frybread Queen, a co-production by Native Voices at the Autry, the UM School of Theatre and Dance and the Montana Repertory Theatre.

== Career ==
=== Early work and breakthrough (2012–2022) ===
Gladstone made her film debut in Jimmy P: Psychotherapy of a Plains Indian (2012). She then acted in Winter in the Blood (2012) and Buster's Mal Heart (2016) before making her career breakthrough as Jamie, a rancher, in Kelly Reichardt's film Certain Women (2016). The role earned Gladstone the Los Angeles Film Critics Association Award for Best Supporting Actress and the Boston Society of Film Critics Award for Best Supporting Actress. She also received nominations for the Independent Spirit Award for Best Supporting Female and Gotham Independent Film Award for Breakthrough Actor.

Gladstone performed the role of Kate Keller in the 2014 Montana Repertory Theatre's national touring production of The Miracle Worker. Gladstone was in the Oregon Shakespeare Festival acting company in 2017 and starred in the Yale Repertory Theatre production of Mary Kathryn Nagle's Manahatta in 2020. In 2017, Gladstone hosted a series on the educational YouTube channel Crash Course about film production. Gladstone had a small role in Reichardt's 2019 film First Cow before starring in the 2022 film The Unknown Country, directed by Morrisa Maltz, for which she received the Gotham Independent Film Award for Outstanding Lead Performance.

=== Career progression (2023–present) ===
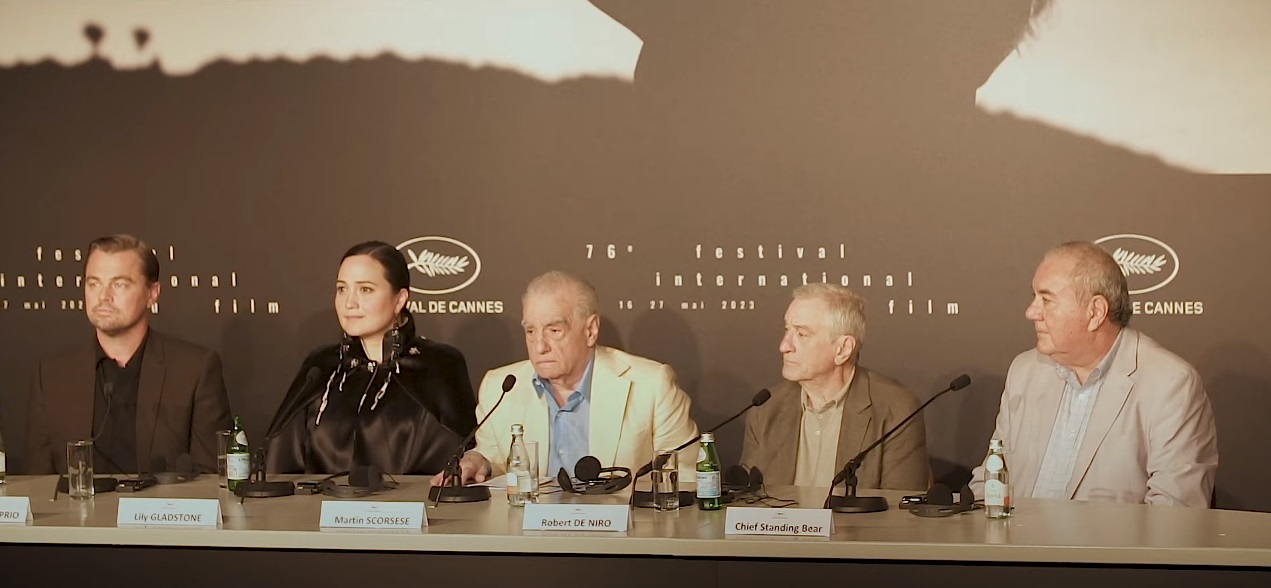
Gladstone at the 2023 Cannes Film Festival with Leonardo DiCaprio, Martin Scorsese, Robert De Niro, and Principal Chief Geoffrey Standing Bear

Gladstone was cast in the lead role of Mollie Kyle in Martin Scorsese's 2023 feature film Killers of the Flower Moon, which was released theatrically in October 2023. Her performance received critical acclaim and was described as a highlight of the film. Critic Josh Spiegel of /Film said that she "brought [Mollie] to life with incredible passion". In January 2024, she won the Golden Globe Award for Best Actress in a Motion Picture – Drama; she was the first Indigenous (Native American) person to win an acting Golden Globe. She also became the first Native American nominated for the Academy Award for Best Actress. In February 2024, she became the first Indigenous actor to win the Actor Award for Outstanding Performance by a Female Actor in a Leading Role.

Earlier in 2023, Gladstone starred in Fancy Dance which premiered at the 2023 Sundance Film Festival to critical acclaim and was distributed worldwide by Apple TV+. In 2024, Gladstone starred in the crime drama miniseries Under the Bridge, about the murder of Reena Virk. Her performance earned her a nomination for the Primetime Emmy Award for Outstanding Supporting Actress in a Limited or Anthology Series or Movie.

The Blackfeet Nation celebrated "Lily Gladstone Day" in her honor, on March 26, 2024. At the event, Gladstone was honored with the transfer of a stand-up headdress by The Women’s Stand-Up Headdress Society, a group of Blackfoot women who had been transferred the right to own headdresses.

Gladstone also costarred in Jazzy, written and directed by Maltz. Gladstone appeared in The Wedding Banquet, which began filming in May 2024. Also in May, Gladstone served as a member of the jury for the main competition at the 2024 Cannes Film Festival. In June 2024, Gladstone was invited to become a member of the Academy of Motion Picture Arts and Sciences. In October 2024, it was announced that Gladstone would join Sharon Stone in the comedy film, In Memoriam, which was released in 2026.

Gladstone is a signatory of the Film Workers for Palestine boycott pledge that was published in September 2025.

== Personal life ==
Gladstone goes by both "she" and "they" pronouns. She explained in 2023, "In most Native languages, most Indigenous languages, Blackfeet included, there are no gendered pronouns. There is no he/she, there's only they... my pronoun use is partly a way of decolonizing gender for myself." Gladstone is "middle-gendered" and a member of the LGBTQ community.

Gladstone stated in 2025 that she "can’t put a label on" her sexual orientation; she has referred to herself as queer, pansexual, straight, and demisexual.

== Filmography ==
=== Film ===
Year	Title	Role	Notes
2012	Jimmy P: Psychotherapy of a Plains Indian	Sunshine First Raise	
2013	Winter in the Blood	Marlene	
2015	Subterranea	Heather	
2016	Certain Women	Rancher	
2016	Buster's Mal Heart	Morning Shift Concierge	
2017	Walking Out	Lila	
2019	First Cow	Chief Factor's Wife	
2020	Two Eyes	Enola	
2021	Freeland	Mara	
2022	The Unknown Country	Tana	Also story writer
2022	Quantum Cowboys	Linde	
2022	The Last Manhunt	Maria	
2023	Fancy Dance	Jax	Also executive producer
2023	Killers of the Flower Moon	Mollie Kyle	
2024	Bring Them Home	Narrator	Also executive producer
2024	Jazzy	Tana	Also executive producer
2025	The Wedding Banquet	Lee	
2026	In Memoriam	Samantha	
2027	The Thomas Crown Affair †	TBA	Post-production
TBA	Lone Wolf †	TBA	Post-production

=== Television ===
Year	Title	Role	Notes
2017	Scalped	Carol Red Crow	Pilot
2017	Crash Course	Host	15 episodes
2017–2020	Room 104	911 Operator / Abby	2 episodes
2019–2023	Billions	Roxanne	6 episodes
2021	Tuca & Bertie	Hawk Mechanic (voice)	Episode: "Bird Mechanics"
2022–2023	Reservation Dogs	Hokti	2 episodes
2024	Under the Bridge	Cam Bentland	8 episodes

=== Stage ===
Year	Title	Role	Notes
2017	Off the Rails	Isabel	Oregon Shakespeare Festival
2018	Good for Otto	Denise	The New Group, Off-Broadway
2020	Manahatta	Jane Snake	Yale Repertory Theatre

== See also ==
- List of actors with Academy Award nominations
- List of actors nominated for Academy Awards for non-English performances
- List of Indigenous Academy Award winners and nominees
- List of LGBTQ Academy Award winners and nominees — Confirmed individuals for Best Lead Actress
- List of Golden Globe winners
