= Rebecca Godfrey =

Canadian writer (1967–2022)

- Born: 2 December 1967; Toronto, Ontario, Canada
- Died: 3 October 2022 (aged 54); New York City, New York, U.S.
- Education: University of Toronto; Sarah Lawrence College
- Occupation: Writer
- Spouse: Herbert Wilson
- Children: 1
- Father: Dave Godfrey

Rebecca Margot Godfrey (December 2, 1967 – October 3, 2022) was a Canadian novelist and non-fiction writer.

== Early life ==
Godfrey was born in Toronto, Ontario, to writers Dave Godfrey and Ellen Godfrey. As a child she relocated with her family to Victoria, British Columbia. Godfrey attended the University of Toronto and Sarah Lawrence College, from which she received an MFA in creative writing.

== Career ==
Godfrey worked in Toronto and New York as a journalist and editor before she began writing books. Her first novel, The Torn Skirt (2001) was shortlisted for the 2002 Ethel Wilson Fiction Prize. Described as a feminine alternative to the works of David Foster Wallace, it received a favorable review in the New York Times.

Rebecca's second book, Under the Bridge (2005), an investigation into the beating death of Reena Virk, received British Columbia's National Award for Canadian Non-Fiction in 2006. It was optioned for film adaptation by Reese Witherspoon's Type A Productions. In 2017 Godfrey wrote a follow-up to her book with an update on the legal fate of the two convicted killers and the lives of the girls involved in the crime for Vice magazine. The book was also included in Rolling Stone's 2017 list of 11 True Crime Books for Music Lovers and Men's Journal's list of the 10 Best True Crime Books. On June 25, 2019, Gallery Books published a new edition of Under the Bridge with an introduction by Godfrey's friend Mary Gaitskill.

Godfrey subsequently continued to write portraits of unconventional, influential women, including an interview of Robyn Doolittle on her 2014 exposé of Toronto mayor Rob Ford's tumultuous political career and interviewing German actress Barbara Sukowa on the legacy of Hannah Arendt.

In August 2016 Godfrey curated a gallery show at the Instar Lodge in Germantown, New York, titled Girls in Trees. The show featured works by over 33 artists and writers, including the photographer Brigitte Lacombe, the poet Sharon Olds, the novelists Mary Gaitskill and Samantha Hunt, poet Nick Flynn, and sculptor Julianne Swartz. The accompanying publication includes photographs, text, and other artistic materials offering a variety of perspectives on the theme of girlhood and nature.

In 2016, Godfrey was awarded a Fellowship from the MacDowell Colony, where she worked on her third book, a novel then titled The Dilettante. The novel explores the early life of Peggy Guggenheim, her first gallery, and a brief, unlikely affair with Samuel Beckett. Godfrey had previously worked on the novel during a period as a visiting artist at the American Academy in Rome.

Godfrey was an adjunct assistant professor of creative writing at Columbia University, where she taught fiction workshops and a seminar on Anti-Heroines in literature. Former students who have published works influenced by the themes of the seminar include Mandy Berman and Naima Coster.

A week before her death, Hulu announced it had ordered an eight-episode true-crime limited series, Under the Bridge, based on Godfrey's book of the same name. Credited as one of the executive producers, Godfrey had collaborated with Quinn Shepard for two and a half years to adapt the book for the screen. Production began in December 2022. The series, Under the Bridge, premiered on 17 April 2024, with Riley Keough portraying Godfrey.

Her final novel, Peggy, was published posthumously by Random House in August 2024. It was completed from Godfrey's notes after her death by her friend and colleague Leslie Jamison.

== Personal life and death ==
Godfrey married Herbert Wilson, and they had one child together, daughter Ada. Godfrey died from complications of lung cancer in New York City on October 3, 2022, at the age of 54.

== In popular media ==
- The Torn Skirt established a cult following with fans including Thurston Moore and Mary Gaitskill and made an appearance on Season 3 of Gossip Girl.
- Under the Bridge received a mention in a 2006 interview with Peter Dinklage.
- In an interview with Laura Lippman, the novelist Megan Abbott, show runner and writer of the USA Network series Dare Me, cites Under the Bridge as inspiration and part of a movement of contemporary "dark female fiction."

== Bibliography ==
- — (2001). The Torn Skirt. Toronto: HarperFlamingo. ISBN 978-0-00-225519-6. OCLC 46991039.
- — (2005). Under the Bridge: The True Story of the Murder of Reena Virk. Toronto: HarperCollins Publishers. ISBN 978-0-00-200067-3. OCLC 58830378.
- — (2024). Peggy: A Novel. Random House. ISBN 978-0-38-553828-2.
