= List of Indigenous Academy Award winners and nominees =

This is a list of Indigenous people who have won or been nominated for Academy Awards. It includes those of provable Indigenous descent regardless of whether they passed as white at the time of their nomination, such as Merle Oberon.

== Best Picture ==
Year (Ceremony)	Name	Country	Ethnic group(s)	Film	Status	Milestone / Notes	Ref.
2019 (92nd)	Taika Waititi; Chelsea Winstanley	(New Zealand)	Māori	Jojo Rabbit	Nominated	Winstanley is the first Māori of Ngāti Ranginui and Ngāi Te Rangi descent to be nominated for an Academy Award.; Husband-wife team at the time.; Shared with Carthew Neal.	

== Best Actor in a Leading Role ==
Year (Ceremony)	Name	Country	Ethnic group(s)	Film	Status	Milestone / Notes	Ref.
1999 (72nd)	Russell Crowe	(New Zealand)	Māori	The Insider	Nominated	First Māori of Ngāti Porou descent to be nominated for an Academy Award.	
2000 (73rd)	Russell Crowe	(New Zealand)	Māori	Gladiator	Won	First Pacific Islander to win an Academy Award.; First Indigenous person to win Best Actor.; First Indigenous person to receive multiple nominations.; First Māori of Ngāti Porou descent to win an Academy Award.	
2001 (74th)	Russell Crowe	(New Zealand)	Māori	A Beautiful Mind	Nominated	First Indigenous person to receive three consecutive Academy nominations.	
2018 (91st)	Rami Malek	(United States)	Coptic	Bohemian Rhapsody	Won	First Copt to be nominated for and to win an Academy Award.	

== Best Actress in a Leading Role ==
Year (Ceremony)	Name	Country	Ethnic group(s)	Film	Status	Milestone / Notes	Ref.
2003 (76th)	Keisha Castle-Hughes	(New Zealand)	Māori	Whale Rider	Nominated	Debut performance.; First Māori of Tainui and Ngāpuhi descent to be nominated for an Academy Award.; At the time of nomination, she was the youngest ever nominee in the category. She is the now the second youngest after Quvenzhané Wallis.	
2018 (91st)	Yalitza Aparicio	(Mexico)	Mixtec & Trique	Roma	Nominated	Debut performance.; First North American Indigenous woman to receive an Academy Award nomination for acting.	
2023 (96th)	Lily Gladstone	(United States)	Piegan Blackfeet & Nez Perce	Killers of the Flower Moon	Nominated	First Native American actress to be nominated for an Academy Award.	

== Best Actor in a Supporting Role ==
Year (Ceremony)	Name	Country	Ethnic group(s)	Film	Status	Milestones/Notes	Ref.
1970 (43rd)	Chief Dan George	(Canada)	Tsleil-Waututh	Little Big Man	Nominated	First North American Indigenous person to be nominated for an Academy Award.	
1987 (60th)	Sean Connery	(Scotland)	Irish Traveller	The Untouchables	Won	First European Indigenous person to be win an Academy Award	
1990 (63rd)	Graham Greene	(Canada)	Oneida	Dances With Wolves	Nominated	First Oneida to be nominated for an Academy Award.	

== Best Actress in a Supporting Role ==
Year (Ceremony)	Name	Country	Ethnic group(s)	Film	Status	Milestones/Notes	Ref.
1966 (39th)	Jocelyne LaGarde	(French Polynesia)	Tahitian	Hawaii	Nominated	The first and only actor to be nominated for their first and only film performance.; First Indigenous person to be nominated for an Academy Award.; First Tahitian to be nominated for an Academy Award.	

== Best Adapted Screenplay ==
Year (Ceremony)	Name	Country	Ethnic group(s)	Film	Status	Milestone / Notes	Ref.
2019 (92nd)	Taika Waititi	(New Zealand)	Māori	Jojo Rabbit	Won	First Māori of Te Whānau-ā-Apanui descent to win an Academy Award.	

== Best Original Score ==
Year (Ceremony)	Name	Country	Ethnic group(s)	Film	Status	Milestone / Notes	Ref.
1987 (60th)	Jonas Gwangwa	(South Africa)	Northern Ndebele	Cry Freedom	Nominated	First African Indigenous person to be nominated for an Academy Award.; First Indigenous person to be nominated for two Academy Awards in a single year, for Original Score and Original Song.; Shared with George Fenton.	
2023 (96th)	Robbie Robertson	(Canada)	Cayuga & Mohawk	Killers of the Flower Moon	Nominated	First Cayuga and first Mohawk to be nominated for an Academy Award.; Posthumous release.	

== Best Documentary Feature Film ==
Year (Ceremony)	Name	Country	Ethnic group(s)	Film	Status	Milestone / Notes	Ref.
2024 (97th)	Julian Brave NoiseCat	(United States) / (Canada)	Secwépemc	Sugarcane	Nominated	Shared with Emily Kassie and Kellen Quinn	

== Best Original Song ==
Year (Ceremony)	Name	Country	Ethnic group(s)	Film	Song	Status	Milestones/Notes	Ref.
1987 (60th)	Jonas Gwangwa	(South Africa)	Northern Ndebele	Cry Freedom	"Cry Freedom"	Nominated	First African Indigenous person to be nominated for an Academy Award.; First Indigenous person to be nominated for two Academy Awards in a single year, for Original Score and Original Song.; Shared with George Fenton.	
2023 (96th)	Scott George	(United States)	Osage Nation	Killers of the Flower Moon	"Wahzhazhe (A Song for My People)"	Nominated	First member of the Osage Nation to be nominated for an Academy Award.	

== Best Production Design ==
Year (Ceremony)	Name	Country	Ethnic group(s)	Film	Status	Milestone / Notes	Ref.
2012 (85th)	Ra Vincent	(New Zealand)	Māori	The Hobbit: An Unexpected Journey	Nominated	Shared with Dan Hennah and Simon Bright.	
2019 (92nd)	Ra Vincent	(New Zealand)	Māori	Jojo Rabbit	Nominated	Shared with Nora Sopková.	

== Best Sound ==
Year (Ceremony)	Name	Country	Ethnic group(s)	Film	Status	Milestone / Notes	Ref.
2001 (74th)	Hammond Peek	(New Zealand)	Māori	The Lord of the Rings: The Fellowship of the Ring	Nominated	First Māori of Ngāi Tahu and Te Āti Awa descent to be nominated for an Academy Award.; Shared with Christopher Boyes, Michael Semanick and Gethin Creagh.	
2002 (75th)	Hammond Peek	(New Zealand)	Māori	The Lord of the Rings: The Two Towers	Nominated	Shared with Christopher Boyes, Michael Semanick and Michael Hedges.	
2003 (76th)	Hammond Peek	(New Zealand)	Māori	The Lord of the Rings: The Return of the King	Won	First Māori of Ngāi Tahu and Te Āti Awa descent to win an Academy Award.; Shared with Christopher Boyes, Michael Semanick and Michael Hedges.	
2005 (78th)	Hammond Peek	(New Zealand)	Māori	King Kong	Won	First Indigenous person to win multiple Academy Awards.; Most nominated Indigenous person, with four nominations.; Shared with Christopher Boyes, Michael Semanick and Michael Hedges.	

== Best Short Film, Live Action ==
Year (Ceremony)	Name	Country	Ethnic group(s)	Film	Status	Milestone / Notes	Ref.
2004 (77th)	Taika Waititi; Ainsley Gardiner	(New Zealand)	Māori	Two Cars, One Night	Nominated	First Māori of Te Whānau-ā-Apanui descent to be nominated for an Academy Award.; Gardiner is also the first Māori of Ngāti Pikiao and Ngāti Awa descent to be nominated for an Academy Award.	
2023 (96th)	Misan Harriman	(Nigeria) (United Kingdom)	Itsekiri	The After	Nominated	First Itsekiri to be nominated for an Academy Award.; Shared with Nicky Bentham.	

== Best Foreign Language Film ==
Year (Ceremony)	Name	Country	Ethnic group(s)	Film	Status	Milestone / Notes	Ref.
1987 (60th)	Nils Gaup	(Norway)	Sámi	Pathfinder	Nominated	First Arctic Indigenous person to be nominated for an Academy Award.; First European Indigenous person to be nominated for an Academy Award, along with Sean Connery for The Untouchables.	

== Honorary Award ==
Year (Ceremony)	Name	Country	Ethnic group(s)	Milestone / Notes	Ref.
2019 (92nd)	Wes Studi	(United States)	Cherokee Nation (Native American)	First and only Indigenous person to be awarded an Honorary Award.	
