= Morrisa Maltz =

American filmmaker and artist

- Born: U.S.
- Occupation(s): Filmmaker, artist
- Years active: 2013–present

Morrisa Maltz is an American filmmaker and artist. She is best known for writing and directing the films The Unknown Country (2022) and Jazzy (2024).

== Life and career ==
Maltz was raised in San Diego, California. She graduated from Columbia University with a bachelor's degree in Visual Arts. In 2012, she created Mofones, a series of artist-designed iPhone cases. She directed two short films titled The Caretaker (2013) and Odyssea (2014). In 2018, She directed her first feature documentary Ingrid, premiered at the Slamdance Film Festival.

In 2022, Maltz directed her first feature film The Unknown Country, starring Lily Gladstone and Raymond Lee, which premiered at South by Southwest. She again collaborated with Gladstone for a drama film Jazzy (2024), which premiered at the Tribeca Film Festival.

== Filmography ==
Year	Title	Director	Writer	Producer	Note
2013	The Caretaker	Yes	Yes	Yes	Short film
2014	Odyssea	Yes	Yes	Yes	Short film
2018	Ingrid	Yes	Yes	Yes	Documentary
2022	The Unknown Country	Yes	Yes	Yes	Feature film
2024	Jazzy	Yes	Yes	Yes	Feature film

== Awards and nominations ==
Year	Result	Award	Category	Work	Ref.
2014	Nominated	Slamdance Film Festival	Best Narrative Short	Odyssea	
2018	Nominated	Slamdance Film Festival	Best Narrative Short	Ingrid	
2018	Nominated	Atlanta Film Festival	Best Documentary Feature	Ingrid	
2018	Won	Red Rock Film Festival	Best Documentary Featurette	Ingrid	
2022	Won	Denver Film Festival	Honorable Mention	The Unknown Country	
2022	Won	Hell's Half Mile Film & Music Festival	Best Feature	The Unknown Country	
2022	Nominated	Montclair Film Festival	Future/Now Competition	The Unknown Country	
2022	Nominated	Champs-Élysées Film Festival	Longs métrages américains	The Unknown Country	
2022	Nominated	Calgary International Film Festival	International Narrative Competition	The Unknown Country	
2022	Nominated	South by Southwest	SXSW Adam Yauch Hörnblowér Award	The Unknown Country	
2023	Nominated	Red Nation Film Festival	Best Director	The Unknown Country	
2024	Nominated	Independent Spirit Awards	John Cassavetes Award	The Unknown Country	
2024	Nominated	Cinema Eye Honors	Heterodox Award	The Unknown Country	
2024	Nominated	Tribeca Festival	Best U.S. Narrative Feature	Jazzy	
