= Jazzy (film) =

2024 American drama film

- Theatrical release poster
- Directed by: Morrisa Maltz
- Written by: Morrisa Maltz; Lainey Bearkiller Shangreaux; Vanara Taing; Andrew Hajek
- Produced by: Morrisa Maltz; Lainey Bearkiller Shangreaux; Miranda Bailey; Natalie Whelan; Elliott Whitton; John Way; Vanara Taing; Tommy Heitkamp
- Starring: Jasmine Bearkiller Shangreaux; Syriah Foohead Means; Lily Gladstone
- Cinematography: Andrew Hajek
- Edited by: Vanara Taing; Laura Colwell
- Music by: Alexis Marsh
- Production companies: Duplass Brothers Productions; Cold Iron Pictures; Fit Via Vi
- Distributed by: Vertical
- Release dates: June 9, 2024 (Tribeca); February 7, 2025 (United States)
- Running time: 86 minutes
- Country: United States
- Language: English

Jazzy is a 2024 American drama film directed and produced by Morrisa Maltz, from a screenplay by Maltz, Lainey Bearkiller Shangreaux, Vanara Taing and Andrew Hajek. The film serves as a follow up to The Unknown Country by Maltz. It stars Jasmine Bearkiller Shangreaux, Syriah Foohead Means, and Lily Gladstone. Gladstone, Mark Duplass and Jay Duplass serve as executive producers.

It had its world premiere at Tribeca Festival on June 9, 2024, and was released on February 7, 2025, by Vertical.

== Premise ==
Jazzy navigates the challenges of growing up. When her best friend moves away, she experiences feelings of loss and independence.

== Cast ==
- Jasmine Bearkiller Shangreaux as Jazzy
- Syriah Foohead Means as Syriah
- Richard Ray Whitman as Grandpa August
- Raymond Lee as Isaac
- Lily Gladstone as Tana

== Production ==
In February 2024, it was announced Jasmine Bearkiller Shangreaux, Syriah Foohead Means, Richard Ray Whitman, Raymond Lee and Lily Gladstone had joined the cast of the film, with Gladstone, Mark Duplass and Jay Duplass set to serve as executive producers, and Marissa Maltz directing from a screenplay she co-wrote alongside Lainey Bearkiller Shangreaux, Vanara Taing and Andrew Hajek.

Production concluded in July 2023, with SAG-AFTRA granting an interim agreement for the film.

== Release ==
The film had its world premiere at Tribeca Festival on June 9, 2024. In January 2025, Vertical acquired North American, U.K. and Irish distribution rights, and set it for a February 7, 2025, release. It premiered at the Milwaukee Film Festival on April 27, 2025.

== Reception ==
=== Critical reception ===
On the review aggregator website Rotten Tomatoes, 95% of 21 critics' reviews are positive, with an average rating of 7.9/10. Metacritic, which uses a weighted average, assigned the film a score of 83 out of 100, based on 8 critics, indicating "universal acclaim".

Tomris Laffly of Variety praised the film, writing: "Touched by a youthful spirit, this feminine coming-of-age tale reinforces Maltz as a true independent and a soulful storyteller." Kate Erbland of IndieWire gave the film a B+, writing: "This is a filmmaker who knows how to tell story by showing it, and by trusting her audience to come along for the ride. How rare that has become these days."

=== Accolades ===
Award	Date of ceremony	Category	Nominee(s)	Result	Ref.
Independent Spirit Awards	February 22, 2025	Best Editing	Laura Colwell; Vanara Taing	Nominated	
Independent Spirit Awards	February 22, 2025	John Cassavetes Award	Morrisa Maltz, Lainey Shangreaux, Andrew Hajek, Vanara Taing, Miranda Bailey, Tommy Heitkamp, John Way, Natalie Whalen, and Elliott Whitton	Nominated	
