= Summit Mountain (Glacier National Park) =

Mountain in the state of Montana

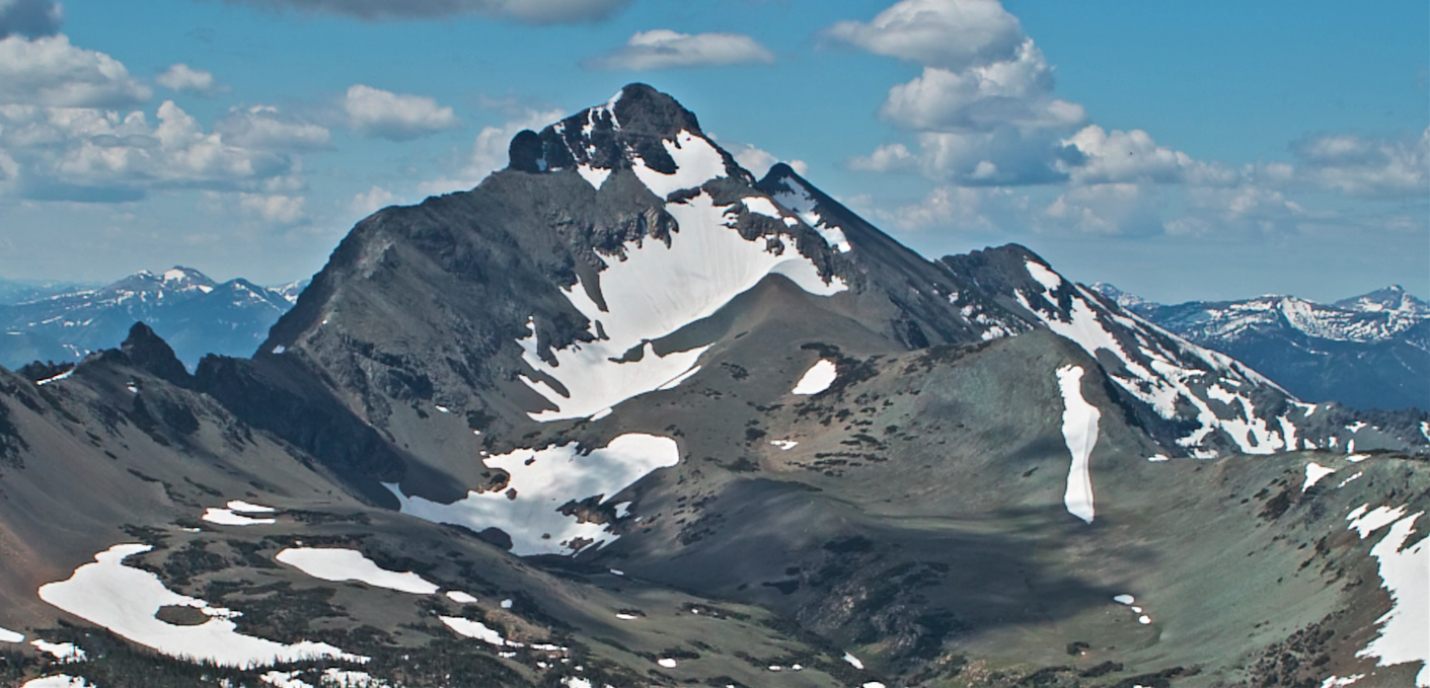
- Summit Mountain as seen from thenortheast. Takan from Calf Robe Mountain.

Highest point
- Elevation: 8,775 ft (2,675 m)
- Prominence: 1,819 ft (554 m)
- Coordinates: 48°21′14″N 113°22′11″W

Geography
- Location within Montana Location within the United States
- Location: Flathead County, Montana, Glacier County, Montana, U.S.
- Parent range: Lewis Range
- Topo map(s): USGS Summit, MT

Summit Mountain (8,775 feet (2,675 m)) is located in the Lewis Range, Glacier National Park in the U.S. state of Montana. Summit Mountain towers to the north of Marias Pass and is situated along the Continental Divide.

Little Dog Mountain (left). Summit Mountain (right).

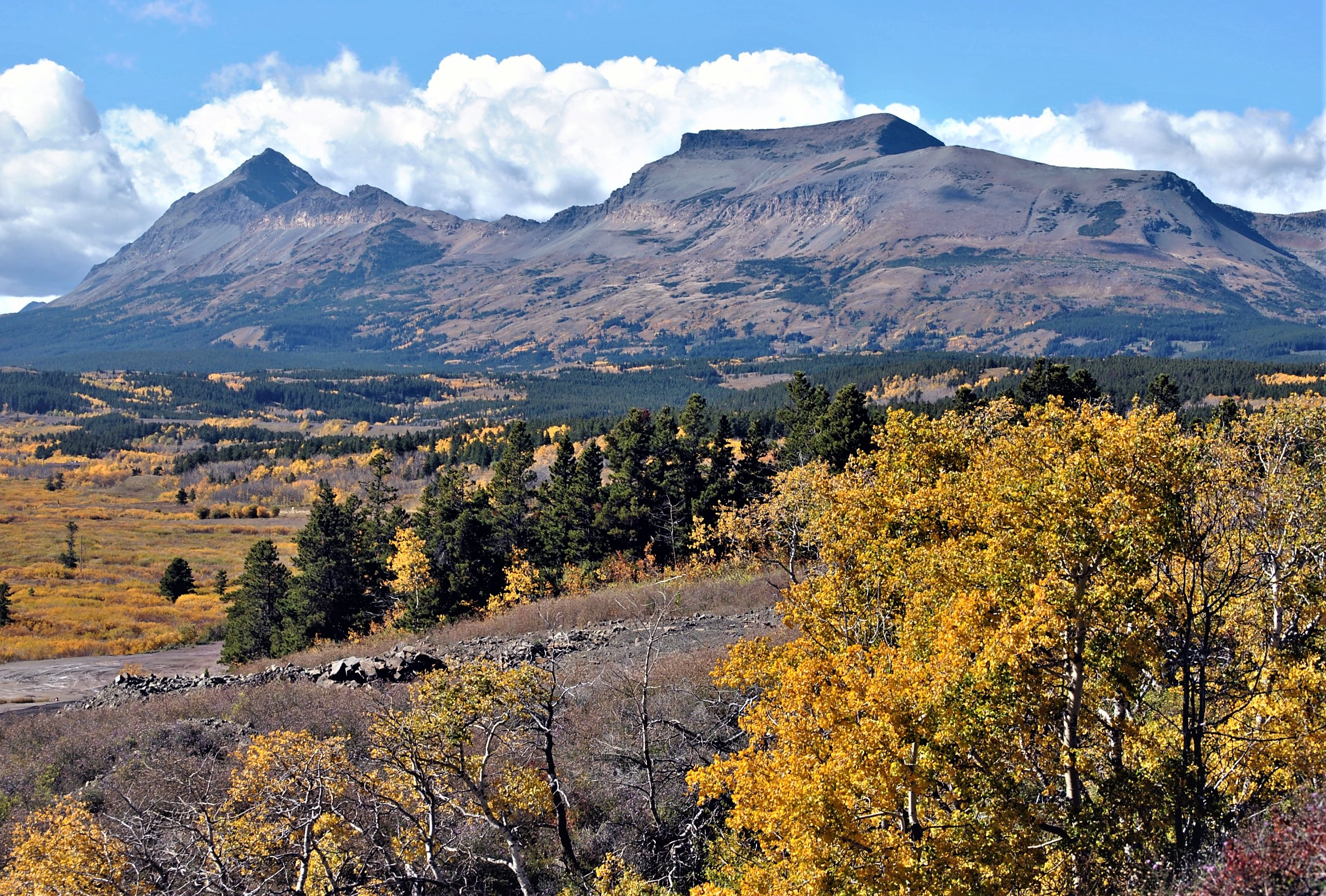
Summit Mountain (left). Calf Robe Mountain (right).

== See also ==
- Mountains and mountain ranges of Glacier National Park (U.S.)
