= Red Crow =

Kainai Nation chief and signatory of First Nations-Canadian Treaty 7 (c. 1830-1900)

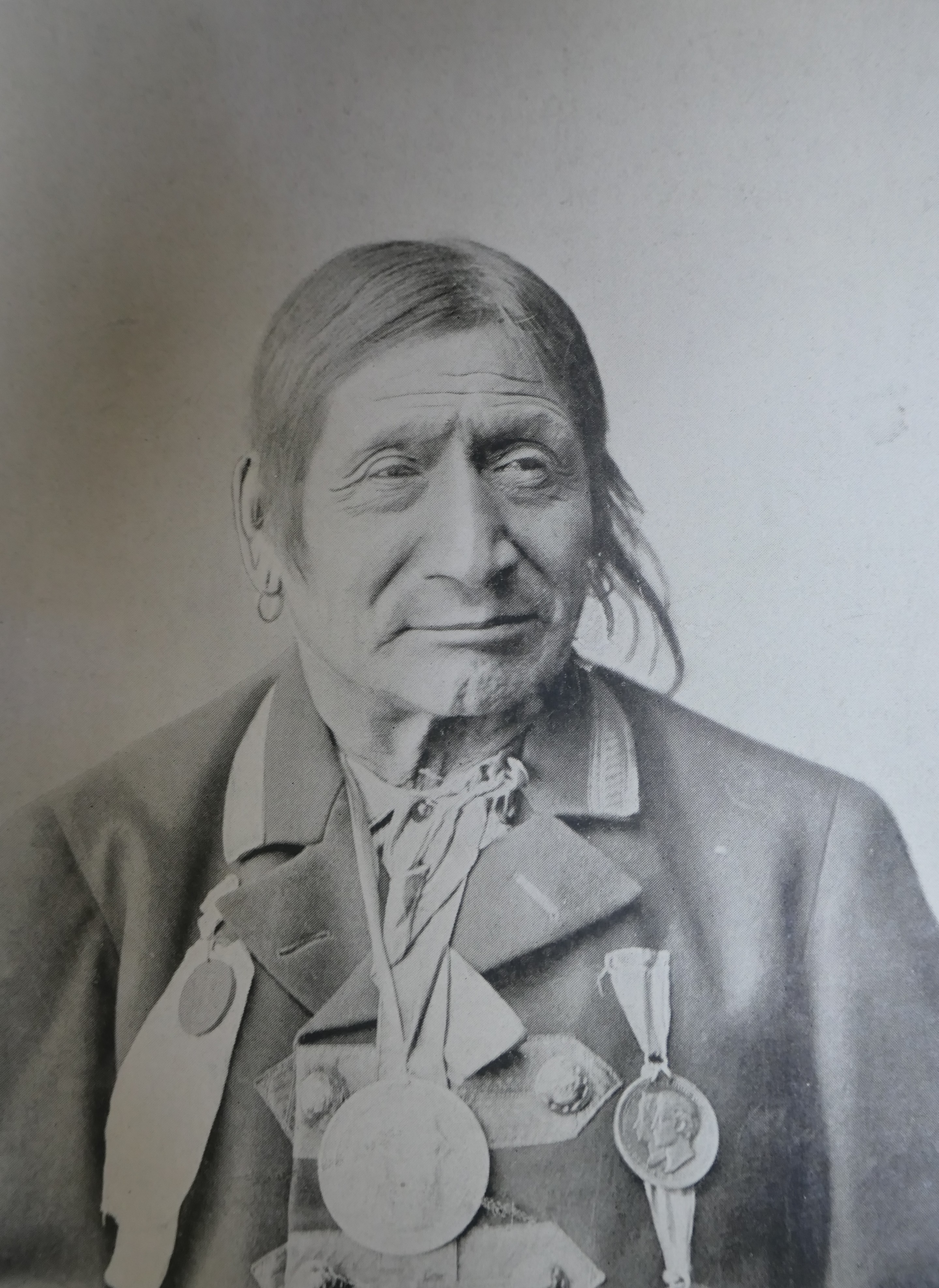
- c. 1895

Kainai Nation leader

Personal details
- Born: c. 1830 Kainai territory (present-day Alberta)
- Died: August 28, 1900 (aged 69–70)
- Relations: Lily Gladstone (great-great granddaughter)

Red Crow (c. 1830 – 28 August 1900), also known as Captured the Gun Inside, Lately Gone and Sitting White Bull, was a Kainai leader.

== Name ==
His native name Mí’kai’stoowa (Blackfoot: ᒍᖼᐟᐧᒪᖷ) was sometimes romanized as Mékaisto or Mi’kasto or incorporated as John Mikahestow.

== Biography ==
Red Crow was born in Kainai territory in modern Alberta to Black Bear and Handsome Woman, and was a descendant of tribal chiefs. He earned a reputation as a warrior during raids against other Indigenous groups in the 1840s and 1850s. He succeeded to the chieftainship in 1870 after the death of his father from smallpox. He was a signatory to Treaty 7 in 1877. In the period after the treaty was concluded, he led the development of agriculture on his reserve.

In 1872, Red Crow murdered his brother Kit Fox during a domestic dispute, beating him repeatedly with a rock. In response to this, Red Crow's surviving siblings (brothers Sheep Old Man and Not So Good, sisters Revenge Walker and Paper Woman) fled from Red Crow's band. After Revenge Walker discovered that her husband Running Bird abandoned her because Red Crow withheld horses he owed to Running Bird, Revenge Walker went to confront Red Crow but Red Crow had already left camp.

According to the Canadian Encyclopedia, Red Crow "remained a strong proponent of Indigenous culture and beliefs. In the wake of the disastrous effects of diseases and other external demands, he was a calm and wise leader who contributed to stability during a time of tremendous political and economic change."

Red Crow Mountain in Glacier National Park, Montana, is named in his honour. American actress Lily Gladstone is Red Crow's great-great grandchild.
