= Richard Ray Whitman =

Yuchi-Muscogee visual artist, poet, and actor

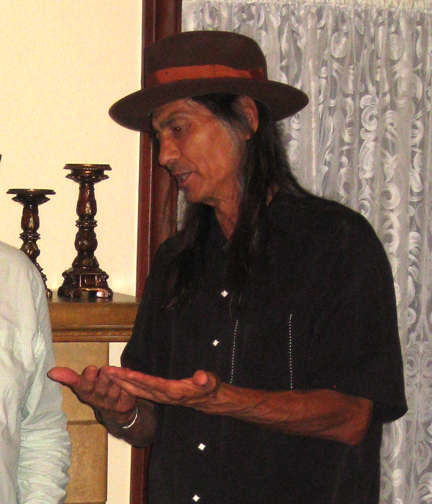
- Richard Ray Whitman, 2010
- Born: 1949 (age 76–77); Claremore, Oklahoma, U.S.
- Citizenship: Muscogee (Creek) Nation and American
- Education: Institute of American Indian Arts
- Known for: Acting, Photography, mixed-media, film, painting
- Notable work: Street Chiefs
- Movement: American Indian Movement
- Website: richardraywhitman.wordpress.com

Richard Ray Whitman (born 1949) is a Yuchi/Muscogee multidisciplinary visual artist, poet, and actor. He is enrolled in the Muscogee Nation and lives in Oklahoma.

== Early life and education ==
Whitman was born in Claremore, Oklahoma, in 1949. His maternal grandmother was Polly Long. Like many Yuchis, Whitman is enrolled in the Muscogee Nation. He grew up in Gypsy, Oklahoma, and attended Bristow High School. He also attended the Institute of American Indian Arts, the California Institute of the Arts, and the Oklahoma School of Photography in Oklahoma City.

== Career ==
Whitman began his art career as a painter and expanded to photography, installation, and video art. In 1973, he participated in the 71-day occupation of Wounded Knee and created art during the occupation.

=== Photography ===
Whitman is known for his black-and-white photography portraying contemporary Native realities, especially his "Street Chiefs Series" from the 1970s and 1980s. "Street Chiefs" features images of homeless Native men, primarily in downtown Oklahoma City. "The contemporary Indian in the isolation of the city canyons and rural reservations is avoided. The boredom, pain, frustration, poverty of the reality-counterbalance of our lives is harsh, unattractive, and unmarketable." His photographic portraits are compassionate and empathetic to the lives of homeless natives and places them in the larger context of Indian Removal, which forced tribes from all over the country to Indian Territory.

From the 1980s onward, Whitman has incorporated text and computer graphics in his photography to create collage or mixed media. His socio-politically informed work often deals with the issues of homeland and dispossession.

=== Videography and acting career ===
Collaborating with Yuchi poet and brother Joe Dale Tate Nevaquaya, Whitman created video to document the Yuchi language. Together they worked with French filmmaker Pierre Lobstein in the 1990s. Whitman read T.C. Cannon's poetry in the video "Mazerunner: The Life and Art of T.C. Cannon" which was directed and edited by Phillip Albert. This work was subsequently screened at the Metropolitan Museum of Art (3/19/1994) and was presented on the Bravo Cable Channel and the Independent Film Channel from May 1995 through June 1996.

== Filmography ==
=== Film ===
Year	Title	Role	Notes
1988	War Party	Harold	
2003	American Indian Graffiti: This Thing Life	Barry	
2006	Rune	Tecpatel	
2007	Four Sheets to the Wind	Frankie Smallhill	
2007	Missionary Man	Chief Dan	
2009	The Only Good Indian	Father of stolen child	
2009	Barking Water	Frankie	
2013	Winter in the Blood	John First Raise	
2013	The Cherokee Word for Water	Roger	
2014	Drunktown's Finest	Harmon, John	
2016	Neither Wolf Nor Dog	Grover	
2021	Oklahoma Mon Amour	Lloyd	
2021	Montford: The Chickasaw Rancher	Joe Carlton	
2022	The Unknown Country	Grandpa August	
2024	Jazzy	Grandpa August	

=== Television ===
Year	Title	Role	Notes
1994	Lakota Woman: Siege at Wounded Knee	Carter Camp	Television film
2019	Chambers	Harrison Yazzie	3 episodes
2021–2022	Reservation Dogs	Old Man Fixico	5 episodes

== See also ==
- List of Native American artists
- Visual arts by indigenous peoples of the Americas
