= Calf Robe Mountain =

Mountain in the state of Montana

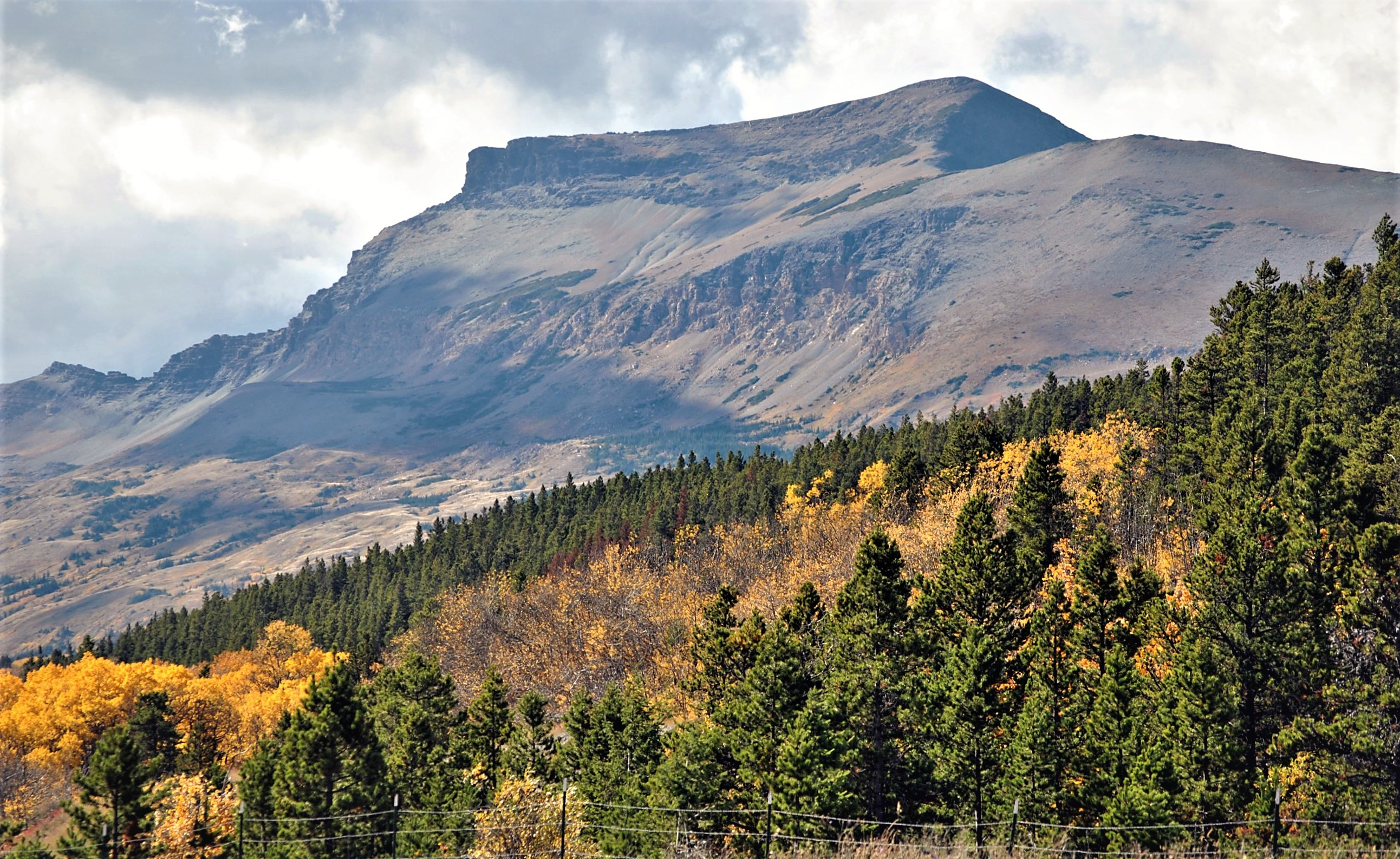
- East aspect

Highest point
- Elevation: 7,948 ft (2,423 m)
- Prominence: 850 ft (260 m)
- Parent peak: Summit Mountain (8,775 ft)
- Isolation: 2.75 mi (4.43 km)
- Coordinates: 48°23′15″N 113°19′59″W

Geography
- Location within Montana Location within the United States
- Location: Glacier National Park; Flathead County / Glacier County; Montana, U.S.
- Parent range: Lewis Range; Rocky Mountains
- Topo map: USGS Dancing Lady Mountain

Calf Robe Mountain is a 7,948-foot-elevation (2,423-meter) mountain summit located in Glacier National Park in the U.S. state of Montana. It is situated on the Continental Divide in the Lewis Range, and can be seen from Highway 2 midway between Marias Pass and East Glacier Park. The summit is set on the border shared by Flathead County and Glacier County. Topographic relief is significant as the east aspect rises 2,500 feet (760 meters) in one mile. The immediate area between the mountain and highway is known for its aspen and beaver dams.

== Etymology ==
The mountain's name, which commemorates Calf Robe, member of the Blackfeet, was submitted by the National Park Service in 1939, and officially adopted in 1940 by the United States Board on Geographic Names. Legend has it that Calf Robe supposedly had a weird experience with a grizzly bear about 1870. Calf Robe was deserted by his fellow warriors in enemy country and left to die; but he was soon rescued by a grizzly bear, which brought him food and carried him to help. The grizzly only asked a favor in return: that Calf Robe would never kill a bear in winter, which is why the Piikani will never kill a hibernating bear. The Blackfeet name for Calf Robe is "Onistai'yi".

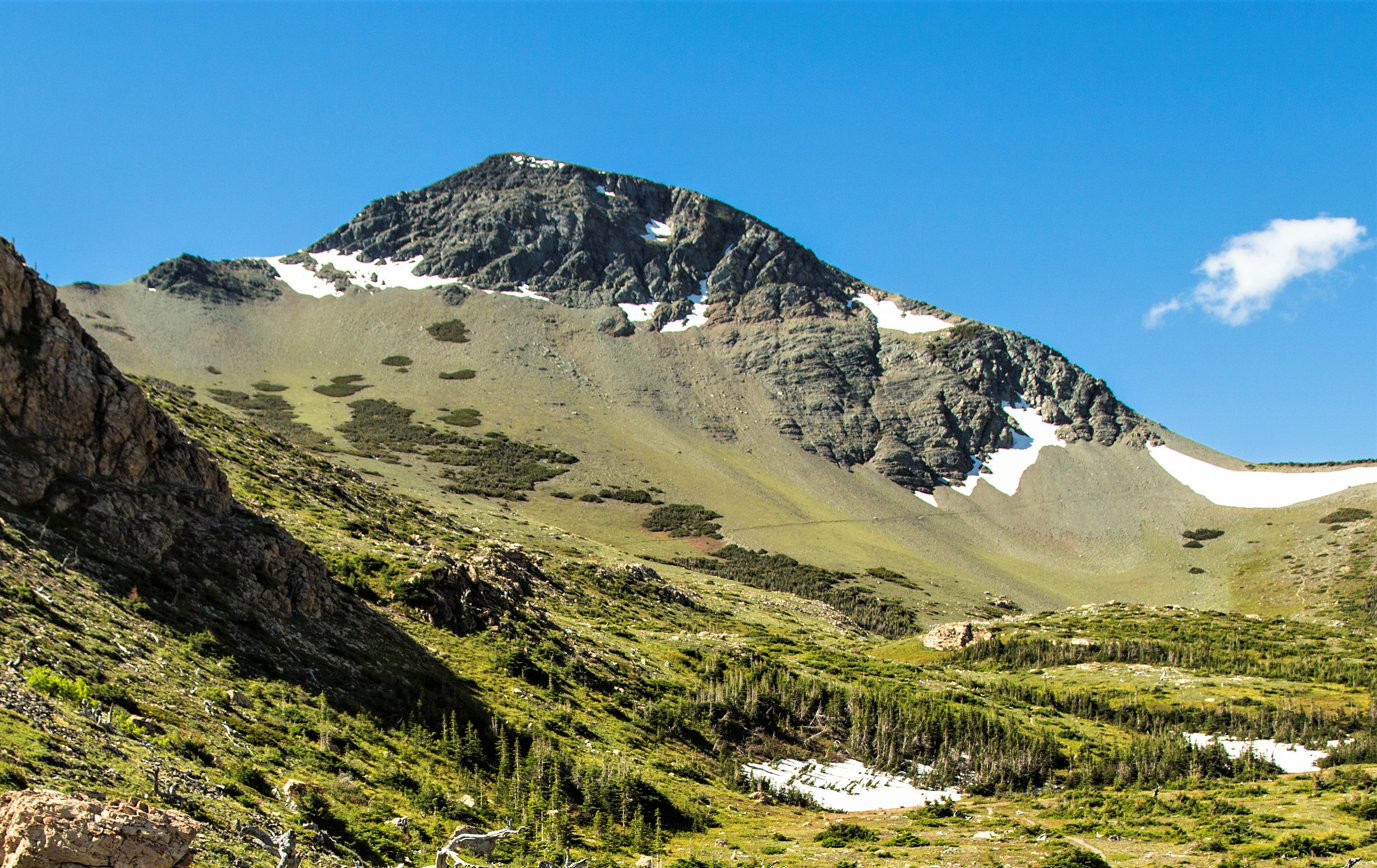
North aspect, from Firebrand Pass Trail, with the pass to right.

== Geology ==
Like other mountains in Glacier National Park, Calf Robe Mountain is composed of sedimentary rock laid down during the Precambrian to Jurassic periods. Formed in shallow seas, this sedimentary rock was initially uplifted beginning 170 million years ago when the Lewis Overthrust fault pushed an enormous slab of precambrian rocks 3 mi (4.8 km) thick, 50 miles (80 km) wide and 160 miles (260 km) long over younger rock of the cretaceous period.

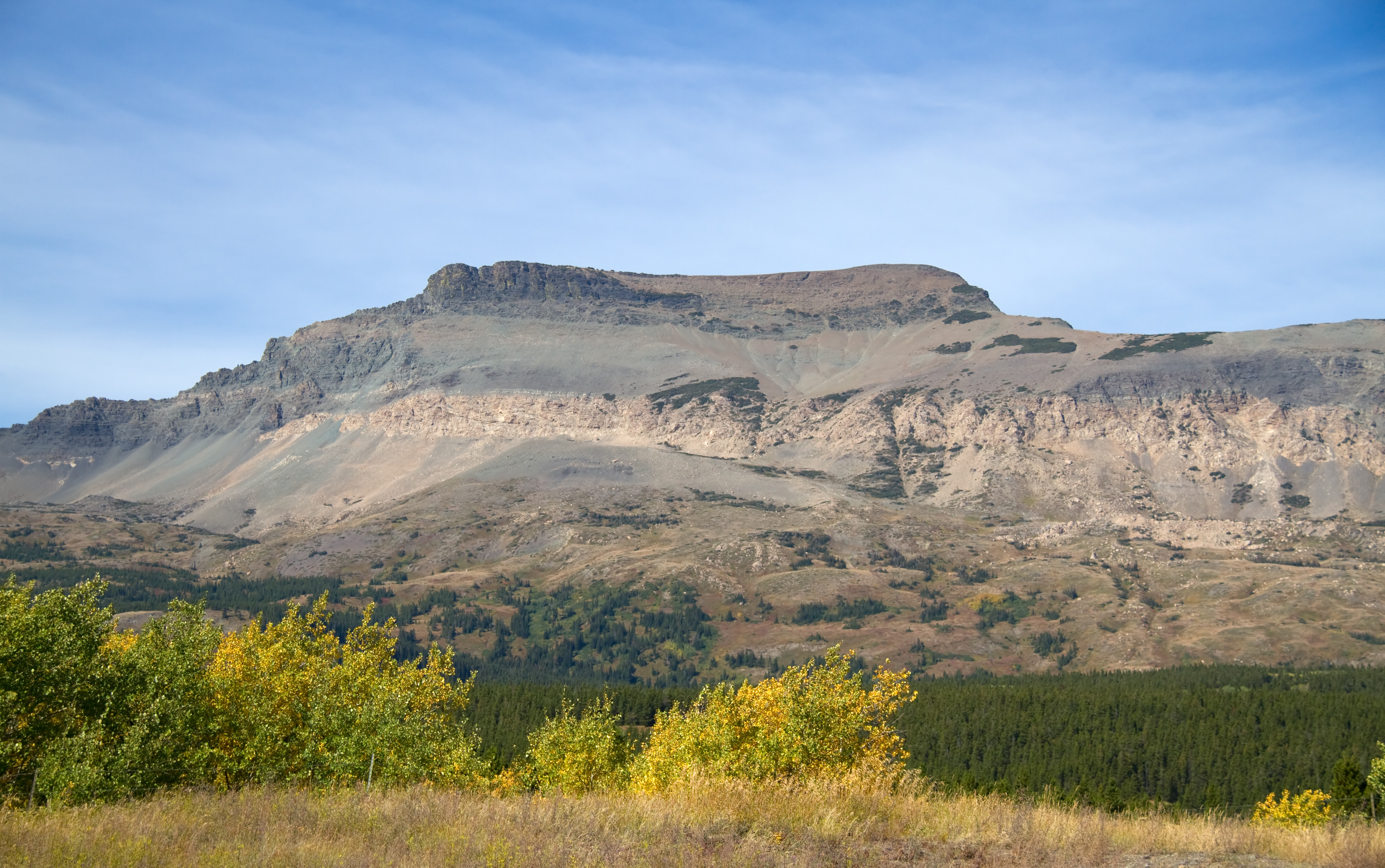
Calf Robe Glacier, east aspect

== Climate ==
According to the Köppen climate classification system, Calf Robe Mountain is located in an alpine subarctic climate zone with long, cold, snowy winters, and cool to warm summers. Winter temperatures can drop below −10 °F with wind chill factors below −30 °F. Due to its altitude, it receives precipitation all year, as snow in winter, and as thunderstorms in summer. Precipitation runoff from the east side of the mountain drains into tributaries of the Two Medicine River, and the west side drains to Ole Creek, which is a tributary of Middle Fork Flathead River.

== See also ==
- Mountains and mountain ranges of Glacier National Park (U.S.)
- Geology of the Rocky Mountains

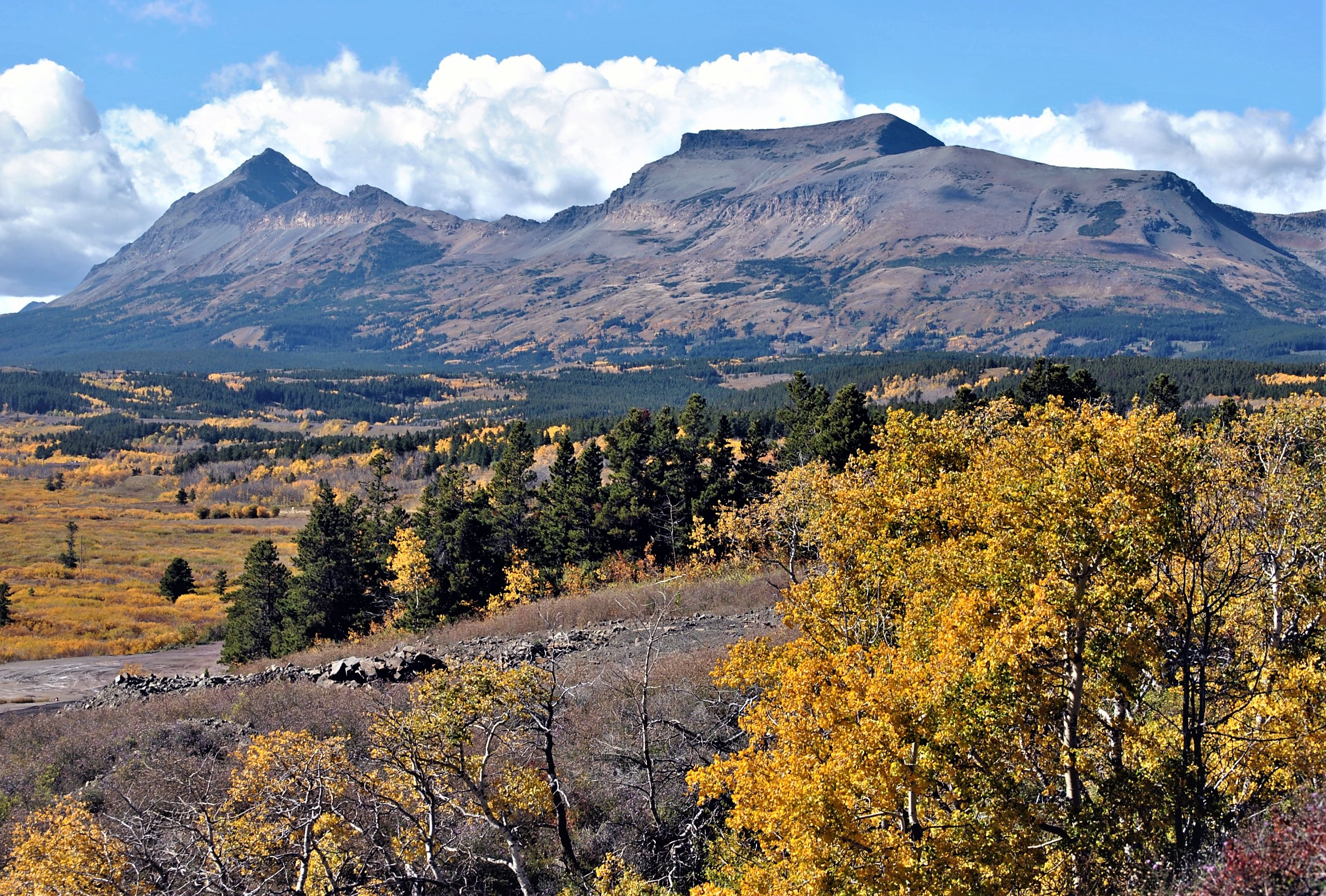
Calf Robe Mountain seen with parent Summit Mountain (left)
