= Murder of Reena Virk =

1997 murder of a teenager in Canada

Reena Virk
- Born: March 10, 1983; Saanich, British Columbia, Canada
- Died: November 14, 1997 (aged 14); Saanich, British Columbia, Canada
- Cause of death: Homicide by forcible drowning
- Parents: Manjit Virk (father); Suman Virk (mother)

Reena Virk (March 10, 1983 – November 14, 1997) was a 14-year-old Indo-Canadian girl, who was beaten by a group of teenagers and then drowned by two of those teenagers, 14-year-old Kelly Ellard and 16-year-old Warren Glowatski, in Saanich, British Columbia, Canada. Her status as a victim of bullying prior to her murder attracted substantial media attention in Canada. Eight teenagers were tried and convicted in relation to her death; six involved in the beating received sentences ranging from 60-day conditional sentences to one year in jail, while the two who killed Virk were convicted of second-degree murder and given life sentences. The Globe and Mail commented at the time that her case was "elevated into a national tragedy". A pair of Canadian sociologists have described the case as a watershed moment for a "moral panic" over girl violence by the Canadian public in the late 1990s.

== Early life ==
Reena Virk (born March 10, 1983) lived in Saanich, British Columbia and attended Colquitz Junior High School. Her father was an immigrant from India, while her mother came from an Indo-Canadian family who had converted from Hinduism to the Jehovah's Witness religion after arriving in Canada. Her immediate family was "a minority within a minority," as they were Jehovah's Witnesses in the local South Asian community of 3,000 which was predominantly Sikh.

Virk was described as desperate for acceptance amongst her peers but was taunted and ostracized by girls. She began to rebel due to such peer influence, smoking marijuana and cigarettes. Bullied for her weight and insecurity, she was said to feel restricted by the rules of her family's faith. In 1996, she reported her father for sexual molestation. As a result, she was moved from her family's home into the province's care for several months in 1996. She later dropped the charges and returned home.

== Murder ==
On November 14, 1997, when she was aged 14, Virk was swarmed and beaten by a group of teenagers, under the Craigflower bridge in Saanich, British Columbia, Canada. When Virk was trying to leave the area, two of her attackers assaulted her again and took her back to the Gorge Waterway, where they murdered her.^{:5} Virk's body was found by police divers on November 22, 1997, in a 'shallow tidal pool' around 1 kilometre away from where she was murdered. Laurel Gray, the pathologist who conducted Virk's autopsy, found that she had severe internal and external bruising; her brain was swollen and there was a shoe imprint on her head "consistent with a stomping or a kick". She also found pebbles in Virk's throat, which was consistent with drowning face down in shallow water.

Virk's murder, for her prior bullying and the young accused, attracted substantial media scrutiny in Canada. Six teenage girls, aged 14 to 16 and referred to as the "Shoreline Six", were tried and convicted for assaulting Virk . Another two teenagers, Warren Paul Glowatski and Kelly Marie Ellard, were convicted for her murder.

=== Perpetrators ===
Warren Glowatski and seven female perpetrators were charged for various crimes pertaining to Virk's death. Six of the underaged female perpetrators were referred to in court documents as N.C. (Nicole Cook), N.P. (Nicole Patterson), M.G.P. (Missy Grace Pleich), C.A.K. (Courtney Keith), G.O. (Gail Ooms), and K.M.E. (Kelly Marie Ellard).

==== Warren Paul Glowatski ====
Warren Glowatski, born April 26, 1981, in Medicine Hat, Alberta, was 16 years old when he murdered Virk. Glowatski and his parents moved around frequently; he lived in Estevan, Saskatchewan; Regina, Saskatchewan; and Castlegar, British Columbia.

In June 1999 Glowatski was convicted of second-degree murder and given a life sentence. An appeal for his conviction was dismissed in November 2001. Because he was 16 at the time of the murder, he was eligible for parole after serving seven years. In November 2004, he was denied his first chance at day parole.

The Virks did not contest the parole, because Glowatski expressed remorse and responsibility for his part in the murder. In July 2006, he was granted unescorted temporary absences from jail. By December 2006, Glowatski was eligible to apply for day parole again, which he was granted in June 2007.

During his incarceration, Glowatski discovered that he was Métis; even though this had not formed part of his upbringing, this played a large role in parole hearings as he asked the parole board to incorporate his elders into the process and various healing circles and other forms of restorative justice were used, bringing Glowatski and Virk's parents together. In receiving day parole he proceeded to hug every member of the parole board and those present, including the Virks.

Glowatski was released on full parole in June 2010.

==== Kelly Marie Ellard ====
Kelly Ellard (born August 9, 1982) was 15 years old when she murdered Virk. Ellard stood trial three times for the murder, and was convicted twice: initially in March 2000 for second-degree murder in Virk's death, a conviction that was overturned with a new trial ordered in February 2003, followed by a second trial that ended in a mistrial (hung jury) in July 2004.

A third trial was ordered and Ellard was convicted again of second-degree murder in April 2005 and given an automatic life sentence with no parole eligibility for seven years; however, the BC Court of Appeal overturned the conviction based on an error by the trial judge. On June 12, 2009, the Supreme Court of Canada (Supreme Court) overturned the BC Court of Appeal in an 8–1 decision, ruling that Ellard's third trial had been fairly executed, that the error by the trial judge was "harmless", and that her conviction would stand.

Ellard was granted conditional day parole in November 2017 to attend medical appointments and mother-toddler programs, following the birth of her child. In October 2018, when her day parole was extended, the documents from the Parole Board of Canada revealed that Ellard had changed her name to Kerry Marie Sim. In August 2019, her parole was extended to overnight stays outside of custody.

In May 2022, the then 39-year-old Sim (Ellard) waived her right to a parole hearing, as she did not yet feel ready to return to society on a full time basis. By law, the Parole Board of Canada was still required to review her feasibility for full parole, and also deemed her unworthy of moving beyond day parole. In January 2025, Sim (Ellard) was arrested for breach of parole. A Canada-wide warrant had been issued for her before the arrest, though the specific conditions she violated have not been publicly disclosed. In June 2025, her day parole was canceled, in a decision which confirmed that Sim had failed repeated drug tests starting with the January incident, and expanded to state that "You disregarded minimum supervision expectations and when this was addressed with you, you became hostile, argumentative, antagonizing, lacked accountability and deflected blame."

==== Nicole Cook ====
Nicole Cook, born 1984, lived in a group home at the time. In the MSNBC documentary Bloodlust Under the Bridge, Cook spoke about how she took a lit cigarette and put it out on Virk's face, initiating the mayhem that followed. Cook further explained how she repeatedly punched and kicked Virk as she was being pummelled by the other assailants. At the end of the interview, Cook then lambasted the accusation that she had anything to do with Virk's actual murder because Ellard was the participant charged for the murder. Veteran Dateline NBC reporter Keith Morrison then asked, "Would the murder have ever happened if you hadn't started the fight by burning her face with your cigarette?" and Cook replied, "I don't know. Maybe not. Maybe."... Cook also returned to the crime scene the day after the killing, accompanied by Pleich, and retrieved Virk's shoes and sweater. They took these items back to their group home and forced another resident of the group home to hide Reena's clothing. The resident proceeded to inform staff at the group home, who then notified the police.

=== Possible motives ===
A book about the case, Under the Bridge by Rebecca Godfrey, details some of the motives that may have led to Virk's death. Two of the girls convicted in the initial beating allege that Virk stole a phone book from Nicole Cook and started calling Cook's friends and spreading rumours about her. Another girl, M.G.P, was allegedly targeting Virk because of her race alongside the others in the group such as Glowatski, who allegedly were known to have bullied Virk. Virk once lived with the two girls in a youth group home. It is suggested she may have done those things in order to assert herself as "tough". The book also reveals that Virk was initially considered a runaway when her mother first reported her missing to the Saanich Police Department. The book Under the Bridge incorrectly documented the Missing Persons report as being made to the Royal Canadian Mounted Police. Two Russian sisters, who lived in the youth group home, were prompted to contact the police upon hearing that Virk was most likely dead.

== Timeline ==
- November 14, 1997, 11:00 p.m. - Reena Virk arrives to a large congregation of youths at Shoreline Community Middle School in View Royal which disperses when police arrive. Ellard calls for the assault of Virk, who is chased by her youth assailants, when she attempts to call her parents from a phone booth. The youths trap Virk at the phone booth and then take her under the Craigflower Bridge, proceeding to swarm, beat her, and then walk away. Virk then leaves the bridge and walks away, when she is followed and attacked by Ellard and Glowatski who smash her head against a tree, knocking her unconscious, and then drag her body into the Gorge Waterway where she drowns.
- November 22, 1997 – Virk's body is found by investigators and the Dive Unit among the reeds in the Portage Inlet.
- February 9, 1998 – Three teenage girls plead guilty to assault causing bodily harm for their roles in the attack.
- February 13, 1998 – Three more girls are convicted of assault causing bodily harm.
- Between April and May 1998 – Six teenage girls are sentenced for their roles in the beating of Virk. Sentences range from 60-day conditional sentences to one year in jail.
- June 1999 – Glowatski, the only male involved in the crime, is convicted of second-degree murder and sentenced to life in prison with no chance of parole for seven years.
- March 9, 2000 – Ellard is convicted of second-degree murder in adult court, where she is sentenced to life in prison with no chance of full parole for five years.
- November 15, 2000 – 3 years and 1 day after the murder of Reena Virk, her parents Manjit and Suman Virk sue the teenagers who took part in the beating, the BC government, and several other parties.
- February 4, 2003 – The BC Court of Appeal announces that due to improprieties in the way Ellard was questioned during her first trial, a new trial would be ordered. It is impermissible for the Crown to ask the accused why witnesses would lie about the accused.
- June 14, 2004 – Ellard's second trial begins.
- July 18, 2004 – A mistrial is declared in Ellard's second trial after the jury declares it is deadlocked 11 to 1.
- February 21, 2005 – Ellard's third trial begins.
- April 12, 2005 – Ellard is found guilty of second degree murder. She is given an automatic life sentence with no parole for at least 7 years.
- July 20, 2006 – After serving just under nine years of a life sentence, Glowatski is granted unescorted temporary passes by the National Parole Board. The Virk family supports the decision.
- August 9, 2006 – Ellard appeals her conviction, asking for a fourth trial or an acquittal. The Crown has the option to appeal, hold a fourth trial, or abandon prosecution.
- April 2009 – Ellard's appeal goes before the Supreme Court of Canada.
- June 12, 2009 – The Supreme Court of Canada reinstates the second-degree murder conviction against Ellard, putting an end to a legal case that spanned more than a decade.
- June 23, 2010 – Glowatski is released on parole.
- January 18, 2017 – Ellard is denied parole.
- November 30, 2017 – Ellard is granted day parole.
- October 30, 2018 – Ellard's day parole is extended; the ruling notes that she had changed her name to Kerry Marie Sim.
- August 22, 2019 – Ellard (Sim) is granted overnight leaves and extended day parole.
- July 14, 2024 - Ellard (Sim) has day parole revoked.

== In popular culture ==
The murder of Reena Virk inspired a monologue play, The Shape of a Girl (2001), by Joan MacLeod, and a novel, The Beckoners by Carrie Mac.

The case was also the subject of a thesis published in a 2004 book, titled Girls' Violence; Myths and Realities. Sheila Batacharya, the author of the thesis "Racism, 'Girl Violence' and the Murder of Reena Virk", discusses the case from a feminist perspective and examines why the argument from media and the police that the murder was not racially motivated may not have been entirely accurate. Batacharya also argues that the narrative of "girl violence", which academics, policymakers, and journalists have asserted is evidenced by Virk's murder, obscures other investigations and explanations surrounding this murder.

The case was the subject of the 2005 book Under the Bridge: The True Story of the Murder of Reena Virk by Rebecca Godfrey. In 2007, it was announced that Reese Witherspoon had acquired film rights for the book, with plans to adapt it into a movie with her production company, Type A Films. In 2010, filming for the movie was said to begin in 2011, but the project stalled in development.

Reena's father, Manjit Virk, wrote a book about the murder of his daughter: Reena: A Father’s Story (2008), which is highly critical of the B.C. Ministry of Children and Family Development and the B.C. justice system; Reena was murdered under the voluntary care of the Ministry, yet no apology was given or responsibility taken.

In December 2010 and 2012, students from Walkerville High School in Windsor, Ontario, performed a play based on the death of Reena Virk for members of the community, as well as the Virk parents.

In 2015, Soraya Peerbaye published a series of poems dedicated to the murder of Reena Virk entitled Tell: poems for a girlhood. The book was shortlisted for the 2016 Griffin Poetry Prize.

The 2021 detective novel Beneath Devil's Bridge by Loreth Anne White was inspired by the case.

In 2022, filmmaker Quinn Sheppard was announced to be adapting Rebecca Godfrey's book into a TV miniseries. The series Under the Bridge premiered on Hulu on April 17, 2024. Reena Virk was portrayed by Vritika Gupta, with Riley Keough starring as Godfrey. The miniseries ran for eight episodes, from April 17 to May 29, 2024.

== See also ==
- List of solved missing person cases: 1950–1999
- Murder of Mattia Ahmet Minguzzi
