= The Unknown Country =

Film by Morrisa Maltz

- Official release poster
- Directed by: Morrisa Maltz
- Screenplay by: Morrisa Maltz
- Story by: Lily Gladstone; Morrisa Maltz; Lainey Bearkiller Shangreaux; Vanara Taing
- Produced by: Katherine Harper; Laura Heberton
- Starring: Lily Gladstone; Raymond Lee
- Cinematography: Andrew Hajek
- Edited by: Vanara Taing
- Music by: Samuel Jones; Alexis Marsh; Neil Halstead
- Production companies: Cold Iron Pictures; Wooden Fingers Studios
- Distributed by: Music Box Films
- Release dates: March 13, 2022 (SXSW); July 28, 2023 (United States)
- Running time: 85 minutes
- Country: United States
- Language: English
- Box office: $68,890

The Unknown Country is a 2022 American drama film directed by Morrisa Maltz, from a screenplay by Maltz and a story by Maltz, Lily Gladstone, Lainey Bearkiller Shangreaux, and Vanara Taing. It stars Gladstone and Raymond Lee.

The film had its world premiere at South by Southwest on March 13, 2022. It was theatrically released by Music Box Films in the United States on July 28, 2023. For her work, Gladstone won the Gotham Independent Film Award for Outstanding Lead Performance.

A standalone sequel, Jazzy, was released in February 2025.

== Plot ==
A grieving woman embarks on a road trip through the American Midwest after receiving an unexpected invitation to reunite with her estranged Oglala Lakota family.

== Cast ==
- Lily Gladstone as Tana
- Raymond Lee as Isaac
- Richard Ray Whitman as Grandpa August
- Lainey Bearkiller Shangreaux as Lainey
- Devin Shangreaux as Devin
- Jasmine Bearkiller Shangreaux as Jazzy

== Reception ==
On the review aggregator website Rotten Tomatoes, 92% of 50 critics' reviews are positive, with an average rating of 7.9/10. The website's consensus reads: "Lily Gladstone's outstanding performances powers The Unknown Country through some narrative drift to its ultimately profound destination." Metacritic, which uses a weighted average, assigned the film a score of 82 out of 100, based on 14 critics, indicating "universal acclaim".

=== Accolades ===
Award	Date of ceremony	Category	Recipient(s)	Result	Ref.
Gotham Independent Film Awards	November 27, 2023	Outstanding Lead Performance	Lily Gladstone	Won	
Denver International Film Festival	November 12, 2022	American Independent Award – Best Feature Film	The Unknown Country	Nominated	
Denver International Film Festival	November 12, 2022	Honorable Mention	The Unknown Country	Won	
South by Southwest	March 20, 2022	SXSW Adam Yauch Hörnblowér Award	The Unknown Country	Nominated	
Cinema Eye Honors	January 12, 2024	Heterodox Award	The Unknown Country	Nominated	
Americana Film Fest	March 15, 2023	Audience Award – Next	The Unknown Country	Nominated	
Montclair Film Festival	October 30, 2022	Future/Now	The Unknown Country	Nominated	
Hell's Half Mile Film & Music Festival	September 25, 2022	Jury Award – Best Feature	The Unknown Country	Won	
Hell's Half Mile Film & Music Festival	September 25, 2022	Outstanding Achievement in Editing	Vanara Taing	Won	
Champs-Élysées Film Festival	June 28, 2022	Longs métrages américains	The Unknown Country	Nominated	
Calgary International Film Festival	October 2, 2022	International Narrative Competition	The Unknown Country	Nominated	
