= Raymond Lee (actor) =

American actor (born 1987)

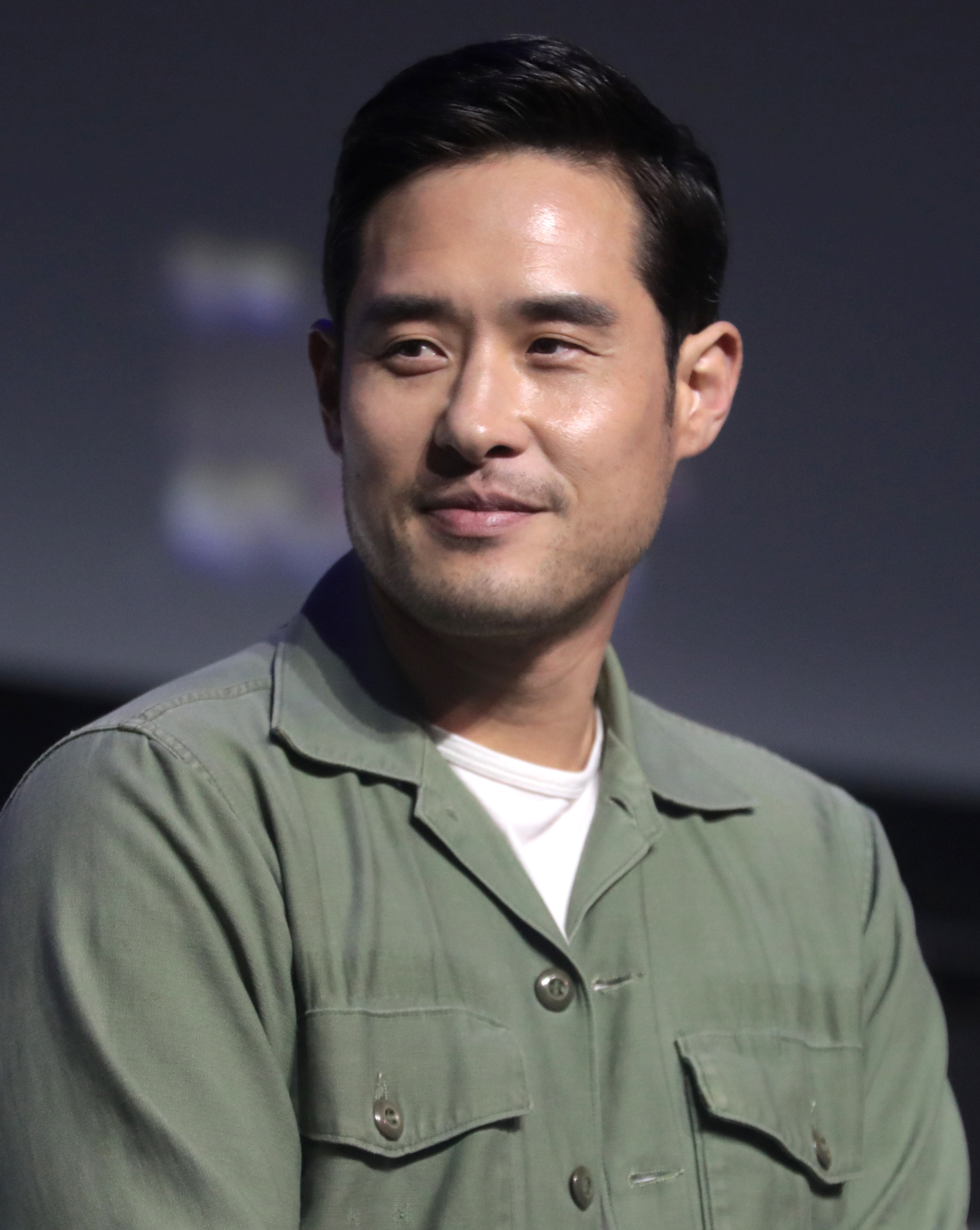
- Lee at the 2023 WonderCon
- Born: February 5, 1987 (age 39); New York City, U.S.
- Occupation: Actor
- Years active: 2009–present
- Spouse: Stacy Kusumolkul Lee
- Children: 2

Raymond Lee (born February 5, 1987) is an American actor. He is known for his roles as Arlen Lee in the Prime Video series Mozart in the Jungle and Duc Bayer-Boatwright in the HBO series Here and Now. In 2021, Lee was a series regular on the AMC series Kevin Can F**k Himself. From 2022 to 2024, Lee starred in the sequel/revival of the NBC science fiction drama Quantum Leap.

== Early life and education ==
Lee was born in New York City but moved to Los Angeles at a very young age. He is of South Korean descent. Although he originally studied kinesiology in college, Lee switched his major to acting at California State University, Long Beach. He co-founded the Four Clowns acting troupe.

== Career ==
His first major role was in the web series Ktown Cowboys where he appeared opposite Lanny Joon. He has appeared in minor roles in such television series as Scandal, Modern Family and It's Always Sunny in Philadelphia.

In 2016, he starred in Qui Nguyen's Vietgone at Manhattan Theatre Club. He won a Theatre World Award for his off-Broadway debut as Quang Nguyen, a Vietnamese refugee to the United States.

In 2022 he became the lead of Quantum Leap, the sequel to the cult classic 90s’ series. Lee was a fan of the original series. After the show was cancelled in 2024, he thanked fans and called it 'the role of a lifetime'.

== Personal life ==
Lee is married to Stacy Kusumolkul Lee; after working with Syrian refugees in 2016, she and a friend co-founded a charity called Dignity not Despair. As of October 2023, the couple have two toddlers, a daughter and a son.

== Filmography ==
=== Film ===
Year	Title	Role	Notes
2009	Penance	College Party Guy 2	
2011	Typhoon 360	Tian	
2012	Supercapitalist	Businessman	
2013	Farah Goes Bang	Nick	
2013	A Leading Man	Kelvin Kim	
2018	Fanny Price	Mr. Rushworth	
2019	VHYes	Todd Plotz	
2022	The Lost City	Officer Gomez	
2022	Top Gun: Maverick	Lt. Logan "Yale" Lee	
2022	trying	Danny	short film
2022	The Unknown Country	Isaac	
2024	Jazzy	Isaac	
TBA	Fanny Price †	Mr. Rushworth	short film, post-production

=== Television ===
Year	Title	Role	Notes
2012	How I Met Your Mother	College Dude	Episode: "The Stamp Tramp"
2013	Ben and Kate	Wonton Wok Delivery Person	Episode: "Bake-Off"
2013	Hart of Dixie	Andrew	Episode: "Why Don't We Get Drunk?"
2013	Zach Stone Is Gonna Be Famous	Henderson	Episode: "Zach Stone Is Gonna Get Wild"
2013	Sam & Cat	Fitch	Episode: "#TextingCompetition"
2013	It's Always Sunny in Philadelphia	Cashier	Episode: "The Gang Saves the Day"
2015	Jessie	Clifford	Episode: "Driving Miss Crazy"
2015	Nicky, Ricky, Dicky & Dawn	Ray	Episode: "Mall in the Family"
2016	Modern Family	Alan	Episode: "I Don't Know How She Does It"
2016	Scandal	Nelson Parker	2 episodes
2016	Mozart in the Jungle	Arlen Lee	4 episodes
2018	Here and Now	Duc Bayer-Boatwright	Main cast
2018	Magnum P.I.	James Chen	Episode: "Six Paintings, One Frame"
2019	Prodigal Son	Jin	3 episodes
2021–2022	Kevin Can F**k Himself	Sam	Main cast
2021–2022	Made for Love	Keefus / Jeff	Recurring role
2022–2024	Quantum Leap	Dr. Ben Song	Lead role
2026	Maximum Pleasure Guaranteed	Steve	6 episodes
2026	Sugar	Ji Moon	Main cast

=== Theatre ===
Year	Title	Role	Venue
2013	Hannah and the Dread Gazebo		East West Players; Los Angeles, CA
2016	Office Hour	Dennis	South Coast Repertory; Costa Mesa, CA
2016	Tokyo Fish Story	Nobu	Old Globe Theatre; San Diego, CA
2017	Vietgone	Quang Nguyen	Manhattan Theatre Club; New York City, NY

== Awards ==
- 2011 Top of Fringe Award, Best World Premiere Award and Best Physical Theater Award at the Hollywood Fringe Festival
- 2017 Theatre World Award for Vietgone
