= Under the Bridge (TV series) =

American TV series

- Genre: True crime; Drama
- Based on: Under the Bridge by Rebecca Godfrey (Note: The series is also inspired by the book Reena: A Father's Story by Manjit Virk.)
- Developed by: Quinn Shephard
- Starring: Lily Gladstone; Vritika Gupta; Chloe Guidry; Javon "Wanna" Walton; Izzy G; Aiyana Goodfellow; Ezra Faroque Khan; Archie Panjabi; Riley Keough
- Music by: Alex Somers
- Country of origin: United States
- Original language: English
- No. of episodes: 8

Production
- Executive producers: Samir Mehta; Quinn Shephard; Liz Tigelaar; Stacey Silverman; Riley Keough; Gina Gammell; Tara Duncan; Rebecca Godfrey; Geeta Vasant Patel
- Producer: Jan Peter Meyboom
- Cinematography: Checco Varese; C. Kim Miles; Minka Farthing-Kohl
- Editors: Justin Li; Tyler L. Cook; Sabrina Pitre; Kye Meechan; Kyle Reiter
- Running time: 35–47 minutes
- Production companies: Best Day Ever Productions; ABC Signature

Original release
- Network: Hulu
- Release: April 17 – May 29, 2024

Under the Bridge is an American true crime drama television miniseries developed by Quinn Shephard that is based upon the book of the same name by Rebecca Godfrey and inspired by the book Reena: A Father's Story by Manjit Virk.

The series premiered on Hulu on April 17, 2024 and received positive reviews from critics.

== Premise ==
Based on the tragic and true story of fourteen-year-old Reena Virk, who went to a party with friends but never came home. The show delves into the secret world of the young girls accused of the murder and reveals shocking facts about the improbable killer via the eyes of Rebecca Godfrey and a local police officer.

== Cast and characters ==
=== Main ===
- Lily Gladstone as Cam Bentland
- Vritika Gupta as Reena Virk
- Chloe Guidry as Josephine Bell (based on Nicole Cook)
- Javon "Wanna" Walton as Warren Glowatski
- Izzy G as Kelly Ellard
- Aiyana Goodfellow as Dusty Pace
- Ezra Faroque Khan as Manjit Virk
- Archie Panjabi as Suman Virk
- Riley Keough as Rebecca Godfrey

=== Recurring ===
- Anoop Desai as Raj Masihajjar
- Matt Craven as Roy Bentland
- Daniel Diemer as Scott Bentland
- Jared Ager-Foster as Connor Fields
- Maya da Costa as Maya Longette
- Arta Negahban as Laila Zahrani
- Isabella Leon as Samara Bailey

== Episodes ==
| No. | Title | Directed by | Written by | Original release date |
|---|---|---|---|---|
| 1 | "Looking Glass" | Geeta Vasant Patel | Quinn Shephard | April 17, 2024 |
In 1997, 14-year-old Reena Virk of Saanich, British Columbia rebels against her strict Indian-Canadian family, who are also Jehovah's Witnesses. She seeks friendship from a clique of fellow teen girls, who idolize gangsters and call themselves the CMC, for “Crips Mafia Cartel.” After the ringleader Josephine Bell ostracizes Reena, she steals Josephine’s phone book and uses it to spread insulting rumors about Josephine. In retaliation, the CMC assaults Reena under a bridge. Reena’s family reports her missing. However, she has run away before and only Officer Cam Bentland takes the situation seriously. Meanwhile, Rebecca Godfrey returns to British Columbia, after ten years in New York City. She plans to write a book about troubled girls in the area, and goes to the Seven Oaks Youth Home, where she meets Josephine and other CMC girls. She gives them her phone number for possible future interviews. Cam leads a police search and they find Reena’s underwear in the Gorge Waterway. The police bring in the CMC for questioning concerning a possible homicide. Josephine calls Rebecca, who comes to the precinct and pretends to be her guardian.
| 2 | "The John Gotti of Seven Oaks" | Kevin Phillips | Ashley Cardiff | April 17, 2024 |
The police discover, via surveillance footage, that Reena survived the assault and is now assumed alive. They release all the teens from police custody. Josephine and Rebecca make a deal for Josephine to take her to the bridge and explain what happened. Cam visits Rebecca to ask what she knows, but Rebecca reveals no information. In flashbacks, Reena clashes with her strict mother Suman, and shoplifts with Josephine. In the present, Josephine and another CMC girl, Dusty Pace, take Rebecca to the bridge. Josephine claims that, after the initial assault, she followed Reena and pushed her over the bridge’s railing. Dusty and Rebecca are horrified. Down river, Reena’s body is discovered in the Portage Inlet. Cam questions Dusty, who confesses what Josephine said about pushing Reena. Manjit, Reena’s father, learns that a criminal record of his has been expunged. Josephine takes Rebecca to a party, where the television announces that Reena’s body has been found. Josephine appears to be shocked by the news.
| 3 | "Blood Oath" | Catherine Hardwicke | Jihan Crowther | April 24, 2024 |
Rebecca tells Cam that Josephine took credit for killing Reena. Cam counters that Josephine has an alibi because she had signed into Seven Oaks by the midnight curfew, about the time Reena was killed. Rebecca confronts Josephine, who insists Reena is only dead because she planned it. A vigil is held at Reena’s school, where Rebecca meets Reena’s uncle, Raj. Rebecca and Cam go out for drinks, dance, and have sex. During a flashback, Reena continues to rebel, and Manjit invites her friends to dinner to make peace. In the present, Cam discovers Manjit’s expunged criminal record and gets Rebecca to ask Raj about it. Samara Bailey suspects that her boyfriend, Warren Glowatski, had something to do with Reena’s murder. He plays her the song “187 He Wrote” by Spice 1, which includes the lyrics “me say the murder the murder he wrote,” as an indirect confession. Josephine is surprised to find Reena’s muddy Steve Madden boots in her closet. CMC member Kelly Ellard says she “did it” for Josephine.
| 4 | "Beautiful British Columbia" | Nimisha Mukerji | Stuti Malhotra | May 1, 2024 |
Two timelines intercut during the episode. The first set of flashbacks begins with Reena's grandparents moving to Canada in 1951, where Suman is born. They are victims of xenophobia, but the family finds acceptance among the Jehovah’s Witnesses. When Suman is a young adult, she meets Manjit while he is visiting from India. Though they are both Punjabis, Suman’s parents don’t approve since Manjit is a Sikh and might be using Suman to get permanent residency. Despite this, he declares his love, converts, and they marry. In the second set of flashbacks, Josephine, Kelly, and Dusty come to dinner at Reena’s house. Manjit attempts to talk to Josephine about her broken family, which enrages her. After the girls leave, two things are missing: Reena’s bird, Smooch, and Suman’s heirloom earrings. The next day, Reena tells the girls she isn’t allowed to hang out with them anymore. In turn, Josephine convinces Reena to lie about her homelife so she can live at Seven Oaks. Smooch returns home. Manjit is arrested after Reena accuses him of beating and sexually molesting her.
| 5 | "When the Heat Comes Down" | Quinn Shephard | Tom Hanada | May 8, 2024 |
Kelly reveals that she killed Reena to Josephine and Dusty. Reena’s funeral is held, and Cam speaks to the media in an attempt to scare witnesses into coming forward. Rebecca offers to help Cam by pretending to be an ally to the CMC. The police find violent drawings in Kelly’s school locker. The girls take Rebecca to a local gang of boys (who think of themselves as Crips). To prove she’s not a cop, Rebecca takes LSD with Warren. While high, she tells him that her brother, Gabe, drowned in the ocean. Warren confesses that he witnessed Kelly killing Reena. Josephine, Kelly, and Dusty call the police to report that Warren acted alone. Dusty wants to make amends with her older sister, but she is rejected. Cam tries to get Dusty to talk, but she insists the killer is Warren. When Kelly brags about standing on Reena's neck, Dusty attacks her. Josephine and Kelly worry Dusty may eventually crack under the pressure. In flashbacks, Reena’s lies lead her parents to no longer trust her.
| 6 | "In Water, They Sink as the Same" | Quinn Shephard | Quinn Shephard & Samir Mehta | May 15, 2024 |
When Rebecca was 13 years old, she was cruel to Gabe just before he fell into the ocean and drowned. In the present, Rebecca tells Cam that Warren witnessed Reena’s murder. Cam informs her that Warren has been accused of the murder and there is a warrant for his arrest. Rebecca tries to hide Warren in her parents' house, but he eventually leaves. In a flashback, Reena’s lies are uncovered at Seven Oaks, so she is sent to live with her grandparents. She decides to steal Josephine’s phone book in retaliation for convincing her to lie about being abused. In the present, Josephine and Kelly plan to kill Dusty, but Josephine has a change of heart and saves Dusty before a train hits her. Cam and her father, Chief of Police Roy Bentland, question Samara, who reveals Warren told her that both he and Kelly dragged Reena into the water. The police arrest the CMC, including Warren. Rebecca tries to excuse his crimes, and Cam accuses her of treating the murder as simply material for her book.
| 7 | "Three and Seven" | Dinh Thai | Todd Crittenden | May 22, 2024 |
The CMC teens, who were involved in the first assault against Reena, are sentenced to a year in a juvenile detention center. Kelly and Warren will stand trial for murder. Samara has moved and will not return as a witness. Dusty faces perjuring herself if she testifies. Therefore, Cam puts her career on the line to keep Dusty off the stand. Rebecca meets with Manjit and Suman to learn about who Reena was as a person. However, Rebecca can’t let go of her sympathies for Warren. At his trial, Warren admits to having participated in the first assault. He also testifies that he neither intervened nor participated when Kelly killed Reena. The judge believes Warren bears more responsibility than he claims and finds him guilty of second-degree murder. Warren is sentenced to life imprisonment with the possibility of parole. After Kelly provokes another girl into hitting her, she claims her life is at risk while incarcerated. As a result, she is allowed to return home until her trial.
| 8 | "Mercy Alone" | Kevin Phillips | Samir Mehta | May 29, 2024 |
Kelly’s trial gets underway. CMC members Dusty, Laila, and Maya testify against her, but Josephine refuses to do so. Rebecca encourages Warren to testify. He meets with Suman, who explains that her faith encourages mercy, and she forgives him. Warren testifies, admitting that he and Kelly beat up Reena before Kelly drowned her. Kelly takes the stand and vehemently denies killing Reena. She is found guilty and given the minimum sentence of 5 years imprisonment. Rebecca worries that Gabe’s death was a suicide. Cam insists that it wasn’t Rebecca’s fault. She returns to New York to publish her book. Cam learns that she was part of the Adopt Indian Métis Program and was forcibly taken from her birth family. She seeks them out to reconnect. Suman and Manjit sit in Reena’s room and sense her presence. The epilogue explains that the Virks became anti-bullying activists. Suman died in 2018. Rebecca died in 2022. Warren was released on parole in 2010. Kelly appealed her case and was given a life sentence. She confessed to murdering Reena in 2016. Shortly afterwards, she was granted day parole.

== Production ==
=== Development ===
In September 2022, Hulu gave the series an 8-episode order, with Samir Mehta and Liz Tigelaar set to executive produce, with Quinn Shephard adapting the book of the same name by Rebecca Godfrey.

=== Casting ===
In December 2022, Riley Keough, Izzy G, Chloe Guidry, Ezra Faroque Khan, Archie Panjabi, Vritika Gupta, Javon Walton, Aiyana Goodfellow and Lily Gladstone joined the cast of the series, in series regular capacity.

=== Filming ===
Principal photography took place in Vancouver, BC from December 2022 to May 2023.

== Reception ==
=== Viewership ===
According to Whip Media's TV Time, Under the Bridge was the ninth most streamed original television series across all platforms in the United States during the week of April 21, and the seventh during the week of April 28, 2024. The streaming aggregator JustWatch reported the show was the fourth most streamed television series across all platforms in the United States between April 22–28, 2024.

=== Critical response ===
The review aggregator website Rotten Tomatoes reported an 87% approval rating with an average rating of 7.4/10, based on 60 critic reviews. The website's critics consensus reads, "Unraveling a brutal mystery with a sensitive touch, Under the Bridge occasionally glosses over its most interesting elements but excels as an exploration of cruelty." Metacritic, which uses a weighted average, assigned a score of 70 out of 100 based on 28 critics, indicating "generally favorable" reviews.

== Accolades ==
| Award | Date of ceremony | Category | Nominee(s) | Result | Ref. |
|---|---|---|---|---|---|
| Gotham TV Awards | June 4, 2024 | Breakthrough Limited Series | Under the Bridge | Nominated | |
| Gotham TV Awards | June 4, 2024 | Outstanding Performance in a Limited Series | Lily Gladstone | Nominated | |
| Astra TV Awards | August 18, 2024 | Best Supporting Actress in a Limited Series or TV Movie | Lily Gladstone | Nominated | |
| Astra TV Awards | August 18, 2024 | Best Supporting Actress in a Limited Series or TV Movie | Riley Keough | Nominated | |
| Primetime Emmy Awards | September 15, 2024 | Outstanding Supporting Actress in a Limited or Anthology Series or Movie | Lily Gladstone | Nominated | |
| Screen Actors Guild Awards | February 23, 2025 | Outstanding Performance by a Female Actor in a Miniseries or Television Movie | Lily Gladstone | Nominated | |
