= 1st Gotham TV Awards =

2024 American television programming awards

- Date: June 4, 2024
- Location: Cipriani 25 Broadway, New York City
- Country: United States
- Presented by: The Gotham Film & Media Institute

Highlights
- Most wins: Colin from Accounts (2)
- Most nominations: Bodkin / The Curse / Shōgun (3)
- Comedy Series: Colin from Accounts
- Drama Series: Mr. & Mrs. Smith
- Limited Series: Baby Reindeer

The 1st Gotham TV Awards (also known as the 2024 Gotham TV Awards), presented by the Gotham Film & Media Institute, were held at Cipriani 25 Broadway in New York City on June 4, 2024.

The nominations were announced on May 14, 2024.

== Winners and nominees ==
=== Programs ===
Breakthrough Comedy Series: Colin from Accounts (Paramount+); Bodkin (Netflix); Gen V (Amazon Prime Video)	Breakthrough Drama Series: Mr. & Mrs. Smith (Amazon Prime Video); Black Cake (Hulu); The Curse (Showtime); Fallout (Amazon Prime Video); X-Men '97 (Disney+)
Breakthrough Limited Series: Baby Reindeer (Netflix); Ripley (Netflix); Shōgun (FX / FX on Hulu); The Sympathizer (HBO / Max); Under the Bridge (Hulu)	Breakthrough Nonfiction Series: Jerrod Carmichael Reality Show (HBO / Max); Black Twitter: A People's History (Hulu); Life on Our Planet (Netflix); Murder in Boston: Roots, Rampage, and Reckoning (HBO / Max); Stax: Soulsville U.S.A. (HBO / Max)

=== Performance ===
Outstanding Performance in a Comedy Series
- Harriet Dyer – Colin from Accounts as Ashley (Paramount+)
  - Robyn Cara – Bodkin as Emmy Sizergh (Netflix)
  - Siobhán Cullen – Bodkin as Dove Maloney (Netflix)
  - Kaya Scodelario – The Gentlemen as Susan "Susie" Glass (Netflix)
  - Jaz Sinclair – Gen V as Marie Moreau (Amazon Prime Video)
  - Kristen Wiig – Palm Royale as Maxine Dellacorte-Simmons (Apple TV+)
Outstanding Performance in a Drama Series
- Zine Tseng – 3 Body Problem as Young Ye Wenjie (Netflix)
  - Nathan Fielder – The Curse as Asher Siegel (Showtime)
  - Walton Goggins – Fallout as the Ghoul / Cooper Howard (Amazon Prime Video)
  - Mia Isaac – Black Cake as Coventina "Covey" Lyncook (Hulu)
  - Emma Stone – The Curse as Whitney Siegel (Showtime)
Outstanding Performance in a Limited Series
- Andrew Scott – Ripley as Tom Ripley (Netflix)
  - Richard Gadd – Baby Reindeer as Donny Dunn (Netflix)
  - Lily Gladstone – Under the Bridge as Cam Bentland (Hulu)
  - Ambika Mod – One Day as Emma Morley (Netflix)
  - Tobias Menzies – Manhunt as Edwin Stanton (Apple TV+)
  - Andrea Riseborough – The Regime as Agnes (HBO / Max)
  - Hiroyuki Sanada – Shōgun as Lord Yoshii Toranaga (FX / FX on Hulu)
  - Anna Sawai – Shōgun as Toda Mariko (FX / FX on Hulu)
  - Hoa Xuande – The Sympathizer as The Captain (HBO / Max)
  - Ji-young Yoo – Expats as Mercy Cho (Amazon Prime Video)

== Special awards ==
=== Creator Tribute ===
- Peter Morgan

=== Spotlight Tribute ===
- Lulu Wang

=== Anniversary Tribute ===
- Mariska Hargitay

== Series with multiple wins and nominations ==
Series that received multiple wins
Wins	Series	Platform
2	Colin from Accounts	Paramount+

Series that received multiple nominations
Nominations	Series	Network(s) / Platform(s)
3	Bodkin	Netflix
3	The Curse	Showtime
3	Shōgun	FX / FX on Hulu
2	Baby Reindeer	Netflix
2	Black Cake	Hulu
2	Colin from Accounts	Paramount+
2	Fallout	Amazon Prime Video
2	Gen V	Amazon Prime Video
2	Ripley	Netflix
2	The Sympathizer	HBO / Max
2	Under the Bridge	Hulu

== See also ==
- 40th TCA Awards
- 4th Astra TV Awards
- 76th Primetime Emmy Awards
