= Red Skies of Montana =

1952 film

- Directed by: Joseph M. Newman
- Screenplay by: Harry Kleiner
- Story by: Art Cohen
- Based on: Fire by George R. Stewart
- Produced by: Samuel G. Engel
- Starring: Richard Widmark; Constance Smith; Jeffrey Hunter; Richard Boone
- Cinematography: Charles G. Clarke
- Edited by: William Reynolds
- Music by: Sol Kaplan
- Production company: 20th Century Fox
- Distributed by: 20th Century Fox
- Release date: January 20, 1952
- Running time: 99 minutes
- Country: United States
- Language: English
- Box office: $1.25 million (US rentals)

Red Skies of Montana is a 1952 American adventure drama film directed by Joseph M. Newman and starring Richard Widmark, Constance Smith and Jeffrey Hunter. Widmark stars as a smokejumper who attempts to save his crew while being overrun by a forest fire, not only to preserve their lives, but to redeem himself after being the only survivor of a previous disaster.

The film was loosely based on the August 1949 Mann Gulch fire, and filmed on location in Technicolor with the cooperation of the United States Forest Service.

Bugle Mountain (also known as "Bugle Peak"), located in the Scapegoat Wilderness near Lincoln, Montana, gave its name to the fictional setting of the forest fire in the Selway National Forest shown during the first 30 minutes of the film.

== Plot ==
Cliff Mason, a veteran foreman of the Forest Service's smokejumper unit, is called out with a crew on a fire, despite the fact that they have not rested in three days. Accompanied by R. A. "Pop" Miller and four other men, Cliff leaves the smokejumper base at Missoula, Montana to parachute into a nearly inaccessible area of Bugle Peak.

Hours later, at base, superintendent Richard "Dick" Dryer becomes worried because Cliff is not answering radio calls.

The next day, after the fire crowns, Dick flies by helicopter into the area and is stunned to find only Cliff, in shock and wandering through the devastated region. Cliff is rushed to the hospital, where he gradually recovers, although he cannot remember how he got separated from his men, or why he was the only one to survive.

Upon his return home, Cliff is greeted by Pop's son Ed, who is also a smokejumper. Ed expresses genuine concern for Cliff, but Cliff, sensitive about his lack of memory and worried that he might be responsible for his crew's deaths, becomes antagonistic.

A board of review conducts a hearing into the matter, and Cliff grows increasingly defensive after several grueling days of repetitious questioning. Cliff's paranoia grows that he might be thought a coward who deserted his men despite the assurances of his devoted wife Peg and Dick, who lets him return to work only as supervisor of training.

Ed continues to grill Cliff, asking him how he might have come to be in the protected rock slide area that was the only possible place of survival when the bodies of his crew were found on an exposed ridge across the valley. Ed's suspicions escalate and Cliff reacts even more bitterly. One night, an emergency crew is called out to repair downed transmission lines, and when Cliff's longtime friend Boise Peterson is shocked by a live wire, Cliff saves him. Ed pointedly remarks that it was not necessary for Cliff to prove his bravery. Cliff is cleared by the board of review but confides to Peg that he is plagued by doubts about his courage. Later, Dick shows Ed a watch, mistakenly sent to another man's family, that Ed recognizes as his father's. Upset again, Ed confronts Cliff with the watch, and jogs his memory.

Cliff recalls that when the fire began to race along the treetops, all of them had reached the rockslide where he urged them to lie down in the crevices. However a burning snag fell on the rockslide and the crew continued running. Cliff attempted to stop Pop, pulling off his watch and ID tag as they grappled, but Pop knocked him into a crevice that protected Cliff from the worst of the fire. Ed furiously accuses Cliff of deserting his men and goes AWOL, parachuting from a private airplane onto Bugle Peak, where he finds Pop's identification bracelet on the ridge, not on the rockslide, where Cliff says he saw Pop last. Believing he has obtained proof that Cliff abandoned his men on the ridge, Ed returns to base, only to discover that Cliff and another team of men have been sent to fight a fire in Carson Canyon. Confronting Dick with the ID tag, Ed accuses Cliff of killing his father, and Dick fires him from the smokejumper unit for going AWOL on a personal grudge. In Carson Canyon, Cliff's crew brings the fire under control but weather conditions threaten a re-burn, prompting Cliff to request more men and equipment.

Ed joins the smokejumper reinforcements without authorization and at Carson Canyon tracks down Cliff, scouting the fire that now has them trapped. After losing his head and trying to kill Cliff with the axe end of his Pulaski, Ed breaks his leg when he tumbles down a slope as they fight. Cliff returns to the crew's anchor point to organize the men, sending three with heavier equipment to bring in Ed. Cliff orders the others to dig foxholes, knowing that burying themselves and allowing the fire to pass over them is their only hope for survival. The men protest but grudgingly comply when Cliff insists. Ed is surprised to discover that Cliff is responsible for his rescue, and when he is brought back to the anchor point, the crew panics and starts to flee. Ed sees Cliff knock down Boise to quell the panic and realizes Cliff was telling the truth about Bugle Peak.

After the fire has passed, all of the smokejumpers have survived and Ed, reconciling with Cliff, sheepishly grins and asks for a cigarette, inspiring Boise to do the same. When Dick realizes the entire crew has survived, he reinforces Cliff's men from the air as an even larger ground force with bulldozers swings into action.

== Cast ==
- Richard Widmark as Cliff Mason
- Constance Smith as Peg Mason
- Jeffrey Hunter as Edward "Ed" J. Miller
- Richard Boone as Richard "Dick" Dryer
- Warren Stevens as Steve Burgess
- James Griffith as Boise Peterson
- Joe Sawyer as R.A. "Pop" Miller
- Richard Crenna as Noxon (uncredited)
- Charles Bronson as Neff (uncredited)

== Production ==
=== Novel ===
The film was based on the novel Fire by George R. Stewart, who had written a number of books about the U.S. Fire Service. The novel was published in 1948. The New York Times called it "unforgettable". The Los Angeles Times called it a "triumph".

=== Development ===
In August 1948 20th Century Fox announced it bought the rights as a film for Linda Darnell with Sam Engel to produce. Wanda Tuchock was writing the script. In July 1950 Fox announced the film would star Dana Andrews and be based on a script by Harry Kleiner. Filming was to start the following month in Helena National Park. Later that month the project was called Fire Devils and Hell Fire. The director was meant to be Louis King, brother of Henry, making his directorial debut. The cast included Richard Widmark, Dana Andrews, and Jean Peters. Andrews had to make a film at RKO and was replaced by John Lund. Widmark dropped out to appear in The Frogmen and was replaced by Victor Mature.

=== Filming ===
The picture began production in Missoula in September with Louis King directing. By this stage the working title was Wild Fire or Wild Winds.

Mature was injured in a motorcycle accident during filming. After Lund was stung by a wasp and the location was snowed in, filming was stopped. In April 1951, it was reported that the screenplay was going to be rewritten and that Glenn Ford was going to be the star. The revision incorporated elements from the Mann Gulch fire.

In May 1951 Fox announced the film would be produced by Sam Engel under a seven-year contract that the producer had with the studio and would star Richard Widmark, Victor Mature, and Helen Westcott. Harry Kleiner rewrote the script. Filming resumed June 22 with Widmark and Richard Boone starring and Jeffrey Hunter in the part originally written for Victor Mature. Constance Smith was invited from England to play the female lead.

According to a news item in the July 6, 1951, edition of the Hollywood Reporter, footage of a fire in the Gila National Forest, New Mexico, was filmed by a special camera crew for use in the film.

The aircraft in the smoke jumping scenes (NC8419) was a Ford Trimotor 5-AT-C used by the United States Forest Service in its operations. The aircraft was used by the USFS from June 5, 1951, to August 4, 1959, when it crashed and burned while landing at the Moose Creek spike camp airstrip in the Selway-Bitterroot Wilderness in Idaho, 50 miles west of Missoula, killing two smokejumpers and a Nez Perce National Forest supervisor.

Fire sequences were shot near Lake Arrowhead. Filming finished by August 1951.

== Television adaptation ==
A one-hour television adaptation for The 20th Century Fox Hour entitled Smoke Jumpers was broadcast in November 1956. The telefilm was directed by Albert S. Rogell and starred Dan Duryea, Dean Jagger, and Joan Leslie. The New York Times said the show "had unfortunate melodramatic touches".

== See also ==
- List of firefighting films
