= Chipo Chung =

Zimbabwean actress (born 1977)

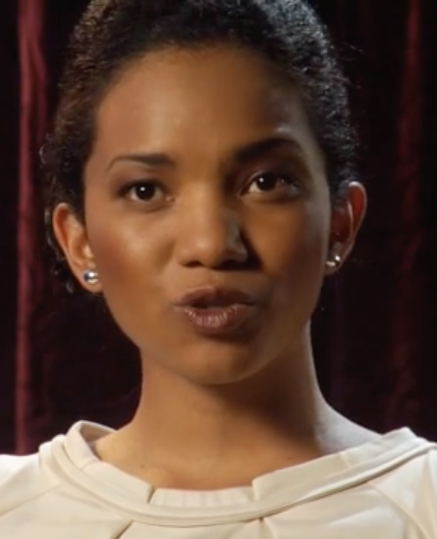
- Chung in 2008
- Born: Chipo Tariro Chung; 17 August 1977 (age 49); Dar es Salaam, Tanzania
- Education: Yale University (BA); Royal Academy of Dramatic Art (BA)
- Occupations: Actress; activist
- Years active: 2003–present
- Parents: Rugare Gumbo (father); Fay Chung (mother)

Chipo Tariro Chung (born 17 August 1977) is a Zimbabwean actress and activist based in London.

== Early life and education ==
Chung was born as a refugee in Dar es Salaam, Tanzania. Her given name Chipo means "gift" in the Shona language. She spent her first two years in refugee camps in Mozambique with thousands of young people who were escaping the war in then-Rhodesia.

Chung was raised in Harare, where she attended Dominican Convent High School and developed her acting with the mixed-race theater company Over the Edge. At eighteen, she moved to the United States, where her mother, educationist and former minister of education in Zimbabwe Fay Chung (who is of Chinese heritage), was working for the United Nations.

Chung first studied directing at Yale University and then trained as an actor at the Royal Academy of Dramatic Art (RADA) in London, graduating in 2003.

== Career ==
Chung's stage debut was as Ophelia in a Nuffield Theatre production of Hamlet. Appearances in The Mayor of Zalamea and Ma Rainey's Black Bottom at the Liverpool Everyman and Playhouse followed. She then appeared in Talking to Terrorists (Royal Court Theatre), The Overwhelming (Royal National Theatre) and Fallujah (in which she played Condoleezza Rice), as well as classical plays including Phedre, which was the first National Theatre Live recording, and starred Helen Mirren.

Chung has appeared twice in Doctor Who, in one episode playing the Master's assistant Chantho in the series 3 episode "Utopia", and a character called the Fortune Teller in series 4’s "Turn Left". Her first film credit was as the voice of Icarus II in Danny Boyle's Sunshine (2007). Other television appearances include in the drama The Last Enemy and as a reporter in the Sherlock second series episode "The Hounds of Baskerville".

In 2011, she had a recurring role in the medieval romance drama series Camelot as Vivian, an indentured servant at King Uther's court who then works as an attendant and messenger for Morgan le Fay, played by Eva Green. Chung appeared in the first season of Sky Atlantic series Fortitude as Trish Stoddart, before winning the role of Mary Magdalene in the TV series, A.D. The Bible Continues. The show was hailed for its international and multiracial casting and opened to 11 million viewers in April 2015.

Chung then featured as the Master in AMC's post-apocalyptic kung fu series Into the Badlands.

In 2017, Chung played Portia and Octavius in the Sheffield Theatre production of Julius Caesar, before taking on the title role of Dido, Queen of Carthage in the Royal Shakespeare Company's premiere production of Christopher Marlowe's tragedy. Michael Billington wrote in The Guardian that she "plays [Dido] with a volatility and sense of contradiction that anticipates Shakespeare's Cleopatra".

In 2021, Chung joined the cast of BBC/HBO co-production His Dark Materials playing the angel Xaphania. She features in a number of Apple TV+ series including Foundation and Silo. In 2022, it was announced that she would be playing Eleanor Bennett in the Hulu series Black Cake, based on the best-selling novel by Charmaine Wilkerson. The series is produced by Oprah Winfrey's Harpo Films and Aaron Kaplan's Kapital Entertainment.

Chung reads a number of titles on Audible, most notably the novel Glory by NoViolet Bulawayo, which was a 2022 finalist for the Booker Prize, as well as books by Petina Gappah and Tsitsi Dangarembgwa.

Chung was recognized as one of the BBC's 100 women of 2014. She was nominated for Best Actress at the Zimbabwe International Women's Awards (ZIWA) in 2015 and honoured with a Special Recognition Award for her contribution to Media and the Arts at the Zimbabwe Achievers Awards in London in 2017.

== Activism ==
Chung co-founded the charity SAFE-Kenya which develops theatre for social change in Kenya, focusing on HIV education and abandoning clitoridectomy. She worked closely with the charity Peace Direct to start Envision Zimbabwe, a women's trust that works towards consensus-building and peace in Zimbabwe. She also sits on the RADA Council and British Equity's International Committee for Artists' Freedom (ICAF).

In December 2019, along with 42 other cultural figures, Chung signed a letter endorsing the Labour Party under Jeremy Corbyn's leadership in the 2019 general election. The letter stated that "Labour's election manifesto under Jeremy Corbyn's leadership offers a transformative plan that prioritises the needs of people and the planet over private profit and the vested interests of a few."

In 2020, Chung co-chaired British Equity's Independent Commission on Race Equality, and in 2022 founded the British charity Partnership on Rape Aftercare (PORA), which supports the Adult Rape Clinic in Zimbabwe.

== Filmography ==
=== Mobile App ===
Year	Title	Role	Notes
2017	Deep Time Walk	The Scientist	

=== Film ===
Year	Title	Role	Notes
2005	Proof	University Friend	
2007	Sunshine	Icarus II (voice)	
2009	In the Loop	Annabelle Hsin	
2011	360	Editor	
2012	Labalaba, He'll Return	Atika	Short film
2013	Red Zone	Starling (voice)	Short film
2014	Beyond Plain Sight	Agnes Takahata	Short film
2018	Thomas & Friends: Big World! Big Adventures!	African Troublesome Trucks, Various African Characters (voice)	UK & US versions

=== Television ===
Year	Title	Role	Notes
2003	Absolute Power	Miriam	Episode: "History Man"
2007	Dalziel and Pascoe	Layla Jadwin	2 episodes
2007–2008	Doctor Who	Chantho, Fortune Teller	Episodes "Utopia" & "Turn Left"
2007	Holby City	Dr. Nicola Wood	Episode: "Past Imperfect"
2008	The Last Enemy	Lucy Fox	2 episodes
2009	Casualty	Dan Dan	Episode: "Who Do You Think You Are?"
2009	National Theatre Live	Ismene	Episode: "Phédre"
2010	Identity	Michelle Fielding	Episode: "Second Life"
2011	Camelot	Vivian	8 episodes
2012	Sherlock	Presenter	Episode: "The Hounds of Baskerville"
2015	Fortitude	Trish Stoddart	5 episodes
2015	A.D. The Bible Continues	Mary Magdalene	12 episodes
2015	From Darkness	Jemima Greer	Episode: "Episode #1.2"
2016	Thirteen	Alia Symes	3 episodes
2017	Absentia	Agent Whitman	7 episodes
2017–2019	Into the Badlands	The Master	14 episodes
2018	Thomas & Friends	Hong-Mei, African Trucks	UK/US voice
2021	Foundation	Simulation Instructor	2 episodes
2022	His Dark Materials	Xaphania	Main role
2023–2026	Silo	Sandy	Main role
2023	Black Cake	Eleanor Bennett	8 episodes
2024	Constellation	Michaela Moyone	5 episodes

=== Video games ===
Year	Title	Role	Notes
2017	Hellblade: Senua's Sacrifice	Narrator	
