= Earth Abides =

1949 novel by George Rippey Stewart

- Cover of the 1949 Random House first edition
- Author: George R. Stewart
- Cover artist: H. Lawrence Hoffman
- Language: English
- Genre: Science fiction
- Publisher: Random House
- Publication date: 1949
- Publication place: United States
- Media type: Print (hardcover)
- Pages: 373
- ISBN: 978-0345487131
- OCLC: 2205195

Earth Abides is a 1949 American post-apocalyptic science fiction novel by George R. Stewart. It tells the story of the fall of civilization from deadly disease and the emergence of a new culture with simpler tools. Set in the 1940s in Berkeley, California, the story is told by Isherwood Williams, who emerges from isolation in the mountains only to discover that almost everyone has died.

Earth Abides won the inaugural International Fantasy Award in 1951. It was included in Locus magazine's list of best All Time Science Fiction in 1987 and 1998 and was a nominee to be entered into the Prometheus Hall of Fame some time before 2002.

== Plot ==
=== "Part I: World Without End" ===
While working on his graduate thesis in geography in the Sierra Nevada, Ish is bitten by a rattlesnake. As he heals from the bite in a cabin, he gets sick with a disease similar to measles, and he lapses in and out of consciousness. He eventually recovers and makes his way back to civilization, only to discover that it has collapsed after most people have died from the same disease. He decides to go to his home in Berkeley, California. In the city near his home, Ish meets a few survivors and also encounters a friendly and eager dog, which he names Princess, who swiftly adopts Ish as her new master. He sets out on a cross-country tour, traveling all the way to New York City and back, scavenging for food and fuel as he goes. As he travels, he finds small groups of survivors, but has doubts about humanity's ability to survive the loss of civilization.

Ish returns to his home in California. After reading Ecclesiastes, he realizes that he had been throwing his life away. He finds an African American woman named Emma living nearby, and they agree to consider themselves married and have children. Other survivors gradually join them. Over time, the electricity (which had been provided by an automated hydro power station) fails, and the comforts of civilization recede. As the children grow, Ish tries to instill basic academic skills by teaching reading, writing, arithmetic, and geography, but he is unsuccessful mainly due to the others' lack of interest.

Many children are born in these years, including Joey, Ish's youngest and favorite son. Joey is very similar in nature to Ish, as he demonstrates innate intelligence and a curiosity about the world before the epidemic. This leads Ish to believe that Joey is the key to the future.

=== "Part II: The Year 22" ===
22 years after the collapse, the community is flourishing, with the young adapting easily to the de-modernised world. They come to have a better grasp of the natural world than the adults, and when running water fails, the younger generation comes to the rescue, knowing where flowing streams may be found. Ish turns his attention from ecology to his newly forming society, and he notices that the children are becoming very superstitious. One day, Ish asks for his hammer, which he habitually carries around, and finds the children are afraid to touch it as it is a symbol to them of the old times; the long-dead "Americans" of the old world are now viewed like gods, including Ish. Only Joey is willing to touch the hammer, confirming in Ish's mind that he is the future of civilization.

Two of the older boys return from a cross-country trip with a stranger named Charlie, whom Ish and the other adults immediately distrust. When it is discovered that Charlie carries multiple dangerous diseases, Ish and the other survivors vote to execute him to prevent transmission. Shortly after Charlie's arrival, the tribe experiences an outbreak of typhoid fever, which kills many, including Joey. Through his despair, Ish is compelled to confront the future with a new set of expectations and hopes. His ambition to restore civilization to its original state is replaced by a more modest, practical one: to convey a few basic survival skills, such as making bows and arrows, which the children find to be excellent playthings.

As the years go by, the community begins to grow corn. Ish presides at meetings, his hammer being a symbol of his status. Though he is respected, many of his ideas are ignored by the younger men. Decades pass, and every original member of the tribe dies except Ish, leaving him as "the Last American".

=== "Part III: The Last American" ===
Ish spends most of his elderly life in a mental "fog", unaware of the world. Occasionally, the fog in his mind lifts. During one such time, he finds himself aware of his great-grandson, Jack, who stands before him. Jack tells him that the bow and arrow have become more reliable than the gun, whose cartridges do not always work. Jack also mentions that the differently colored arrowheads that he has made (unbeknownst to him, from several coin denominations) are suitable for hunting different game. Ish finds this belief superstitious, but decides it would be futile to challenge it. Ish realizes that the former civilization is now completely gone and will not be rebuilt anytime soon. He becomes reconciled to the way things have changed. After a fire destroys Ish's house and the surrounding city, Jack and some other men carry him and the hammer to safety. Ish collapses while crossing the San Francisco–Oakland Bay Bridge, and as he is dying the younger men insist that his hammer be passed on to one of them. Ish chooses Jack, then dies while recalling a passage from Ecclesiastes: "Men go and come, but Earth abides."

== Characters ==
Isherwood Williams (Ish) is a graduate student at Berkeley, studying the geography of an area in the mountains, somewhere in California. He is sometimes referred to in the book as "The Last American". Ish—due, he believes, to his intellect—becomes the leader of the community, or "the tribe".

Emma (Em) is a woman whom Isherwood meets in his hometown. The author may have been taking a chance with this character, who is, at least partially, African-American, while Isherwood is white; at the time when the book was written, interracial marriages were heavily discouraged in American society. Isherwood does marry her, and race is unimportant to the couple's relationship. Em becomes the community's mother, letting it grow as it will, but stepping in to help when no one else is filling the leadership role. She is the adult while others panic, and Ish thinks of her as the "Mother of Nations". In her old age, she disagrees with Ish about a request by a smaller community, known as the Others, to join the Tribe. Ish initially opposes the idea, but Em supports it, and Ish changes his mind.

Ezra meets Emma and Ish while traveling through Berkeley. He is a former liquor salesman and immigrant from Yorkshire, England. They like him, but fear the complications of a love triangle, so they encourage him to leave. He returns with Molly and Jean, his wives. Ish values Ezra as a good judge of people, saying "Ezra knew people, Ezra liked people."

George is a carpenter by trade. George is not intellectually gifted, but becomes a Jack-of-all-trades—able to build, repair or maintain the limited infrastructure of the small community.

Evie is a "half grown girl" whom Ezra found living "in squalor and solitude". She appears to have a mental illness, and the others all care and provide for her. Evie grows into an attractive young woman; but the tribe has a rule that as the children grow, no one will marry her—the reasons for this being that she wouldn't understand, and that her mental condition could possibly be hereditary.

Joey is the youngest son of Ish and Em. Though physically weak, he is the only child in the tribe who is truly interested in the academic skills that Ish tries to teach: geometry, reading, geography. He dies during the typhoid fever outbreak.

Charlie is a stranger who arrives from Los Angeles after two of the "boys" (the second generation) make a scouting expedition in a refurbished Jeep to see what is left of America. Immediately upon his arrival, Ish and Ezra become suspicious about Charlie and the type of person he might be. Their suspicions are confirmed a day later when Charlie sets his eye on Evie. He also reveals to Ezra after drinking heavily that he has had many of "Cupid's" diseases. Ish confronts Charlie about Evie, Charlie is disrespectful and challenges Ish's authority as leader. It is revealed that Charlie carries a concealed pistol and his behavior reveals himself as someone who may have been a violent criminal before the epidemic. As a result, Ish, Em, Ezra and George debate between killing or exiling Charlie for the safety of the community. They unanimously choose death, and Charlie is hanged. Charlie is the carrier of the typhoid epidemic that infects the community.

Jack is Ish's great-grandson. He is a young man who hunts with arrows he makes himself. Jack is confident, intelligent and a potential leader, and Ish sees something of Joey in him, although he has beliefs which to Ish seem superstitious and naive. Like others of his generation, Jack believes Ish's old hammer is something very important for the Tribe. He risks his life by going into a burning house to retrieve the hammer. Later, as Ish is dying, the young men want to know to whom the hammer will now belong, and Ish chooses Jack.

== Major themes ==
=== Biological controls on population ===
On the title page, Stewart immediately states the theme, quoting Ecclesiastes 1:4 — "Men go and come, but earth abides." The first half of Earth Abides has the major theme that humans have no privileged place in nature and are not immune to nature's built-in population controls. The main character, a geologist, states it plainly: "When anything gets too numerous it's likely to get hit by some plague".

On the first page, Stewart tells readers how contagion could bring the end very quickly for mankind:

"If a killing type of virus strain should suddenly arise by mutation... it could, because of the rapid transportation in which we indulge nowadays, be carried to the far corners of the earth and cause the deaths of millions of people." W. M. Stanley, in Chemical and Engineering News, December 22, 1947.

Within a few pages, he makes it clear that basic biology also applies to humans:

"Some zoologists have even suggested a biological law: that the number of individuals in a species never remains constant, but always rises and falls—the higher the animal and the slower its breeding-rate, the longer its period of fluctuation [...] As for man, there is little reason to think that he can in the long run escape the fate of other creatures, and if there is a biological law of flux and reflux, his situation is now a highly perilous one....Biologically, man has for too long a time been rolling an uninterrupted run of sevens."

=== Effects of smaller population ===
Reviewer Noel Perrin has pointed out that Stewart had previously written two books in which the main character was not a person, but "a natural force". In Storm the main character is weather, and in Fire, a forest fire takes center stage.

In the same way, Stewart centers the first half of Earth Abides on the forces of natural and artificial selection. In freeing the landscape from humans, half of the book is devoted to looking at how the world would change in their absence. Stewart chose to make his main human character an ecologist, and sends him on a cross-country tour, to see what the world is like without people. As animals and plants no longer have humans taking care of them or controlling them, they are free to breed uncontrolled and to prey upon one another. The main character sees that some have been under humans so long that they are helpless in the face of change, while others are still able to adapt and survive. Stewart shows that humans have routinely influenced the lives of almost every plant and animal around them.

Another theme of the book is what happens to human skills as the population decreases. Reviewer Lionel Shriver points out this theme in an article about literature which features human extinction:

But as Stewart tracks three post-plague generations, he vividly demonstrates that advanced civilisation depends on numbers. Reduce the race to the size of a small town and how many residents will remember how to make plastic? The last Americans plunder canned goods (with little respect for sell-by dates), and literacy atrophies; electrical and water systems break down. At length, the community reverts to its hunter-gatherer forebears.

Stewart uses the second half of his book to show that, if humans are reduced to low numbers, it will be difficult for them to continue civilization as we know it. Literacy becomes a casualty.

The society is so small that the death of one member—a little boy named Joey—seems likely to determine for many generations to come whether the emerging society will or won't be literate...As Ish thinks of it, each new baby is a candle lit against the dark.

If skills and customs don't work in the new situation, these die out, or those holding them do. Children adapt naturally to the new situation, and immediately useful customs and skills are more interesting to them than reading and writing. The information in libraries is useless within a generation.

One custom that Stewart predicts could die out is racism. When there are fewer partners to choose from, mankind will not be able to afford to be too choosy in picking one's partner.

Another issue he brings up is how law and order will function, when the lawmakers, courts and enforcers are all gone. Even laws would not be immune to the pressure to survive. One of the characters in the book points out, "What laws?" when they have to determine the fate of an outsider. Stewart shows how people may come to worry about potential harm rather than justice when dealing with outsiders.

=== Biblical theme: replenishing the Earth ===
A 1949 book review says that Earth Abides parallels two biblical stories that shows mankind spreading out and populating the world:

...the dual themes are as old as Genesis...Not a flood but a swift and deadly new disease wipes out all but a few of the human race. Ish (for "Isherwood") is the Noah of this "Great Disaster". As material civilization begins to crumble, Ish gradually devolves into a kind of Adam who, inevitably, finds his Eve, Em (for "Emma"), a level-headed lady with Negro blood, and nature takes its time-worn course. Em is hailed by Ish as "The Mother of Nations".

According to one reviewer, there is another tale of the fall of civilization of which George R. Stewart could have taken account—the story of Ishi, who at the time Stewart was writing was believed to be the last of his tribe, and who lived at Berkeley, where Stewart later taught. The name Ish is very similar to Ishi, and it also means "man", in the language of a man whose whole tribe was dead. Ishi's story parallels the Genesis and Earth Abides stories, telling of one who has to adapt to a changed world.

== Genre and style ==
The novel belongs to the subgenre of apocalyptic science fiction that features a universal plague that nearly wipes out humanity. Other examples include Mary Shelley's The Last Man (1826), Jack London's The Scarlet Plague (1912), Michael Crichton's The Andromeda Strain (1969), and Stephen King's The Stand (1978).

Earth Abides also fits into the "post-apocalyptic" subgenre. It was published in 1949, four years after the end of World War II and in the earliest stages of the Cold War. It predates many similar novels including Alas, Babylon (1959), A Canticle for Leibowitz (1960), and The Last Ship (1988). It is itself predated, however, by The Machine Stops (1909) and René Barjavel's Ashes, Ashes (Ravage, 1943), among others.

One reviewer notes that "there are no mutants, no warring tribes. I think the most refreshing aspect of this classic novel is just how human an approach Stewart applied to this story."

== Reception ==
According to WorldCat, there have been 28 editions of Earth Abides published in English. The book has been in print in every decade from 1949 to 2008.

James Sallis, writing in 2003 in the Boston Globe:

This is a book, mind you, that I'd place not only among the greatest science fiction but among our very best novels. Each time I read it, I'm profoundly affected, affected in a way only the greatest art — Ulysses, Matisse or Beethoven symphonies, say — affects me. Epic in sweep, centering on the person of Isherwood Williams, Earth Abides proves a kind of antihistory, relating the story of humankind backwards, from ever-more-abstract civilization to stone-age primitivism.

Astounding reviewer P. Schuyler Miller identified the novel as one of the first regarding "a young and little understood science, the science of ecology". Miller praised Stewart for "the intricacy of detail with which he has worked out his problem in ecology" and for writing "quietly, with very few peaks of melodrama as seem necessary in much popular fiction".

It was mentioned in a serious overview of modern science fiction, "Contemporary Science Fiction" by August Derleth, in the January 1952 edition of College English. Derleth called it an "excellent example" of the "utopian theme" of "rebuilding after a holocaust leaving but few survivors".

It was described as a persuasive answer to the question, "What is man," in the October 1973 edition of Current Anthropology. The article "Anthropology and Science Fiction" examines the nature of Science Fiction and its relationship to understanding people. The magazine concluded of Earth Abides that it shows ..."man is man, be he civilized or tribal. Stewart shows us that a tribal hunting culture is just as valid and real to its members as civilization is to us."

In the article "California's Literary Regionalism", published in the autumn 1955 issue of American Quarter, Stewart is seen as a "humanist in the old classical sense. His novels, Storm, Fire, East of the Giants, Earth Abides, demonstrate the complex interlocking of topography, climate, and human society; and their general tone is objective and optimistic."

== Adaptations ==
In November 1950, the book was adapted for the CBS radio program Escape as a two-part drama starring John Dehner. A television adaptation was released by Amazon MGM Studios in December 2024.

== References to other works ==
The book makes a reference to Robinson Crusoe and The Swiss Family Robinson. Ish compares the situations within these books to what he is going through. He finds Robinson Crusoe less appealing, because "his religious preoccupations seemed boring and rather silly". He looks at the ship in The Swiss Family Robinson as an "infinite grab-bag from which at any time they might take exactly what they wanted", which is similar to the situation of those living after the Great Disaster.

== Legacy and homages ==
- Earth Abides is one of a number of science fiction novels included in the series SF Masterworks.
- Stephen King has stated that Earth Abides was an inspiration for his post-apocalyptic novel The Stand.
- Composer Philip Aaberg wrote a piece of music, titled "Earth Abides", inspired by the novel. The piece was originally written as part of a soundtrack commissioned by the National Geographic Society for a documentary on the Earth. The track can be found on the Windham Hill CD "A Winter's Solstice III" (track 15).
- Jimi Hendrix claimed that Earth Abides was his favorite book and his song "Third Stone from the Sun" is inspired by the novel.
- Earth Abides was an influence on the 2013 post-apocalyptic video game The Last of Us, and a character is seen reading the novel in "The Price", a 2025 episode of the game's TV adaptation.
