= The Regime (miniseries) =

2024 British-American television miniseries

- Official poster
- Genre: Political satire
- Created by: Will Tracy
- Directed by: Stephen Frears; Jessica Hobbs
- Starring: Kate Winslet; Matthias Schoenaerts; Guillaume Gallienne; Andrea Riseborough; Martha Plimpton; Hugh Grant
- Music by: Alexandre Desplat (episodes 1–3); Alex Heffes (episodes 4–6)
- Countries of origin: United Kingdom; United States
- Original language: English
- No. of episodes: 6

Production
- Executive producers: Stephen Frears; Kate Winslet; Frank Rich; Tracey Seaward; Will Tracy
- Cinematography: Alwin H. Küchler
- Editors: Peter Lambert; Paulo Pandolpho
- Running time: 48–51 minutes
- Production companies: Juggle Productions; Hot Seat Productions; HBO Entertainment

Original release
- Network: HBO
- Release: March 3 – April 7, 2024

The Regime is a British-American political satire miniseries from HBO starring Kate Winslet, Matthias Schoenaerts, Guillaume Gallienne, Andrea Riseborough, Martha Plimpton, and Hugh Grant. Will Tracy is writer and executive producer on the series, with Stephen Frears and Jessica Hobbs directing episodes and executive-producing. Winslet, Frank Rich, and Tracey Seaward are also executive producers. Winslet plays Elena Vernham, a dictator ruling precariously over a fictional Central European country.

The Regime premiered on March 3, 2024, with all six episodes debuting in the US on HBO and Max, and in the UK exclusively on Sky Atlantic and Now from April 8, 2024.

Though the miniseries received mixed reviews, Kate Winslet's performance has been singled out for praise from critics.

== Synopsis ==
The series depicts a year within the palace of an unnamed fictional country somewhere in Europe with a vain and corrupt leader, Chancellor Elena Vernham. The authoritarian government is crumbling. After not leaving the palace for quite some time, Vernham becomes increasingly paranoid and unstable and turns to a volatile soldier, Herbert Zubak, as an unlikely confidant. As Zubak's influence over the chancellor grows, Elena's attempts to expand her power eventually result in the palace and the country fracturing around her.

== Cast ==
=== Main ===
- Kate Winslet as Elena Vernham, the chancellor of a Central European autocracy who gradually finds her position threatened by domestic turmoil.
- Matthias Schoenaerts as Herbert Zubak, a recently disgraced soldier appointed as Elena's personal "water diviner" who quickly becomes her most trusted advisor.
- Guillaume Gallienne as Nicholas Vernham, Elena's French, poetry-loving husband who becomes suspicious of her relationship with Zubak and his influence over her.
- Andrea Riseborough as Agnes, the Palace Manager and Elena's right-hand woman.
- Danny Webb as Mr. Laskin, the head of the country's security service.
- Henry Goodman as Mr. Singer, one of Elena's ministers.
- David Bamber as Victor Schiff, one of Elena's ministers.
- Michael Colgan as Huber, one of Elena's ministers.
- Rory Keenan as Peter, Agnes' husband
- Stanley Townsend as Emil Bartos, the country's leading businessman and director of its cobalt mines.

=== Guest ===
- Martha Plimpton as Judith Holt, a United States senator and the chair of the Senate Foreign Relations Committee who seeks to protect American interests in the country's cobalt resources.
- Hugh Grant as Edward Keplinger, the former chancellor who was ousted seven years earlier and has since been held prisoner in a cell located beneath the palace.
- Pippa Haywood as Susan Goin, the former Minister of Finance who is imprisoned after being falsely accused of conspiring to assassinate Elena.
- Jessica Frances Dukes as Deborah Kaiser, the wife of an American CEO seeking to access the country's cobalt resources.
- Karl Markovics as Tomas.
- Julia Davis as Marina, a dream interpreter.
- Kenneth Collard as Dr. Kershaw, Elena's former personal physician who is imprisoned after being falsely accused of conspiring to assassinate her.
- Louie Mynett as Oskar, Agnes' epileptic son whom Elena dotes upon.
- Kasia Madera as a state news anchor

== Episodes ==
No.	Title	Directed by	Written by	Original release date	U.S. viewers (millions)
1	"Victory Day"	Stephen Frears	Will Tracy	March 3, 2024	0.310
2	"The Foundling"	Stephen Frears	Will Tracy	March 10, 2024	0.155
3	"The Heroes' Banquet"	Jessica Hobbs	Sarah DeLappe and Juli Weiner	March 17, 2024	0.183
4	"Midnight Feast"	Stephen Frears	Seth Reiss	March 24, 2024	0.185
5	"All Ye Faithful"	Jessica Hobbs	Gary Shteyngart and Jen Spyra	March 31, 2024	0.130
6	"Don't Yet Rejoice"	Jessica Hobbs	Will Tracy	April 7, 2024	0.120

== Production ==
The project was announced by HBO in July 2022 with Will Tracy serving as showrunner, Stephen Frears directing, and Kate Winslet, Frank Rich, and Tracey Seaward acting as executive producers. The writing team included Seth Reiss, Juli Weiner, Jen Spyra, Gary Shteyngart, and Sarah DeLappe. The miniseries marked Winslet's third lead role in an HBO drama series after Mildred Pierce and Mare of Easttown. In April 2023, the title of the project was officially revealed to have changed from the working title The Palace to The Regime.

=== Casting ===
In October 2022, Matthias Schoenaerts was added to the cast. In December 2022, it was confirmed that Andrea Riseborough was joining the cast, and that Hugh Grant would appear in a guest role. In January 2023 the series added Martha Plimpton to the cast and Jessica Hobbs behind the camera as co-executive producer and director. That same month, Guillaume Gallienne was cast as Winslet's husband. In April 2023, it was announced Danny Webb, David Bamber, Henry Goodman, Stanley Townsend, Louie Mynett, Rory Keenan, Karl Markovics, and Pippa Haywood had joined the cast of the series.

=== Filming ===
Filming in Austria took place in January 2023 at the Schönbrunn Palace and at the Liechtenstein Garden Palace on Fürstengasse, in the 9th district of Vienna. A first look image released in February 2023 showed Winslet filming on set in Austria, with principal photography also taking place in the United Kingdom at Wentworth Woodhouse near Rotherham, South Yorkshire.

== Reception ==
=== Critical reception ===
On the review aggregator website Rotten Tomatoes, 51% of 80 critics' reviews are positive, with an average rating of 5.60/10. The website's consensus reads: "Kate Winslet reigns supreme with another commanding performance even as The Regime's hold over its scabrously satirical tone proves wobbly." On Metacritic, the series holds a weighted average score of 56 out of 100, based on 41 critics, indicating "mixed or average reviews".

=== Accolades ===
Award	Date of ceremony	Category	Nominee(s)	Result	Ref.
Gotham TV Awards	June 4, 2024	Outstanding Performance in a Limited Series	Andrea Riseborough	Nominated	
Primetime Creative Arts Emmy Awards	September 7–8, 2024	Outstanding Contemporary Costumes for a Limited or Anthology Series or Movie	Consolata Boyle, Marion Weise, Bobbie Edwards, Johanna Garrad, and Jane Law (for "The Heroes' Banquet")	Nominated	
Golden Globe Awards	January 5, 2025	Best Performance by a Female Actor in a Limited Series, Anthology Series, or a Motion Picture Made for Television	Kate Winslet	Nominated	
Critics' Choice Awards	February 7, 2025	Best Supporting Actor in a Limited Series or Movie Made for Television	Hugh Grant	Nominated	
