= Earth Abides (TV series) =

- Genre: Post-apocalyptic; Drama; Science fiction
- Created by: Todd Komarnicki
- Based on: Earth Abides by George R. Stewart
- Starring: Alexander Ludwig; Jessica Frances Dukes; Aaron Tveit; Rodrigo Fernandez-Stoll; Elyse Levesque; Luisa D'Oliveira; Kett Turton; Hilary McCormack; Jenna Berman
- Country of origin: United States
- Original language: English
- No. of episodes: 6

Production
- Executive producers: Juliana Maio; Kearie Peak; Michael Phillips; Todd Komarnicki
- Running time: 45–58 minutes
- Production companies: Brightlight Pictures; Lighthouse Productions; Peak TV; Guy Walks Into a Bar; MGM+ Studios

Original release
- Network: MGM+
- Release: December 1 – December 29, 2024

Earth Abides is an American post-apocalyptic science fiction drama television miniseries created by Todd Komarnicki, and starring Alexander Ludwig and Jessica Frances Dukes. It is based on George R. Stewart's novel of the same title. The series premiered on December 1, 2024, via MGM+ in the United States and Stan in Australia.

== Cast ==
- Alexander Ludwig as Isherwood (Ish)
- Jessica Frances Dukes as Emma
- Aaron Tveit as Charlie
- Rodrigo Fernandez-Stoll as Jorge
- Elyse Levesque as Maurine
- Luisa D'Oliveira as Molly
- Kett Turton as Ezra
- Leah Gibson as Ann
- Martin Donovan as Milton
- Hilary McCormack as Jean
- Jenna Berman as Evie

== Episodes ==
No.	Title	Directed by	Teleplay by	Original release date
1	"Alone"	Bronwen Hughes	Todd Komarnicki	December 1, 2024
Ish, short for Isherwood, Williams, a geology student, is working in a remote cabin somewhere in the Pacific Northwest for his graduate thesis. While out sampling one day, he is bitten by a rattlesnake on his hand. He quickly makes an incision to bleed out the poison and hurries back to his cabin. His condition quickly worsens and spends the next three weeks in and out of consciousness before ultimately recovering. Ish drives to the nearest supermarket and finds a corpse with signs of severe illness in the parking lot as well as a road sign saying the US government has been suspended due to a global pandemic. He heads to his childhood home in Berkeley, California, on San Lupo Drive, where he finds the corpses of his parents and signs of total societal collapse on the way. After burying his parents, he travels to Las Vegas in the hopes of finding survivors. He finds two, Ann and Milton, in a casino. They're imbibing a lot of alcohol and invite him to stay with them for a few weeks; having calculated that is how long the power, food and water will last, after which they plan to commit suicide. Ish refuses their invitation in the hopes of finding more survivors. After leaving Las Vegas, he drives dangerously fast back to Berkeley and narrowly avoids hitting a dog that's standing in the road. Seeing how friendly the dog is, Ish decides to keep it and names it Lucky. They head back to Berkeley and stock up on books about survival, fishing and relevant material from the Berkeley Public library. One year later, Ish is awoken by Lucky barking at the sign of smoke coming from a nearby chimney.
2	"The Space Between"	Bronwen Hughes	Karen Janszen	December 8, 2024
Ish rushes to the house with the smoking chimney with his geology hammer as his only weapon. He finds Emma on the rooftop of the house armed with a rifle. After a brief exchange outside, they warm up to each other, Emma revealing she only arrived recently in town. Ish spends the night inside the house with Emma, each sleeping on the floor in their own sleeping bag. The following day, Ish brings Emma back to his house and the two live together. After some time, they share a kiss and become romantically involved. Hoping to make a more permanent residence, they build a chicken coop, start planting vegetables and set up solar panels on the roof. Emma asks how many months will the solar panels take to be installed, Ish asks why she specified "months" and she reveals she is pregnant. Over the next months, Ish is forced to hunt for meat, an activity normally reserved to Emma, and the house gets power. Later, with the lack of human habitation, rats begin swarming the city, causing Ish and Emma to shelter in the house and block all entries. As the months progress, feral cats eventually take care of the rat infestation and Emma gives birth to Heather. Emma spray paints their address on a wall announcing there are survivors living at San Lupo Drive, the episode closes on a silhouette of someone seeing the graffiti.
3	"World Without End"	Rachel Leiterman	Tony Spiridakis	December 15, 2024
Four years later (six years into the outbreak), Ish finds a frightened girl (later named Evie) in the woods, who refuses to speak, but after Ish offers her an apple, she eventually climbs into the truck bed and Ish drives back to San Lupo. Jorge and Maurine - the silhouette from ep. 1 - have since joined them, moving into the house next-door, while Ish and Emma have had a 2nd child, a son, Alex. Evie is still refusing to talk or communicate properly, so the adults agree to go back to the area where she was found in order to find her "people." Going back the next day, Ish and Jorge find a cabin with signs of abuse while, back at San Lupo, Maurine finds a note in Evie's backpack from her mother. The note states that Evie was abused by her father following the outbreak and that the mother was unable to protect Evie, asking whoever finds her to protect Evie now. Jorge and Maurine take in Evie as their daughter. Emma eventually gives birth to her and Ish's third child, Joey. Some time later, the adults hear alarm bells triggered and rush the children to safety while they investigate. They find three adults, Ezra (a former club owner), his two wives, Jean (formerly a famous musician), Molly (a resident surgeon), and Raif, Molly's son. The new group is invited to San Lupo. Ish is initially cautious of them, but Emma convinces him to let them stay, saying that having a medical expert would be useful. While looking for supplies in town the next day, Ezra finds a guitar for Jean and Molly goes alone against Ish's instructions to raid for locked medical supplies at a local hospital, where she fends off a feral dog with a fire extinguisher. Initially upset at Molly for going off alone, the group rejoices at the supplies and share an evening with Jean's musical talents. Jean later reveals to Molly that she is pregnant, however she's not sure if she wants to continue the pregnancy, but Molly encourages her to keep the baby. Jorge gifts Ish a bigger hammer, saying he needs proper tools, and Ish appreciates the gesture. Later, Jean gives birth to her child. Some time after, a storm hits the town. The people are safe but Lucky is killed by a falling tree branch. While repairing the damages from the storm, Ish tells Jorge he is his best friend, preferring him over Ezra. Later, while walking the grounds, Ish spots a mountain lion stalking menacingly towards Evie and Joey. He quickly runs in its path, attacking it and getting mauled while Evie yells for help.
4	"Predators"	Rachel Leiterman	Evan Hart & Kyle Stephen	December 22, 2024
The group is huddled over the badly injured Ish as Molly tends to his wounds. Angered at the events, Emma goes out to hunt the mountain lion, shooting it repeatedly when she finds it. While Ish and Molly are alone, Ish commends her on saving him. She reveals that she lied about her career and actually flunked her first year of medical school, expressing regret over the lie. Ish still commends her telling her that she didn't fail him, rather, she caught back up to her lie. After many weeks, Ish is back on his feet but still bearing scars from the attack. Heather and Raif have started a romantic relationship and ask to set out with supplies to explore the world, saying they will be back before winter. Ish reluctantly allows them after Emma convinces him. Heather and Raif then leave with supplies, a map and compass and a weapon. During a drought, Ish, Ezra and Joey go out to see the local reservoir and notice it is empty and the piping is broken, estimating they only have a week's worth of water unless it rains. Joey notices a large caravan driving on the dam's road. Ish is wary of their numbers and quickly drives back to San Lupo as the members of the caravan attempt to follow them. The caravan, having found Emma's graffiti, go to San Lupo, now with a high fence surrounding it after the mountain lion attack. The leader of the caravan, Charlie, offers them a drink from his canteen as a peace offering and quotes a line from Emerson, which Ish recognizes. Having the equipment to dig a well, Charlie offers the caravan's services in exchange for food and fuel for their later departure, estimating the well could be dug within 72 hours. Ish agrees but remains cautious due to Charlie's suspicious behavior especially after Charlie and another caravan member, Silas, exchange suspicious glances while relaxing around a campfire. Ish shares his concerns with Emma and she reminds him how he was also cautious of the others before they joined, but they have become great additions to San Lupo. Ish still doesn't like how comfortable the caravan members are, being in their settlement. The next day, the well is broken through and water sprays all over the yard.
5	"The Return"	Stephen Campanelli	Karen Janszen	December 22, 2024
After the installation of a water pump and the ensuing celebration, Ish hears strange noises coming from Evie's cabin and finds Silas guarding Evie's door. Charlie emerges from the cabin with his pants undone and Ish watches him leave with Silas. Perry, Charlie's partner, recognizes what happened and is upset. She leaves to sleep in one of the San Lupo houses. Molly later confirms Evie was raped by Charlie and has gone mute again. The San Lupo adults gather and reluctantly, but unanimously, vote to kill Charlie, as he would be a permanent threat to their group. Ish kills Charlie with his hammer while the others stand by with guns. The next morning, they explain what happened to Perry and offer her a place in San Lupo. Later, they extend the offer to the rest of the caravan except for Silas. The caravan members rebel against Silas and Charlie's leadership, choosing to stay at San Lupo. Silas initially leaves only to drive back within minutes, saying he doesn't have anything or anyone and asking for clemency. Ish retorts by saying Silas ignored Evie's request for help while she was being raped. Silas relents and leaves. The community thrives and Joey eventually reveals a prototype for a solar powered glider to help explore the area. The virus eventually returns, initially infecting Joey, then other members of San Lupo. Alex remains unaffected by the return of the virus and, having observed Ish's preference for Joey over the years, asks Ish if he would be as sad if he were the one to be infected. Heather returns to San Lupo, saying that she and Raif were attacked by a lone raider, only she survived and had to eventually walk for weeks to get back to San Lupo. In a frenzy, Ish heads over to a hospital in San Francisco to get more medical supplies, while having sporadic hallucinations of Charlie. Before Ish leaves, he enters the hospital's church - despite his disbelief - and asks God not to take Joey.
6	"Forever is Tomorrow is Today"	Stephen Campanelli	Todd Komarnicki	December 29, 2024
Heather is recounting her and Raif's journey, exploring various cities, being happy and romantic together, and mentions some spray painted graffiti with numbers they kept seeing. She eventually retells the attack by a lone raider (Silas) resulting in Raif's death. Joey's conditioning is worsening while others are starting to recover, Heather offers to help on the medical check-ups. While Heather checks on the caravan members, one of them (Kori) asks what the lone raider looked like, she says there was not much human left but she remembers golden tattoos. He remembers Silas' tattoos but doesn't say anything. Later when Molly checks up on him, he asks for advice regarding a secret he can never tell anybody. Molly replies that if the secret makes the world better, keep it secret, otherwise share it. He chooses not to tell anyone. Joey eventually succumbs to the virus. In anger, Ish rushes to cover the graffiti inviting survivors to San Lupo and then intends to burn the library where he got all the books, which was Joey's favorite place. Emma dissuades him from burning down the library. Ish eventually recovers from his grief and cleans up Joey's room. He finds a journal where Joey talks about wanting to find others by building a radio transceiver. After sharing the project with other members, the receiver is eventually assembled and Ish and Ezra set up the antenna on a watch tower. Ish tells Ezra how much he has come to appreciate him and the two share a handshake before Ish says "fuck it" and they hug. Ish later begins to check all possible frequencies. During a baseball game (played with lemons), Heather tells Ish of the numbers she kept finding: 147 225, along with arrows but the arrows never led anywhere. Realizing it could be a radio frequency, Ish interrupts the game and rushes to send a message to that frequency. After two unanswered calls, another voice finally responds saying they settled by the ocean in Point Lobo in order to be able to fish. Ish realizes it's relatively close and that San Lupo and Point Lobo both share a wolf toponym (wolf translating to lupo in Latin and lobo in Spanish), hearkening back to discussions regarding fate he had with Emma. They agree to visit Point Lobo and meet the community of 77 souls. The episode ends, year 50 into the outbreak, with Ish gifting his hammer to Jack, Heather's firstborn and quoting to him a biblical passage; "Men go and come, but Earth abides."

== Production ==
In March 2024, it was announced that MGM+ had greenlit an adaptation of Stewart's novel, production to begin in Vancouver, on April 8 (to June 21), as a six-episode limited series, with Ludwig cast as Ish. In April that same year, it was announced that Dukes had been cast as the female lead. In June that same year, it was announced that several other actors, including Aaron Tveit, had been cast in the series. The main street in Cloverdale, Surrey, British Columbia was transformed for the TV series.

== Reception ==
Alex Maidy of JoBlo.com gave the series a mixed review and wrote that it “has an important message that is worth hearing, but this series squanders its potential.”
