= Todd Komarnicki =

American director and producer

- Born: October 19, 1965 (age 60); Philadelphia, Pennsylvania, U.S.
- Occupations: Director, producer, writer
- Years active: 2003–present

Todd Komarnicki (born 19 October 1965) is an American playwright, novelist, screenwriter, director, and producer.

== Career ==
In the literary world, his first novel, Free, was published by Doubleday in 1993 and his second novel, Famine (Arcade 1997), received tremendous reviews and was subsequently translated into French, Italian, and German. His third novel, war, was published to exceptional reviews in July of 2008 by Arcade.

His career breakthrough was producing Elf (with Jon Berg), the 2003 Christmas movie starring Will Ferrell and directed by Jon Favreau. In the same year, Komarnicki wrote and directed Resistance, a Dutch/American World War II film starring Bill Paxton and Julia Ormond, based on Anita Shreeve's novel of the same name. In 2007, he wrote the neo-noir psychological thriller film Perfect Stranger, directed by James Foley, and starring Halle Berry and Bruce Willis. Komarnicki also co-wrote The Professor and the Madman (2019) with Farhad Safinia, starring Mel Gibson and Sean Penn.

Komarnicki has written EARTH ABIDES, for MGM+, an adaptation of the international sci-fi favorite, by George Stewart, the series premiered December 1st, 2024.

Komarnicki is the president & founder of the production/management company Guy Walks Into A Bar. Komarnicki's films have accounted for well over half a billion dollars at the box office.

=== Elf ===
Komarnicki produced the Christmas blockbuster Elf starring Will Ferrell and directed by Jon Favreau. The film amassed over $220 million worldwide, and has become a perennial favorite every Christmas season.

=== Meet Dave ===
Produced by Guy Walks Into a Bar, Meet Dave (2008) is a bawdy space comedy starring Eddie Murphy and Elizabeth Banks, directed by Brian Robbins and written by Rob Greenberg and Bill Corbett.

=== Sully ===
Komarnicki received critical acclaim for writing Sully (2015), starring Tom Hanks and directed by Clint Eastwood. Sully is about Captain Chesley "Sully" Sullenberger's emergency landing of US Airways Flight 1549 in the Hudson River, based on Sullenberger's 2009 autobiography Highest Duty. The film debuted at $35.5 million in the U.S. its opening weekend, and went on to gross a total of $238 million worldwide, outperforming initial expectations. Sully was selected as an AFI Top Ten film for 2016, and won Best Foreign Film at the 40th Japanese Academy Prize Awards 2017.

=== Bonhoeffer ===
Written, produced and directed by Komarnicki, Bonhoeffer, formerly known as God's Spy is the true story of pastor-turned-spy Dietrich Bonhoeffer. The film stars Jonas Dassler, Moritz Bleibtreu, August Diehl, David Jonsson, and Flula Borg. It released November 22, 2024.

== Filmography ==
Film

Year	Title	Director	Writer	Producer
2003	Resistance	Yes	Yes	
2003	Elf			Yes
2007	Perfect Stranger		Yes	
2008	Meet Dave			Yes
2016	Sully		Yes	
2019	The Professor and the Madman		Yes	
2024	Bonhoeffer	Yes	Yes	Yes

Television

Year	Title	Writer	Executive Producer	Notes
2008	Giants of Radio		Yes	TV movie
2009	This Might Hurt		Yes	TV movie
2024	Earth Abides	Yes	Yes	Also creator
