= Perfect Stranger (film) =

2007 film by James Foley

- Theatrical release poster
- Directed by: James Foley
- Screenplay by: Todd Komarnicki
- Story by: Jon Bokenkamp
- Produced by: Elaine Goldsmith-Thomas; Stephanie Langhoff; Daniel A. Thomas
- Starring: Halle Berry; Bruce Willis; Giovanni Ribisi; Gary Dourdan
- Cinematography: Anastas N. Michos
- Edited by: Christopher Tellefsen
- Music by: Antonio Pinto
- Production companies: Columbia Pictures; Revolution Studios
- Distributed by: Sony Pictures Releasing
- Release date: April 13, 2007
- Running time: 109 minutes
- Country: United States
- Language: English
- Budget: $60 million
- Box office: $73.5 million

Perfect Stranger is a 2007 American psychological thriller film, directed by James Foley, and starring Halle Berry and Bruce Willis. It was produced by Revolution Studios for Columbia Pictures, who released the film on April 13, 2007. The film was panned by critics, with its twist ending being the most criticized, and underperformed at the box office, grossing $73.5 million on a $60 million budget.

== Plot ==
Under the pen name David Shane, reporter Rowena Price investigates a sex scandal involving Senator Sachs alongside her researcher Miles Haley. However, the story is shut down when their source becomes silent and her editor Arvis Narron, a supporter of Sachs, puts a stop to the story.

While walking home, Rowena meets her childhood friend Grace Clayton, who seeks her help in taking down wealthy advertising executive Harrison Hill. Grace gives Rowena her e-mails as proof of their extramarital affair, which Harrison recently ended.

A few days later, Grace is found dead, drowned and poisoned with belladonna, leading Rowena to suspect Harrison. With Miles' help, she goes undercover as a temporary worker at Harrison's advertising company, H2A. While setting up gift bags for a Victoria's Secret collection launch, she meets fellow advertiser Gina, who reveals that Harrison is rich because of his wife, Mia, and if she left him, he would be penniless, causing him to be more secretive with his affairs.

Rowena flirts with Harrison both online and in real life, but she does not realize that the online Harrison is actually Miles, who is secretly obsessed with her. One evening, Harrison catches Rowena snooping, thinks she is a corporate spy, but believes her story of wanting to leave him a note without others finding out she likes him. He pretends to fires her, but only to take her to dinner where they make out. When she goes to the bathroom, he finds a text from Miles on her phone and discovers she has been lying. He finally accuses her of spying for his boss Jon Kirschenbaum and fires her.

At Miles's apartment, Rowena discovers a shrine to her and explicit pictures of Miles and Grace, before she confronts him. He defends himself by providing evidence that Harrison had access to belladonna for poisoning. Rowena goes to the police, and Harrison is arrested for the murder of Grace.

After Harrison's conviction, Miles visits Rowena and reveals that he knows she is the real killer and used the investigation to frame Harrison. Rowena then flashes back to a memory of her father attempting to molest her, and her mother subsequently bludgeoning him to death with a fireplace poker. A younger Grace watches from her window as they bury the body; Grace has been blackmailing Rowena with this information ever since.

Miles goes on to describe how Rowena had plotted the murder to end Grace's blackmail and pinned the crime on Harrison. When he asks how she intends to keep him quiet, she stabs him to death and ransacks the kitchen. Rowena then calls the police, claiming to have been attacked by Miles and that he might have been the real murderer. As she waits for the police, a man looks out of a neighboring window, having witnessed the events.

== Cast ==
- Halle Berry as Rowena Price
  - Maya N. Blake as Young Rowena Price
- Bruce Willis as Harrison Hill
- Giovanni Ribisi as Miles Haley
- Richard Portnow as Arvis Narron
- Gary Dourdan as Cameron
- Florencia Lozano as Lieutenant Karen Tejada
- Nicki Aycox as Grace Clayton
  - Nadine Jacobson as Young Grace Clayton
- Kathleen Chalfant as Elizabeth Clayton
- Gordon MacDonald as Senator Sachs
- Daniella van Graas as Josie
- Paula Miranda as Mia Hill
- Patti D'Arbanville as Esmeralda
- Clea Lewis as Gina
- Tamara Feldman as Bethany
- Gerry Becker as Jon Kirshenbaum
- Jared Burke as Kenneth Phelps
- Jason Antoon as Bill Patel
- Heidi Klum as Herself
- Todd Komarnicki as CSI Witness
- Emma Heming as Donna
- Michael Tolan as Judge
- Jacqueline Cannon as Mrs. Price
  - Yvonna Kopacz as Young Mrs. Price
- Vincent Lamberti as Mr. Price
- Thomas Michael Sullivan as Executive
- Lauren Potter as Client
- James D-Train Williams as Singer

== Production ==
In September 2000, it was reported that Revolution Studios had signed a deal with Jon Bokenkamp to write the script Perfect Strangers with Julia Roberts attached to star. In November 2001, Philip Kaufman became attached to direct and develop the film with Frank Renzulli slated to do a rewrite. Kaufman was intrigued by the script, which followed female investigative journalist Rowena Price going undercover on the Internet to solve the mystery of her friend Grace Clayton's murder, and relished the opportunity to work with Roberts. In December 2002, Revolution hired Bob Edwards to conduct further rewrites to the film. In November 2004, Halle Berry had been set as the lead as Roberts had dropped out due to scheduling conflicts with another Revolution production Mona Lisa Smile, with Todd Komarnicki hired to perform another rewrite on the film. In August 2005, Bruce Willis was announced to have joined the cast with James Foley directing.

=== Filming ===
Some of the scenes were filmed in the lobby of the new 7 World Trade Center, before its opening on May 23, 2006.

== Release ==
=== Home media ===
Perfect Stranger was released on August 21, 2007, on DVD and Blu-ray.

The film was reissued on Blu-ray on April 4, 2017, by Mill Creek Entertainment. It is included as a 3-pack with Straightheads (2007) and Wind Chill (2007), the latter two making their US Blu-ray debut.

== Reception ==
=== Critical response ===
On review aggregator Rotten Tomatoes, Perfect Stranger holds an approval rating of 9% based on 141 reviews, with an average rating of 3.6/10. The site's critics' consensus reads: "Despite the presence of Halle Berry and Bruce Willis, Perfect Stranger is too convoluted to work, and features a twist ending that's irritating and superfluous. It's a techno-thriller without thrills." On Metacritic, the film holds a weighted average score of 31 out of 100 based on 31 critics, indicating "generally unfavorable reviews". Audiences polled by CinemaScore gave the film an average grade of "C+" on an A+ to F scale.

Peter Travers of Rolling Stone said, "Foley fights a losing battle with Perfect Stranger, a dull, dumb and unforgivably dated thriller, free of thrills and any kind of perfection, save a genius for product placement" ... "it's a techno thriller that treats the already cliché topic of Web abuse with an idiotic sense of discovery."

Brendan Willis of Exclaim! was critical of the twist ending, writing, "In the last five minutes the truth behind the entire story is revealed and there is no logical build-up to the conclusion. There is no Agatha Christie/Sherlock Holmes "did you notice the clues to the killer’s true identity?" moment, this ending just comes right out of left field and hits you over the head with the stupid stick." W. Andrew Powell of TheGATE.ca wrote, "Legendary movies are made by their endings. Even the stalest film on the planet can turn itself around, at least to some extent, with a snappy ending that either flips you on your ass, or explains the films events in a way that makes perfect, startling sense. Perfect Stranger certainly has a snappy ending, but only after plodding along for almost an hour and a half before turning the audience on its ass with a surprise ending that feels like we’ve somehow been cheated out of a fulfilling resolution. Give me a surprise ending any day, but don’t cheat me with an ending that doesn’t make any sense."
