= Not Okay =

2022 film by Quinn Shephard

- Release poster
- Directed by: Quinn Shephard
- Written by: Quinn Shephard
- Produced by: Brad Weston; Caroline Jaczko
- Starring: Zoey Deutch; Mia Isaac; Nadia Alexander; Embeth Davidtz; Karan Soni; Dylan O'Brien
- Cinematography: Robby Baumgartner
- Edited by: Mollie Goldstein
- Music by: Pierre-Philippe Côté
- Production company: Makeready
- Distributed by: Searchlight Pictures
- Release date: July 29, 2022
- Running time: 103 minutes
- Country: United States
- Language: English

Not Okay is a 2022 American satirical black comedy-drama film written and directed by Quinn Shephard. It stars Zoey Deutch as a young woman who desperately wants to be famous and beloved on the Internet, succeeding when she pretends to be a survivor of a bombing. It also stars Mia Isaac, Nadia Alexander, Embeth Davidtz, Karan Soni, and Dylan O'Brien.

Not Okay was released on July 29, 2022, by Searchlight Pictures on Hulu. It received generally positive reviews from critics, with the performances of Deutch and O'Brien being widely praised. A trigger warning at the beginning that mentioned an "unlikable female protagonist" as a possible issue for viewers, intended as a commentary on some viewers at test screenings questioning why a film with such a character had even been made, generated some controversy when viewers took it as seriously intended.

== Plot ==
Danni Sanders is an aspiring writer who works as a photo editor for Depravity, an online magazine in New York City. Struggling with both her job and making friends, Danni, after getting high off a hit from her co-worker and social media influencer Colin, whom she has a crush on, lies about attending an upcoming writers' retreat in Paris to impress him. Danni spends the next week posting edited pictures of herself in Paris from her Brooklyn apartment and creates a website for the fake retreat. She gains a modest following on Instagram as a result, which includes Colin. A few days later, Danni posts an edited photo of herself by the Arc de Triomphe, but a few minutes later, several major Parisian landmarks, including the Arc, are bombed by terrorists. To uphold her lie, Danni claims she witnessed the bombing and fakes returning from Paris, joining up with her parents at the airport.

With her parents, co-workers, and online following believing she is a survivor of the terrorist attacks, Danni immediately garners widespread attention and sympathy, leading Danni to lean into the lie. At a trauma support group, she meets and befriends teenage anti-gun activist Rowan Aldren, a school shooting survivor who has a large social media following. Inspired by Rowan, Danni writes an article about her "experience" of being in a terrorist attack. This article, which includes the hashtag #IAmNotOkay, goes viral with Rowan's help and propels Danni to fame. Danni grows closer to Rowan, becoming a confidant and sisterly figure to her. Danni is invited to an influencer party with Colin, where they have a brief sexual encounter, which is unpleasant for Danni and requires her to take Plan B. She realizes the life of fame she wanted is not as desirable as simply being a good person.

Danni is invited to speak at a rally with Rowan. When counter-protestors set off fireworks, Rowan suffers a PTSD attack and is hospitalized. Danni, who has been having recurring hallucinations of the Paris bomber, feels increasingly guilty about deceiving Rowan. Meanwhile, Harper, a skeptical co-worker of Danni's, uncovers her deception and gives Danni an ultimatum: either Harper will expose Danni's fraud to the world, or she can come clean on her own terms. Danni reluctantly publishes a short apology detailing the truth and promising to change. This derails her life quickly; she becomes an online pariah, is fired from her job, has her friendship with Rowan tarnished, is forced to move in with her parents after her address gets leaked online by harassers, and she and her parents receive death threats and harassment in real life. Danni soon deactivates all of her social media accounts.

A month later, Danni is attending a support group for individuals who are victims of online shaming, where she is encouraged to make amends with those she hurt. Danni attends a spoken word event where Rowan speaks about how Danni exploited her, and that she will never be okay with what Danni did, cementing their destroyed friendship, which impresses Danni and earns cheers from the crowd. Upon realizing that amends would be for her own benefit rather than for Rowan's, Danni quietly exits the theater.

== Cast ==
- Zoey Deutch as Danni Sanders
- Mia Isaac as Rowan Aldren
- Dylan O'Brien as Colin
- Nadia Alexander as Harper
- Tia Dionne Hodge as Linda Aldren
- Negin Farsad as Susan
- Embeth Davidtz as Judith Sanders
- Brennan Brown as Harold Sanders
- Karan Soni as Kelvin
- Dash Perry as Larson
- Kirk White as Charles
- Sarah Yarkin as Julie
- Julia Murney as Alice – support group woman
- Caroline Calloway as herself
- Quinn Shephard as herself
- Rocco Botte as Todd/Aaron
- Shawn Chatfield as Todd/Aaron

== Production ==
In June 2021, Zoey Deutch was announced to star in the film, with Quinn Shephard directing from a screenplay she wrote, with Searchlight Pictures set to produce, and Hulu distributing. In August 2021, Dylan O'Brien, Mia Isaac, Embeth Davidtz, Nadia Alexander, Tia Dionne Hodge, Negin Farsad, Karan Soni and Dash Perry were announced to star in the film.

Principal photography began in July 2021 in New York City. Filming wrapped on September 12, 2021.

== Trigger warning ==
At the beginning of the film, Shepard added a warning to viewers about things in the film that might make them physically or psychologically uncomfortable, including "flashing lights, themes of trauma, and an unlikable female protagonist." The latter item was the result of test screenings where viewers had indicated to her their bewilderment that someone would make a film with such a main character. "It was interesting to me that a large chunk of the audience seemed genuinely upset by the fact that the film was about Danni, and so I just wanted to kind of poke at it a little".

Many viewers, however, took the notice as completely seriously intended. Women who watched the film complained about the warning on Twitter, noting that films centered around unlikable men never seemed to need such warnings. Shuja Haider, a senior editor at The Nation, said she watched the film determined to like Danni as a result of the warning, and did. Gawker agreed that Danni was "despite her actions, a relatively likable female protagonist, all things considered"; it was the film itself that was unlikeable. "That its warning went the wrong type of viral this weekend only goes to show that films about the ills of social media will always be two steps behind the real thing."

== Release ==
The film was released on July 29, 2022, on Hulu in the United States, on Disney+ internationally and on Star+ in Latin America. It was originally scheduled to be released on August 5, 2022, before it was moved up a week.

== Reception ==
=== Viewership ===
Whip Media, which tracks viewership data for the more than 21 million worldwide users of its TV Time app, reported that Not Okay was the ninth most anticipated film of July 2022. The streaming aggregator Reelgood, which monitors real-time data from 5 million users in the U.S. for original and acquired streaming programs and movies across subscription video-on-demand (SVOD) and ad-supported video-on-demand (AVOD) services, calculated that Not Okay was the tenth most-streamed film in the U.S. during the week of August 5 to August 7, 2022. Whip Media announced that it was the third most.streamed film in the U.S. for the week ended July 31, 2022. It was later the tenth most-streamed film in the U.S. from August 5-7, 2022.

=== Critical response ===
On the review aggregator website Rotten Tomatoes, 71% of 113 critics' reviews are positive, with an average rating of 6.5/10. The website's consensus reads: "Even if it may not add much to the discourse, Not Okay makes some salient points about online life, with extra sparkle added by an effervescent Zoey Deutch." On Metacritic, the film has a weighted average score of 62 out of 100 based on 24 critics, indicating "generally favorable" reviews.

Lena Wilson of The New York Times found that the film succeeds to highlight some of the negative aspects of social media on people's mental health, and stated it manages to develop Zoey Deutch's character, notably across her mental health struggles, but said the movie lacks narrative finesse. Adrian Horton of The Guardian rated the film 3 out of 5 stars and found it to be a solid social media film, praising Deutch's performance for depicting anxiety and vanity across her character, and found the ending to be sharp, while saying the film's weaknesses reside in its looseness of tone and time.

Jennifer Green of Common Sense Media rated the film three out of five stars, complimented the depiction of positive messages, citing honesty and the film's take on the negative aspects of fame, while noting the diverse representations across the characters. Brian Tallerico of RogerEbert.com rated the film two and a half out of four stars and found it to be an entertaining comedy drama, complimenting Deutch and Mia Isaac for their performances, but found that the script restrains itself from depicting a truly dark satire.

=== Accolades ===
Dylan O'Brien was nominated for Best Comedic Performance at the 2023 MTV Movie + TV Awards.
