= Outbreak (2024 film) =

2024 horror film directed by Jeff Wolfe

- Official release poster
- Directed by: Jeff Wolfe
- Screenplay by: Lance Ochsner; Jeff Wolfe
- Story by: Erik Aude'
- Produced by: Kevin Matossian; Jeff Wolfe; Jennifer Wolfe
- Starring: Billy Burke; Alyshia Ochse; Taylor Handley; Jessica Frances Dukes
- Cinematography: Cary Lalonde
- Edited by: Arman Tahmizyan
- Music by: Michael A. Levine
- Production companies: Silvercrest Entertainment; WolfePride Production
- Release date: June 21, 2024 (DWF)
- Running time: 88 minutes
- Country: United States
- Language: English
- Budget: $1 million

Outbreak is a 2024 zombie mystery thriller film by the screenplay of Lance Ochsner and Jeff Wolfe and directed by Jeff Wolfe in his directorial debut. It stars Billy Burke, Alyshia Ochse, Taylor Handley and Jessica Frances Dukes. The films is about a park ranger searching for his son during a viral outbreak.

== Plot ==
A state park ranger Neil Morris and his wife, Abby, are grappling with the disappearance of their teenage son, Ben. Two months have passed since Ben vanished, leaving the couple in a state of despair and emotional turmoil.

A 911 call reports a rabid dog attack at a construction site. Neil, along with fellow rangers John Gibson and Chief Mike Cortez, respond to the incident. Neil's inability to shoot an aggressive dog eh at his deteriorating mental state.

As strange occurrences escalate, Neil notices unsettling behavior among the townspeople. Reports of violent attacks and erratic behavior suggest the spread of an unknown virus. The infected exhibit grotesque symptoms, including distorted features and aggressive tendencies.

Neil goes outside to commit suicide by shooting himself, when he sees a woman drowning in the lake. In a harrowing scene, Neil rescues the drowning woman, only to realize she is infected and attempts to attack him. He is forced to kill her in self-defense. More of the infected hear the commotion and go after him.

He goes back to his house to arm himself but quickly discovers that all the ammo for his gun in his home is gone. Abby threw it out, in an attempt to prevent him from killing himself. Neil then results to fighting hand to hand with the infected, stabbing one in the neck and strangling the other with an electrical cord. He soon recoups with Abby, and they head out to see chaos erupted in town. He tries and unsuccessfully gets to his friend Gibson on the radio. They come across a gas station where they take supplies and gas, and encounter one of the infected, which Neil promptly burns to death by after dousing them with gasoline and using a lighter to set them aflame.

He and Abby venture to his friend Mike’s house, hoping that Mike and his family aren’t infected. Neil finds Mike’s wife, Camila, infected. She then proceeds to attack him with a meat cleaver. Neil, taking ammo from the nearby gun display and loading it into his gun, kills Camila. Mike, who has also been infected, goes to choke him with Abby seeing this. Neil yells at Abby to shoot Mike, which she hesitates to do before she is then snatched up by Olivia, Mike’s daughter. Neil is able to overpower the infected Mike and kills him. Neil rushes out of the house to find Olivia chasing Abby. As Neil attempts to follow, he trips, hitting his head on a rock and falling unconscious.

He wakes up and heads back to his truck to discover Abby, now infected. He restrains her in the truck and goes to find help. Finally getting ahold of Gibson, Gibson tells Neil to meet him back at Neil’s home. Neil drives back to his house only to find Gibson and the rest of the rangers infected. Neil attempts to shoot them when Gibson surprisingly shoots back.

The truth is then revealed through flashbacks. Ben was running away with Neil, who was following after him. The two get into a fight near a cliff and Neil yanks on Ben’s bag, causing Ben to fall to his death. The outbreak was all a vivid manifestation of Neil’s guilt over Ben’s death and in reality he was killing innocent people as Abby was helpless to do anything. Neil then tries to shoot Abby, believing she is still infected, but is stopped by Gibson who shoots and kills him, ending the rampage.

== Cast ==
- Billy Burke as Neil Morris
- Alyshia Ochse as Abby Morris
- Taylor Handley as John Gibson
- Jessica Frances Dukes as Helen
- Raoul Max Trujillo as Chief Mike Cortez
- Dani Oliveros as Olivia Cortez
- Kylr Coffman as Ben Morris

== Production ==
Jeff Wolfe financed about half of the project together with his wife Jennifer Wolfe and raised the rest from his friends. Wolfe says that the film cost under $1 million. Wolfe also serves as president of the Stuntmen’s Association of Motion Pictures. The film shot under a SAG-AFTRA interim agreement for 19 days around Los Angeles during 2023 labor strikes.

Outbreak was released in theaters and VOD under Vertical.

== Release ==
The film was premiered at Dances With Films on June 21, 2024, and has a limited release on December 13, 2024.
