= They Call the Wind Maria =

Song from the musical Paint Your Wagon

"They Call the Wind Marīa" (/məˈraɪ.ə/ mə-RY-ə) is an American popular song with lyrics written by Alan J. Lerner and music by Frederick Loewe for their 1951 Broadway musical Paint Your Wagon, which is set in the California Gold Rush. Rufus Smith originally sang the song on Broadway, and Joseph Leader was the original singer in London's West End. It quickly became a runaway hit, and during the Korean War, the song was among the "popular music listened to by the troops". Vaughn Monroe and his Orchestra recorded the song in 1951, and it was among the "popular hit singles at the record stores" that year. It has since become a standard, performed by many notable singers across several genres of popular music. A striking feature of the song in the original orchestration (also used in many cover versions), is a driving, staccato rhythm, played on the string instruments, that evokes a sense of restless motion.

== Background and pronunciation of "Maria" ==
In the 1941 novel Storm, George Rippey Stewart gave the name "Maria" to the storm that is the antagonist of his novel. In 1947, Stewart wrote a new introduction for a reprint of the book and discussed the pronunciation of "Maria": "The soft Spanish pronunciation is fine for some heroines, but our Maria here is too big for any man to embrace and much too boisterous." He went on to say, "So put the accent on the second syllable, and pronounce it 'rye'".

The success of Stewart's novel was one factor that motivated U.S. military meteorologists to start the informal practice of giving women's names to storms in the Pacific during World War II. The practice became official in 1945. In 1953, a similar system of using women's names was adopted for North Atlantic storms. This continued until 1979, when men's names were incorporated into the system. Although Stewart's story is set in 1935, the novel and its effect on meteorology later inspired Lerner and Loewe to write a song for their play about the California gold rush, and like Stewart, they too gave a wind storm the name Maria, which is pronounced /məˈraɪ.ə/ mə-RY-ə. The lines throughout the song end in feminine rhymes mostly using the long 'i' sound /aɪ/, echoing the stress pattern and vowel sound of the name Maria.

== Critical reception ==
It has been called Paint Your Wagon's "best known song" and "rousing but plaintive." Musicologist Stephen Citron wrote, "Perhaps the most unusual song in the score is a beautiful ballad of lonely prospectors hungering for their women, 'They Call the Wind Maria' – not chauvinistic in this case, for each man is yearning for his own girl." Composer and conductor Lehman Engel wrote that the song "has a cowboy flavor", and commented that "In the lyric, its folk quality is accentuated." Engel concluded that "Lerner has invented an interesting kind of narration". Princeton University historian Robert V. Wells wrote that it is "a sad and wistful song about being far from home". Theater historian Don B. Wilmeth called the song "haunting", and said that it evokes "emptiness".

Members of the Western Writers of America chose it as one of the Top 100 Western songs of all time.

== Folk music revival ==
The song gained renewed popularity during the American folk music revival. In 1959, it was included on the Kingston Trio's first live album, ...from the Hungry i, which reached #2 on the Billboard Pop chart and won a RIAA gold record in 1960. It was also included on the Smothers Brothers first album, The Songs and Comedy of the Smothers Brothers! Recorded at the Purple Onion, San Francisco, released in 1961. Other folk singers who performed the song include Josh White and Burl Ives. Musical historian John Bush Jones wrote that the song "so evokes the American West that during the folksinging craze of the later 1950s countless Americans thought 'They Call the Wind Maria' was a folksong, not a show tune!"

== 1969 film version ==
The song was featured in the 1969 Hollywood film Paint Your Wagon, starring Lee Marvin, Clint Eastwood and Jean Seberg. In the film, the song was performed by Harve Presnell. The New York Times said that Presnell's role in the film "delivered the golden opportunity to sing the unforgettable ballad." Theater writer Thomas Hischak said that "in one of the film's few pleasing moments, Harve Presnell gave full voice to 'They Call the Wind Maria' and it was lovely to hear". Referring to Eastwood and Marvin, film reviewer Brian W. Fairbanks wrote that "Harve Presnell steals both stars' thunder with a knockout version of the best song."

In a promotional tie-in with release of the film, recorded versions of the song were issued by seven singers and groups, including Presnell, Ed Ames, Burl Ives, Jim Nabors and the Baja Marimba Band. Several record labels participated.

== Cultural influence ==
American singer Mariah Carey was named after this song.

Maria Creek, a glacial meltwater stream in Antarctica, was given its name on account of the strong winds in the area.

An episode of the TV series M*A*S*H is called “They Call the Wind Korea” (S7, E8 - originally aired 10/30/78).

Robin the Frog twice breaks into the song on The Muppet Show (S2, E12 - originally aired 11/4/77)

Two-time Tony Award winner John Cullum sings the song in character at a karaoke bar during the ER episode "Be Still My Heart".

The film version of the song is featured in the end credits to 50 First Dates where it accompanied the dedication to the late Stanley Sandler that was written by his son and 50 First Dates star Adam Sandler.

== Other versions ==
Broadway and recording star Robert Goulet considered it "a personal favorite", and a version by Jack Barlow charted at number 58 on Hot Country Songs. Other notable acts who have performed the song include:

- 101 Strings
- Ed Ames
- Baja Marimba Band
- Leon Bibb
- Art Blakey and the Jazz Messengers
- The Browns
- Arthur Conley
- Sam Cooke
- The Country Gentlemen
- Vic Damone
- Eddie Fisher
- Gila Bend
- Richard Kiley
- Frankie Laine
- Vaughan Monroe and his Orchestra
- Jim Nabors
- P.J. Proby
- John Raitt
- Pernell Roberts
- Zoot Sims
- Bryn Terfel
- Stan Wilson
- Earl Wrightson
