= Donald De Line =

American film producer (born 1957)

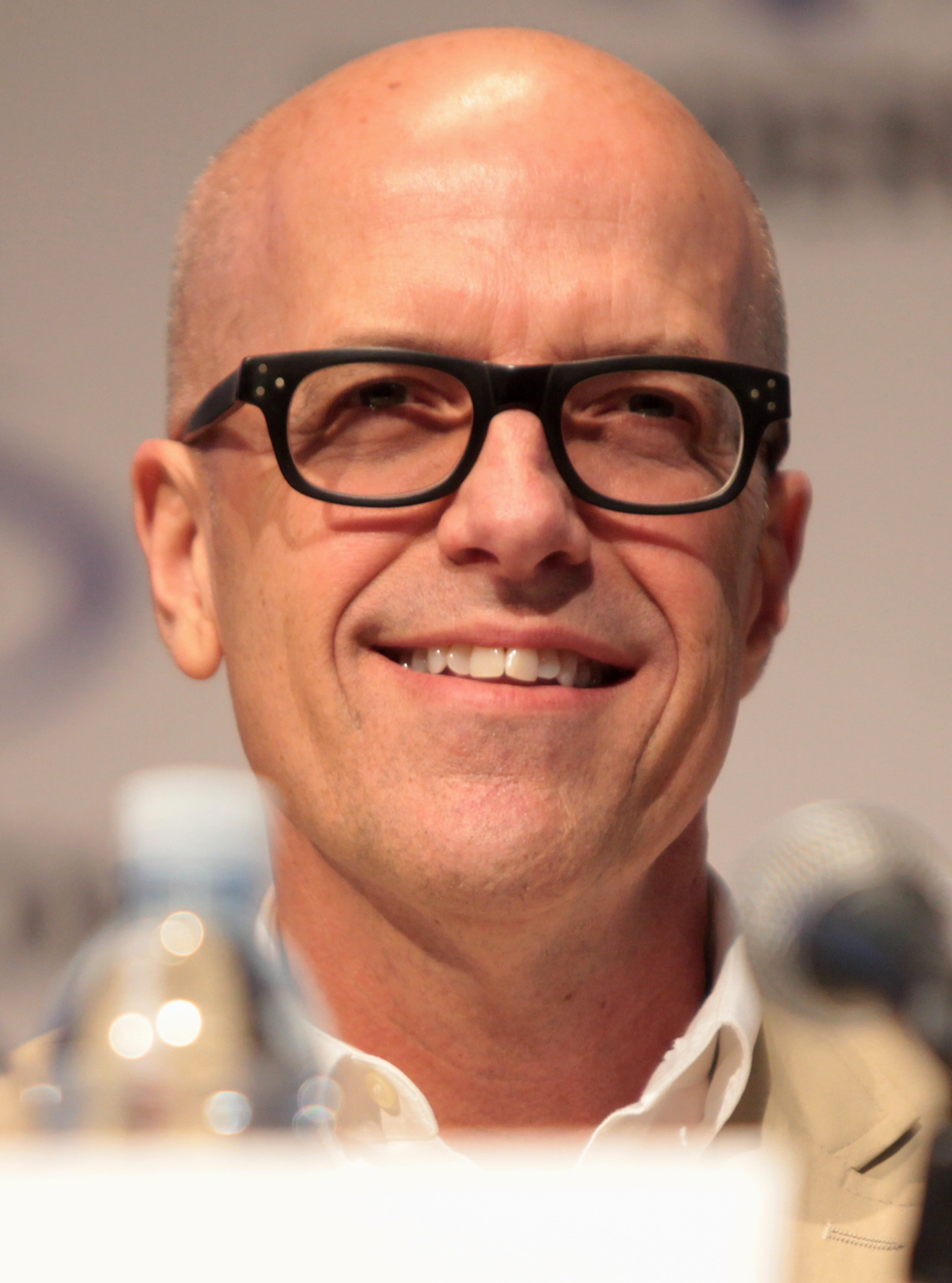
- De Line at WonderCon 2015
- Occupation: Film producer
- Years active: 1985–present

Donald De Line (or Donald DeLine) is an American film producer. He was formerly the head of production at Paramount Pictures. He began his career as a studio executive at Walt Disney Productions and its Touchstone Pictures division in 1985, eventually serving as Disney's vice-president of production. He is a native of La Jolla, a community of San Diego, California. His well-known films have included Pretty Woman (1990), The Italian Job (2003), and Body of Lies (2008).

== Career ==
- 1985 — Began career at Disney as director of production
- 1990 — Appointed senior vice president, production, for Touchstone Pictures
- 1991 — Promoted to executive vice president of Touchstone
- 1998 — Established DeLine Pictures

== Filmography ==
He was a producer in all films unless otherwise noted.

=== Film ===
Year	Film	Credit	Notes	Ref.
2001	Domestic Disturbance			
2003	The Italian Job			
2004	The Stepford Wives			
2004	Without a Paddle			
2008	Fool's Gold			
2008	Body of Lies			
2009	I Love You, Man			
2009	Observe and Report			
2010	Legend of the Guardians: The Owls of Ga'Hoole	Executive producer		
2010	Burlesque			
2010	Yogi Bear			
2011	Green Lantern: Emerald Knights		Direct-to-video	
2011	Green Lantern			
2013	Pain & Gain			
2017	Going in Style			
2018	Ready Player One			
2022	Don't Make Me Go			

Studio executive

Year	Film	Ref.
1990	Pretty Woman	
1991	What About Bob?	
1996	Ransom	

Thanks

Year	Film	Role
2008	Smother	Thanks

=== Television ===
Year	Title	Credit	Ref.
2015−16	Wayward Pines	Executive producer	
2021	Chapelwaite	Executive producer	
2022	Billy the Kid	Executive producer	
