= Gray Matter (film) =

- Directed by: Meko Winbush
- Written by: Philip Gelatt
- Produced by: Jeanette Volturno; Yolanda T. Cochran; Jessica Malanaphy
- Starring: Mia Isaac; Jessica Frances Dukes; Garret Dillahunt
- Cinematography: Andrew Jeric
- Edited by: Byron Wong
- Music by: Haim Mazar
- Distributed by: HBO Max
- Release date: July 13, 2023
- Running time: 87 minutes
- Country: United States
- Language: English

Gray Matter is a 2023 American science fiction thriller drama film written by Philip Gelatt, directed by Meko Winbush and starring Mia Isaac, Jessica Frances Dukes and Garret Dillahunt. It is Winbush's feature directorial debut.

== Plot ==
16-year-old Aurora longs for a normal life, but must first learn to control her psychic powers.

== Cast ==
- Jessica Frances Dukes as Ayla
- Mia Isaac as Aurora
- Garret Dillahunt as Derek
- Andrew Liner as Isaiah
- Isabella Ferreira as Calah

== Release ==
The film was released on HBO Max on July 13, 2023.

== Reception ==
The film has a 17% rating on Rotten Tomatoes based on six reviews. Proma Khosla of IndieWire graded the film a B−.

Elisabeth Vincentelli of The New York Times gave the film a negative review, describing it as "by-the-numbers, by-committee product."
