= Don't Make Me Go (film) =

- Official release poster
- Directed by: Hannah Marks
- Written by: Vera Herbert
- Produced by: Donald De Line; Peter Saraf; Leah Holzer
- Starring: John Cho; Mia Isaac
- Cinematography: Jaron Presant
- Edited by: Paul Frank
- Music by: Jessica Rose Weiss
- Production companies: Amazon Studios; De Line Pictures; Big Beach; Reunion Pacific Entertainment
- Distributed by: Amazon Studios
- Release dates: June 13, 2022 (Tribeca); July 15, 2022 (United States)
- Running time: 109 minutes
- Country: United States
- Language: English
- Budget: $15.1 million

Don't Make Me Go is a 2022 American road trip film directed by Hannah Marks, written by Vera Herbert, and starring John Cho and Mia Isaac. It premiered at the Tribeca Film Festival on June 13, 2022, and was released on Amazon Prime Video on July 15, 2022.

== Plot ==
After discovering that he has a terminal disease, a single father takes his reluctant teenage daughter on a cross country road trip to find her estranged mother, as he tries to teach her everything she might need to know for the rest of her life along the way.

== Cast ==
- John Cho as Max Park
- Mia Isaac as Wally Park
- Kaya Scodelario as Annie
- Josh Thomson as Guy Connelly
- Otis Dhanji as Glenn
- Stefania LaVie Owen as Sandra
- Mitchell Hope as Rusty
- Jen Van Epps as Nicole
- Jemaine Clement as Dale Angelo
- Hannah Marks as Tessa

== Production ==
The script written by Vera Herbert was on the 2012 Black List of the most-liked unproduced screenplays in Hollywood. The first draft was dated June 8, 2012, and it was originally titled A Story About My Father. On March 24, 2021, Amazon Studios signed on to develop the film, with Hannah Marks set to direct and Herbert writing and executive producing the film, with Donald De Line, Peter Saraf, and Leah Holzer producing.

On March 24, 2021, it was announced that John Cho had been cast in the film. On April 13, 2021, it was announced that Mia Isaac had joined the cast, and Kaya Scodelario joined the cast on August 13, 2021. The story was originally written for a White family, but the director, Hannah Marks felt that Cho was best suited for the role after seeing him in a previous father role in Searching. And after Isaac joined, Marks said, "We did adapt the script in certain areas to feel like it was customized to them."

Filming commenced in New Zealand in May 2021. Production design is by New Zealand-born production designer Felicity Abbott.

== Release ==
The film premiered at the Tribeca Film Festival on June 13, 2022, and was released on Prime Video on July 15, 2022.

== Reception ==
The film received mixed reviews from critics. Review aggregator website Rotten Tomatoes rated it 53% based on 60 reviews with an average rating of 5.8/10. The critical consensus reads, "John Cho and Mia Isaac are an appealing pair of leads, but Don't Make Me Go is one road trip movie that follows an overly familiar path."

Kate Erbland of IndieWire gave the film a B, calling it "a joy, heartbreaking and heartening in equal measure." Angie Han of The Hollywood Reporter called it "a solidly likable drama, anchored by lovely, lived-in chemistry between John Cho and Mia Isaac as a father-daughter duo," but added that "a misguided third-act choice throws off its bittersweet vibe, leaving a distinctly sour aftertaste." Michael Nordine of Variety also criticized the film's third act as "questionable."

== Accolades ==
Don't Make Me Go was nominated for Best Production Design at the 2023 British Film Designers Guild Awards.
