= Jack Barlow =

American country music singer-songwriter (1924–2011)

- Also known as: Zoot Fenster
- Born: Jack Harold Butcher; May 18, 1924; Moline, Illinois, U.S.
- Origin: Nashville, Tennessee, U.S.
- Died: July 29, 2011 (aged 87)
- Genres: Country
- Occupation: Singer-songwriter
- Instrument: Vocals
- Years active: 1965–2007
- Labels: Dial, Epic, Dot, Antique

Jack Harold Butcher (May 18, 1924 – July 29, 2011), better known as Jack Barlow, was an American country music singer and songwriter. He recorded on Dot Records during the 1960s and 1970s, charting seven times on Hot Country Songs.

Barlow first worked as a disc jockey before moving to Nashville, Tennessee. His first single was "I Love Country", which reached number 21 on Cash Box in 1965. Barlow later moved to Epic Records, then to Dot Records, charting on Billboard for the first time in 1968 with "Baby, Ain't That Love". His highest chart entry came in late 1971 to early 1972, when he took "Catch the Wind" to number 26. This was followed by a recording of "They Call the Wind Maria", from the 1969 Clint Eastwood film Paint Your Wagon. Then in the mid 1970s Jack recorded a series of radio and TV commercials for Big Red chewing gum by Wrigley’s.

Barlow's last charting release was "The Man on Page 602", credited to Zoot Fenster. The song is about an image found in a 1975 Sears catalog, of a man modeling boxer shorts who appears to be inadvertently exposing his genitalia. Barlow continued to record until 2007, also singing commercial jingles and doing voice-over work. He died in mid-2011 from an undisclosed illness.

== Discography ==
=== Albums ===
| Title | Album details |
|---|---|
| Baby, Ain't That Love | Release date: 1969; Label: Dot Records DLP – 25923; Format: LP |
| Son of the South | Release date: 1969; Label: Dot Records DLP – 25958; Format: LP |
| Catch the Wind | Release date: 1970; Label: Dot Records DLP-25995; Format: LP |
| I Live the Country Songs I Sing | Release date: 1975/2007; Label: Antique Records; Format: Album/CD |

=== Singles ===
| Year | Single | Peak chart positions | |
| Year | Single | US Country | CAN Country |
|---|---|---|---|
| 1965 | "I Love Country Music" | — | — |
| 1968 | "Baby, Ain't That Love" | 40 | — |
| 1969 | "Birmingham Blues" | 55 | — |
| 1969 | "Nobody Wants to Hear It Like It Is" | 68 | — |
| 1971 | "Dayton, Ohio" | 59 | — |
| 1971 | "Catch the Wind" | 26 | 19 |
| 1972 | "They Call the Wind Maria" | 58 | — |
| 1973 | "Oh Woman" | 55 | — |
| 1975 | "The Man on Page 602" (as Zoot Fenster) | 30 | — |
