= Fire (Stewart novel) =

1948 novel

- Cover of 1948 edition
- Author: George R. Stewart
- Language: English
- Genre: Natural disaster
- Publisher: Random House (1948), New York Review Books (2024)
- Publication date: 1948, 2024
- Publication place: United States
- Media type: Print (Paperback and hardback)
- Pages: 312
- ISBN: 978-1681378473 (2024 edition)

Fire is a 1948 realistic novel by George R. Stewart about a large fictional wildfire (the Spitcat Fire) in California in the mid 20th century, and the various people involved in fighting it. It was a Book of the Month Club selection.

Fire was republished in 2024 by NYRB Classics and was the August 2024 selection of the NYRB Classics Book Club (the novel had also been republished in 1974 by Ballantine Books and 1984 by the University of Nebraska Press).

Stewart had spent a week working in a fire lookout tower in 1945, and to research the novel he worked alongside Forest Service rangers, at one point even disguising himself in a group of drunks to get picked up on a day crew (such crews were hired for emergency firefighting service in the novel), constructed a three-dimensional plaster relief map he could consult for accuracy, and had his work vetted for technical accuracy by rangers.

== Reviews ==
Visualizing Climate and Loss reviewed the republished novel, noting that the disastrous Spitcat Fire burned about 10,000 acres, weak tea compared to 21st century wildfires, some of which have burnt about a million acres each, and ended with "Fire... is also a work of realism, an ecological novel that unfolds in the interior of a flaming disaster. It is a book for our times, and for a burning earth. Andrew Schenker in The Baffler wrote "George R. Stewart’s ecofictions forecasted today’s calamities."

Christine Smallwood, in The Nation, wrote "[Stewart] is at once a chronicler of the achievements and architectures of modern civilization and an ecological fatalist"; Matthew Sherrill, speaking of Stewart's work generally (including Fire) in Harper's Magazine wrote "Stewart’s body of work feels proleptically tailored to an era of catastrophic ecological decline, one in which the earth may very well abide, but our own human prospects look considerably more doubtful". John Hay wrote an extensive review of the 2024 edition in Alta Online, agreeing with Emma Rothschild's statement, in the introduction to the 2024 republishing, that "[Fire] is a book for our times", as Stewart "[A]nticipates modern eco-fiction by privileging the nonhuman elements of climate and environment over the agency of human beings".

On the literary merits specifically, Hay's review was mixed, saying "[S]ome of the dialogue has a 'golly gee' flavor reminiscent of a Hardy Boys mystery or an episode of Lassie"), but praised others ("Stewart’s impressive attention to detail... [a]nd the obvious courage it takes to fight a wildfire keeps the action compelling. The characters in Fire are not terribly complex, but they display an admirable charm in their understated daring... There is a Wes Anderson–like quality to Stewart’s writing that may appeal to many modern readers"), while Josephine Miles (reviewing the earlier edition) had "Fire… materializes dramatis personae out of the powers of nature", while Visualizing Climate and Loss characterized Fire as "captivating".
