= George R. Stewart =

American novelist

George Rippey Stewart
- Stewart's books about U.S. highways were based on his cross-country drives of 1924, 1949 and 1950.
- Born: May 31, 1895; Sewickley, Pennsylvania, U.S.
- Died: August 22, 1980 (aged 85); San Francisco, California, U.S.
- Occupations: Historian; novelist; toponymist; professor

Academic background
- Education: Princeton University (BA); University of California, Berkeley (MA); Columbia University (PhD)

George Rippey Stewart Jr. (May 31, 1895 – August 22, 1980) was an American historian, toponymist, novelist, and a professor of English at the University of California, Berkeley. His 1959 book Pickett's Charge, a detailed history of the final attack at the Battle of Gettysburg, was termed "essential for an understanding of the Battle of Gettysburg". His 1949 post-apocalyptic novel Earth Abides won the first International Fantasy Award in 1951.

== Early life and university career ==
Stewart was born in Sewickley, Pennsylvania, to engineer George Rippey Stewart Sr., who designed gasworks and electric railways and later became a citrus "rancher" in Southern California, and Ella Wilson Stewart. The younger Stewart earned a bachelor's degree from Princeton University in 1917, an MA from the University of California, Berkeley, and his Ph.D. in English literature from Columbia University in 1922. He accepted a job with the English department at Berkeley in 1923. After his father died, he stopped using the "Jr." with his name.

Stewart was a founding member of the American Name Society in 1956–57. He once served as an expert witness in a murder trial as a specialist in family names. His best-known academic work is Names on the Land: A Historical Account of Place-Naming in the United States (1945; reprinted, New York Review Books, 2008). He wrote three other books on names: A Concise Dictionary of American Place-Names (1970), Names on the Globe (1975), and American Given Names (1979). His scholarly works concerning the poetic meter of ballads (published using the name George R. Stewart Jr.), beginning with his 1922 Ph.D. dissertation at Columbia, remain important.

== Works ==
As an author, Stewart's output was diverse. Ordeal by Hunger, Pickett's Charge, and other works are examinations of American history. Earth Abides was a science fiction novel about the destruction of civilization, in which everything formerly taken for granted about civilization and the situation of human beings in their environment can no longer be assumed.

East Of Giants is historical fiction. Man, an Autobiography is one of the very few works of speculative anthropology, in which he attempts to deduce how major developments of prehistorical civilization must have happened. Good Lives provides a series of biographical sketches with the purpose of determining what it is that makes for a good life. Not So Rich As You Think (1968) was a prescient early essay in environmentalism. Storm (1941) uses an immense storm as its protagonist, an extraordinary departure in itself.

Years of the City is concerned with the factors that result in the development and decay of civilizations.

For Earth Abides (1949) he won the inaugural International Fantasy Award for fiction in 1951. It was dramatized by the radio program Escape and served as an inspiration for Stephen King's The Stand, as King has stated. The Encyclopedia of Science Fiction terms it "one of the finest of all Post-Holocaust/Ruined Earth novels". It was adapted for television in 2024.

His 1941 novel Storm inspired Alan Jay Lerner and Frederick Loewe to write the song "They Call the Wind Maria" for their 1951 musical Paint Your Wagon.

Storm was dramatized as A Storm Called Maria on the November 2, 1959, episode of ABC's anthology television series Walt Disney Presents. Co-produced by Ken Nelson Productions, it blended newsreel footage of several different storms to represent the mega-storm of the novel and traced the storm from its origins in Japan to the coast of California. The cast included non-actors, among them the dam superintendent George Kritsky, the telephone lineman Walt Bowen, and the highway superintendent Leo Quinn.

Another novel, Fire (1948), and a historical work, Ordeal By Hunger (1936), also evoked environmental catastrophes.

== Bibliography ==
Cover of the 1979 Oxford University Press paperback edition of American Given Names.

- The Technique of English Verse (1930)
- Bret Harte: Argonaut and Exile (1931)
- English Composition, A Laboratory Course, (1936)
- Ordeal by Hunger: The Story of the Donner Party (1936; 2nd revised edition 1960; reprinted 1992). ISBN 978-0-395-61159-3
- John Phoenix (1937)
- East of the Giants (1938)
- Doctor's Oral (1939)
- Take Your Bible in One Hand: The life of William Henry Thomes, author of A whaleman's adventures on land and sea, Lewey and I, The bushrangers, A gold hunter's adventures, etc., 1939
- Storm (1941; reprinted 2003, 2021). ISBN 978-1-890771-74-4
- Names on the Land: A Historical Account of Place-Naming in the United States (1945; reprinted 1958, 1967 [Sentry paperback], 2008). ISBN 978-1-59017-273-5
- Man, an Autobiography (1946)
- Fire (1948; reprinted 2024)
- Earth Abides (1949; rpt. 2006). ISBN 978-0-345-48713-1
- The Year of the Oath (in collaboration) (1950)
- Sheep Rock (1951)
- The Opening of the California Trail: The Story of the Stevens Party by Moses Schallenberger, 1888; edited 1953
- U.S. 40: Cross Section of the United States of America (1953)
- American Ways of Life (1954)
- These Men My Friends (1954)
- To California by Covered Wagon (1954). Reprinted as Pioneers Go West (1987)
- The Years of the City (1955)
- N.A. 1: The North-South Continental Highway (1957)
- Pickett's Charge: A Microhistory of the Final Attack at Gettysburg, July 3, 1863, 1959 Revised in 1963.
- The California Trail (1962)
- Committee of Vigilance (1964)
- Good Lives (1967)
- Not So Rich As You Think (1968)
- The Department of English at the University of California, Berkeley (1968)
- A Concise Dictionary of American Place-Names (1970)
- Names on the Globe (1975)
- American Given Names (1979). ISBN 978-0-19-504040-1

== See also ==
- Tropical cyclone naming
- George R. Stewart Peak

== Sources ==
- "Scott, Donald, The Life and Truth of George R. Stewart; A Literary Biography of the Author of EARTH ABIDES"..
- "George R. Stewart, toponymist", Names, Volume 24, 1976, pp. 77–85.

=== Audio ===
- OTR Network Library: Escape: "Earth Abides", parts one and two
- Two short radio episodes from Storm (1941): "Valley Rain" and "Final Success". California Legacy Project.
