= Black Cake (TV series) =

2023 American TV series

- Created by: Marissa Jo Cerar
- Based on: Black Cake by Charmaine Wilkerson
- Starring: Mia Isaac; Adrienne Warren; Chipo Chung; Ashley Thomas; Lashay Anderson; Faith Alabi; Glynn Turman
- Original language: English
- No. of seasons: 1
- No. of episodes: 8

Production
- Executive producers: Oprah Winfrey; Marissa Jo Cerar; Aleksander Krutainis; Carla Gardini; Brian Morewitz
- Running time: 54–61 minutes
- Production companies: Harpo Films; Two Drifters; Kapital Entertainment; ABC Signature

Original release
- Network: Hulu
- Release: November 1 – December 6, 2023

Black Cake is an American drama television series. It is based on Charmaine Wilkerson's novel of the same name, and premiered on Hulu in 2023. It stars Chipo Chung, Mia Isaac, Adrienne Warren, Ashley Thomas and Glynn Turman. The show was produced by Harpo Productions, with Oprah Winfrey as one of the main executive producers. It received generally positive reviews from critics.

Black Cake was canceled after one season.

== Premise ==
Two siblings learn about their late mother's dark past after she leaves her recordings to them.

== Cast ==
=== Main ===
- Chipo Chung as Eleanor Bennett
- Mia Isaac as Coventina "Covey" Lyncook
- Adrienne Warren as Benny Bennett
- Ashley Thomas as Byron Bennett
- Lashay Anderson as Bunny Pringle
- Faith Alabi as Pearl Thomas
- Glynn Turman as Charles Mitch
- Ahmed Elhaj as Gibbs Grant

=== Recurring ===
- Jade Eshete as Mathilda
- Jeremiah Birkett as Bert Bennett
- Rupert Evans as Everett
- Lorenzo Bulgin as Percival Henry
- Anthony Mark Barrow as Clarence "Little Man" Henry
- Simon Wan as Lin
- Karise Yansen as Eleanor "Elly" Douglas
- Elliot Cowan as Steve
- Sonita Henry as Mabel Mathilda Martin

== Episodes ==
No.	Title	Directed by	Teleplay by	Original release date
1	"Covey"	Natalia Leite	Marissa Jo Cerar	November 1, 2023
2	"Coventina"	Natalia Leite	Teleplay by : Heather Jeng Bladt; Story by : Marissa Jo Cerar & Heather Jeng Bladt	November 1, 2023
3	"Eleanor"	Natalia Leite	Marissa Jo Cerar & Ihuoma Ofordire	November 1, 2023
4	"Mrs. Bennett"	Tara Nicole Weyr	Kara Smith	November 8, 2023
5	"Mother"	Tara Nicole Weyr	Hayley Tyler	November 15, 2023
6	"Ma"	Mario Van Peebles	Yasmin Almanaseer	November 22, 2023
7	"Birth Mother"	Zetna Fuentes	Marissa Jo Cerar & Hayley Tyler	November 29, 2023
8	"Nine Night"	Zetna Fuentes	Marissa Jo Cerar	December 6, 2023

== Release ==
The trailer of Black Cake was released on October 2, 2023. The television series premiered on Hulu in the United States, Disney+ under the Star banner internationally and Star+ In Latin America. on November 1, 2023.

== Reception ==
=== Critical response ===
On the review aggregator website Rotten Tomatoes, 93% of 15 critics' reviews are positive, with an average rating of 6.80/10. The website's consensus reads: "Cleverly plotted and viscerally well-acted, Black Cake is an engrossing drama that can have its surprising twists and eat them, too." On Metacritic, the series has a score of 68 out of 100, based on 9 reviews, indicating "generally favorable reviews".

Ronda Racha Penrice of TheWrap described Black Cake as groundbreaking and entertaining, praised the performances of the cast, and said, "It cracks open the door for never-ending narrative possibilities for truly diverse and dynamic stories." Judy Berman of Time stated Black Cake is one of the few examples of a show in which the "floridly emotional tone serves the story," praised the performances of the actors, and complimented how the television series approaches the concept of family secrets.

=== Accolades ===
Black Cake was one of 200 television series that received the ReFrame Stamp for the years 2023 to 2024. The stamp is awarded by the gender equity coalition ReFrame and industry database IMDbPro for film and television projects that are proven to have gender-balanced hiring, with stamps being awarded to projects that hire female-identifying people, especially women of color, in four out of eight key roles for their production.

Year	Award	Category	Nominee(s)	Result	Ref.
2024	Black Reel Awards	Outstanding Drama Series	Black Cake	Nominated	
2024	Black Reel Awards	Outstanding Directing in a Drama Series	Black Cake	Nominated	
2024	GLAAD Media Awards	Outstanding Limited or Anthology Series	Black Cake	Nominated	
2024	Humanitas Prize	Drama Teleplay	Marissa Jo Cerar	Won	
2024	NAACP Image Awards	Outstanding Drama Series	Black Cake	Nominated	
2024	NAACP Image Awards	Outstanding Writing in a Dramatic Series	Marissa Jo Cerar	Nominated	
