= Jessica Frances Dukes =

American actress

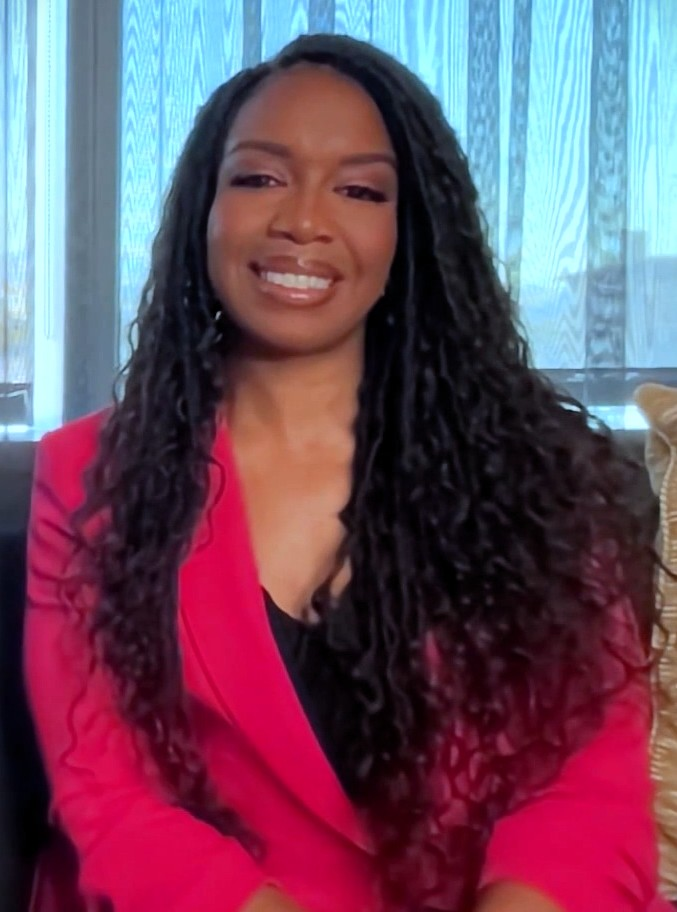
Dukes in 2024

Jessica Frances Dukes (born 23 December, 1980) is an American actress. She portrayed Special Agent Maya Miller in the Netflix series Ozark. She also played a lead in the 2023 film Gray Matter.

== Filmography ==
=== Film ===
Year	Title	Role	Notes
2017	Bernard and Huey	Courtesa	
2019	Look at Lucas	Lacey	short film
2020	16 Bars	Shanice	
2020	We Got This	Maye	Short film
2023	Organ Trail	Nora	
2023	Gray Matter	Ayla	
2024	Outbreak	Helen	

=== Television ===
Year	Title	Role	Notes
2015	The Good Wife	Nicole Willis	1 episode
2017	NCIS: New Orleans	Tour Guide	1 episode
2018	New Amsterdam	Rhonda Tewkes	1 episode
2019	Jessica Jones	Grace	6 episodes
2020–2022	Ozark	Special Agent Maya Miller	24 episodes
2024	Earth Abides	Emma	
2025	The Gilded Age	Athena Trumbo	Season 3
2026	The Westies	Birdie Polk	

=== Awards and nominations ===
Year	Award	Category	Nominated work	Result
2021	Screen Actors Guild Awards	Outstanding Performance by an Ensemble in a Drama Series (shared with the cast)	Ozark	Nominated
2023	Screen Actors Guild Awards	Outstanding Performance by an Ensemble in a Drama Series (shared with the cast)	Ozark	Nominated
