= Storm (Stewart novel) =

1941 novel by George R. Stewart

First edition (publ. Random House)

Storm is a novel written by George Rippey Stewart and published in 1941. The book became a best-seller and helped lead to the naming of tropical cyclones worldwide, even though the titular storm is extratropical. The book is divided into twelve chapters: one chapter for each day of the storm's existence.

== Plot summary ==
In January 1935, a cyclone develops in the Pacific Ocean near Japan, and becomes a significant storm as it moves toward California. The storm, named "Maria" by the (unnamed) Junior Meteorologist at the San Francisco Weather Bureau Office, becomes a blizzard that threatens the Sierra Nevada range with snowfall amounts of 20 feet (6.1 m). The storm's beneficial effects include averting a locust plague and ending a drought. Its harmful effects include flooding a valley near Sacramento, endangering a plane, stalling a train, and leading to the deaths of 16 people. It spawns a new cyclone, which significantly affects New York.

== Pronunciation of "Maria" ==
In 1947, Stewart wrote a new introduction for a reprint of the book, and discussed the pronunciation of "Maria": "The soft Spanish pronunciation is fine for some heroines, but our Maria here is too big for any man to embrace and much too boisterous." He went on to say, "So put the accent on the second syllable, and pronounce it 'rye'".

== Legacy ==
This book was the inspiration for the Lerner and Loewe song "They Call the Wind Maria", performed in the musical Paint Your Wagon, which followed Stewart's preferred pronunciation. It also prompted the National Weather Service to use personal names to designate storms.

Storm was dramatized as A Storm Called Maria on the November 2, 1959 episode of ABC's Walt Disney Presents. Co-produced by Ken Nelson Productions, it blended newsreel footage of several different storms to represent the mega-storm in the novel and traced the storm from its origins in Japan to the coast of California. The cast included non-actors, among them the dam superintendent George Kritsky, the telephone lineman Walt Bowen, and the highway superintendent Leo Quinn.

The name Maria would later be put into the name cycle of cyclones, presumably as a tribute. It was retired from the Atlantic hurricane naming list after Hurricane Maria killed 3,057 people in 2017.

== Sequel ==
Stewart's novel Fire (1948) was a sequel to Storm, again featuring the life of the (former) Junior Meteorologist, who was now a World War II veteran and had been promoted. Dealing with a California wildfire, it also used the backdrop of an environmental catastrophe to disclose the personal struggles and triumphs of individual human beings.

== See also ==
- Tropical cyclone
- Tropical cyclone naming
