= Charmaine Wilkerson =

Jamaican-American journalist, writer and author

- Born: New York, United States
- Education: Barnard College; Stanford University
- Occupations: Journalist and author
- Notable work: Black Cake (2022)
- Website: charmspen.com

Charmaine Wilkerson is a Jamaican-American journalist, writer, and author. She is known for her debut novel, Black Cake, which was a New York Times Bestseller.

== Personal life ==
Wilkerson is originally from New York. She has moved around a lot in her own life. She spent much of her childhood living in Jamaica and some time as an adult living in Los Angeles. She currently lives in Rome, where she has been living for over two decades.

Wilkerson's father is Caribbean-American. Her mother was born and raised in Jamaica. Her father was a textile artist.

Wilkerson attended Barnard College at just 16 years old and graduated with a B.A. in linguistics. She then went on to study at Stanford University's graduate program in communications.

== Career ==
Wilkerson spent much of her career as a journalist. She began her reporting in California in a major agricultural area. For a period, she also worked for a United Nations agency with a focus on agriculture, poverty reduction, and hunger reduction.

As a writer, Wilkerson has published a number of short stories. Her debut novel, Black Cake, was released in 2022.

=== Black Cake ===
Her first novel was published in 2022. Black Cake was a New York Times bestseller, a Read With Jenna book club pick, and a Book of the Month club pick.

Before the novel was even published, the TV rights were purchased by Oprah Winfrey's production company, Harpo Films, as the result of a bidding war. The on-screen adaptation was developed as a Hulu series, released in 2023.

With her debut novel, Wilkerson wanted to relay the importance and ability of transferring culture and stories through food. Black cake is a Caribbean food that Wilkerson's own mother made, though they called it rum pudding. Wilkerson herself bakes the dessert once a year.

== Published works ==
- Black Cake (2022)
- Deluge (2023)
- Good Dirt (2025)
