= Mia Isaac =

American actress (born 2004)

- Born: May 24, 2004 (age 22); Atlanta, Georgia, U.S.
- Occupation: Actress
- Years active: 2019–present

Mia Wei-Ming Isaac (born May 25, 2004) is an American actress who made her debut in the 2019 TV movie Lovestruck, followed by her performances in Not Okay, Don't Make Me Go, Gray Matter, and the Hulu miniseries Black Cake, which earned praise from critics.

== Early life ==
Isaac was born and raised in Atlanta, Georgia. She attended Springdale Park Elementary School, Inman Middle School, and Midtown High School.

== Filmography ==
=== Film ===
Year	Title	Role	Notes
2022	Don't Make Me Go	Wally Park	
2022	Not Okay	Rowan Aldren	
2023	Gray Matter	Aurora	

=== Television ===
Year	Title	Role	Notes
2019	Lovestruck	Claire	Television movie
2023	Black Cake	Coventina "Covey" Lyncook	7 episodes, recurring role
2024	The Perfect Couple	Chloe Carter	Mini series, recurring role
2024	American Horror Stories	Claire Michaels	Episode: "X"
TBA	Life Is Strange	Kate Marsh	Main role
