= Peter Raeburn =

British composer, music producer and songwriter

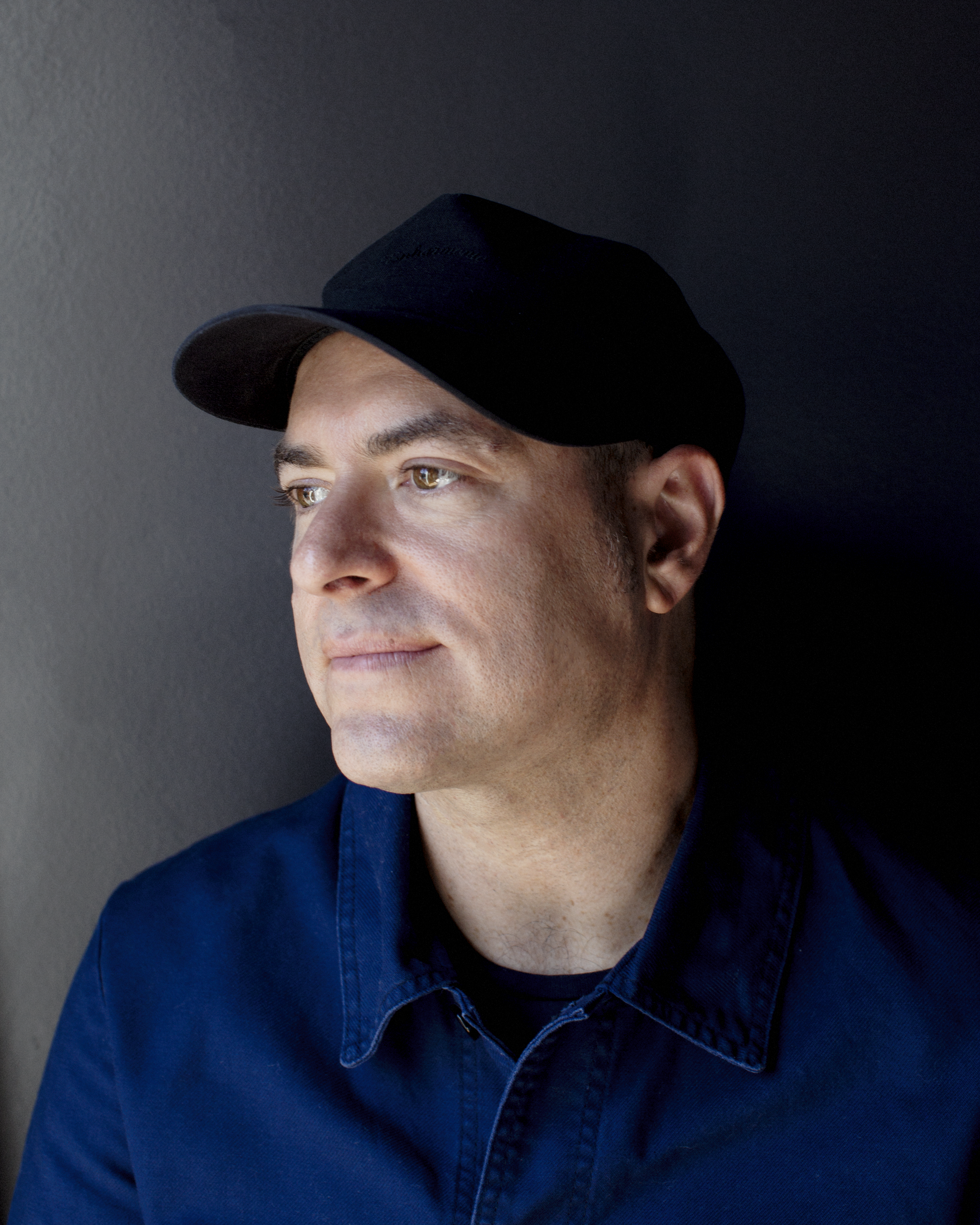
- Born: Johannesburg, South Africa
- Occupations: Composer; music producer; songwriter; creative director; recording artist
- Years active: 1995–present

Peter Raeburn is a British composer, music producer and songwriter. He has won over 70 awards across the various mediums in which he has worked.

As a composer, Raeburn has written the score for a variety of feature films including The Dry (dir. Robert Connelly) starring Eric Bana for Made Up Stories, Photograph (dir. Ritesh Batra) released by Amazon, Things Heard & Seen (dir. Shari Springer Berman and Robert Pulcini ) for Netflix starring Amanda Seyfried, Samuel Goldwyn's Nancy (dir. Christina Choe) starring Andrea Risebrough & Steve Buscemi, A24's Woodshock (dir. Kate & Laura Mulleavy) starring Kirsten Dunst, Danny Huston's directorial debut feature The Last Photograph, and the film by director Joshua Leonard; The Lie.

He also composed the music for Raoul Martinez and Joshua Van Praag's documentary feature, Creating Freedom: Lottery of Birth, which was nominated for Best Documentary at Raindance Film Festival. His music features in Blue Valentine, starring Ryan Gosling and Michelle Williams.

Raeburn is also well known for his work with director Jonathan Glazer on his films Sexy Beast, Birth and the BAFTA nominated Under The Skin. Raeburn was instrumental in shaping the soundtrack of Lars Von Trier’s Breaking The Waves

In Television, Raeburn recently scored two series: Tell Me Your Secrets (created by Harriett Warner) for Amazon Prime and Hit & Run (created by Lior Raz, Avi Issacharoff, Dawn Prestwich & Nicole Yorkin) for Netflix.

Raeburn is the founder and Creative Director of internationally renowned Soundtree Music. His work includes iconic commercial spots, such as Guinness (Surfer/Bet on Black/Dreamclub), Sony (Music Pieces), Sony PlayStation (Mountain), Stella Artois (Ice Skating Priests), Levi's (Twist/Odyssey), IKEA (Beds) and Lurpak (Go Freestyle). Peter and Soundtree have also created soundtracks for The New York Times, The Guardian, Audi, Mercedes, Smirnoff, Nike. Adidas, Asics, On, Vodafone, Bacardi, Google, Apple and Samsung. He has won a multitude of the industry's most prestigious awards including numerous Cannes Lions, D&AD, BTA Craft Awards, Creative Circle and Clio awards.

Raeburn was musical director and producer on the charity album Township Sessions by The Mothers, which features songs as lyrical health messages created to educate communities in South Africa about essential health issues. This record raised essential funds for the community. He has also released four solo albums to date, You and Me, Scape, Note To Self, and Recovery.

He lives in Los Angeles with his wife and their two children.

== Notable work ==
=== Films ===
- The Confessional (Le Confessionnal) (1995) (special thanks)
- Breaking the Waves (1996) (music co-producer)
- Sexy Beast (2001) (music producer)
- Birth (2004) (music producer, supervisor and arranger)
- The Lie (2010) (composer and songwriter)
- Under the Skin (2013) (music producer, music supervisor and arranger)
- Mandela: Long Walk To Freedom (2013) (music consultant)
- Molly Moon and the Incredible Book of Hypnotism (2015) (composer and songwriter)
- Muerte Es Vida: Death is Life (2016) (composer)
- Dr. Del (2016) (composer)
- The Last Photograph (2017) (composer)
- Woodshock (2017) (composer)
- Nancy (2018) (composer, music producer and arranger)
- Behold My Heart (2018) (composer)
- Photograph (2019) (composer)
- Fully Realized Humans (2020) (composer)
- The Dry (film) (2021) (composer, music producer and arranger)
- Things Heard & Seen (2021) (composer)

=== Television ===
- Mr. Mkhizie's Portrait (Composer)
- Saturday's Shadow (2007) (Composer)
- Blink (1998) (Music producer and composer)
- Foreign John (2009) (Composer)
- Deep and Crisp and Even (2009) (Composer)
- Tell Me Your Secrets (2021) (composer)
- Hit & Run (2021) (composer)

=== Selected commercials ===
- Adidas - "Take It" (2015)
- Audi – "The Ring" (2013)
- Economist – Red Wires (2009)
- Ford – Go Find It (2009)
- Guinness – World (2009), Surfer, NoitulovE (2005), Bet on Black (2000)
- Honda – Jump
- IKEA - "Bed" (2014)
- Land Rover – "Elixir" (2014)
- Levi's – Twist
- Lurpak - "Go Freestyle" (2015)
- PlayStation 2 – Mountain
- PlayStation Vita – "The World in Play" (2012)
- Post Office – Just Another Day (2013)
- Royal Mail – Grow (2008)
- Smirnoff – Sea
- Sony Walkman – Music Pieces
- Stella Artois – Le Quest (2012), Ice Skating Priests (2006)
- Wispa – For The Love of Wispa
- Wrangler – Ride

=== Music ===
- Album: Peter Raeburn You And Me – Full album (Writer/Producer)
- Album Track: Wiley I Am The Sea – from the album 'See Clear Now' by Wiley (Writer/Producer)
- Album: The Mothers: Township Sessions (Musical Director/Producer)

== Awards ==
- BAFTA Film Awards (2015) 'Original Music' Nomination – 'Under the Skin'
- London Critics Circle Film Awards (2015) 'Technical Achievement of the Year' - Score – 'Under the Skin'
- Boston Online Film Critics Association (2014) 'Best Original Score' - 'Under the Skin'
- Chicago Film Critics Association Awards (2014) 'Best Original Score' – 'Under the Skin'
- European Film Awards (2014) 'Best Music' – 'Under the Skin'
- Florida Film Critics Circle Awards (2014) 'Best Score' – 'Under the Skin'
- Indiana Film Journalists Association, US (2014) 'Best Musical Score' – 'Under the Skin'
- Los Angeles Film Critics Association Awards (2014) 'Best Music' – 'Under the Skin'
- BTAA Craft Awards - Best Crafted Commercial (2014) - "Bed"
- British Independent Film Awards (2013) 'Best Technical Achievement' - Music – 'Under the Skin'
- BTAA Craft Awards – Best Use of Original Music (2013) – The Ring
- BTAA Craft Awards – Best Use of Recorded Music (7 Feb 2000) – Bet on Black
- D&AD Awards – Best Use of Music in TV & Cinema Advertising 7 February 2000 – Bet on Black
- Lion D'Or Cannes – Excellence in Music Award (7 Feb 2000) – Bet on Black
- Midsummer Awards – Best Use of Music (7 Feb 2000) – Bet on Black
- Finalist: BTAA Craft Awards – Best Use of Sound Design (7 Feb 2001) – Eggcentric
- Nominated: BTAA Craft Awards – Best Use of Sound (7 Feb 2001) – Eggcentric
- BTAA Craft Awards – Best Use of Recorded Music (23 Oct 2005) – Ice Skating Priests
- Creative Circle Awards – Best Use of Music (Gold) (23 May 2006) – Ice Skating Priests
- Midsummer Awards – Best Use of Music (Gold) (23 Jul 2006) – Ice Skating Priests
- BTAA Craft Awards – Best Use of Recorded Music (23 Oct 2004) – Mountain
- Creative Circle Awards Best Use of Music 23 July 2004 – Mountain
- D&AD Award – Best Use of Music in TV & Cinema Advertising (23 May 2004) – Mountain
- BTAA Awards – Best 60–90 Second TV Commercial (Gold) (14 Mar 2008) – Music Pieces
- D&AD Awards – Best Use of Music in TV & Cinema Crafts (16 May 2008) – Music Pieces
- Clio Awards – Use of Music (Silver) (19 May 2008) – Music Pieces
- Cannes Grand Prix (23 Jun 2006) – NoitulovE
- Creative Circle Awards – Best Use of Music (Silver) (23 May 2006) – NoitulovE
- Finalist: BTAA Craft Awards – Best Use of Recorded Music (26 Oct 2005) – Office
- BTAA Craft Awards – Best Original Music (24 Nov 2007) – Own The Road Again
- D&AD Awards – Best Use of Music (7 Feb 2001) – Ride
- Creative Circle Awards – Best Use of Sound (23 May 2000) – Surfer
- Voted No.1 British commercial of all time Channel 4 (23 Feb 2000) – Surfer
- D&AD Awards – Best Use of Music in TV & Cinema Advertising (23 May 2006) – Tuperzik
- BTAA Craft Awards – Best Use of Recorded Music (7 Feb 2001) – Twist
- Finalist: D&AD Awards – Best Use of Music (7 Feb 2001) – Twist
- Loerie Awards for Television & Cinema Advertising Crafts – Silver Award Music & Sound Design (7 Feb 2005) – Two Villages
- Finalist: BTAA Craft Awards – Best Use of Original Music (8 Feb 2007) – Wind
