= Dreamer (advertisement) =

Advertising campaign for Guinness beer

Dreamer / Dream Club
- Agency: Abbott Mead Vickers BBDO, London
- Client: Diageo
- Language: English
- Running time: 60 seconds
- Product: Guinness draught stout
- Release date: 6 April 2001
- Directed by: Jonathan Glazer
- Music by: Roger Williams ("So Nice (Summer Samba)")
- Production company: Academy Productions, London
- Produced by: Nick Morris; Yvonne Chalkley (agency producer)
- Country: United Kingdom
- Budget: £1 million (campaign)
- Preceded by: Bet on Black
- Followed by: Free In

Dreamer (also known as Dream Club) is an integrated advertising campaign launched by Diageo in 2001 to promote Guinness-brand draught stout in the United Kingdom. It is the fourth piece of the Good things come to those who wait campaign, following on from Swimblack, Surfer, and Bet on Black. As with the previous pieces of the campaign, Dreamer was handled by advertising agency Abbott Mead Vickers BBDO and comprised appearances in print, posters, and television and cinema spots. The centrepiece of the campaign was the sixty-second television and cinema commercial directed by Jonathan Glazer, who had also directed two of the three previous ads. Post-production work was completed by The Computer Film Company which animated the squirrel sequence. The piece was premiered on SKY television on 6 April 2001, appearing on terrestrial television channels the following day.

Dreamer was a middling success, with Guinness sales figures and market share holding steady during the period that the piece was broadcast, but failing to improve figures in the same way that earlier pieces of the campaign had achieved. It was to be the final piece of the Good Things campaign for several years, as Diageo made the decision to pursue more pan-European campaigns through the first half of the 2000s.

== Additional credits ==
- Account Executive: Clive Tanqueray
- Executive Creative Director: Peter Souter
- Creative Director / Copywriter / Art Director: Walter Campbell
- Director of Photography: Daniel Landin
- Production Designer: Chris Oddy
- Editor: Sam Sneade, Sam Sneade Editing, London
- Sound Design Company: Wave Studios, London
- Sound Designers: Johnnie Burn / Peter Raeburn
- Music Production Company: Soundtree Music, London
- Music Arranger: Peter Raeburn
- Animation Company / Computer Graphics: The Computer Film Company, London
