= Paint (advertisement) =

2006 television advertisement for Sony

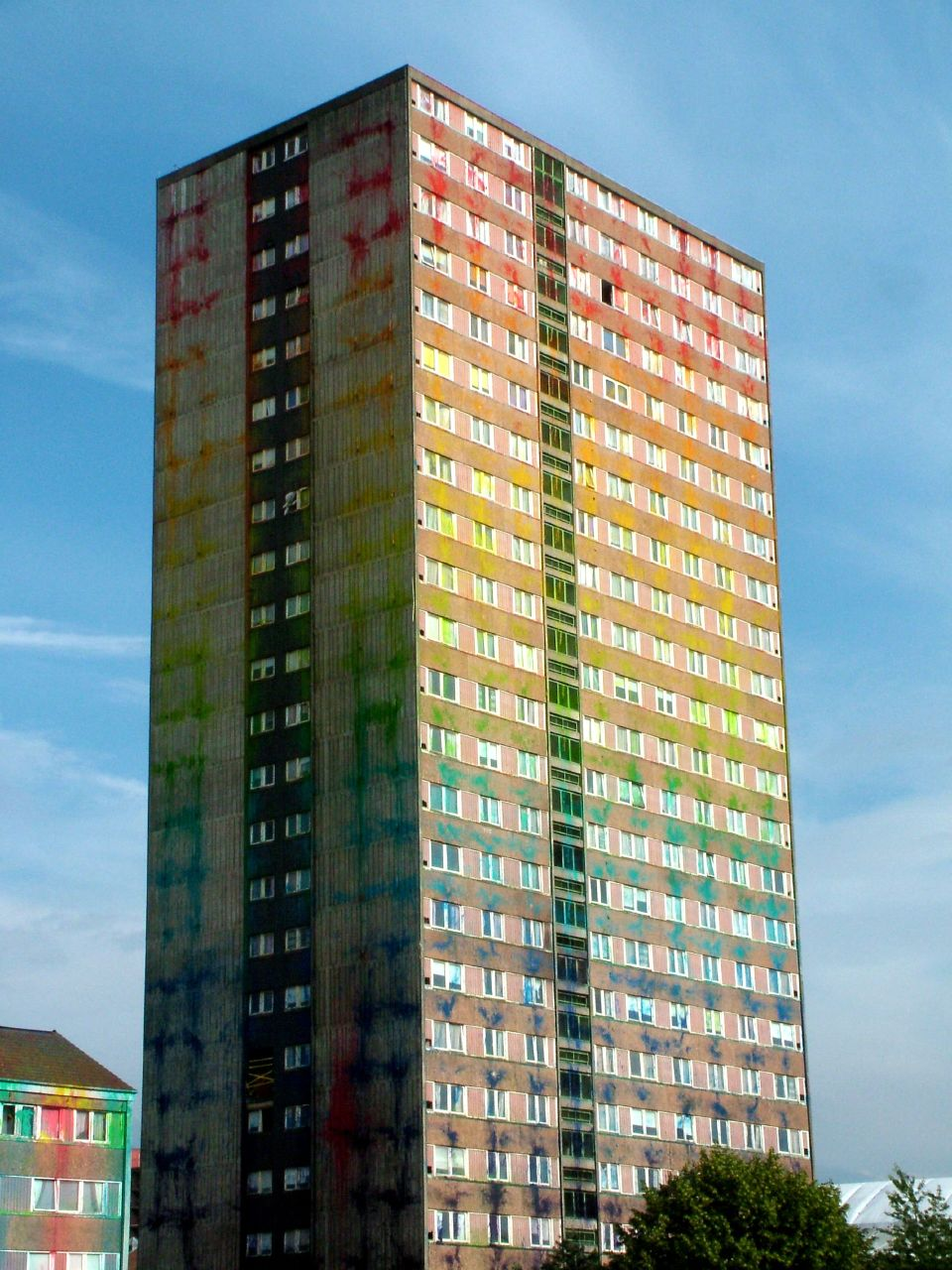
- A Glasgow tower block, the day after filming
- Agency: Fallon, London
- Client: Sony
- Language: English
- Running time: 70 seconds
- Product: Sony Bravia
- Release date: 17 October 2006 (television)
- Directed by: Jonathan Glazer
- Music by: "The Thieving Magpie" by Gioachino Rossini
- Production company: Academy, London
- Produced by: Simon Cooper
- Country: United Kingdom
- Budget: £2 million (campaign)
- Preceded by: Balls
- Followed by: Play-Doh
- Official website: bravia-advert.com at the Wayback Machine (archived 2007-04-30)

Paint is a 2006 television advertisement created for the Japanese technology company Sony. It was featured as part of the "Colour like no other" marketing campaign for the Sony Bravia high-definition LCD television. It was created as a successor to the brand's "Balls" advert which had gained a successful online following. Sony wanted to replicate that success and reward their newfound audience with more content. The advertisement was created by Fallon Worldwide and was produced by Simon Cooper and directed by Jonathan Glazer. The advert depicts a series of explosions of multi-coloured paints occurring on a tower block and residential houses, alongside mid-air explosions. An actor dressed as a clown also features in the advert amidst the exploding paints.

It was filmed in Toryglen in Glasgow, Scotland at a condemned tower block. A suitable location had been searched for in Europe until they found the derelict tower block. The production crew arranged the detonation of 70,000 litres of environmentally friendly multi-coloured paint via numerous explosions. Production used 1,700 detonators, additional mortars, cluster and bottle bombs in a series of stunts. Mid-air sequences were aided by the use of cranes suspending barrels of paint until their detonation. These were filmed via sixty-five different camera positions and could only be achieved during one take. The advert has a seventy second runtime and features the music, "The Thieving Magpie" by Gioachino Rossini. Soundtree Music composer, Peter Raeburn worked on the soundtrack and synchronised the music to the visuals. Fallon promoted the advert with an official website, which shared backstage filming videos and on-set photographs. They allowed spectators to record and take photos which were shared online, adding to the project's hype. The project had a reported budget of nearly two million pounds and premiered on 17 October 2006 in the UK.

Paint received Campaign magazine's "Campaign of the Year" award in 2006. In 2007 it won the "Best Commercial" at the 2007 British Television Advertising Awards and the D&AD Wood Pencil award. It has been praised for its ambitious large-scale production. Some critics believed it did not match the "warmth" and success of Balls, despite its grandeur. Sony later released a follow-up advert with 2007's Play-Doh advert. All three videos were later used in medical research about the effects on advertising has on the prefrontal cortex.

== Synopsis ==
Numerous explosions of paint occur around a residential tower block setting, alongside mid-air explosions of paint which mimic an orchestrated firework display. Paint is released in an upward trajectory on the tower block creating a reverse demolition effect. A clown dressed in a suit and orange wig is seen running for cover from the explosion as paint rains down. The advert ends when the music cuts and the addition of the slogan 'colour like no other' appears on screen.

== Production ==
=== Conception and filming ===
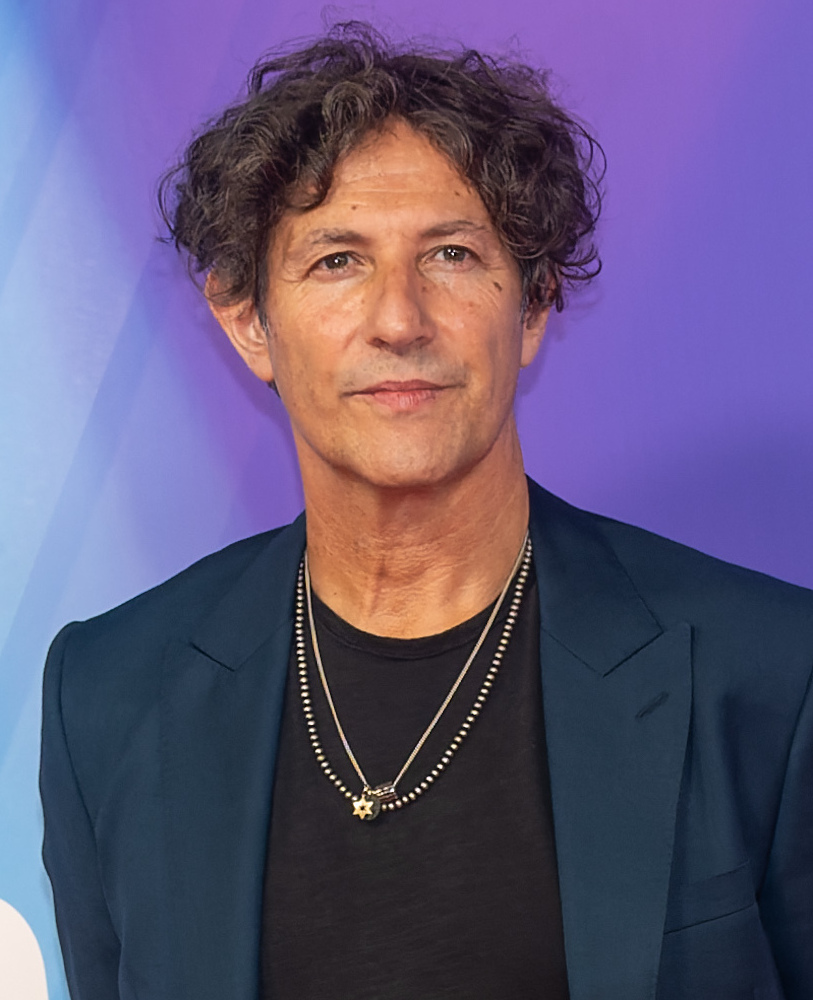
Paint was directed by Jonathan Glazer.

The advertisement "Paint" was conceived and created by the advertisement agency Fallon Worldwide for the Japanese technology company Sony. It formed part of the brand's "Colour like no other" marketing campaign for their range of Bravia high-definition LCD televisions. Sony faced difficulties in the music device sector with their Walkman music players, especially the direct competition from Apple Inc. and their iPod devices. Sony wanted to refocus their efforts on in other areas of the consumer electronics market. This prompted them to begin promoting their Bravia branded range of televisions as LCD televisions were expected to be a market leader. The advert was a successor to the brand's "Balls" advert and was followed by 2007's "Play-Doh" advert. Balls was proved to be a successful project for Sony and the subsequent online interest in the advert lead Sony to refocus their efforts into developing Paint, with the aim of achieving similar online success. Sony Europe's marketing SVP, David Patton explained that Sony wanted to reward those who took an interest in their advertising of Balls. He added they wanted to give their audience more content and offer them a behind-the-scenes perspective of filming.

The advert was produced by Simon Cooper and directed by Jonathan Glazer. Art direction was overseen by Juan Cabral and Richard Flintham, with the latter also assuming the role of creative director. It was filmed in July 2006. Paint took a total of ten days to film and 250 personnel were hired for the project. It was filmed at Queen's Court which is located in the Toryglen district of Glasgow, Scotland. The site was a former residential tower block which had been condemned and a controlled demolition had been planned. This also included some low-rise houses that were also planned for demolition. The production crew arranged the detonation of 70,000 litres of environmentally friendly paint via numerous explosions. This included 1,700 detonators, mortars and bottle bombs. This included 358 bottle bombs, 33 sextuple air cluster bombs, 22 triple hung cluster bombs, 268 mortars, 22 double mortars and 33 triple mortars. Also used in the stunt were 358 meters of weld, 330 meters of steel pipe and 57 km of copper wire. The detonations were filmed via sixty-five different camera positions. A crew of two-hundred people worked on-set during the production and filming. The amount of paint used was enough to cover Big Ben 609 times over. The main tower block used for filming was a 32 storey building that contained 132 flats, which were built in 1968. Glynn Henderson worked as the project's safety advisor and noted the production company had been scouting for potential filming locations across Europe. Henderson explained that the derelict site was ideal because it did not matter about the destruction the paint caused to the properties. Prior to filming, four months of tests were conducted to explore the effects and thickness of liquids Glazer needed to achieve his vision. Firework display technicians were hired to help achieve the visual effect of a firework display.

The paint used was water-based, environmentally friendly and non-toxic. BBC News reported that the paint was "safe enough to drink". It was delivered to Toryglen in large trucks and was then mixed on-site by twenty employees. Numerous barrels of paint were fixed to the side of the tower block. Other explosions occurred mid-air and these were achieved by suspending barrels from cranes. In the surrounding area houses were still occupied and these were covered in large canvas sheets to protect them from the paint. The film crew were splatted with paint and wore disposable boiler suits. Cameras were protected with plastic sheeting and umbrellas were used to provide cover. Due to the complexity involved in the stunt, the film crew could only record the advert in one take. The advert's producer, Cooper told a BBC News reporter that "it's hard to think of any other commercial in recent history that was as ambitious from just a logistical, technical point of view, of making all that work in those six seconds. Very satisfying to be part of." Filming of the advert was watched by hundreds of spectators. Local residents in nearby homes were given all expenses paid for trips to the seaside and discos to compensate for the disruption to their neighbourhood.

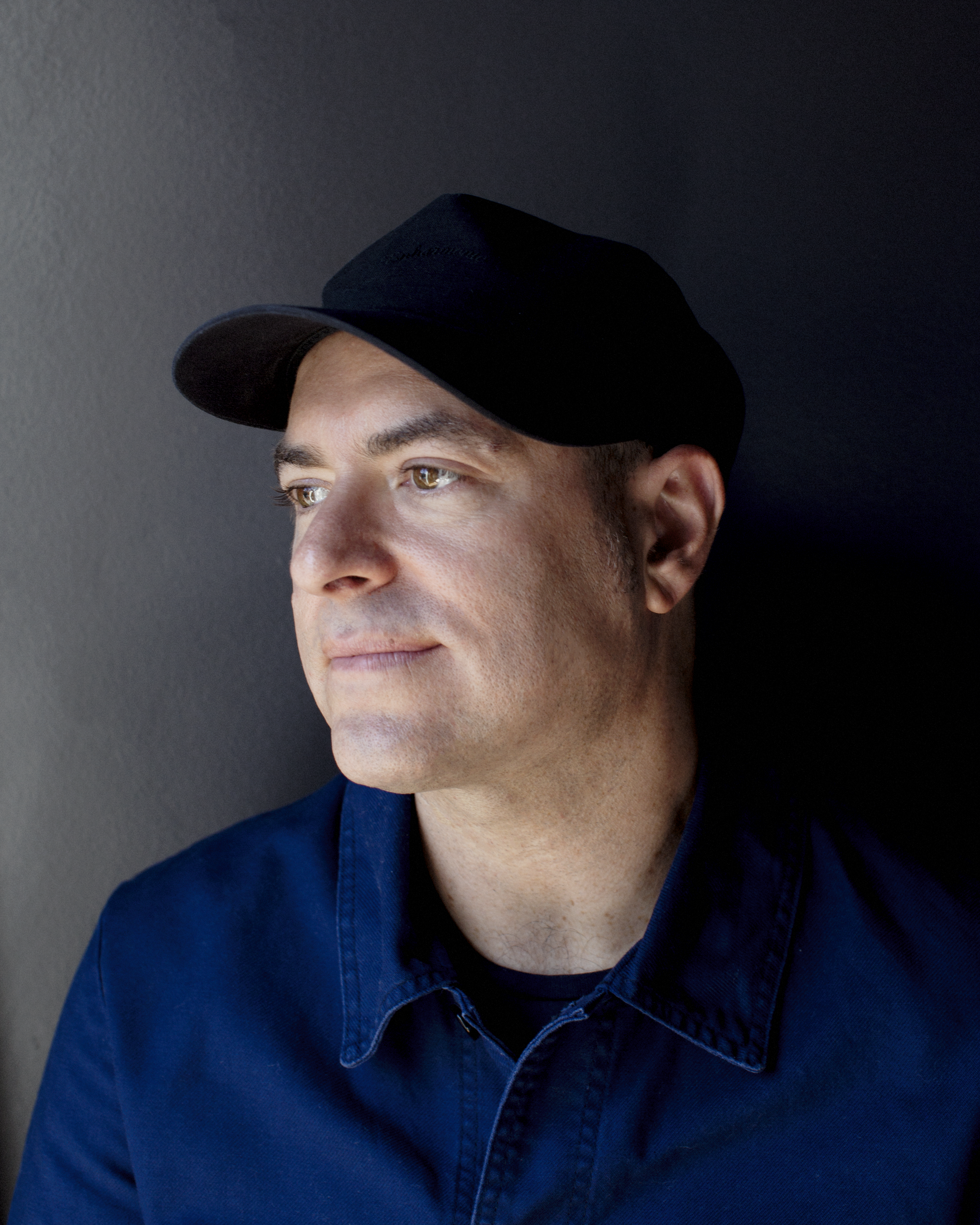
Peter Raeburn was responsible the music used in Paint.

=== Post-production ===
Margaret Brittain from Orchard Grove Housing Association revealed that they allowed Sony to film at their property because it would generate publicity for Toryglen. She told a BBC News reporter that she believed Paint would bring "colour to the estate and create a lot of interest." She revealed that it proved successful because they received worldwide interest about the advert. After filming had finished sixty staff participated in a five day clean-up operation. The advert uses the music from the Overture to "The Thieving Magpie" by Gioachino Rossini. Peter Raeburn from Soundtree Music was responsible for the advert's audio and he synchronised the music to the visuals of paint explosions. Of his work, Raeburn stated "what we're looking for is quite visceral, but the music is quite balletic."

Asylum SFX worked on the advert's post-production. The advert mainly relies on the live action filmed sequences and features minimal special effects. The tanks the paint was stored in prior to detonation were removed from the visuals during post-production. The final advert has a runtime of seventy seconds. It is constructed into two parts, firstly an emotional segment featuring the live action sequences. The final part is informational and features the Sony brand name, slogan and television brand. The tower block of flats were destroyed via a controlled demolition on 21 January 2007. Despite the advert being created to promote Sony's Bravia television, none feature in the advert itself.

== Promotion and broadcast ==
Sony partnered with the PR firm Immediate Future, who worked closely with the digital agency Tonic to build the advert's promotional campaign. Their aim was to generate as much interest in the advert as possible prior to its television debut. The production received a multi-million pound budget from Sony and cost almost two million pounds to produce. To promote the advert, Sony released backstage filming segments to YouTube in the build up to its release. Snippets of information about the advert and photographs were released online to build hype and anticipation for the advert's premiere. An official website for the project was created and visitors given the option of downloading the advert onto their iPod or Sony PSP. Spectators that were allowed to be present during filming helped promote the project with their shared various photographs via the website Flickr, videos posted on YouTube and blog entries published. During the campaign period the website received more than 1.6 million visits, the advert was streamed more than 500, 000 times and downloads of the advert amassed 800, 000. It also became listed as a "mover and shaker" on the web traffic analysis company Alexa Internet and one of the top search results returned on "Google" for the term "advert". It later became the second search result on the platform at the end of 2006. It later became a viral video and OMD Worldwide reported online views of Paint amassing seven million views.

The advertisement was produced for exposure in the United Kingdom. It was premiered online 17 October 2006 and received its television premiere that evening at 8.35pm on the British channel ITV1. It was broadcast in the advertisement break during the Manchester United F.C. v F.C. Copenhagen UEFA Champions League match. Sony continued with the adverts placement occurring in many of television's "sit forward" shows.

In the first six weeks of the advert's launch, Sony's share in the LCD television market was the highest it had been for two years. It was reported in via Financial Times that, five months into the campaign, the Sony Electronics business had begun to recover, citing the success of Paint as a key factor.

== Reception ==
Paint won Campaign magazine's "Campaign of the Year" award in 2006. It won the "Best Commercial" accolade at the 2007 British Television Advertising Awards. The advert also received the 2007 D&AD Wood Pencil award from the British educational organisation Design and Art Direction. In 2009, it ranked ninth on ITV1's Ad of the Decade, five spots higher than Balls.

A BBC News journalist claimed that Paint is "widely regarded as one of the most technically complex adverts ever made." Alexander Smail from Daily Record likened it to adverts from the Skittles confectionery brand Skittles. He added "it is among the most memorable and recognisable campaigns in recent years." He added the clip's highlight is the inclusion of the clown running around. In 2022, the advert was placed at thirty-five on The Drum's "World's best ads ever" feature. Ellen Ormesher wrote that "a rainbow-splattered romp on a housing estate in the south of Glasgow doesn't sound like the most obvious way to sell televisions, but the best ads are rarely literal." It was included at number twenty five in O'Reilly Media's "how 30 great ads were made" feature. It was chosen as Ad Age's "pick of the week" feature and praised the advertising campaign behind the advert. They noted it deserved "points for creating public awareness and excitement online about the making of a commercial." Ad Age's reporter noted the success of the advert "is to say nothing of those few seconds of clown footage, which in themselves made Paint an easy pick o' the week." Claire Beale from The Independent branded Paint a "great ad" that served as an example of a good advertising agency's marketing success.

Mark Connor from Scottish Daily Express branded the "Colour like no other" campaign a "colourful and whacky series of ads." He described Paint as "a spectacular explosion of colour on a scale that had never been seen before." Seth Stevenson from Slate believed that Paint was "fairly astonishing" but "not as breathtaking" as Balls, adding that both provided "simple but powerful sales message". Robin Hicks of Mumbrella included Paint in a list of fifty advertisements "where music made the difference" to the finished product. In the book, "Marketing For Dummies", the advert was praised for being "memorable", helping to convey "a positive perception of the product" and the campaign for "attracting attention to itself." They added that the paint explosions were "reminiscent of the way that the famous fountains shoot up to music at Las Vegas' Bellagio hotel."

Naresh Ramchandani from The Guardian believed that Fallon took a "idealistic gamble" on an expensive production that "paid off handsomely". He branded it "an incredibly striking piece of advertising" that generated much discussion in the advertising industry and public alike. Ramchandani preferred the prior Sony advert Balls and criticised Paint for lacking the "warmth" of its predecessor. He believed the setting in Glasgow where the weather was dull detracted from the overall experience. Ramchandani also bemoaned the large-scale production and worried about the environmental impacts such projects incur. They added that it is "show-off stuff" and criticised the music choice because it clashed with the visuals. The clown confused Ramchandani, who likened it to something seen at both a children's party and a Stephen King novel. He added "it's obscure, self-conscious and ever so slightly disturbing."

Giles Wilson from Ad Breakdown and BBC News reviewed Paint as an "advert you're pleased to watch". He criticised the advert's grandeur noting "a sense of anti-climax" upon learning the amount of effort behind its creation. He acknowledged it as "undoubtedly a marvellous feat of staging and creativity" but in comparison to Balls, it was not the "quite the exuberant equal". He praised the "cunning" advertising campaign behind the advert itself, noting it helped achieve a viral existence online for months prior to Paint's release. Wilson added that this was "really fascinating" hoped their business strategy of advertising the advert would become common practise in the marketing sector. Andy Merrett from Tech Digest was sceptical about the advert's success stating, "it may not have boosted the brand itself, but it was fun to watch."

In 2010, Ohme et al used the three "Colour like no other" adverts in research advertising has on the brain, specifically the effect the averts had on activity in the prefrontal cortex.
