= Bet on Black =

Advertising campaign for Guinness beer

- Agency: Abbott Mead Vickers BBDO, London
- Client: Diageo
- Running time: 90 seconds
- Product: Guinness draught stout
- Release date: 2000
- Directed by: Frank Budgen
- Music by: "Barbarabateri" by Beny More with Pérez Prado and His Orchestra
- Country: United Kingdom
- Preceded by: Surfer
- Followed by: Dreamer

Bet on Black, occasionally referred to as "Snail Race", is an advertising campaign run in 2000 by Diageo to promote Guinness-brand stout in the United Kingdom. The piece, directed by Frank Budgen, follows a snail race taking place in a town of Latin American appearance. It is the third piece of the Good things come to those who wait campaign launched by Abbott Mead Vickers BBDO in 1996, following on from Swimblack (1998) and Surfer (1999). The music in the advertisement is "Barbarabateri" by Beny More with Pérez Prado and his orchestra. Prado's music has also been in used in previous Guinness advertisements such as the successful Anticipation and Swimblack.

Whilst the previous advertisement in the campaign, Surfer, was a success, Bet on Black saw a return to the style of the campaign's inaugural advertisement, Swimblack, featuring a championed sports race and music by Pérez Prado. Conversely, the following advertisement in the campaign, Dreamer, was a return to Surfer's black and white filmography. The four advertisements formed the first part of the campaign which was put on hold for several years afterwards.

Coinciding with the launch of the advertisement was the "Guinness Gastropod Championship", a snail race held in an Irish pub in London in December 1999, this race being recognized as the first competitive live snail race to be held in London.

The advertisement was awarded with the Silver Lion at the annual Cannes Lions International Advertising Festival, and won silver at the British Television Advertising Awards. In November 2009, The Independent named the advertisement, alongside several other advertisements in the campaign, amongst the "greatest advertising of all time".

The 2001 compilation album Off Your Box, which features music from various worldwide advertisements, features a screenshot from the end of the advertisement on its album cover, whilst "Barbarabateri" features on the album.

The advertisement was parodied several years later by Guinness as part of their Summer campaign for their Extra Cold variant.

== Plot ==
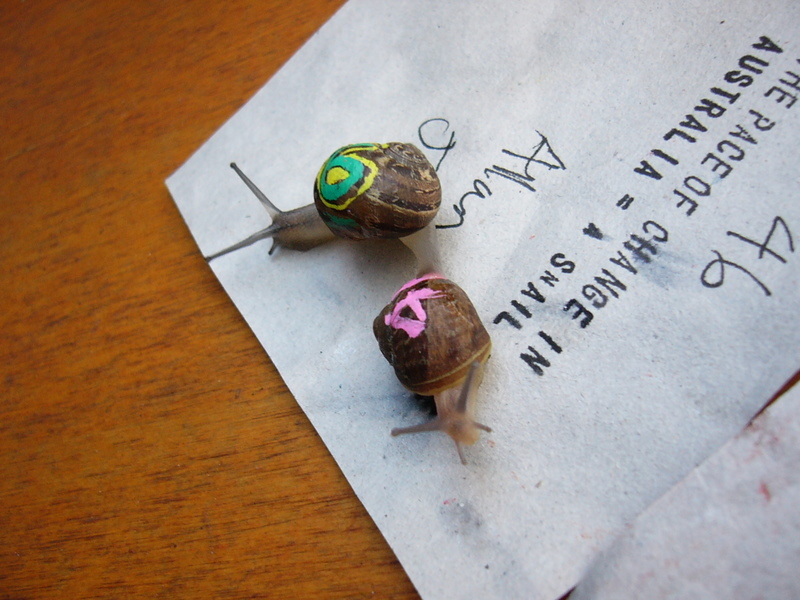
The advertisement follows a comically exaggerated snail race

The sequence opens with shots of various people, as well as some brief shots of transportation. People are then seen setting up a snail race course. The snail race itself brings a large crowd of people, with shots of them betting on various snails in the race. After the snails have been set up, the announcer announces the start of the race and shoots the trigger. The mood changes following this with the music stopping and people looking at disappointment in the snails, who are not moving. After 14 seconds however, the snails begin the race, comically moving very fast (akin to the speed of a slot car) with the music and cheer returning. People follow the race from the building it begins in down various roads. The winner of the race, according to the title of the advert, is Black. After its owner is shown celebrating with others with a pint of Guinness, Black is shown in a used, tipped over Guinness pint glass whilst the slogan appears.

The advertisement was filmed in Cuba, and is said to have first aired on British television in 2000, although it is also believed to have first aired on 2 December 1999.

The advert originally ran for ninety seconds. A shorter, forty second edit of the advert, beginning with the shot being fired to start the race, began to air after a while.

== Parody ==
Serving as advertisements for Guinness' Summer 2004 and 2005 Extra Cold campaign, ten-second parodies of many famous Guinness advertisements were created which turn elements from the original advertisements affected by 'extra cold' environments. One such example, Snail, features a snail from the race, presumably Black, shivering at the start of the race and sneezing, pushing itself back. The tagline at the end reads "Guinness but Extra Cold". Snail was created by two London-based agencies, Exposure Films and Abbott Mead Vickers BBDO.

== Gypsymen single ==
A Todd Terry remix of the song featured in the advert, "Barbarabatiri", saw the song updated into an "Ibiza-friendly anthem", according to UK chart commentator James Masterton, and was released as a single under the pseudonym Gypsymen, charting at number 32 on the UK Singles Chart in August 2001. Although Bet on Black had been on television for some time by this point, the release of the single saw the advert run again with the new Gypsymen version in place of the original.
