= European Film Award for Best Sound Designer =

Annual award given for cinematic achievements in sound design

- Country: Europe
- Presented by: European Film Academy
- First award: 2013
- Currently held by: Yasmina Praderas, Amanda Villavieja, and Laia Casanovas – Sirāt (2025)
- Website: europeanfilmawards.eu

European Film Award for Best Sound Designer has been awarded annually by the European Film Academy. The category was first presented in 2013, though several sound designers were nominated for special awards before.

== Winners and nominees ==
=== 2000s ===
Year	Recipient(s)	English title	Original title
2007 (20th)	Nomination for Award of Excellence		
2007 (20th)	Annette Focks, Jörg Höhne, Robin Pohle, and Andreas Ruft	Four Minutes	Vier Minuten
2008 (21st)	Nomination for Award of Excellence		
2008 (21st)	Petter Fladeby	O' Horten	
2009 (22nd)	Award of Excellence		
2009 (22nd)	Brigitte Taillandier, Francis Wargnier, Jean-Paul Hurier, and Marc Doisne	A Prophet	Un prophète

=== 2010s ===
Year	Recipient(s)	English title	Original title	Ref.
2013 (26th)	Matz Müller and Erik Mischijew	Paradise: Faith	Paradies: Glaube	
2014 (27th)	Joakim Sundström	Starred Up		
2015 (28th)	Vasco Pimentel and Miguel Martins	Arabian Nights	As Mil e uma Noites	
2016 (29th)	Radosław Ochnio	11 Minutes	11 minut	
2017 (30th)	Oriol Tarragó	A Monster Calls		
2018 (31st)	André Bendocchi-Alves and Martin Steyer	The Captain	Der Hauptmann	
2019 (32nd)	Eduardo Esquide, Nacho Royo-Villanova, and Laurent Chassaigne	A Twelve-Year Night	La noche de 12 años	

=== 2020s ===
Year	Recipient(s)	English title	Original title	Ref.
2020 (33rd)	Yolande Decarsin	Little Girl	Petite fille	
2021 (34th)	Gisle Tveito and Gustaf Berger	The Innocents	De uskyldige	
2022 (35th)	Simone Paolo Olivero, Paolo Benvenuti, Benni Atria, Marco Saitta, Ansgar Frerich, and Florian Holzner	Il buco		
2023 (36th)	Johnnie Burn and Tarn Willers	The Zone of Interest		
2024 (37th)	Marc-Olivier Brullé, Pierre Bariaud, Charlotte Butrak, Samuel Aïchoun, and Rodrigo Diaz	Souleymane's Story	L’Histoire de Souleymane	
2025 (38th)	Yasmina Praderas, Amanda Villavieja, and Laia Casanovas	Sirāt		
2025 (38th)	Johnnie Burn	Bugonia		
2025 (38th)	Amal Attia, Elias Boughedir, Lars Ginzel, Gwennolé Le Borgne, and Marion Papinot	The Voice of Hind Rajab	صوت هند رجب	
2026 (39th)	Lars Ginzel and Tarn Willers	Fatherland	Vaterland	
2026 (39th)	Mayte Cazorla, Anna Harrington, Alejandro López, and Rodrigo Madrigal	La bola negra		
2026 (39th)	Robert Farr, Lars Ginzel, and Benjamin Hörbe	NAZA		

== See also ==
- Academy Award for Best Sound
- BAFTA Award for Best Sound
- César Award for Best Sound
