= Johnnie Burn =

British sound engineer (born 1970)

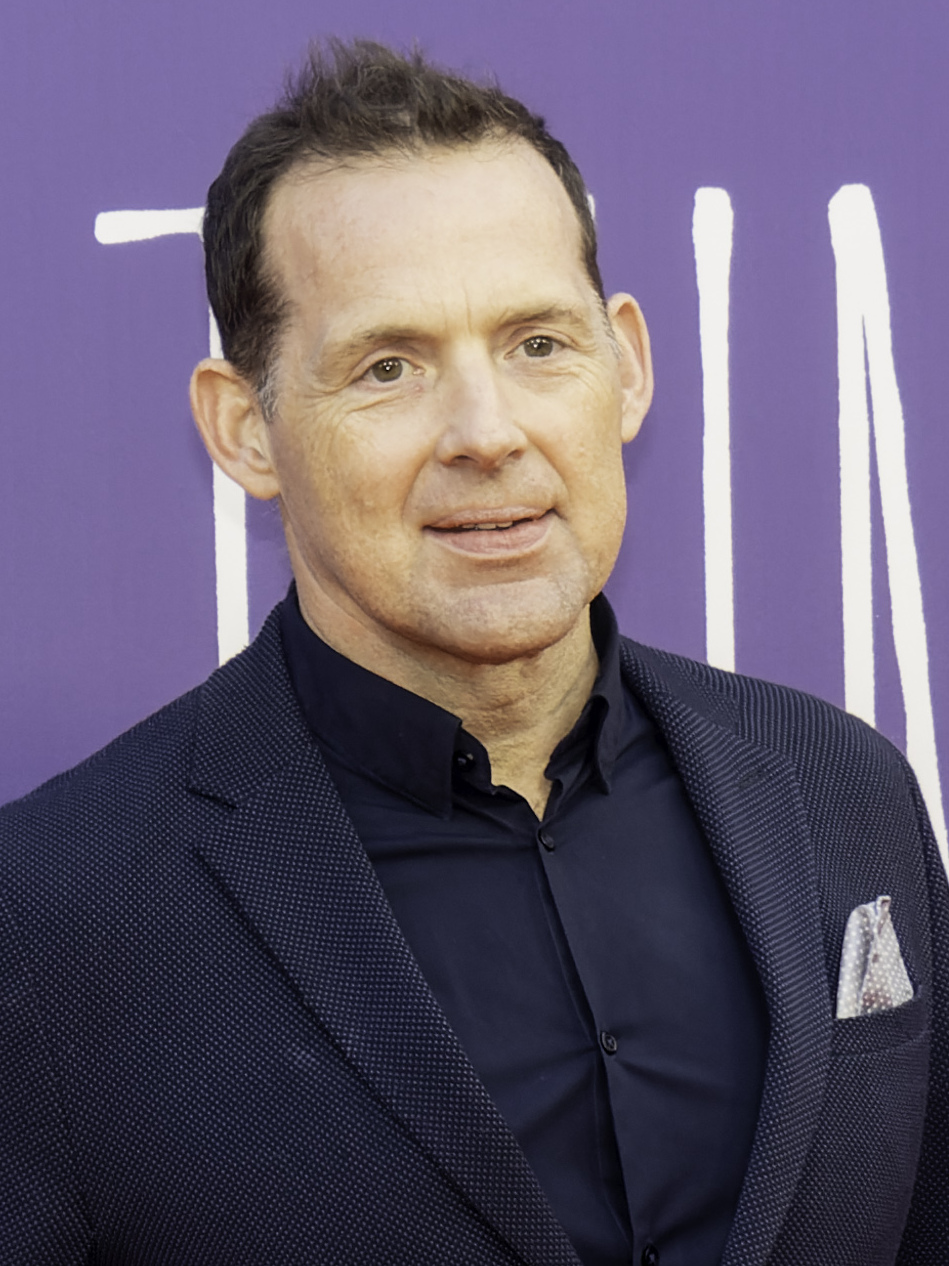
- Burn in 2023
- Born: 1970 (age 55–56)
- Occupation: Sound engineer

Johnnie Burn (born May 1970) is a British film sound designer. In addition to founding Wave Studios, he is known for his collaborations with directors Jonathan Glazer, Jordan Peele, and Yorgos Lanthimos. For his work on the 2023 film The Zone of Interest, Burn won the 2024 Academy Award for Best Sound alongside Tarn Willers.

== Career ==
Burn initially intended to pursue a business career, but dropped out of university to pursue a career in sound design. In 1998, while working at the Tape Gallery in London, he was introduced to frequent collaborator Jonathan Glazer. Burn co-founded Wave Studios in 1999 with Warren Hamilton. In addition to producing sound design for commercials, films, and television, Wave Studios created the sonic branding for the Skype video messaging application.

== Personal life ==
Burn resides in Brighton.

== Filmography ==
=== Film ===
Year	Title	Notes
1992	Weekender	Short film
2004	Birth	—N/a
2012	Payback Season	—N/a
2012	The Devil's Dosh	Short film
2013	Warrioress	—N/a
2013	Under the Skin	—N/a
2015	A Plea for Grimsby	Short film
2015	The Lobster	—N/a
2015	Anchor	Short film
2017	Ghost in the Shell	—N/a
2017	The Killing of a Sacred Deer	—N/a
2018	The Mercy	—N/a
2018	The Favourite	—N/a
2019	Olla	Short film
2019	Nimic	Short film
2019	Waves	—N/a
2020	Ammonite	—N/a
2020	First Light	Short film to promote the Alexander McQueen spring/summer 2021 collection
2022	Nope	—N/a
2023	Poor Things	—N/a
2023	The Zone of Interest	—N/a
2025	28 Years Later	—N/a
2025	Hurry Up Tomorrow	—N/a

=== Television ===
Year	Title	Notes
1992	The Fat Slags	Miniseries
2020	Strasbourg 1518	Television short

=== Commercials ===
Year	Title	Brand
1999	"Surfer"	Guinness
2001	"Dreamer"	Guinness

=== Music videos ===
Year	Title	Artist
1996	"Say You'll Be There"	Spice Girls
1998	"Rabbit in Your Headlights"	Unkle featuring Thom Yorke
1999	"Thursday's Child"	David Bowie
2000	"A Song for the Lovers"	Richard Ashcroft
2000	"Music"	Madonna

== Awards and nominations ==
Year	Award	Category	Nominated work	Result
2013	British Independent Film Awards	Best Technical Achievement	Under the Skin	Nominated
2015	Seattle Film Critics Society	Best Sound Design	Under the Skin	Nominated
2015	International Online Cinema Awards	Best Sound Mixing	Under the Skin	Runner-up (Note: Shared with Steve Single and Nigel Albermaniche)
2015	International Online Cinema Awards	Best Sound Editing	Under the Skin	Runner-up
2015	Ghent International Film Festival	Best Original Music and Sound Design	The Lobster	Won
2018	British Independent Film Awards	Best Sound	The Favourite	Nominated
2019	Golden Reel Awards	Dialogue and ADR for Feature Film	The Favourite	Nominated (Note: Shared with Michelle Fingleton)
2019	Golden Reel Awards	Sound Effects and Foley for Feature Film	The Favourite	Nominated (Note: Shared with Simon Carroll, Caoimhe Doyle, Brendan Rehill, and Jean McGrath)
2020	Golden Reel Awards	Feature Underscore	Waves	Nominated (Note: Shared with Sally Boldt and Trey Edward Shults)
2023	Golden Reel Awards	Sound Effects and Foley for Feature Film	Nope	Nominated (Note: Shared with Simon Carroll, Brendan Feeney, Maximilian Behrens, Ben Gulvin, Jeff Smith Beresford Cookman, Dhyana Carlton-Tims, Natalia Lubowiecka, Ewa Mazurkiewicz, and Jacek Wisniewski)
2023	International Cinephile Society	Best Sound Design	Nope	Nominated (Note: Shared with José Antonio García)
2023	Music + Sound Awards, International	Best Sound Design in a Feature Film	Nope	Won
2023	International Online Cinema Awards	Best Sound	Nope	Won
2023	North Carolina Film Critics Association	Best Sound Design	Nope	Won
2023	Gold Derby Awards	Gold Derby Film Award for Sound	Nope	Nominated
2023	Music City Film Critics Association	Best Sound	Nope	Nominated
2023	Portland Critics Association	Best Sound Design	Nope	Nominated
2023	Minnesota Film Critics Alliance	Best Sound Work	Nope	Runner-up
2023	Hollywood Creative Alliance	Best Sound	Nope	Nominated
2023	Cannes Film Festival	CST Award for Best Artist-Technician	The Zone of Interest	Won
2023	European Film Awards	European Sound	The Zone of Interest	Won (Note: Shared with Tarn Willers)
2023	Los Angeles Film Critics Association	Best Music Score	The Zone of Interest	Won (Note: Shared with Mica Levi)
2023	London Film Critics' Circle	Technical Achievement of the Year	The Zone of Interest	Nominated
2024	Academy Awards	Best Sound	The Zone of Interest	Won
2024	British Academy of Film and Television Arts	Best Sound	The Zone of Interest	Won
2024	International Cinephile Society	Best Sound Design	The Zone of Interest	Pending
2024	Music City Film Critics Association	Best Sound	The Zone of Interest	Nominated
2024	Gold Derby Awards	Gold Derby Film Award for Sound	The Zone of Interest	Nominated
2024	North Dakota Film Society	Best Sound	The Zone of Interest	Nominated
2024	Association of Motion Picture Sound	Excellence in Sound for a Feature Film	The Zone of Interest	Won (Note: Shared with Tarn Willers and Mateusz Stasiak)
2024	Golden Reel Awards	Sound Effects, Foley, Dialogue and ADR for Foreign Language Feature Film	The Zone of Interest	Nominated (Note: Shared with Simon Carroll, Maximilian Behrens, Joe Mount · Brendan Feeney, Ewa Mazurkiewicz, Natalia Lubowiecka, Dawid Konecki and Kamil Kwiatkowski)
2024	Golden Reel Awards	Dialogue and ADR for Feature Film	Poor Things	Nominated (Note: Shared with Tristan Bayliss and Peter Russell)
