= Chain (advertisement) =

1994 British television advertisement

- Agency: Ogilvy & Mather
- Client: Diageo
- Language: English
- Running time: 60 seconds
- Product: Guinness
- Release date: June 1994
- Directed by: Doug Foster
- Music by: Louis Armstrong ("We Have All the Time in the World") (composed by John Barry)
- Starring: Rutger Hauer
- Production company: Blink
- Produced by: Michelle Jaffe
- Country: United Kingdom
- Budget: £150,000+
- Preceded by: Retreat
- Followed by: Anticipation
- Official website: www.itl.net/guinness

Chain is a 1994 British television advertisement for the Irish stout brand Guinness, created by the agency Ogilvy & Mather. It depicts a surreal journey into a pint glass of the beer, which through a blend of live action and computer animation, is achieved by stylising the drink's bubbles as swirling galaxies containing planets. The camera zooms through the stratosphere of a planet through a room within a large tower, finally arriving at a pint of Guinness identical to the opening of the advert. The journey then repeats before bearing the slogan "Pure Genius".

Directed by Doug Foster, Chain was the last of over 20 advertisements in "The Man with the Guinness" campaign that had run since 1987. The campaign's star, actor Rutger Hauer, appears briefly on a flickering black-and-white television within the tower room, alongside items relating to prior Guinness campaigns and iconography. The company Blink oversaw the commercial's production, which utilised computer-controlled cameras and motion control technology.

Premiered in June 1994, Chain was well-received and later won a D&AD Pencil Award. The soundtrack music, Louis Armstrong's 1969 song "We Have All the Time in the World", was re-released as a single and peaked at number three on the UK Singles Chart. Two alternate versions of Chain, featuring heavy guitar music, were run late at night to bookend advert breaks at forwards and backwards speeds. Another edit displayed Guinness' web address, then uncommon practice.

== Synopsis ==
Chain depicts a surreal, swirling journey through a pint glass of Guinness and back out again. Featuring an innovative blend of live action and computer animation, the advertisement opens with a shot of the drink and "zooms in on the bubbles in the glass," each of which forms a galaxy in which a planet emerges. The camera zooms into the stratosphere of one of the planets, travelling through a desert boasting a large conic tower, and continues to travel into a room within the tower. Finally, the camera arrives at a pint of Guinness standing on a table inside the room, identical to the opening shot, and the trip is repeated again. The slogan at the end of the advertisement is "Pure Genius".

== Production ==
=== Background ===
In the 1980s, Ogilvy & Mather were hired to take over the British Guinness marketing account from J Walter Thompson, introducing the slogan "Pure Genius" for the drink in August 1985. Continuing to use the slogan, Ogilvy launched "The Man with the Guinness" campaign in May 1987, which was centred around a series of surreal television advertisements starring Blade Runner star Rutger Hauer, who would deliver similarly surreal monologues. Between 1987 and 1991, the campaign had helped draught Guinness steadily increase in sales, and revitalised the beer's sales overall. As the campaign continued, major directors such as Hugh Hudson, Ridley Scott and Paul Weiland were hired as the advertisements became increasingly more obscure, moving away from the "talking head" format to what journalist Jim Davies describes as "a more ambitious journey into the mysterious of Guinness with the Hauer character as an interpreter."

Davies opines that, as the later commercials became more extravagant, including Retreat (1993), the campaign "finally ran out of steam", while Ogily & Mather deputy Chairman Tom Bury noted that: "The campaign had reached a plateau. Some [adverts] did better than others, but the overall feeling was that it was getting a bit old and tired." Additionally, by the early 1990s, the format of using an eccentric spokesperson had been adopted for rival beer brand for their own advertising, including Holsten Pils. 1994's Chain was conceived as the final advertisement in "The Man with the Guinness" campaign, and consequently the final of more than 20 Guinness commercials to star Hauer. Contextualising Chain and other later adverts in "The Man with the Guinness" campaign, Davies said: "Special effects and dazzling sets were increasingly employed to cover up the cracks that were beginning to appear in the underlying idea."

Created for Guinness by the London-based Ogilvy UK, Chain was directed by Doug Foster and produced by Michelle Jaffe. Blink were hired as the production company, while art director Brian Fraser and copywriter Simon Learman both also acted as creative directors, while Tim Burke was hired as editor. Before joining Ogilvy & Mather, Fraser and Learman were classmates at the St Martin's School of Art; their work on Chain is considered to be among their most notable work for Ogilvy, before their move to Boase Massimi Pollitt. Previously a special effects expert, Foster was the first director signed to Blink following their reinvention from a small animations shop to a studio for live-action advertisements. Chain was created within a year of his appointment.

=== Filming and animation ===
Chain took more than six months to create, with a post-production budget nearly totalling £150,000. According to Campaign Live's Margaret Hood, in the completed advert, "not even hardened industry veterans can spot the joins", partly because "the camera movement was planned in computer graphics and designed as computer animation before the model elements were shot for the film." The three computer animators on the project were Grahame Andrew, later of the Mill; Paul Kavanagh, later to join Framestore; and Ben Hayden, soon recruited by Industrial Light & Magic in the United States. Asheton Gorton created the set designs for the commercial.

Chain was created with motion control technology and computer-controlled cameras. According to Andrew, although the technology was once unpopular for being slow to operate, they had developed significantly with capabilities many were unaware of, adding: "In computer graphics, you have the ability to control an imaginary camera, and in motion control, it's a real camera." The advertisement was shot using a Cyclops motion-control machine, which, according to Hood, uses "a camera capable of speeds of up to 11 feet per second." The crew then utilised a motion-control rig where they maintained the correct scale of the models and a continuous camera speed, the latter employing a "slow determination" throughout that Andrew considers crucial to the final advertisement's popularity.

There are two switches that separate the advertisement's live footage and animation. Firstly, the segue between the genuine Guinness bubbles to the computer-animated galaxies, and secondly the segue from the upper half of the tower – a physical model – to the computer-animated lower half. The bubbles were filmed inside a flat-sided tank and were repeatedly shot until the team had captured a formation resembling "the 'swirl' of a galaxy". According to Hood, these bubbles "were then duplicated using computer animation, the computer-generated galaxy was tracked over the top of the real bubbles, and the two were mixed together to form the finished sequence."

Inside the room in the tower, realised as a life-size set, the lens was placed at a distance and then moved with motion-control (in a manner already designed on software) to the final position as the camera continued filming, thus allowing the sequence to be continued in post-production. Utilising an identical technique, the tip of the 15-foot high model tower was filmed next. The movement had been designed so that "the life-sized room would fit into the smaller room in the model of the tower." Although the space sequences were all computed-animated, brand new footage was filmed for effects, with swirls on the planets created with "mixtures of Guinness, full cream and washing-up liquid, which gave very interesting slow-moving textures that looked like planetary atmosphere." Hood opined that this technique of "mixing 'live' footage in an animation programme" resulted in a commercial that diverted drastically from "conventional computer animation."

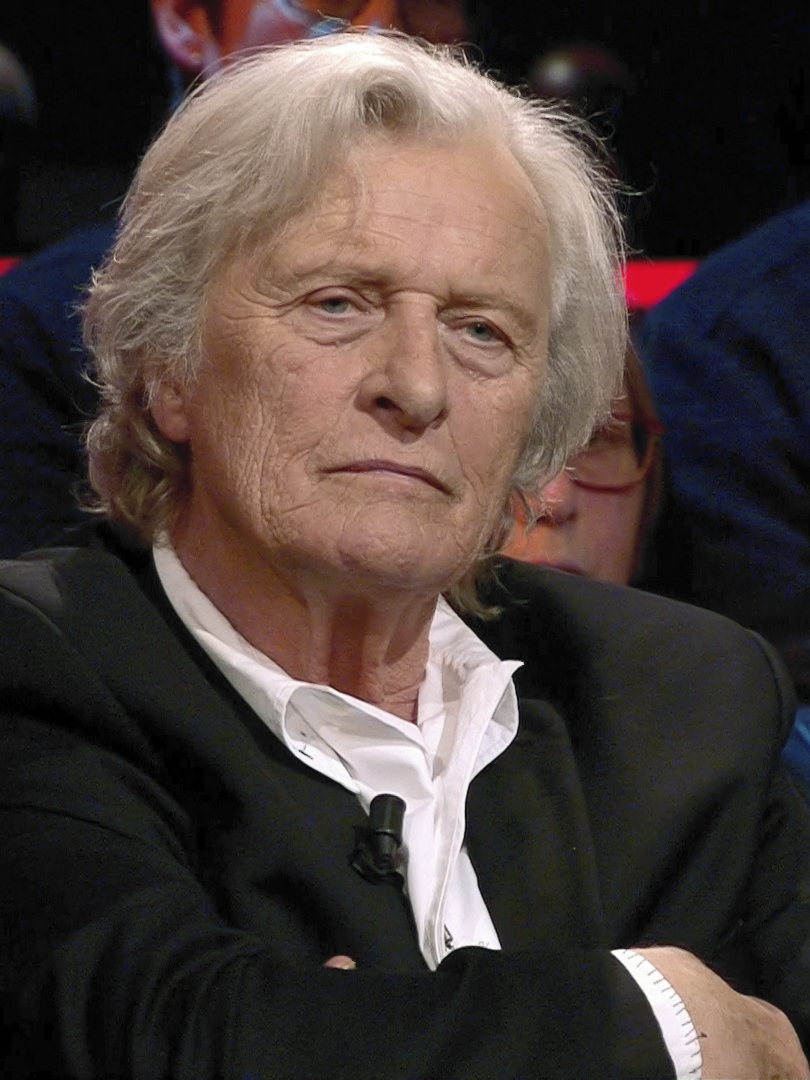
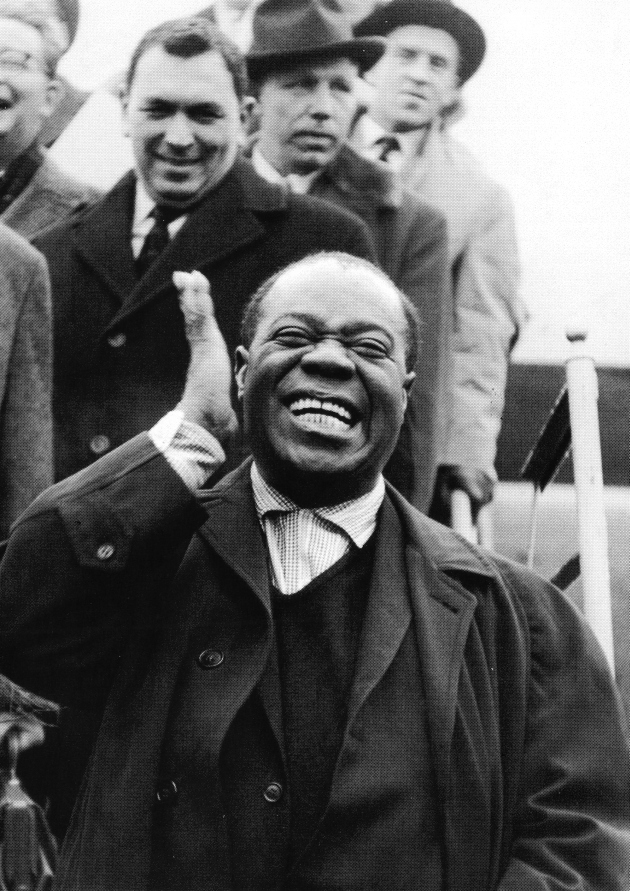
Chain features a cameo appearance from Rutger Hauer (left, 2018) and music from Louis Armstrong (right, 1962)

Making his final appearance in a Guinness advertisement, Hauer is briefly glimpsed as a flickering image on a black-and-white television screen in the central room. TV Weekly's Sue Malins commented that Hauer appears "in what might be described as a supporting role" in the "surreal" advertisement. The actor's contract ended on 31 December 1994, preventing further airings of his Guinness adverts from that point. The room set in Chain also contains several visual references to earlier Guinness iconography and advertisements, including the presence of a harp, teddy bear, diver's helmet and picture frames. A pint of Guinness is placed in the centre of the room, beside a book on the chaos theory.

=== Music ===
The central version of the advertisement is soundtracked by Louis Armstrong's relaxing "We Have All the Time in the World" (1969), although a separate version soundtracked by a frenetic rock song from the British band Slaughterhouse was also aired. According to Hood, Blink found that the visuals "[worked] with almost any music, from Vivaldi's Four Seasons to thrash metal." Carl Mesner Lyons, part of Guinness' brand team for "The Man with the Guinness" campaign, comments that Nigel Kennedy's recording of The Four Seasons was the team's original choice, but that Armstrong's song – originally taken from the soundtrack of On Her Majesty's Secret Service (1969) – was "thankfully" chosen ahead of it.

== Broadcast ==
Chain premiered on British television in June 1994. A spokesperson for Guinness commented on the offbeat theme of the advertisement, saying that "this sort of ad continues to be extremely popular", adding: "It is important for us to stay at the leading edge of advertising to keep our brand at the forefront of consumers' minds." The version with Armstrong's music was the official version, whereas the "alternate, thrashy guitar" version was used to bookend commercial breaks on late night TV, with a 30-second version playing forwards at the beginning of the break, and a reversed 30-second version at the end. This, according to Lyons, "was an attempt to surprise and appeal to [youth] drinkers." This "guitar edit" was also incorporated into a "live Guinness experience" – featuring a 3D motion simulator, similar in practice to a flight simulator, that allowed participants to feel as though they were "in the ad" themselves – which toured college and university campuses.

By the end of 1994, Rutger's contract had ended, but a follow-up campaign had yet to be decided on, and although Guinness required another television advert, they had none to run. Lyons comments that the solution was "to edit Rutger's face out of the portable TV in Chain and replace it with a pint", and run this version into 1995. Another version, featuring the URL of Guinness' website in the final frame, was also run. This version has been credited as one of the earliest British advertisements to display a web address.

== Reception ==
Chain was widely acclaimed, and won a "Yellow Pencil" at the D&AD Pencil Awards 1995. In a 1996 interview, Andrew described Chain as one of three pieces of which he is most proud, alongside a 'bouncing' BBC2 ident and a commercial for Muller Light. Hood described all three as "computer-graphics achievements that some would die for." The co-founder of the agency Truant London, Simon Labbett, considers Chain superior to Surfer (1999) and names it as the commercial that inspired him to work in the advertising industry, adding that its "genius" laid not in its "storytelling, sublime soundtrack or incredible visuals" but "the strange assortment of letters that appeared in the final frame. Something we now recognise, 30 years later, as a URL." While believing that the URL appeared as a mere series of cryptic characters to many, it sparked his own interest in digital advertising, later joining Ogilvy and launching Guinness' "first-ever brand experience website", Guinness Local Live.

On 14 November 1994, following requests from viewers who enjoyed hearing it on the commercial, Louis Armstrong's "We Have All the Time in the World" was re-released as a single by EMI, having already been made available on the label's James Bond 30th Anniversary Album. It peaked at number three on the UK Singles Chart on 20 November, a position it spent two weeks at, and totalled 19 weeks inside the Top 100. By 30 November, it had sold 100,000 copies. The release was a contender in the race for the Christmas number one 1994, with many making bets at Ladbrokes on Armstrong topping the chart. On the Christmas chart, the song reached number 10. The single also reached number four in the Southport Visiter charts; the newspaper stated: "The world of advertising has handed Louis Armstrong his first chart hit for longer than anyone can remember." Asked if he was concerned that the song became a hit in Britain through its use in the advert, the song's composer, John Barry, said: "Absolutely not. I think Guinness is a hell of a drink! It's ironic in a way that somebody's selling ale and you get a hit out of it. But that's the way of the world."

== See also ==
- Guinness advertising
- 1994 in British television
- Droste effect
- Surrealist film
- Tower of Babel
