= Sony marketing =

Variety of marketing techniques used by the Sony Corporation

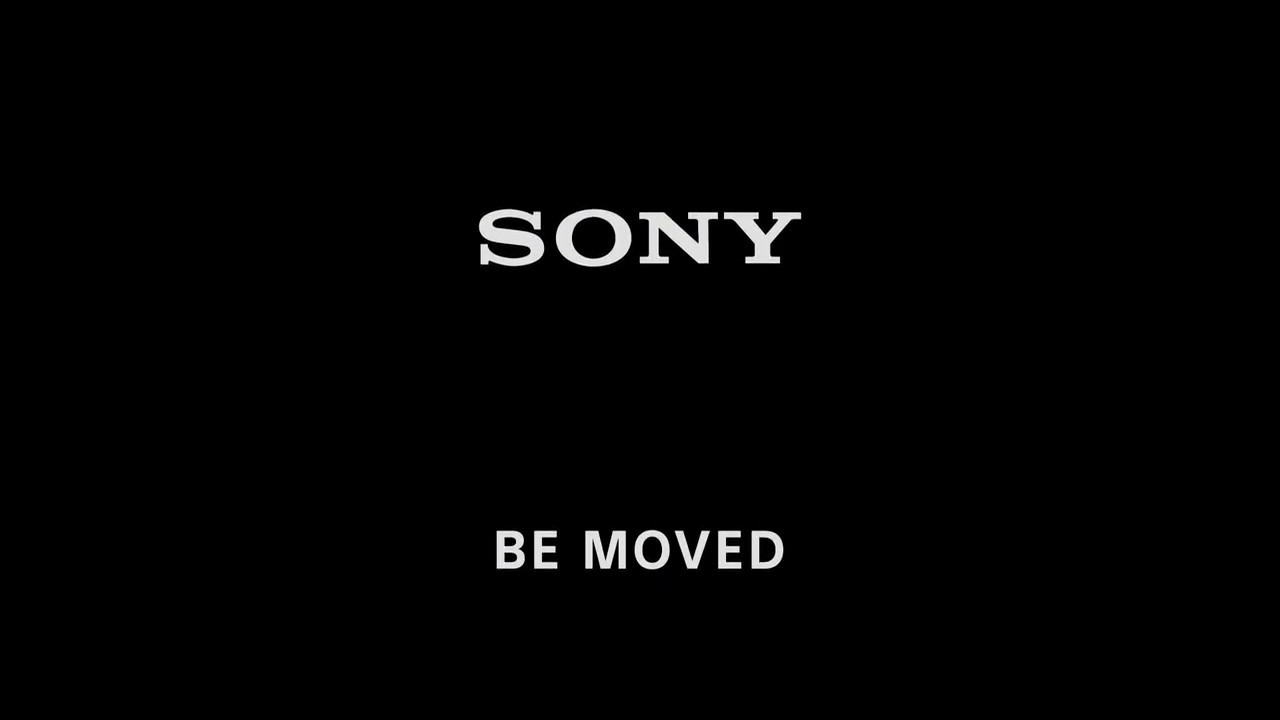

The Japanese technology company, Sony, engaged in a variety of different marketing efforts, as one of the world's largest and most pervasive corporations.

== General campaigns ==
Sony first contracted Atchan, a cartoon character created by Fuyuhiko Okabe, to become its advertising character. Now known as "Sony Boy", the character had since appeared in a cartoon advertisement holding a TR-6 to his ear but went on to represent the company in ads for a variety of products well into the mid-sixties.

=== make.believe ===
In 2009 Sony announced a brand strategy which would replace the "like.no.other" moniker. The words "make.believe" form the "Sony Group Brand Message". The words are designed to unify the company's efforts at communication, and to reinvigorate the Sony brand. This marks the first time any message has served to represent the company's entire range of products. Previously, the company adopted separate strategies in its promotion of entertainment and electronics products.

Sony budgeted US$100 million for its "make.believe" campaign in 2010. That same year, Sony rolled out the second portion of the campaign, focused on promoting its 3D offerings. It broadcast television advertisements featuring American football player Peyton Manning as well as pop singer Justin Timberlake. The ads were intended to teach consumers about 3D and reduce misconceptions about the technology. As part of the push, the company planned to conduct several thousand demonstrations in retail settings, allowing consumers to see 3D technology first-hand.

== Product-line specific campaigns ==
=== Paint ===
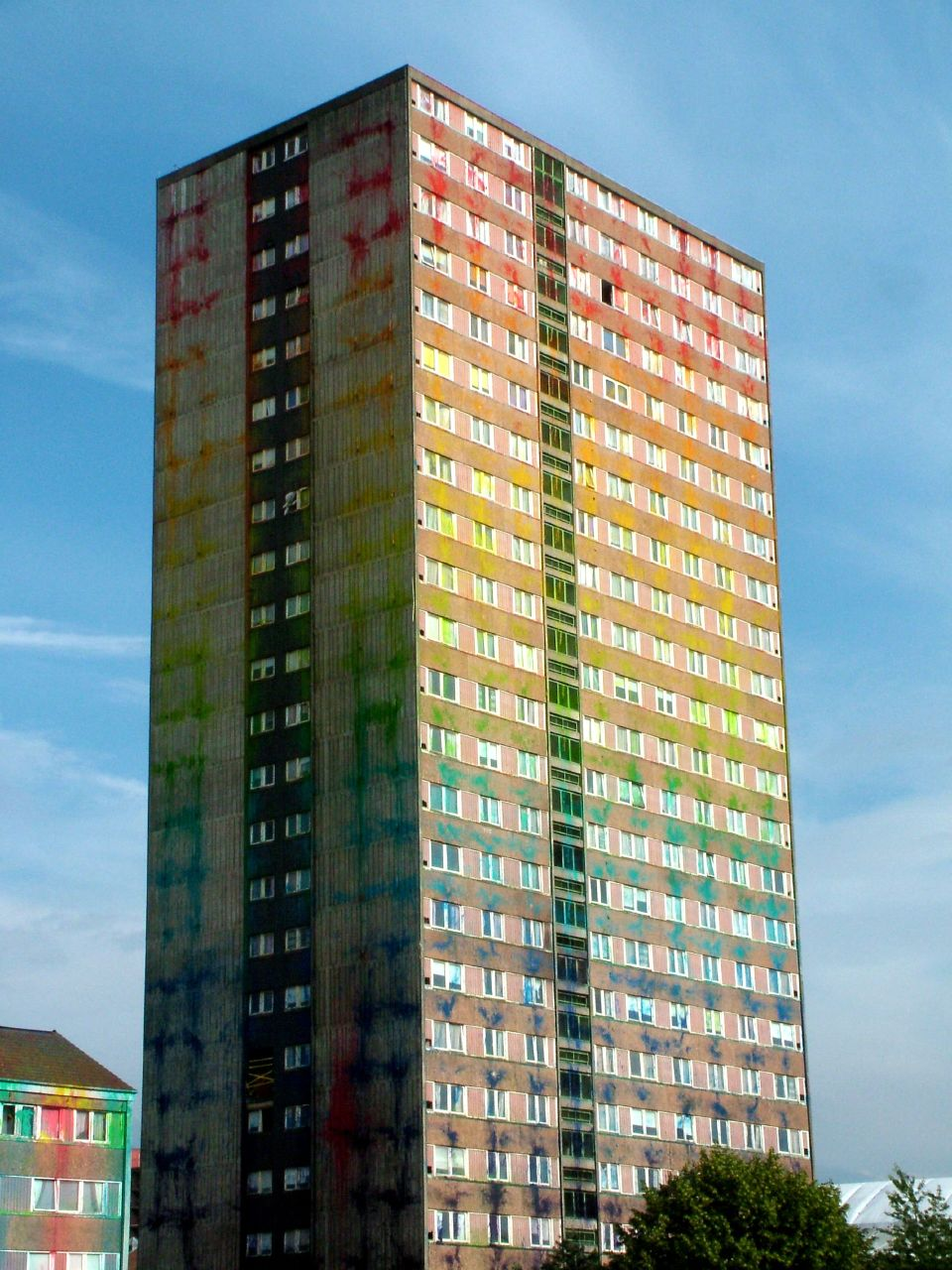
Glasgow tower block, the day after filming

Following on from the original advert, Jonathan Glazer directed the second advertisement in which a condemned tower block in Toryglen in Glasgow, Scotland was covered in 70,000 litres of environmentally friendly paint with the help of over 1,400 separate explosions featured as imitation fireworks, concluding with a simulated "reverse demolition" of the building. This was filmed with a crew of 200 people over a 10-day period in July 2006. The music used in this commercial is the Overture to The Thieving Magpie by Gioachino Rossini. The tower block was demolished in 2007.

=== Play-Doh ===
The Play-Doh advertisement was filmed in a street in New York City where 200 rabbits made from 2.5 Tonnes of plasticine united to form a 30-foot giant rabbit. The accompanying soundtrack is "She's a Rainbow" by The Rolling Stones. The commercial was filmed in New York City.

=== Pyramid ===
An advert was filmed in Egypt. It featured thousands of colored cotton reels tumbling down a pyramid. The cotton reels were not actually rolled down the pyramid but was rather a composition of real footage and CGI.

=== Dominoes ===
Launched in October 2008 and shot on location in India's states of Rajasthan and Uttar Pradesh. The music for the spot was created by Song Zu and Darker My Love's Rob Barbato.

=== BRAVIA-drome ===
The BRAVIA-drome at Venaria, in Northern Italy

In December 2008, Sony filmed a large zoetrope called the BRAVIA-drome in Venaria, Italy to advertise Motionflow 240 Hz in the Sony BRAVIA KDL-52XBR7.

Motionflow 200 Hz/240 Hz is Sony's motion interpolation technology, where three new frames are added per original frame of footage to smooth the picture. Sixty-four Da Pro footballer Kaká were used inside the BRAVIA-drome to demonstrate that with increased frame rate (speed at which the zoetrope rotated), there is increased smoothness of motion. Measuring 10 metres in diameter and weighing 10 tonnes, the BRAVIA-drome has officially been declared the world's largest zoetrope by Guinness World Records.

The advert was directed by Vernie Yeung, produced by Fallon Worldwide, the agency behind the "Balls", "Paint" and "Play-doh" trilogy, and is currently airing in Australia. The music used in this commercial is "Underdog", by Kasabian.

=== Kevin Butler ===
Kevin Butler (portrayed by actor Jerry Lambert) is a marketing character used by Sony Computer Entertainment America as part of their It Only Does Everything (2009–2011) and Long Live Play (2011–present) advertising campaigns for the PlayStation 3 in North America.

The string of commercials starring Kevin Butler has been met with positive acclaim due to its humorous and lively tone. Gaming site Kotaku commented on the first two commercials that were released, "What we didn't mention is how funny they are." Sony Computer Entertainment America Senior Vice President Peter Dille said that the commercials have "been tremendously successful. Consumers love it. It's great to hear people like you guys love it. And the results are really in the sales because it's really been flying since this coincided in September with the launch of the new PS3." Engadget also loved the commercials saying, "We have to hand it to Sony, they've followed up nicely on their "worst kept secret" trade show jokes with an ad campaign that is fittingly self-aware". Destructoid praised the commercials, saying that they were much better than Sony's previous White Room series of ads, which was met with mostly negative reception, with most calling it "creepy." When Butler appeared at E3 2010, he was met with large praise from the audience.

=== Walkman ===
Sony's marketing team produced their first Walkman advertisement, a print ad, in 1979 named Bridging the difference. The marketing of the Walkman introduced the idea of 'Japanese-ness' into global culture, synonymous with miniaturization and high-technology. While it was launched as Walkman in Asia, the Middle East and Latin America, it was rebranded as Freestyle in Sweden, since the Sony staff in Sweden objected to the illicit connotations of the word "stowaway". The use of these different names meant that the same product had to be promoted with different logos and package designs. Before the release of the Walkman, Sony distributed 100 cassette-players to influential individuals like magazine editors and musicians.

The "Walk-men" and "Walk-women" in advertisements were created to be the ideal reflections of the subject watching. This supposed link that the consumer can have with the product allows one to identify with the personalized device, which then can become an integrated part of his or her life. The advertising of the Sony Walkman served to portray it as a culturally "hip" item. The advertisements contained youthful and fit people using the Walkman in order to entice people into purchasing it. The people in the commercials embodied the "identities we can become", thus making the Walkman a more appealing product for consumers. Teenagers were targeted by the advertising in particular, as Sony's executives hoped that by marketing their product to teens, the Walkman brand would become associated with "youth, activity, sport, leisure, the outdoors, fitness, health, movement, [and] getting-out-and-about". The word "walk-man" itself had provided consumers with a vision of the product. In addition to these other modes of advertising, the Walkman can be marketed through its idea of being a definition of today's culture. "It belongs to our culture because we have constructed for it a little world of meaning; and this bringing of the object into meaning is what constitutes it as a cultural artefact".

A main component of Walkman advertising campaign was personalization of the device. Having the ability to customize a playlist was an important invention in the history of music players. Potential buyers had the opportunity to choose their perfect match in terms of mobile listening technology. This method of marketing to an extremely expansive user-base while maintaining the idea that the product was made for each individual "[got] the best of all possible worlds—mass marketing and personal differentiation".

In the early 2000s, Sony debuted Plato, a blue alien, as its mascot for the Walkman.

==== Xperia Z series (2013–2015) ====
In 2015, Sony offered Daniel Craig $5 million to use the Xperia Z4 (known as the Xperia Z3+ globally) in the James Bond movie, Spectre but he turned it down because for him, Sony phones "aren't cool enough" for James Bond and he didn't want to tarnish the character's reputation of only wanting the best. Craig eventually accepted it but at the time the film was released, the Xperia Z4's successor, the Xperia Z5, was already out so the latter became the official smartphone of James Bond in the film instead.

== Controversies ==
Sony admitted in late 2005 to hiring graffiti artists to spray paint advertisements for their PlayStation Portable game system in seven major cities including New York City, Philadelphia, San Francisco, and Sydney, Australia. The mayor of Philadelphia filed a cease and desist order. According to Sony, they paid businesses and building owners for the right to graffiti their walls. Sony made no plans to keep or withdraw the ads.

In November 2006, a marketing company employed by Sony created a website entitled "All I want for Xmas is a PSP", designed to promote the PSP through viral marketing. The site contained a blog, which was purportedly written by "Charlie", a teenager attempting to get his friend "Jeremy"'s parents to buy him a PSP, providing links to T-shirt iron-ons, Christmas cards, and a "music video" of either Charlie or Jeremy "rapping". However, visitors to the website soon discovered that the website was registered to a marketing company, exposing the site on sites such as YouTube and digg, and Sony was forced to admit the site's true origin in a post on the blog, stating that they would from then on "stick to making cool products" and that they would use the website for "the facts on the PSP". The site has since been taken down. In an interview with next-gen.biz, Sony admitted that the idea was "poorly executed".
