= Tarn Willers =

British sound engineer

- Born: England
- Education: Thomas Rotherham College
- Occupation: Sound engineer

Tarn Anthony Willers (born September 1972) is a British sound engineer. He won an Academy Award in the category Best Sound for the film The Zone of Interest.

At the 77th British Academy Film Awards, he won a BAFTA Award for Best Sound. His win was shared with Johnnie Burn.

== Life ==
Willers was born in England in 1972 and attended Thomas Rotherham College in his youth. He graduated from the National Film and Television School in 2004.

Willers resides in Poland.

== Selected filmography ==
=== Film ===
Year	Title	Notes
2011	The Veteran	—N/a
2011	The British Guide to Showing Off	Credited as Tarn Willars
2011	Land Gold Women	—N/a
2012	Comes a Bright Day	—N/a
2012	Piggy	—N/a
2012	Wasteland	—N/a
2013	The Comedy Store: Raw & Uncut	—N/a
2013	Dr. Easy	Short film
2013	Emily	Short film
2013	Fish Love	Short film
2014	Scintilla	—N/a
2014	The Dark	Short film
2014	Fury	—N/a
2015	The Fly	Short film
2015	If It Looks Like Love	Short film
2015	Gilt	Short film
2016	Scarlet	Short film
2016	The Take	—N/a
2016	Kaleidoscope	—N/a
2016	Don't Hang Up	—N/a
2017	Double Date	—N/a
2019	Zero	Short film
2019	Days of the Bagnold Summer	—N/a
2021	The Power	—N/a
2021	Brigitte Bardot cudowna	—N/a
2023	Temptation	—N/a
2023	The Zone of Interest	—N/a
2023	O psie, który jezdzil koleja	—N/a
2023	Starve Acre	—N/a

=== Television ===
Year	Title	Notes
2009 – 2015	Holby City	33 episodes
2015	Undercover	5 episodes
2015	Bull	1 episode
2016	New Blood	7 episodes
2017	W1A	2 episodes
2018	Kiss Me First	2 episodes
2021 – 2022	Hotel Europa	2 episodes

== Awards and nominations ==
Year	Award	Category	Nominated work	Result
2023	European Film Awards	Best Sound Designer	The Zone of Interest	Won (Note: Shared with Johnnie Burn)
2024	Minnesota Film Critics Alliance	Best Sound	The Zone of Interest	Nominated
2024	North Dakota Film Society	Best Sound	The Zone of Interest	Nominated
2024	Music City Film Critics Association	Best Sound	The Zone of Interest	Nominated
2024	Association of Motion Picture Sound	Excellence in Sound for a Feature Film	The Zone of Interest	Won (Note: Shared with Johnnie Burn and Mateusz Stasiak)
2024	Gold Derby Awards	Gold Derby Film Award for Sound	The Zone of Interest	Nominated
2024	International Cinephile Society	Best Sound Design	The Zone of Interest	Nominated
2024	British Academy of Film and Television Arts	Best Sound	The Zone of Interest	Won
2024	Academy Awards	Best Sound	The Zone of Interest	Won
