= Snail racing =

Form of humorous entertainment

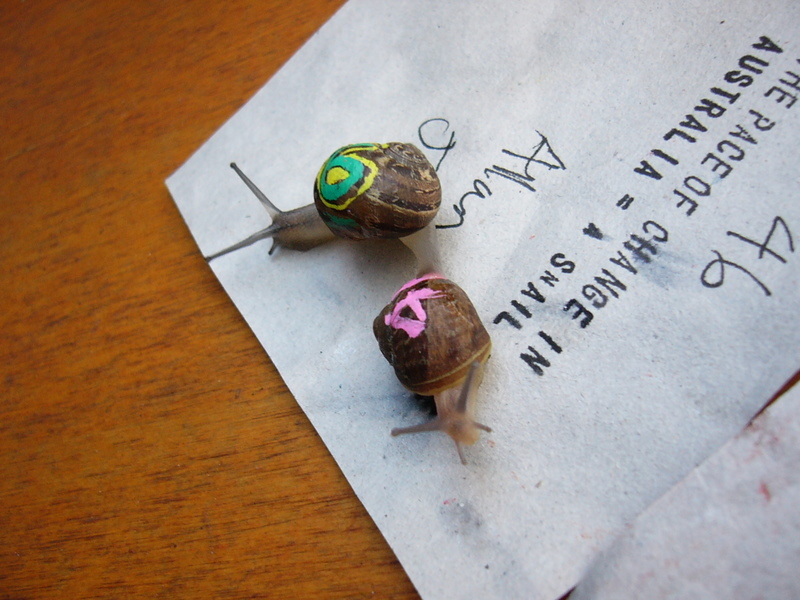
Two racing snails with their shells labeled

Snail racing is a form of humorous entertainment that involves the racing of two or more air-breathing land snails. Usually the garden snail (Cornu aspersum) is used. This species is native to Europe, but has been accidentally introduced to many countries all over the world.

There are numerous snail racing events in different places around the world, though the majority take place in the United Kingdom. Snail races usually take place on a circular track with the snails starting in the middle and racing to the perimeter. The track usually takes the form of a damp cloth on top of a table. The radius is traditionally set at 13 or 14 inches (33 to 36 cm). Racing numbers are painted on the shells or small stickers or tags are placed on them to distinguish each competitor.

== Competitions ==
It's always difficult to study the form with snails because they hide inside their shells - but it's actually much easier to commentate on the race because it's slower than horse racing.

— John McCririck

=== World Snail Racing Championships ===
The annual "World Snail Racing Championships" started in Congham, Norfolk, United Kingdom in the 1960s after founder Tom Elwes witnessed a snail racing event in France. They are usually held in July. The 1995 race saw the setting of the benchmark time of 2 minutes over the 13-inch (33 cm) course by a snail named Archie (speed of 0.006 mph). The 2007 event had to be cancelled when the course was waterlogged by a prolonged period of heavy rain, only days after the death of Elwes. The 2008 World Championships were won by Heikki Kovalainen, a snail named after the Formula One racing driver, in a time of 3 minutes and 2 seconds.

Winners of World Snail Racing Championships
Year	Series	Champion	Snail name	Race time
1995	26th	Carl Bramham	Archie	2 mins 0 secs
1996	27th			
1997	28th			
1998	29th	Thomas Vincent (1)	Schumacher	
1999	30th			
2000	31st	Thomas Vincent (2)	Eddie Irvine	4 mins 4 secs
2001	32nd			
2002	33rd	Brendan Hird		
2003	34th			
2004	35th			
2005	36th	Liam Ellis	Thierry	
2006	37th	Emma Hartley	Archie	2 mins 20 secs
2007	Cancelled (waterlogged course)			
2008	38th	Georgie Brown	Heikki	3 mins 2 secs
2009	39th	Claire Hopkins	Terri	2 mins 49 secs
2010	40th	Claire Lawrence	Sidney	3 mins 41 secs
2011	41st	Anton Lucas	Zoomer	3 mins 23 secs
2012	42nd	Sue Ryder (1)	Racer	3 mins 20 secs
2013	43rd	Sue Ryder (2)	Racer II	2 mins 47 secs
2014	44th	Zeben Butler-Alldred	Wells	3 mins 19 secs
2015	45th	Dale Thorne	George	2 mins 45 secs
2016	46th	Colin Voss	Herbie 2	3 mins 25 secs
2017	47th	Tara Beasley	Larry	2 mins 47 secs
2018	48th	Jo Waterfield	Hosta	3 mins 10 secs
2019	49th	Maria Welby	Sammy	2 mins 38 secs
2020	Cancelled (COVID-19 pandemic)			
2021	Cancelled (COVID-19 pandemic)			
2022	Cancelled (COVID-19 pandemic)			
2023	50th	Lettie Spragg	Evie	7 mins 24 secs
2024	51st	Simon Lilley	Jeff	4 mins 5 secs
2025	52nd	Shell Rowe	Bilbo Sluggins	2 mins 11 secs

Multiple Winners
Champion	Wins	Years
Sue Ryder	2	2012, 2013
Thomas Vincent	2	1998, 2000

=== Guinness Gastropod Championship ===
The first official competitive live snail race in London, the "Guinness Gastropod Championship" held in 1999, was commentated by horse racing pundit John McCririck who started the race with the words "Ready, Steady, Slow". This became common terminology for the start of a race. The following year Guinness featured a snail race in their advertisement Bet on Black as part of their "Good things come to those who wait" campaign. The advert won the silver award at the Cannes Lions International Advertising Festival and was self-parodied for their "Extra Cold" campaign several years later.

=== Grand Championship Snail Race ===
The "Grand Championship Snail Race" began in 1992 in the village of Snailwell, Cambridgeshire, England as part of its annual summer fête. It regularly attracts up to 400 people to the village, more than doubling its usual population.
