= Joe McKinney =

Irish actor (born 1967)

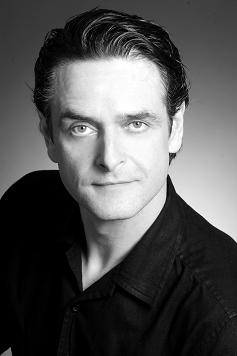
- Born: Joseph Anthony McKinney; 12 May 1967 (age 59); Rathfarnham, Dublin, Ireland
- Occupation: Actor

Joseph Anthony McKinney (born 12 May 1967) is an Irish actor. Rathfarnham-born McKinney trained and worked as a hairdresser for four years, before joining fringe theatre. He trained at Inchicore VEC Dublin and worked on stage productions such as the Irish Premiere of Unidentified Human Remains and the True Nature of Love by Brad Fraser and Saved by Edward Bond, both directed by Jimmy Fay, for Bedrock Productions in 1994. Other theatre productions include Joe Dowlings production of Brendan Behan's Borstal Boy (McKinney's first paid role), and Bouncers by John Godber, both 1995. Recent theatre includes Attic Improv's Spoonfed, Dublin Fringe 2005 and An Image for The Rose, which was nominated for Sexiest Fringe Show 2006.

In 1994, after featuring in a couple of commercials, McKinney starred in the Guinness advert, Anticipation, in which he danced around a pint while waiting for it to settle. Following the success of the commercial, he spent two years touring Europe making personal appearances to promote the product.

In 1997, McKinney moved to New York to pursue artistic representation and auditions. Moving back to Ireland, he also worked on such short films as Phone (1997), The Boogie Man (1999), Area 51 (2002), Easy Street (2003), A Dublin Story (2003), Past Pupil (2005), and Nuts (2007). Feature films include The Crooked Mile (2001), Starfish (2004), King Arthur (2004), and All Is by My Side (2013).

Television includes RTÉ One drama Glenroe, in which he played property developer Dan Reilly from 1998 to 2001. In 2008, McKinney took part in RTÉ Two observational documentary series Hollywood Trials.

McKinney's more recent work includes the IFTA-Nominated Anton (2008), Handheld (2009), and Good Arrows (2009). In 2010, McKinney took the role of businessman Alexander Moog in October Eleven Pictures' feature film A Christmas Carol, adapted for the screen and directed by Jason Figgis.

In March 2009, Guinness announced that the Anticipation advert would be aired again as part of a "Classic Ads" campaign to mark the brewery's 250th anniversary. However, despite the popularity of the commercial, McKinney was excluded from the Arthur's Day celebrations which were held to mark the brewery's 250th anniversary.

A Founding Member and artistic director of The Attic Studio, McKinney is a Reiki Master/Teacher, and a priest in the Order of Melchizedek, Melchizedek Priesthood, and a Minister of the Universal Life Church.
