= Anticipation (advertisement) =

Advertising campaign for Guinness beer

- The poster advertisement for the Anticipation campaign
- Agency: Arks Ltd.
- Client: Guinness plc now Diageo
- Running time: 60 seconds
- Product: Guinness draught stout
- Release dates: 18 May 1994 (IRE); 1995 (UK)
- Directed by: Richie Smyth
- Music by: Pérez Prado
- Starring: Joe McKinney Gordon Winter
- Production company: Littlebird Productions
- Country: Ireland
- Preceded by: Chain (UK)
- Followed by: Old Man (UK)
- Official website: http://www.guinness.com/

Anticipation is an Irish advertisement launched by Guinness plc in 1994 to promote Guinness-brand draught stout. The advert, which appeared in print, posters, and cinema and television spots, was conceived by Irish advertising agency Arks, and starred relatively unknown Irish actor Joe McKinney as the 'Dancing Man' and Gordon Winter as the barman. It was the final part of the "Guinness Time" advertising campaign, which had been running in Ireland since the late 1980s.

The advert was credited with increasing Guinness' sales, market share and brand awareness figures. However, controversy arose following claims of plagiarism raised by British director Mehdi Norowzian, who launched an unsuccessful lawsuit in 1998 seeking remuneration for the use of techniques and style from his 1992 short film Joy.

== Sequence ==
The low-budget ad featured only two characters: a patron of a pub and the barman serving him. The patron (McKinney) orders a pint of Guinness stout and, while waiting for the pint to be poured, carries out a series of quirky dancing movements with the settling pint in the foreground, to the amusement of the barman (Winter). The piece ends with the patron taking his first sip of the freshly poured pint overlaid by the Guinness advertising slogan "No time like Guinness Time". The advert is set to Guaglione by Pérez Prado, and makes heavy use of jump cutting from a static camera to allow the dancer to make a series of movements that could not be achieved in reality.

== Reception ==
The distinctive jump cut editing techniques of Anticipation won the commercial critical acclaim and several awards from within the advertising industry, including the 1995 Institute of Creative Advertising & Design craft award to Hugh Chaloner for editing as well as a Gold Medal for editing and a Golden Shark award at the Kinsale International Advertising Festival.

The success of the campaign led Guinness to re-broadcast it in the United Kingdom in 1995, as a transition between the campaign "The Man With the Guinness"/"Pure Genius", which had just concluded with Chain, and its new "Black and White" campaign, still in development. Though Chain was to be the last in the Pure Genius campaign, Anticipation was tagged with the Pure Genius slogan in the UK instead of There's No Time Like Guinness Time.

As a result of its featuring in the spot, Pérez Prado's Guaglione reached the Number 1 spot in the Irish music charts, and Number 2 in the British Top 40.

== Lawsuit ==
In 1992, British director Mehdi Norowzian submitted a show reel containing a number of short examples of his work to several prospective employers, including the Irish advertising agency Arks Ltd., in the hopes of being taken on to direct one or more of their commercials. Included on the reel was a short piece entitled Joy, which was shot using a static camera on a London rooftop and comprised a jump cut sequence of a man performing an extended dance of exuberance against a plain canvas background.

Arks Ltd. were contracted by Guinness to produce an advertisement to run in Ireland. Among the ideas proposed was one based on a scene from the cinematic version of Roddy Doyle's novel, The Snapper, where a man rushes into a pub to celebrate the birth of his grandson with a pint of Guinness. The artistic director at Arks, thinking of possible ways to build on the concept, recalled Norowzian's submitted reel and came up with a script and storyboard based on Joy to present to Guinness. The idea was accepted, and Arks approached Norowzian to direct the commercial. Norowzian refused, as he was unwilling to simply "commercialise" an old idea, and wanted to create something new. The agency then took on Richie Smyth as director, urging him to create something "with an atmosphere broadly similar to that portrayed in Joy". Feeling that the original storyboard was too close to Joy, a new one was prepared. The result was Anticipation.

Following the broadcast of the television spot in 1994, Norowzian lodged a complaint and ultimately a lawsuit against Arks Ltd. and Guinness, claiming that Anticipation breached his copyrights and accusing the agency of passing off. The plaintiff's claim for copyright infringement were based on a passage in the Copyright, Designs and Patents Act 1988 defining a dramatic work as including "recordings of a work of dance or mime", and that Anticipation was, or included, a copy of a substantial part of Joy. The case reached the High Court in 1997, where the claim of passing off was dropped. On 17 July 1998, Justice Rattee rendered his judgment that the jump cutting techniques used in Joy produced something qualitatively different from a recording of a dance or mime routine and that, as such, Joy was not in itself a dramatic work. It was therefore defined as an entrepreneurial work, a status which confers protection over only the physical recording of a work rather than the work itself. He also ruled that Anticipation did not reproduce either the whole or part of Joy.

The decision was appealed, but while the Court of Appeal unanimously held that the content of a film (including the use of film and editing techniques) could enjoy copyright protection as a dramatic work, the presiding Justices ruled that Anticipation did not significantly copy any portion of Joy and dismissed the case. Ultimately, Norowzian was ordered to pay £200,000 in legal costs. As a result of the case, the Institute of Contemporary Arts called for reform of copyright law in the United Kingdom.

== Legacy ==
Actor Joe McKinney spent 1994–6 making personal appearances around Europe publicising Guinness. The lifestyle became too hectic and he gave up alcohol in 1997. He found it difficult to secure other roles due to typecasting as "the Guinness man", spending time in the US where the ad had not been broadcast.

A comparison of two frames from Anticipation with their respective versions in Eskimo.

As one of the most recognisable Guinness advertisements of the 1990s, Anticipation has been mimicked or parodied in a number of more recent Guinness campaigns, including the Irish Waiting spot in 2004 promoting cans of Guinness draught beer, and director JJ Keith's British Eskimo commercial, which was part of an extended campaign promoting Guinness Extra Cold in summer 2004 and 2005. Anticipation was again parodied in a 2024 stop-motion advertisement for Guinness Nitrosurge titled Dancing Can, which showed a can of Guinness, adorned with the Nitrosurge device, pouring a pint and dancing to the original music while waiting for the pint to settle.

The use of Pérez Prado's music was continued by Abbott Mead Vickers BBDO's 1998 Guinness TV ad Swimblack, which featured his "Mambo No. 5". (Lou Bega's hit cover of "Mambo No. 5" came out the following year.)

In March 2009, Guinness announced that Anticipation would be aired again as part of a "Classic Ads" campaign to mark the brewery's 250th anniversary.

== See also ==
- Guinness advertising
- Chain (advertisement)
