= Raoul Martinez =

French painter (1876–1974)

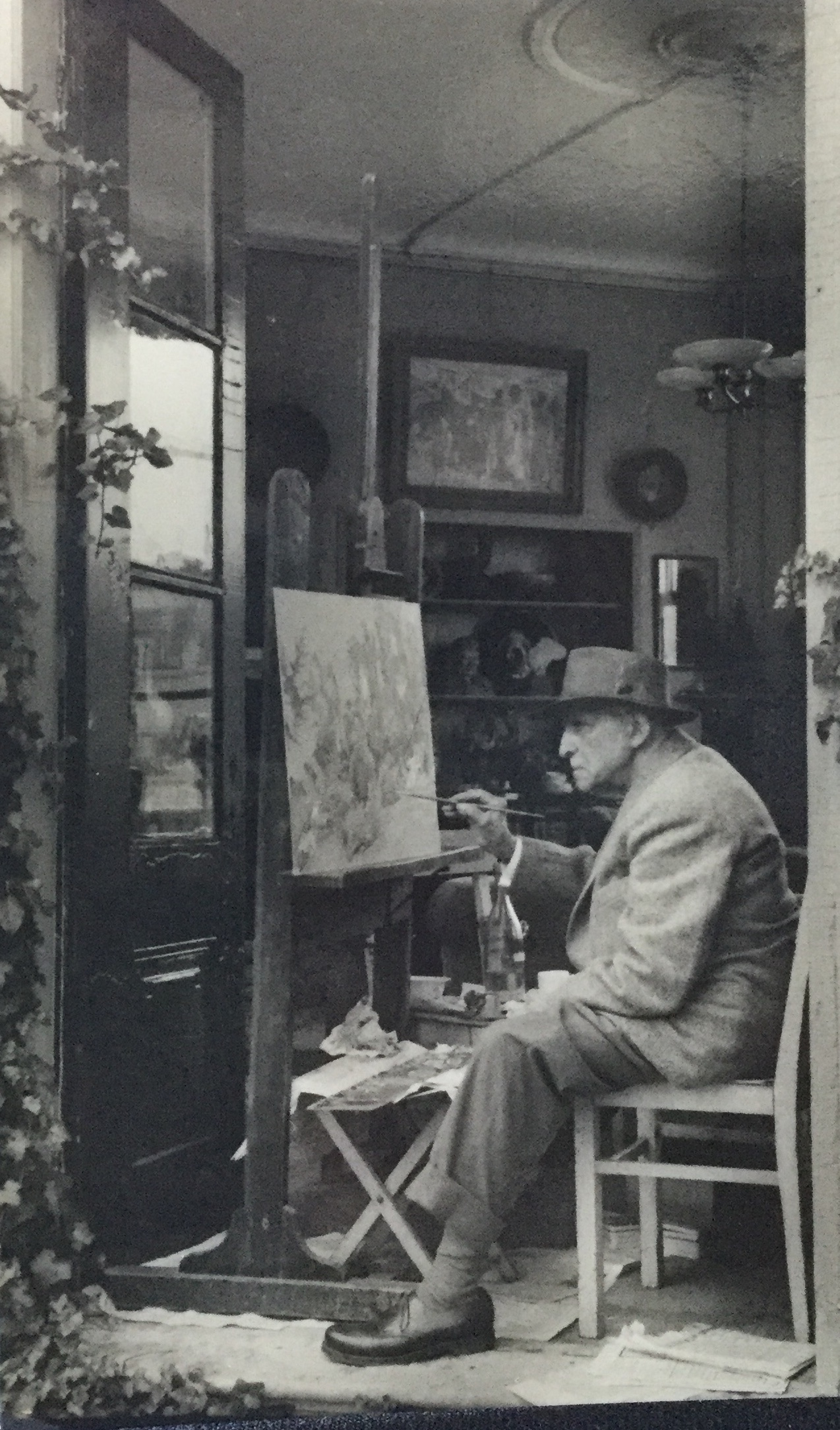
- Martinez at work c. 1955
- Born: Raphael Jules (Raoul) Martinez; September 9, 1876; Paris, France
- Died: September 18, 1974 (aged 98); Neuilly-sur-Seine, France
- Known for: Painting

Raoul Martinez (1876–1974) was a French artist.

== Life ==
The French painter Raoul Martinez was born in 1876 from well-to-do parents who lived in Paris, France. The family owned a hacienda near Havana. After his education in Paris, Martinez worked for some years at the estate. He had a Cuban background and he had Cuban connections for many years. After his stay there, he returned to Europe, first to Brussels, where he lived from 1896 till about 1915. In Brussels, he started his career as a painter in 1907 and had his first exhibition at La Libre Esthétique in 1910. During the First World War and thereafter, he worked a couple of periods in the Netherlands and in Belgium; after the Second World War he settled in Paris.

== Exhibitions ==
The Netherlands

- La Libre Esthétique (Brussels), 1910, 1911
- De Branding (Rotterdam and Utrecht), 1918, (Rotterdam) 1919
- Vereniging Voor de Kunst (Utrecht), 1918, 1921, 1923, 1927, 1934
- Exhibitions at many other Dutch art associations and Dutch art galleries (in Amsterdam and The Hague) 1921 and thereafter
- Solo exhibition in the Haags Gemeentemuseum (The Hague), 1956
- Solo exhibition in museum De Wieger (Deurne), 1999

Belgium

- Galerie San Salvador (Brugge), 1926

France

- Galerie Imberti (Bordeaux), 1938

Switzerland

- Galerie Max Rohr (Bern), 1951

== Museum collections ==
The Netherlands

- Centraal Museum, Utrecht
- Haags Gemeentemuseum, The Hague
- Museum De Wieger, Deurne
- Rijksmuseum Kröller-Müller, Otterlo

France

- Musée d’Art Moderne de la Ville de Paris
