= Swimblack =

Advertising campaign for Guinness beer

Swimblack / Swim Black
- Agency: Abbott Mead Vickers BBDO, London
- Client: Diageo
- Language: English
- Running time: 60 seconds
- Product: Guinness draught stout
- Release date: 16 May 1998 (television)
- Directed by: Jonathan Glazer
- Music by: Pérez Prado
- Production company: Academy Commercials, London
- Produced by: Nick Morris; Yvonne Chalkley (agency producer)
- Country: United Kingdom
- Budget: £3 million (campaign)
- Followed by: Surfer (Guinness)
- Official website: www.guinness.com/ie_en/ads/classic/1990sTVs/swimblack/

Swimblack (also written as Swim Black) is a 1998 advertisement for Guinness-brand draught stout which was broadcast in the United Kingdom. It is the first in the Good things come to those who wait advertising campaign created by Abbott Mead Vickers BBDO who had won the Guinness account from Ogilvy & Mather in January 1998. The centrepiece of the Swimblack campaign is a 60-second television and cinema commercial written by Tom Carty, art directed by Walter Campbell and directed by Jonathan Glazer, which depicted an aging local sports hero's annual swimming race from an offshore buoy to his brother's seafront pub against the "clock" of pint of Guinness being "correctly" poured at the bar. The brother declares that the hero will "never lose" as the punchline of the commercial shows the brother starting the clock a little later each year. The ad was shot in the remote Italian village of Monopoli and used local villagers for the crowd scenes. The aims of the campaign were to promote Guinness in general, to turn around the negative consumer opinion of the length of time required to correctly pour a pint of Guinness from the tap, usually quoted as 119.5 seconds, and to encourage bartenders to take the time to do so.

Print and billboard spots for Swimblack each tied back to the central theme of the campaign, which was successful at boosting sales, particularly among the older male demographic. The television/cinema commercial proved fairly popular with critics within the advertising and television industries, netting a number of awards – including a Creative Circle Gold for Best Editing and a gold in the British Television Advertising Awards in the Alcoholic Beverages category. Following the success of Swimblack, permission was granted by Diageo, owners of the Guinness brand, to AMV BBDO to pursue the campaign further, and led to the creation of the 1999 piece, Surfer.

The soundtrack uses Pérez Prado's "Mambo No. 5", continuing an association which began in 1994 when Arks Ltd.'s Guinness TV ad Anticipation used Pérez Prado's version of Guaglione as its soundtrack. (Lou Bega's hit cover of "Mambo No. 5" came out the following year.)

== Additional credits ==
- Creative Director: Peter Souter
- Copywriter: Tom Carty
- Art Director: Walter Campbell
- Director of Photography: Ivan Bird
- Editor: Rick Lawley
- Music Production Company: Air-Edel Associates, London
- Music Arranger: Graham Preskett
- Online: Smoke & Mirrors, London
