= Birth (2004 film) =

2004 film by Jonathan Glazer

- Theatrical release poster
- Directed by: Jonathan Glazer
- Written by: Jean-Claude Carrière; Milo Addica; Jonathan Glazer
- Produced by: Jean-Louis Piel; Nick Morris; Lizie Gower
- Starring: Nicole Kidman; Lauren Bacall; Cameron Bright; Danny Huston; Arliss Howard; Peter Stormare; Ted Levine; Anne Heche
- Cinematography: Harris Savides
- Edited by: Sam Sneade; Claus Wehlisch
- Music by: Alexandre Desplat
- Production company: Fine Line Features
- Distributed by: New Line Cinema (United States); Entertainment Film Distributors (United Kingdom); Warner Bros. (Germany)
- Release dates: September 8, 2004 (Venice); October 29, 2004 (United States); November 5, 2004 (United Kingdom); December 23, 2004 (Germany)
- Running time: 100 minutes
- Countries: United States; United Kingdom; Germany
- Language: English
- Budget: $20 million
- Box office: $23.9 million

Birth is a 2004 psychological drama mystery film co-written and directed by Jonathan Glazer, and starring Nicole Kidman, Lauren Bacall, Cameron Bright, Danny Huston, Arliss Howard, Peter Stormare, Ted Levine, Anne Heche, and Cara Seymour. Its plot follows a woman who becomes convinced that her deceased husband has been reincarnated in a ten-year-old boy.

Glazer began developing the idea for Birth after completing his first film, Sexy Beast (2000), eventually co-writing the screenplay with Milo Addica and novelist and screenwriter Jean-Claude Carrière. An international co-production between the United States, the United Kingdom, and Germany, Birth was filmed on location in New York City in early 2003.

Birth premiered in competition at the 61st Venice International Film Festival before being theatrically released in the United States on October 29, 2004. It polarized critics upon its release and grossed $23.9 million on a budget of $20 million. Kidman was nominated for a Golden Globe Award for Best Actress for her performance. The film has been re-evaluated in later years, receiving praise and cult following.

== Plot ==
Sean and Anna are a married couple living in New York City. He is heard lecturing to an unseen audience, explaining that he does not believe in reincarnation. Afterwards, Sean goes jogging, collapses, and dies.

Ten years later, Anna accepts a marriage proposal from her new fiancé, Joseph. When Clifford, Sean's brother, arrives at Anna's engagement party, his wife Clara excuses herself, saying she forgot to wrap a gift. Instead, she buys a replacement after hurriedly burying the original one while a young boy secretly looks on.

Some time later, at a party for Anna's mother, the boy sneaks into the apartment and claims to be Sean. At first, Anna dismisses the boy's claim. When she receives a letter from him the next day, warning her not to marry Joseph, she realizes the boy truly believes he is her reincarnated husband.

That night, Anna and Joseph discuss the letter. Since the building watchman seems to know the boy and that his name is actually Sean, Joseph calls to obtain more information. When Sean answers the phone, Joseph rushes downstairs to confront him. He takes him to Sean's father and the three of them order Sean to leave Anna alone. He refuses to recant his story and she watches him collapse in his father's arms.

Sean leaves a message on Anna's answering machine, which her mother overhears. That day at lunch, Anna's mother mentions that Sean wants to meet Anna in the park and that she will know where exactly. Anna hurries to Central Park and finds him waiting in the spot where her husband died. He offers to submit to questioning.

Anna's brother-in-law Bob, a doctor, talks to Sean, recording his responses on tape. Sean answers all the questions, even providing intimate details of Anna and Sean's sex life. Sean is brought to Anna's by his mother and he is able to identify the associations between the dead man and different parts of the apartment. Everyone except Anna remains doubtful. Anna's family becomes worried, particularly her sister Laura, who treats Sean with contempt.

When Anna misses an appointment with her fiancé to spend time with Sean, Joseph begins feeling worried, not merely about the boy but Anna's odd behavior. His jealousy is made plain when he physically attacks Sean. When the boy runs out, Anna follows him and they kiss on the lips.

Anna seems convinced by the boy's story so she asks Clara and Clifford to meet him. Clara encounters Sean at the door and we learn that she and the dead man were lovers. She asks the boy to visit her later. When Sean does, his backpack is full of Anna's love letters to Sean.

This package was meant to be Clara's spiteful engagement gift, which the boy had secretly unearthed and read the night of the party. The dead man had given Anna's letters to her unopened as proof of his love. When Clara points out to Sean that if he were really a reincarnation, he would have come to her first, he runs out, confused. The thought that in order to be Sean he would have to love Clara convinces him he cannot carry on.

When Anna finds Sean, she suggests they run away and marry when he is of legal age. He tells her that he is not the dead man. Anna apologizes to Joseph, and they are married near a beach. Anna wades into the ocean's edge in anguish after the ceremony. Joseph finds her to calm her, whispering into her ear.

== Cast ==
- Nicole Kidman as Anna
- Lauren Bacall as Eleanor
- Cameron Bright as young Sean
- Danny Huston as Joseph
- Arliss Howard as Bob
- Peter Stormare as Clifford
- Ted Levine as Mr. Conte
- Cara Seymour as Mrs. Conte
- Alison Elliott as Laura
- Anne Heche as Clara
- Zoe Caldwell as Mrs. Hill
- Novella Nelson as Lee

== Production ==
=== Development ===
Jonathan Glazer, after directing his first feature, Sexy Beast (2000), was interested in making a film about "the idea of eternal love" and a "mystery of the heart". While writing the script, he was not interested in making a ghost story or a "paranormal piece". He envisioned a fairy tale structure early on. The initial idea for the film came to him one day when he was in his kitchen: "There's this little kid and he tells a woman he's her dead husband – and he's ten years old." Glazer went to Paris to discuss the idea with French screenwriter Jean-Claude Carrière at his producer's recommendation. Carrière ended up helping Glazer with the story and acted as a script consultant.

Glazer spent eight months going back and forth to Paris every weekend turning one paragraph into three acts. The script went through 21 drafts as Glazer and co-screenwriter Milo Addica worked on the story. During the writing process, Glazer was also beginning development of a film adaptation of Michel Faber's novel Under the Skin with Addica, and had planned to make that film before Birth. Glazer eventually directed this adaptation in 2013.

With only a few weeks before principal photography was to begin, Glazer and Addica decided to refocus the entire film. Originally, the script was about the boy and they changed it to be about the woman instead. "We aimed to make something robust in which every question leads to another," said Glazer. "I'm not a Buddhist and I don't believe in reincarnation; I don't think I could do a film about it if I did. I was more interested in the idea of eternal love. I wanted to make a mystery, the mystery of the heart."

=== Casting ===
Actress Nicole Kidman read the screenplay and wanted to do the film when she found out that Glazer was directing, as she loved his previous film, Sexy Beast. She approached the director about doing the film. At first, he resisted because he felt that "her celebrity is so everywhere that I thought it could only hurt the delicate nature of this character". However, he met with Kidman and realized that "she was ready to inhabit the role". The more he talked to Kidman about her character, he would rewrite the script on weekends, tailoring it specifically for her. To show Anna in mourning both externally and internally, Glazer gave her short hair, spare wardrobe, and short, clipped speech. The director explained Anna's appearance as "somebody who had sort of let all glamor go and sexuality go". Kidman said that Glazer instructed her to do small, personal reactions. She found the character to be all-consuming so she could not separate herself from the role. To research for the role, Kidman spoke to two friends who had lost their fathers and they talked about how it still affected them years after.

=== Filming ===
Principal photography of Birth began in early 2003 in New York City. During filming, Kidman was allowed two days off to attend the 75th Academy Awards in Los Angeles, where she won the award for Best Actress for The Hours (2002).

Addica and Glazer often wrote scenes the day before they were shot, giving them to the actors on the actual day they were shooting.

== Music ==
The original score for Birth was composed by French composer Alexandre Desplat. The film also features two compositions by Richard Wagner, as well as the popular song "Tonight You Belong to Me" performed by Patience and Prudence.

== Release ==
Birth premiered at the 61st Venice International Film Festival on September 8, 2004. New Line Cinema released it theatrically in the United States on October 29, 2004. The film had its British release the following week, on November 5, 2004.

=== Home media ===
New Line Home Entertainment released Birth on DVD on April 19, 2005. The Criterion Collection released the film on 4K UHD Blu-ray and Blu-ray on January 27, 2026.

== Reception ==
=== Box office ===
Birth grossed $5.1 million in the United States and Canada, and $18.8 million in other territories, for a worldwide total of $23.9 million. In the United States and Canada, the film opened at number 12 on its opening weekend, grossing $1.3 million from 550 theaters.

=== Critical response ===
At its premiere at the Venice International Film Festival, the film's first press screening was greeted with reported booing and catcalls. Glazer responded, "People are a bit polarised by it, which is healthy".

On the review aggregator website Rotten Tomatoes, the film holds an approval rating of 43% based on 152 reviews, with an average rating of 6.1/10. The website's critics consensus reads, "A well-mounted production is undermined by a muddled, absurd storyline of questionable taste." Metacritic, which uses a weighted average, assigned the film a score of 51 out of 100, based on 38 critics, indicating "mixed or average" reviews.

In his review for Newsweek, David Ansen wrote, "the script is hooey. Birth is ridiculous, and oddly unforgettable". Michael O'Sullivan, in his review for The Washington Post, wrote, "What I'm not so fond of is the cop-out ultimately taken by the filmmakers, who can't seem to follow through on their promisingly metaphysical premise (let alone the theme of obsessive love), electing instead to eliminate all ambiguity". In his review for the New York Daily News, Jack Mathews called the film, "corny, plodding, implausible and – on occasion – seriously creepy".

However, Roger Ebert gave the film three-and-a-half stars out of four and compared it to Rosemary's Baby saying, "Birth is less sensational and more ominous, and also more intriguing because instead of going for quick thrills, it explores what might really happen if a 10-year-old turned up and said what Sean says". In his review for The New York Times, A. O. Scott praised Nicole Kidman's performance: "Without Ms. Kidman's brilliantly nuanced performance, Birth might feel arch, chilly and a little sadistic, but she gives herself so completely to the role that the film becomes both spellbinding and heartbreaking, a delicate chamber piece with the large, troubled heart of an opera." Birth was ranked at number 96 on Slant Magazine's best films of the 2000s. Writing in The Guardian in August 2010, film critic David Thomson included the film in his list of "10 lost works of genius".

=== Controversy ===
The film generated controversy due to a scene wherein Kidman's character shares a bath with Bright's character, both apparently naked. In fact, Bright was never naked and the two were never even in the same room during the filming of the bath scene apart from one camera shot, and when this shot happened both wore special clothes that were not visible to the camera. Glazer insists that the scene is not erotic or exploitative. "I can imagine that, before people see it, they might think it was salacious. But I knew it was never going to be that."

At a press conference at the Venice Film Festival, Kidman addressed the controversy of her character kissing a boy: "It wasn't that I wanted to make a film where I kiss a 10-year-old boy. I wanted to make a film where you understand love." Further controversy occurred at the festival when a journalist described Kidman as a "screen legend", to which her co-star Lauren Bacall replied, "She is a beginner". Kidman downplayed Bacall's remarks and said, "I certainly don't feel like a big star in Hollywood".

Complaints of the film's "cop-out" ending are questioned by Roger Ebert in his review, who notes: "There seem to be two possible explanations for what finally happens, but neither one is consistent with all of the facts."

=== Accolades ===
Award/association	Year	Category	Recipient(s) and nominee(s)	Result	Ref.
Critics' Choice Awards	2005	Best Young Performer	Cameron Bright	Nominated	
Gold Derby Awards	2005	Best Original Score	Alexandre Desplat	Nominated	
Golden Globe Awards	2005	Best Actress in a Motion Picture – Drama	Nicole Kidman	Nominated	
International Cinephile Society	2005	Best Original Score	Alexandre Desplat	Won	
International Cinephile Society	2005	Best Picture	Birth	Nominated	
International Cinephile Society	2005	Best Actress	Nicole Kidman	Nominated	
International Cinephile Society	2005	Best Cinematography	Harris Savides	Nominated	
London Film Critics' Circle	2005	Actress of the Year	Nicole Kidman	Nominated	
Los Angeles Film Critics Association	2005	Best Original Score	Alexandre Desplat	Nominated	
Online Film Critics Society	2005	Best Original Score	Alexandre Desplat	Nominated	
Saturn Awards	2005	Best Fantasy Film	Birth	Nominated	
Saturn Awards	2005	Best Actress	Nicole Kidman	Nominated	
Saturn Awards	2005	Best Performance by a Younger Actor	Cameron Bright	Nominated	
Sitges Film Festival	2004	Best Film	Birth	Nominated	
Sitges Film Festival	2004	Citizen Kane Award for Best Directorial Revelation – Special Mention	Jonathan Glazer	Won	
Venice International Film Festival	2004	Golden Lion	Birth	Nominated	
Young Artist Awards	2005	Best Performance in a Feature Film – Supporting Young Actor	Cameron Bright	Nominated	

== Legacy ==
While the film divided critics and audiences mostly "stayed away" upon release, the reception of the film has been reassessed over the years, with some publications calling it a masterpiece and Kidman's performance recognized as one of the best of her career. The film went on to establish a cult following.
