= Surfer (advertisement) =

Advertising campaign for Guinness beer

- This shot shows the distinctive black and white stock and the metaphor of "white horses" illustrating the power of the wave.
- Agency: Abbott Mead Vickers BBDO, London
- Client: Diageo
- Language: English
- Running time: 60 seconds
- Product: Guinness draught stout
- Release date: 17 March 1999 (television)
- Directed by: Jonathan Glazer
- Music by: "Phat Planet" by Leftfield
- Starring: Rusty Keaulana (surfer) Louis Mellis (voiceover)
- Production company: Academy Commercials, London
- Produced by: Nick Morris; Yvonne Chalkley (agency producer)
- Country: United Kingdom
- Budget: £6 million (campaign)
- Preceded by: Swimblack
- Followed by: Bet on Black

Surfer is an integrated advertising campaign launched in 1999 by Diageo to promote Guinness-brand draught stout in the United Kingdom. The cornerstone of the campaign is a television commercial, originally 60 seconds long, which centred on a Polynesian surfer successfully taking on a gigantic wave. Shot in Hawaii over a nine-day period and directed by Jonathan Glazer, the piece went on to win more awards than any other commercial in 1999 (Clio Awards, D&AD Awards, Cannes Lions), and in 2000 was voted the "Best ad of all time" in a poll conducted by Channel 4 and The Sunday Times.

The plot centers on a group of surfers, waiting for the perfect wave. As it arrives, the crashing 'white horses' turn into actual horses. One by one, a surfer 'crashes out', leaving only one, who manages to conquer the wave. The others join him as they celebrate on the shore.

The advert was inspired by Walter Crane's 1893 painting "Neptune's Horses". The text also draws inspiration from Herman Melville's novel Moby Dick, including the line "Ahab says, 'I don't care who you are, here's to your dream.'" (which does not actually appear in the novel).

The music track in the advert was created by British band Leftfield and eventually formed the basis of their track "Phat Planet" which appears on their 1999 album Rhythm and Stealth. Its use in the advertisement led to the song appearing on several compilation albums of music from advertisements including Classic Ads (2002), I Love TV Ads (2004) and Guinness 250: Music from the TV Ads (2009).

An extended 90-second version is available on the 2005 DVD The Work of Director Jonathan Glazer.

In November 2009, The Independent named the advertisement, alongside several other advertisements in the campaign, amongst the "greatest advertising of all time".

== Accolades ==
Creator	Country	Accolade	Year	Rank	Source
Channel 4 and The Sunday Times	United Kingdom	The 100 Greatest TV Ads	2000	1	
ITV	United Kingdom	ITV's Best Ever Ads	2005	6	
The Mirror	United Kingdom	The Top Ten Greatest Ever Guinness Adverts	2009	*	
Business Pundit	United States	The 10 Most Creative Commercials Ever	2011	6	
Empire	United Kingdom	15 Amazing Adverts from 15 Amazing Directors	2011	*	
Adweek	United States	10 Most-Viral Guinness Commercials Ever	2012	5	
Mashable UK	United Kingdom	20 Most-Shared Guinness Ads on YouTube	2012	6	
The Savory	United States	Top 10 Guinness Commercials	2014	1	
Cinematica	United Kingdom	Top 10 Best Adverts Ever Made	2014	3	

The asterisk (*) denotes an unordered list.

== Additional credits ==
- Account Executive: Gavin Thompson
- Creative Director: David Abbott
- Copywriter: Tom Carty
- Art Director: Walter Campbell
- Directors of Photography: Ivan Bird, Don King (water), Lee Allison (aerial)
- Production Designer: Ben Myhill
- Editor: Sam Sneade, Sam Sneade Editing, London
- Sound Design Wave Studios, London
- Sound Designer: Johnnie Burn
- Music Production Company: Soundtree Music Limited (www.soundtreemusic.com)
- Music Supervisor: Peter Raeburn
- VFX: The Computer Film Company, London
- VFX Designers: Dan Glass / Adrian de Wet / Paddy Eason / Tom Debenham
- VFX Artists: Gavin Toomey / Alex Payman / Joe Pavlo / Richard Clarke
- VFX 3D Supervisor: Dominic Parker
