= Jonathan Glazer =

English filmmaker (born 1965)

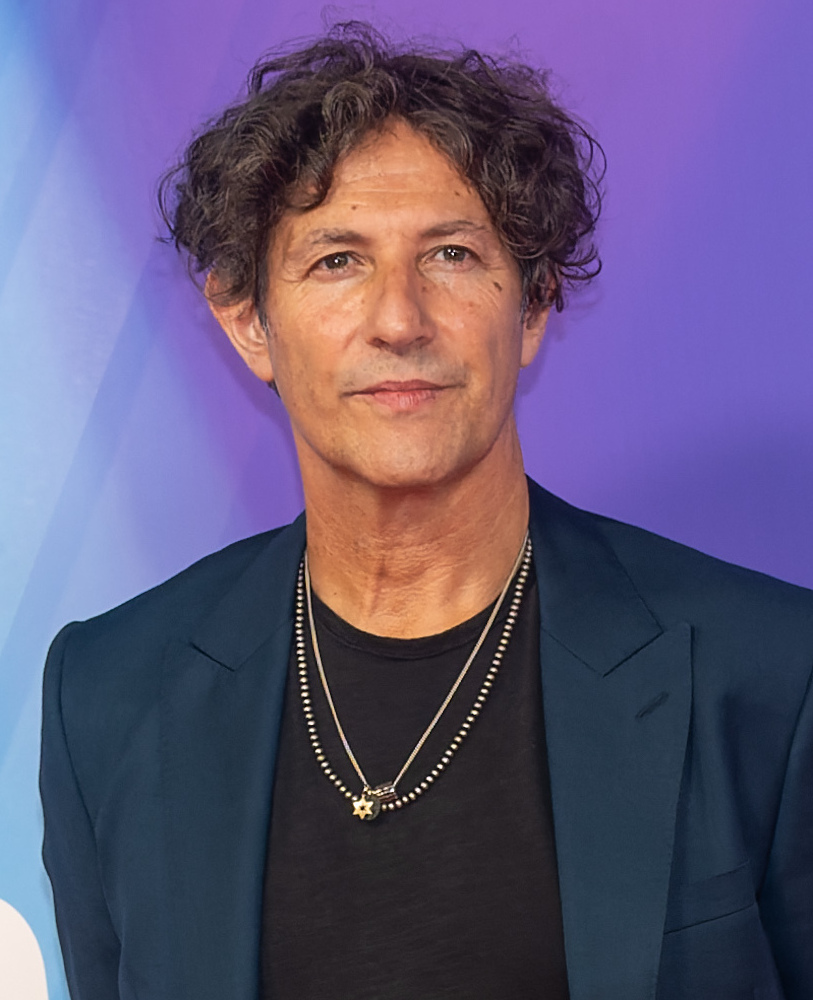
- Glazer in 2023
- Born: March 1965 (age 61); London, England
- Education: Nottingham Trent University (BA)
- Occupations: Film director; screenwriter
- Years active: 1993–present
- Notable work: Sexy Beast (2000); Birth (2004); Under the Skin (2013); The Zone of Interest (2023)
- Spouse: Rachael Penfold
- Children: 3

Jonathan Glazer (born March 1965) is an English filmmaker. He began his career in theatre before transitioning into film, directing the features Sexy Beast (2000), Birth (2004), Under the Skin (2013), and The Zone of Interest (2023). His accolades include an Academy Award, a BAFTA Award, a British Independent Film Award, and a César Award.

For the historical drama The Zone of Interest, he won the Grand Prix at the 2023 Cannes Film Festival and the BAFTA Award for Outstanding British Film and received Academy Award nominations for Best Director and Best Adapted Screenplay. Glazer also accepted the Academy Award for Best International Feature Film on behalf of the United Kingdom.

Glazer has also directed music videos for acts including Blur, Massive Attack, Radiohead, Richard Ashcroft and Jamiroquai. He received nominations for the MTV Video Music Award for Best Direction for his videos for Jamiroquai's "Virtual Insanity" (1996) and Radiohead's "Karma Police" (1997). He has directed commercials for brands including Kodak, Sony, Nike, Barclays, Guinness and Alexander McQueen.

== Early life and education ==
"There were all these fantastic characters, who were in and out of my house when I was a little boy. Many of them were East End Jews who had moved to the suburbs for a better quality of life, not super-intellectual people, but incredible entertainers – vaudeville musicians, writers and the like. As a child, I loved and absorbed the richness of that culture."

— Glazer about the artistic Jewish community in which he was raised

Jonathan Glazer was born in March 1965 in London, England, and is of Ashkenazi Jewish descent. His ancestors were Ukrainian Jews and Bessarabian Jews who fled the Kishinev pogrom and arrived in the United Kingdom in the 1900s. His great-grandparents, a tailor and a seamstress, were born in Vilnius and Odesa.

Growing up, the family lived in Hadley Wood, near Barnet in north London, and was Reform Jewish: "Synagogue three times a year, and Friday-night dinners every week". His father was a cinephile, with whom Jonathan watched David Lean, Sidney Lumet, Sydney Pollack, and Billy Wilder films.

Glazer attended the Jewish Free School, then located in the London Borough of Camden. He participated in the Givat Washington programme, spending five months in a religious boarding school in Israel. After finishing high school, he went to art school, saying drawing was the only thing he was good at.

After graduating with an emphasis in theatre design from Nottingham Trent University, Glazer began his career directing theatre and making film and television trailers.

== Career ==
=== 1993–1999: Music videos ===
In 1993, Glazer wrote and directed three short films ("Mad", "Pool" and "Commission"), and joined Academy Commercials, a production company based in Central London. He directed campaigns for Guinness (Dreamer, Swimblack and Surfer) and Stella Artois (Devil's Island).

Glazer directed the music videos for "Karmacoma" by Massive Attack and "The Universal" by Blur, both released in 1995. He worked with Radiohead on their videos for "Street Spirit" (1996) and "Karma Police" (1997). He said "Street Spirit" was a turning point in his work: "I knew when I finished that, because [Radiohead] found their own voices as an artist, at that point, I felt like I got close to whatever mine was, and I felt confident that I could do things that emoted, that had some kind of poetic as well as prosaic value."

Glazer won the MTV Video Music Award for Best Direction in 1997 for his work on "Karma Police" and Jamiroquai's "Virtual Insanity" (1996). He was unsatisfied with his "Karma Police" video, saying he had "missed emotionally and dramatically". He described his video for the 1998 single "Rabbit in Your Headlights", by Unkle and the Radiohead singer Thom Yorke, as a more successful partner to the "Karma Police" video. Glazer's 1999 television advert "Surfer", for Guinness, was voted the best of all time in a poll conducted by Channel 4 and The Sunday Times the following year.

=== 2000–2011: Sexy Beast and Birth ===
Glazer was set to direct the film Gangster No. 1, written by Louis Mellis and David Scinto, but was replaced after disagreements with the producers regarding casting. Glazer left the production along with Mellis and Scinto. In 2000, Glazer worked with Mellis and Scinto again, directing his first feature, the gangster film Sexy Beast. Ben Kingsley was nominated for the Academy Award for Best Supporting Actor. In 2004, Glazer directed his second feature film, Birth, starring Nicole Kidman.

In 2002, Glazer directed the "Odyssey" spot for Levi Strauss jeans. In 2006, he directed the second Sony BRAVIA TV advertisement, which took ten days and 250 people to film. It was filmed at an estate in Glasgow, and featured paint exploding all over the tower blocks. Later the same year, he was commissioned to make a television advert for the new Motorola Red phone. The advertisement, showing two naked black bodies emerging from a lump of flesh rotating on a potter's wheel, was due to air in September 2006 but was shelved by Motorola. The advertisement was to benefit several charities in Africa.

=== 2013: Under the Skin ===
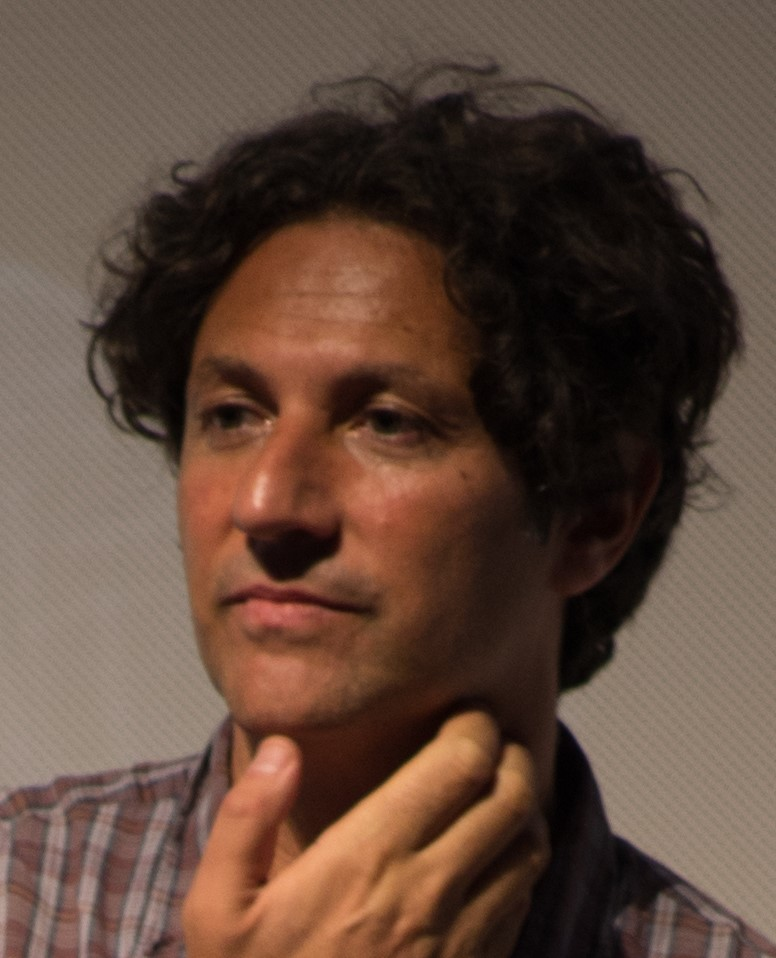
Glazer in 2013

In 2013, Glazer directed Under the Skin, a loose adaptation of the 2000 novel by Michel Faber, starring Scarlett Johansson. It premiered at the 2013 Telluride Film Festival and received a theatrical release in 2014. The film was named the best film of 2014 by numerous critics and publications, was included in many best-of-the-decade lists, and ranked 61st on the BBC's 100 Greatest Films of the 21st Century list, an international poll of 177 top critics.

=== 2023: The Zone of Interest ===
Glazer's fourth feature film, The Zone of Interest, based loosely on the 2014 novel by Martin Amis, premiered at the 2023 Cannes Film Festival to acclaim. It competed for the Palme d'Or, and won the Grand Prix and FIPRESCI Prize. The Zone of Interest won the Academy Award for Best International Feature Film, becoming the first British film to do so. The film also received three British Academy Film Awards, making it the first film to win both Best Film Not in the English Language and Outstanding British Film.

In his acceptance speech at the 96th Academy Awards, Glazer addressed the ongoing Gaza war:

All our choices are made to reflect and confront us in the present. Not to say, 'Look what they did then,' rather 'Look what we do now.' Our film shows where dehumanisation leads at its worst. It shaped all of our past and present. Right now, we stand here as men who refute their Jewishness and the Holocaust being hijacked by an occupation which has led to conflict for so many innocent people. Whether the victims of October 7th in Israel or the ongoing attack on Gaza, all the victims of this dehumanization—how do we resist?

=== 2026: NAZA ===
Glazer served as an executive producer on NAZA, a documentary film directed by Yuval Abraham and Rachel Szor. The film was produced by The Guardian and James Wilson of JW Films. NAZA received the Special Jury Prize at the 83rd Venice International Film Festival. According to The Guardian, the film was shot at night on the rooftops of Tel Aviv and documents the systems behind Israel's mass killing of Palestinian civilians in Gaza.

== Influences and style ==
Glazer named Stanley Kubrick as his favourite director and said he was close to Italian and Russian cinema, citing Ingmar Bergman, Rainer Werner Fassbinder, Federico Fellini, and Pier Paolo Pasolini as his greatest influences.

Glazer's filmmaking style is defined by depictions of flawed and desperate characters; by themes such as alienation, loneliness, and individualism; and by a bold visual style which uses an omniscient perspective and dramatic music.

== Personal life ==
Known to be discreet about his private life, Glazer is married to the visual effects supervisor Rachael Penfold. As of 2024 they were living in Camden, North London, with their three children. He is Jewish.

== Filmography ==
=== Feature film ===
Year	Title	Director	Writer
2000	Sexy Beast	Yes	No
2004	Birth	Yes	Yes
2013	Under the Skin	Yes	Yes
2023	The Zone of Interest	Yes	Yes

=== Short film ===
Year	Title	Director	Writer	Notes
1994	Mad	Yes	Yes	Also producer and editor
1997	Commission	Yes	Yes	
2019	The Fall	Yes	Yes	
2020	Strasbourg 1518	Yes	Yes	TV short
2020	First Light: Alexander McQueen	Yes	No	
2026	Joy Of Joys	Yes	TBA	

=== Music video ===
Year	Title	Artist
1995	"Karmacoma"	Massive Attack
1995	"The Universal"	Blur
1996	"Street Spirit (Fade Out)"	Radiohead
1996	"Virtual Insanity"	Jamiroquai
1997	"Into My Arms"	Nick Cave and the Bad Seeds
1997	"Karma Police"	Radiohead
1998	"Rabbit in Your Headlights"	UNKLE ft. Thom Yorke
2000	"A Song for the Lovers"	Richard Ashcroft
2006	"Live with Me"	Massive Attack
2009	"Treat Me Like Your Mother"	The Dead Weather

=== Commercials ===
Year	Title	Company
	"Husband to Be"	Kodak
	"Linda 2"	Pretty Polly
	"Shock of the New"	Mazda
	"Chief Executive's Wife"	AT&T
	"City"	Club Med
	"Sales Director"	AT&T
1996	"Frozen Moment"	Nike
	"New York"	Caffrey's
1997	"Parklife"	Nike
1998	"Swimblack"	Guinness
1998	"Lamppost"	BT Easyreach
1999	"Surfer"	Guinness
2000	"Kung Fu"	Levi Strauss
2000	"Last Orders"	Stella Artois
2000	"Devil's Island"	Stella Artois
2000	"Protection"	Volkswagen Polo
2000	"Whatever You Ride"	Wrangler
2001	"Dreamer"	Guinness
2002	"Odyssey"	Levi Strauss
2003	"Evil"	Barclays
2003	"Bull"	Barclays
2003	"Chicken"	Barclays
2004	"Bar"	Band Aid 20
2004	"Double Don"	Band Aid 20
2004	"Rant"	Band Aid 20
2004	"Razor"	Band Aid 20
2006	"Ice Skating Priests"	Stella Artois
2006	"Paint"	Sony BRAVIA
2006	"Clay"	Motorola Red
2010	"Temptation"	Cadbury's Flake
2010	"Kaka"	Sony 3D
2010	"Last Tango in Compton"	Volkswagen Polo
2013	"The Ring"	Audi
2014	"Risk Everything"	Nike
2019	"Flight"	Apple
2024	"The Galleria"	Prada
2026	“Generation Gucci”	Gucci

=== Idents ===
- Channel 4 presentation (September 2015)

== Awards and nominations ==
Organizations	Year	Category	Work	Result	Ref.
Academy Awards	2024	Best Director	The Zone of Interest	Nominated	
Academy Awards	2024	Best Adapted Screenplay	The Zone of Interest	Nominated	
Academy Awards	2024	Best International Film (Note: Despite accepting the award at the 96th Academy Awards, due to the Academy of Motion Picture Arts and Sciences guidelines, the country earns the accolade, not the director.)	The Zone of Interest	Won	
BAFTA Awards	2001	Outstanding British Film	Sexy Beast	Nominated	
BAFTA Awards	2015	Outstanding British Film	Under the Skin	Nominated	
BAFTA Awards	2024	Outstanding British Film	The Zone of Interest	Won	
BAFTA Awards	2024	Best Direction	The Zone of Interest	Nominated	
BAFTA Awards	2024	Best Adapted Screenplay	The Zone of Interest	Nominated	
Boston Society of Film Critics	2023	Best Adapted Screenplay	The Zone of Interest	Won	
Boston Society of Film Critics	2023	Best Director	The Zone of Interest	Won	
British Independent Film Awards	2001	Best Director	Sexy Beast	Won	
British Independent Film Awards	2013	Best Director	Under the Skin	Nominated	
Camerimage	2023	Golden Frog	The Zone of Interest	Nominated	
Cannes Film Festival	2023	Palme d'Or	The Zone of Interest	Nominated	
Cannes Film Festival	2023	Grand Prix	The Zone of Interest	Won	
Cannes Film Festival	2023	FIPRESCI Prize	The Zone of Interest	Won	
César Awards	2025	Best Foreign Film	The Zone of Interest	Won	
Cinema for Peace Dove	2025	Most Valuable Film of the Year	The Zone of Interest	Won	
Chicago Film Critics Association	2002	Most Promising Filmmaker	—N/a	Nominated	
Chicago Film Critics Association	2014	Best Adapted Screenplay	Under the Skin	Nominated	
Chicago Film Critics Association	2023	Best Adapted Screenplay	The Zone of Interest	Nominated	
European Film Awards	2023	European Film	The Zone of Interest	Nominated	
European Film Awards	2023	European Director	The Zone of Interest	Nominated	
European Film Awards	2023	European Screenwriter	The Zone of Interest	Nominated	
Gotham Awards	2014	Audience Award	Under the Skin	Nominated	
Gotham Awards	2014	Best Feature	Under the Skin	Nominated	
Gotham Awards	2023	Best International Feature	The Zone of Interest	Nominated	
Gotham Awards	2023	Best Screenplay	The Zone of Interest	Nominated	
Goya Awards	2025	Best European Film	The Zone of Interest	Nominated	
Independent Spirit Awards	2002	Best International Film	Sexy Beast	Nominated	
Independent Spirit Awards	2015	Best International Film	Under the Skin	Nominated	
Independent Spirit Awards	2024	Best International Film	The Zone of Interest	Nominated	
MTV Video Music Awards	1997	Best Direction	"Virtual Insanity"	Nominated	
MTV Video Music Awards	1997	Best Editing	"Virtual Insanity"	Nominated	
MTV Video Music Awards	1997	Best Special Effects	"Virtual Insanity"	Won	
MTV Video Music Awards	1998	Best Direction	"Karma Police"	Nominated	
Satellite Awards	2002	Best Director	Sexy Beast	Nominated	
Satellite Awards	2024	Best Director	The Zone of Interest	Nominated	
Satellite Awards	2024	Best Adapted Screenplay	The Zone of Interest	Nominated	
Venice International Film Festival	2004	Golden Lion	Birth	Nominated	
Venice International Film Festival	2013	Golden Lion	Under the Skin	Nominated	

== See also ==
- Independent cinema in the United Kingdom
- List of British film directors
- List of Academy Award winners and nominees from Great Britain
- List of European Academy Award winners and nominees
- List of Jewish Academy Award winners and nominees
