= Good things come to those who wait =

Good things come to those who wait may refer to:

- Good things come to those who wait (Guinness), a UK advertising campaign for Guinness stout in the 1990s and 2000s
- Good things come to those who wait (Heinz), a US advertising campaign for Heinz ketchup in the 1980s
- "Good things come to those who wait", a 1984 song by Nayobe
