= Avavav =

Swedish fashion label

Avavav (pronounced ahv-ahv-AHV) is a Swedish independent fashion brand founded in 2021. It is led by cofounders Beate Skonare Karlsson, the brand's creative director, and Johanna Blom, CEO. With a focus on "luxury streetwear," is celebrated for its irreverent runway concepts and theatrical shows that merge fashion with performance art.

== History ==
Avavav was founded in 2021 by Beate Skonare Karlsson. She is known for her extreme designs, including Kim Kardashian-inspired latex bodices, claw shoes, and sculptural silhouettes. Karlsson’s early tenure as creative director was marked by theatrical runway presentations. In Spring/Summer 2023, models deliberately fell on the runway during the collection Filthy Rich, which parodied fashion’s fixation on wealth and status. The Fall/Winter 2023 show, Fake It Till You Break It, featured garments intentionally designed to fall apart. Bags broke, heels snapped, and clothes detached mid-walk. Karlsson described it as an exploration of shame and failure, asking "what is the most embarrassing thing that can happen to a fashion house" and answering, "garments breaking might be it." The collection fused streetwear silhouettes, including tracksuits and oversized outerwear, some bearing the message "Hot, Rich, Famous," with sinuous bodysuits, cut-out dresses, miniskirts, low-cut tops, and printed chiffon gloves.

For Fall/Winter 2024, Karlsson drew from hateful commentary on social media. The show Thanks For Your Feedback included a stripped-back set with projected Instagram comments and audience members throwing trash at models. The collection featured Oxford shirts, velour hoodies, tailored jackets, and the brand’s four-fingered boots. Karlsson described the concept as placing online haters into a physical setting to observe whether they would, when prompted, engage by throwing objects, likening it to a "stoning-the-witch" scenario.

At Milan Fashion Week in September 2024, Avavav presented a conceptual Spring 2025 show in a sports arena, themed High fashion and low performance, to debut a collaboration with Adidas Originals. Models staged a mock 100-meter sprint in designs merging feminine elements with streetwear, including cropped Adicolor tracksuits, skeletal slashed hoodies, and sheer skirts. Accessories featured boxing glove mittens and Larva bags styled as mini Adidas Superstars. Referencing past viral stunts, the show critiqued fashion’s cyclical norms through performative design. Karlsson noted the overlap between the rule-bound worlds of fashion and sport, calling the fusion "fun." Unlike typical luxury-sportswear collaborations that emphasize performance, Karlsson’s partnership with Adidas remains rooted in fashion, transforming tracksuits into tailored suits and sneakers into stiletto-like designs. The collection included new Adidas Originals sneakers.

At Milan Fashion Week in March 2025, Avavav presented its Fall/Winter collection The Hole, which marked the second season of its collaboration with Adidas Originals. The show featured models emerging from grave-like pits onto a grass-covered runway, and explored themes of death, fragility, and control through gothic streetwear, skeletal-inspired designs, and armor-like silhouettes.

In May 2025, AVAVAV and Adidas Originals unveiled their second collaboration, launching under the tagline "High Fashion, Low Performance." The collection included avant-garde hoodies, exaggerated puffer vests, rouched pants, minimal shorts, and alien-like Moonrubber Megaride runners. The accompanying campaign contrasted athletes’ real performances with models’ failed attempts, reinforcing the collection’s satirical take on athleticism. Though rooted in sportswear, the designs were deliberately impractical.

Avavav has gained visibility in China through viral runway clips, user-generated content, and celebrity endorsements, including Blackpink’s Jennie wearing Avavav x Adidas. The Chinese market remains one of the brand’s most significant.

== Brand identity ==
Avavav, described as a "cult favourite," is known for theatrical, stunt-driven runway shows that merge fashion with performance art and often go viral. Its runway concepts, often characterized as "irreverent," frequently serve as commentary on industry pressures. Creative director Beate Karlsson employs street casting and positions the brand within the female-streetwear genre.

== Collections ==
- Spring/Summer 2022: Underwater Harmony
- Spring/Summer 2023: Filthy Rich
- Fall/Winter 2023: Fake It Till You Break It
- Spring/Summer 2024: No Time to Design, No Time to Explain
- Fall/Winter 2024: Thanks For Your Feedback
- Spring/Summer 2025: High Fashion, Low Performance
- Fall/Winter 2025: The Hole
