= Richard Farmer (disambiguation) =

Richard Farmer (1735–1797) was a Shakespearean scholar and Master of Emmanuel College, Cambridge.

Richard Farmer may also refer to:

- Richard T. Farmer, American businessman
- Richard Farmer (director), film, commercial and music video director
- Richie Farmer (born 1969), former Commissioner of Agriculture for the Commonwealth of Kentucky

== See also ==
- Farmer (surname)
