= Dog Breath =

2003 British television advertisement

- Agency: Abbott Mead Vickers
- Client: Wrigley's
- Language: English
- Running time: 40 seconds
- Product: Wrigley's X-cite
- Release date: 3 March 2003 (television)
- Written by: Mike Nicholson
- Directed by: Happy; Tom Riley (creative director)
- Production company: Arden Sutherland-Dodd
- Produced by: Nick Sutherland-Dodd
- Country: United Kingdom

Dog Breath is a 2003 British television advertisement for the short-lived Wrigley's chewing gum brand X-cite. Created by the agency Abbott Mead Vickers and directed by the duo Happy, the advertisement depicts a collapsed man vomiting a scruffy dog in a visual metaphor for 'dog breath'. To remove the smell, the man chews some gum and the dog disappears. Post-production company Framestore CFC were hired to create the sequence in which the man regurgitates the dog, employing computer animation.

Debuting on 3 March 2003, Dog Breath became the most complained-about advertisement in British television history, with the Independent Television Commission (ITC) recording 863 viewer complaints that the commercial made them physically sick or that it scared their children, who began fearing their pet dogs. On 13 March, Wrigley's issued an apology and agreed to restrict the advertisement to post-watershed hours to limit it being viewed by children, while the ITC announced an investigation as to whether the advert breached guidelines. Complaints continued to rise, and on 17 March, Wrigley's withdrew the advert completely, replacing it a week later with a new commercial for Orbit Ice White gum. Honoured at the D&AD Awards, Dog Breath's graphic content received wide media coverage.

== Synopsis ==
Named Dog Breath, the advertisement begins with a collapsed man waking on a sofa following a rough night out, with alcohol and a kebab on his breath. As he retches, a paw emerges from his mouth, followed by him vomiting out a wet, scruffy dog, which soon disappears when the man chews on some X-cite gum. The dog vomiting sequence denotes morning-after 'dog breath', with the dog vanishing as the man chews the gum demonstrating that X-cite can remove the bad smell. The closing message is a warning to "avoid dog breath".

== Production ==
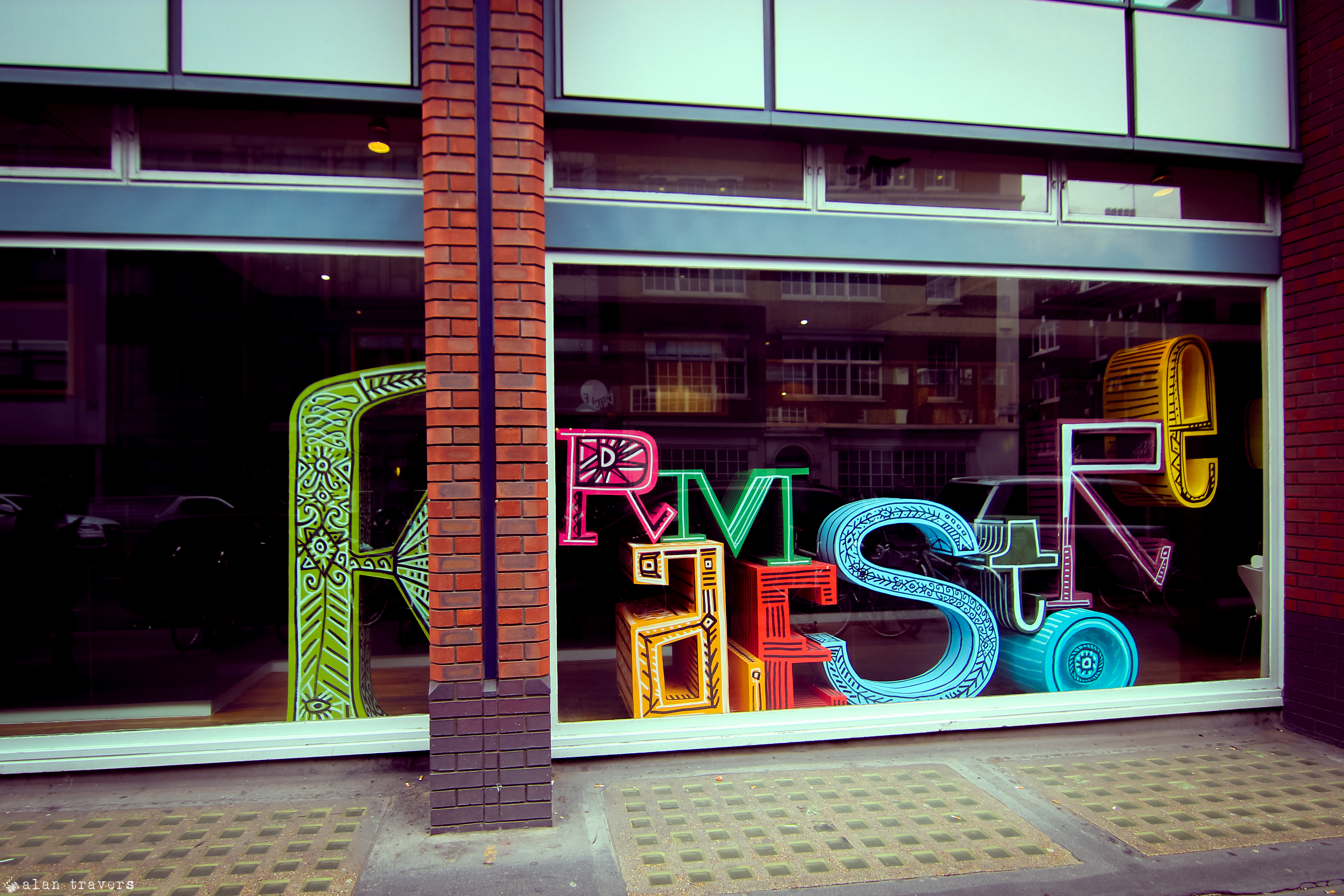
Framestore CFC (offices pictured) did post-production work on Dog Breath.

Written by Mike Nicholson, Dog Breath was created for X-cite, a British chewing gum from the UK-based subsidiary of American gum company Wrigley's. Wrigley's had launched X-cite in the United Kingdom in April 2002, and deemed its retail value at £13,000,000 by the end of that year.

The advertisement was created by the agency Abbott Mead Vickers BBDO, and directed by Happy, a directing duo of Los Angeles-based Richard Farmer and Guy Shelmerdine, who were represented by the production company Smuggler. Happy were known for directing commercials for Skittles, IKEA, Bacardi and Brawny when being asked to work on the ad. Discussing Bad Breath, Happy said they "love cleverness" and approach making commercials with this in mind. Tom Riley acted as creative director, while Arden and Nick Sutherland-Dodd acted as production company and producer, respectively.

The sequence in which the man regurgitates the dog was achieved with computer animation, with unusual special effects provided by post-production company Framestore CFC. Johnnie Burns and Wave were hired for the advert's sound design. The computer effects were used in tandem with practical effects created by Asylum Models & Effects, who created a bluescreen rig for the dog to pass through, which would be matched up with the actor's mouth in post-production, as well as puppet legs for the first sequence and a "mop" model dog to shake the slime in the air.

Dog Breath was first broadcast on 3 March 2003, and was seen by millions of viewers, particularly when screened during an episode of ITV's Cold Feet on Sunday 9 March, and then during Coronation Street, which had a viewership of 15 million. It was only intended to run for a limited time.

== Controversy and withdrawal ==
By 13 March 2003, Dog Breath had attracted some 580 complaints to the Independent Television Commission (ITC), setting the record for the highest number in its history. An ITC spokeswoman commented that they had been "flooded with complaints and the total is rising all the time", noting that parents protested that Dog Breath was scaring their children, while other adults said the advertisement made them physically sick themselves. The commission told CBBC Newsround that around 25% of the complaints were from parents of children who had become afraid of their pet dogs after seeing the commercial. As the ITC initiated an investigation as to whether the advert breached their guidelines, Wrigley's initially agreed to restrict Dog Breath to post-watershed hours, allowing no broadcast of it before 9pm, as means to prevent children seeing it. The company also issued an apology, writing that although only a fraction of those who had seen the ad had complained, they were saddened to learn they did not enjoy it, but added that "we are pragmatic in the realisation that it is almost impossible to create an advertisement that is engaging and powerful that everyone enjoys". The BBC also quoted Wrigley's as saying "it is not, nor has it ever been, our intention to upset anyone by our adverts."

Despite the ad being moved to a post-watershed slot, the complaints continued to rise, with its upsetting effect on children remaining the main factor. On 17 March, after the ITC had received more than 700 complaints, the advertisement was withdrawn completely, with Wrigley's announcing that they would replace it with a different commercial, and again apologising to viewers. The pulling received international news coverage through Reuters. In total, Dog Breath received 863 complaints, "earning it the dubious distinction of the UK's most complained-about TV ad of all time." The previous record holder was a 1998 advertisement for Levi's, which attracted 544 complaints for its portrayal of a dead hamster.

Following the withdrawal of Dog Breath, Wrigley's debuted a new advertisement, for its Orbit Ice White gum, on 24 March 2003. Using the slogan "Helps knock teeth stains into Orbit", the new campaign cost £3,700,000. In May 2003, the ITC stated that while they welcomed the voluntary withdrawal of Dog Breath, they had formally banned it from being shown again, deeming it an "appropriate outcome" after the unprecedented amount of complaints. Despite the wide press coverage that Dog Breath received, Wrigley's discontinued the X-cite range in August 2003, as the company sought to expand into a broader confectionary brand, launching a range of mints under the Extra umbrella later in the year.

== Legacy and appraisal ==
By 14 April 2003, Dog Breath was named the most discussed advertisement of the year so far in a survey of "ads that make news", conducted by Durrants and Propeller Communications, marking the first time in the survey's history that a campaign which did not feature a celebrity topped the list, beating out ads for Lynx Pulse, Daz and DBS Financial Services. Propeller director Martin Loat described the advertisement as "a good example of all publicity being good publicity", adding: "Although complaints and a ban prompted the national press stories, the coverage itself was not unduly negative and arguably did a great deal to enhance the brand's stock among its target consumers." Five of the other top eleven adverts in the list were also chiefly notable for their controversial content, including spots for McDonald's, Walker's Crisps and Double Velvet toilet tissue. Jane Simms of Campaign cited the controversy surrounding Dog Breath (alongside Pot Noodle's banned "slag of all snacks" ad and a Channel 4 cinema commercial with heavy profanity) as examples of double standards where shocking advertisements are more likely to be censored than shocking television programmes, despite the stronger content of shows like Nip/Tuck, I'm a Celebrity, Get Me Out of Here and Sex and the City.

Terry Kirby of The Independent credited Dog Breath as "the most offensive advert ever", while The Guardian's Claire Cozens called it "graphic", and Ad Age deemed it "stomach-turning". Caroline Parry of Marketing Week wrote that the advertisement proved that "a strong eye-catching advertising campaign to support a new product does not always guarantee success". An editorial in Campaign deemed it a departure for Wrigley's chewing gum, which was once "responsible for some of the blandest advertising on the box", and found it ironic that "a claimed aid to digestion should be having entirely the opposite effect." Another writer for Campaign described the advert as a "somewhat horrific, graphic interpretation of the term 'dog breath'", praising the directors for making a commercial "disgusting enough to make you want to rush out and stock up toothpaste and gum for the next decade." Dog Breath earned Happy notoriety in the advertising industry. In 2006, Farmer described the advert as "what we're known for", adding: "Now it's part of some 'BBC most controversial ads' [special]...they keep showing it over and over." The Sequoyah County Times described Dog Breath as "an example of what Happy wants to achieve – new ways of impacting people." Dog Breath received a "pencil" honour at the annual D&AD Awards in 2004.

== See also ==
- 2003 in British television
