= Adidas Stan Smith =

Tennis shoe by Adidas

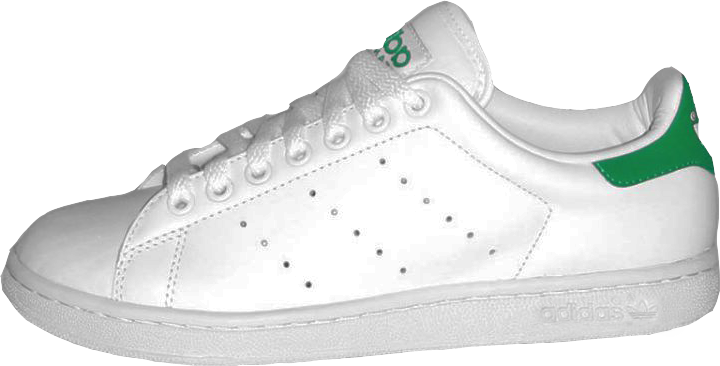
- Stan Smith II model
- Type: Sneakers
- Inventor: Horst Dassler
- Inception: 1965; 61 years ago as the "Adidas Robert Haillet"
- Manufacturer: Adidas
- Available: Yes
- Website: adidas.com/stansmith

Adidas Stan Smith is a tennis shoe made by Adidas, and first launched in 1965. Originally named "Adidas Robert Haillet" after the brand endorsed French prominent player Robert Haillet, in 1978 the sneakers were renamed after Stan Smith, an American tennis player who was active between the end of the 1960s and the beginning of the 1980s.

The shoe, usually made with a white leather upper and laces, has a simple design. Unlike most Adidas shoes, it does not have the external three stripes. Instead there are three rows of perforations (or punched ventilation holes) on both sides of each shoe's leather upper. There is sometimes a sketched picture of Stan Smith on the tongue of the shoe. In some sense, the Adidas branding is minimal on the shoe. The design and form of the shoe has basically stayed the same since it was introduced, but several new versions and colorways have appeared during the years.

== History ==
=== Origins ===
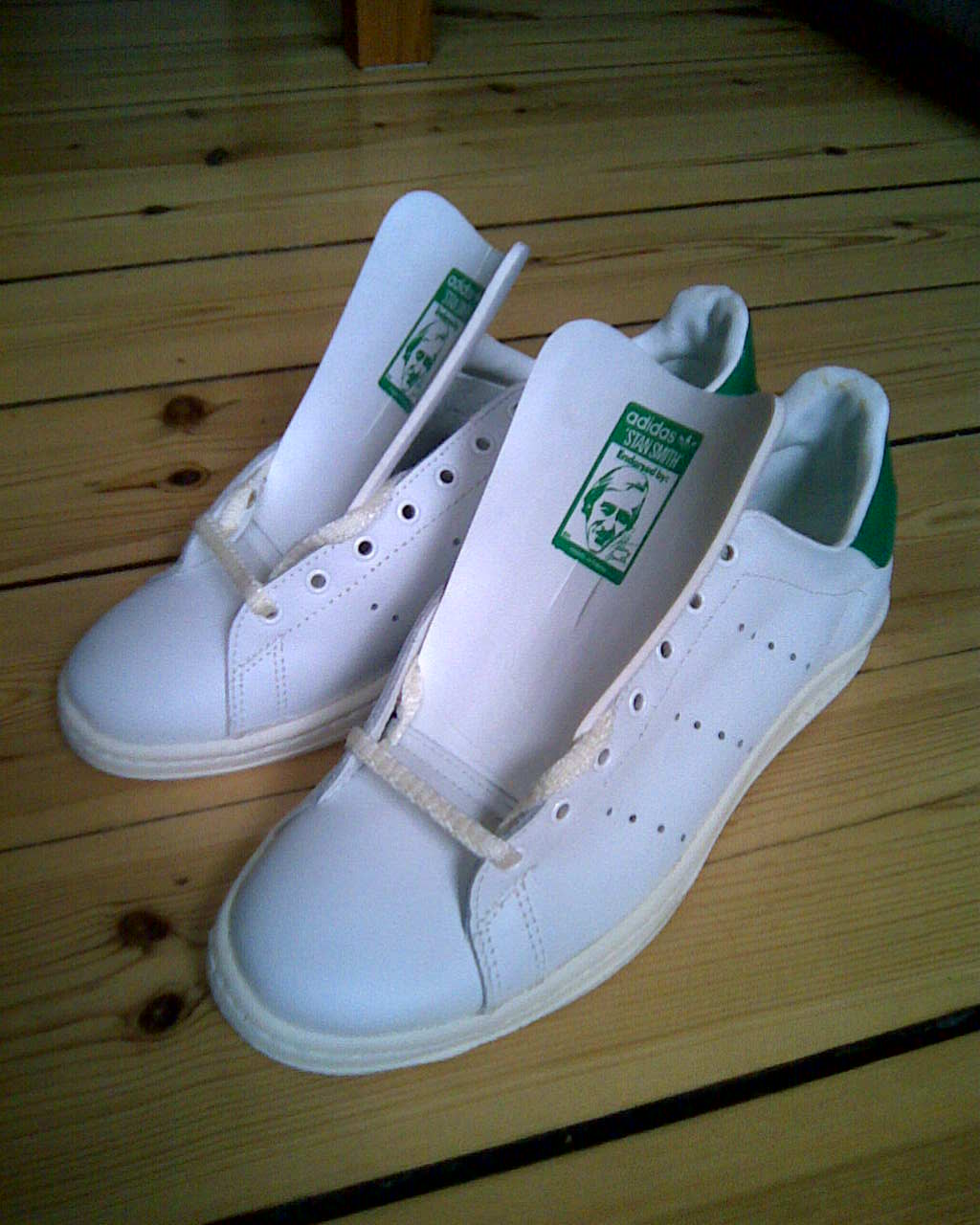
A pair of Adidas Stan Smith made in France

In 1963, the first Adidas tennis shoe was produced, which was the first ever leather tennis shoe and marked the beginning of a long line of classic Adidas shoes. The upper part of the shoe is made of white leather, whereas the pimpled outer sole is made of rubber. The inner sole is made of synthetic material. It was Horst Dassler, the son of Adolf "Adi" Dassler – the founder of Adidas, who had the idea of the first leather tennis shoe. The Adidas Stan Smith originally was manufactured in Landersheim in north-eastern France. In 1965, this tennis shoe model was named the adidas Robert Haillet after the French tennis professional Robert Haillet. When Haillet retired from tennis, Adidas and Horst Dassler decided to find another tennis player that could endorse the tennis shoe model. Donald Dell, an American tennis manager, suggested Stan Smith, who took the offer in order to obtain royalties for the use of his name. For Adidas, the shoe became a market opener in the United States. In 1967, a green foam padding was added at the back of the shoe for achilles tendon protection.

=== Stan Smith ===
In 1973, Stan Smith signed a contract with Adidas. According to Sneaker Report, this contract is on 13th place of the 50 most influential sneaker sponsorships in sports history. Adidas could not decide at first if the model should still be called Robert Haillet or if it should be renamed to Stan Smith, so for several years (1973–1978) the shoe was produced with a tongue that had Stan Smith's portrait and the word Haillet written above it. In 1978, the word "Haillet" was removed from the tongue, and the shoe was endorsed by Stan Smith and officially renamed the Adidas Stan Smith.

=== 1980s to 2000s ===
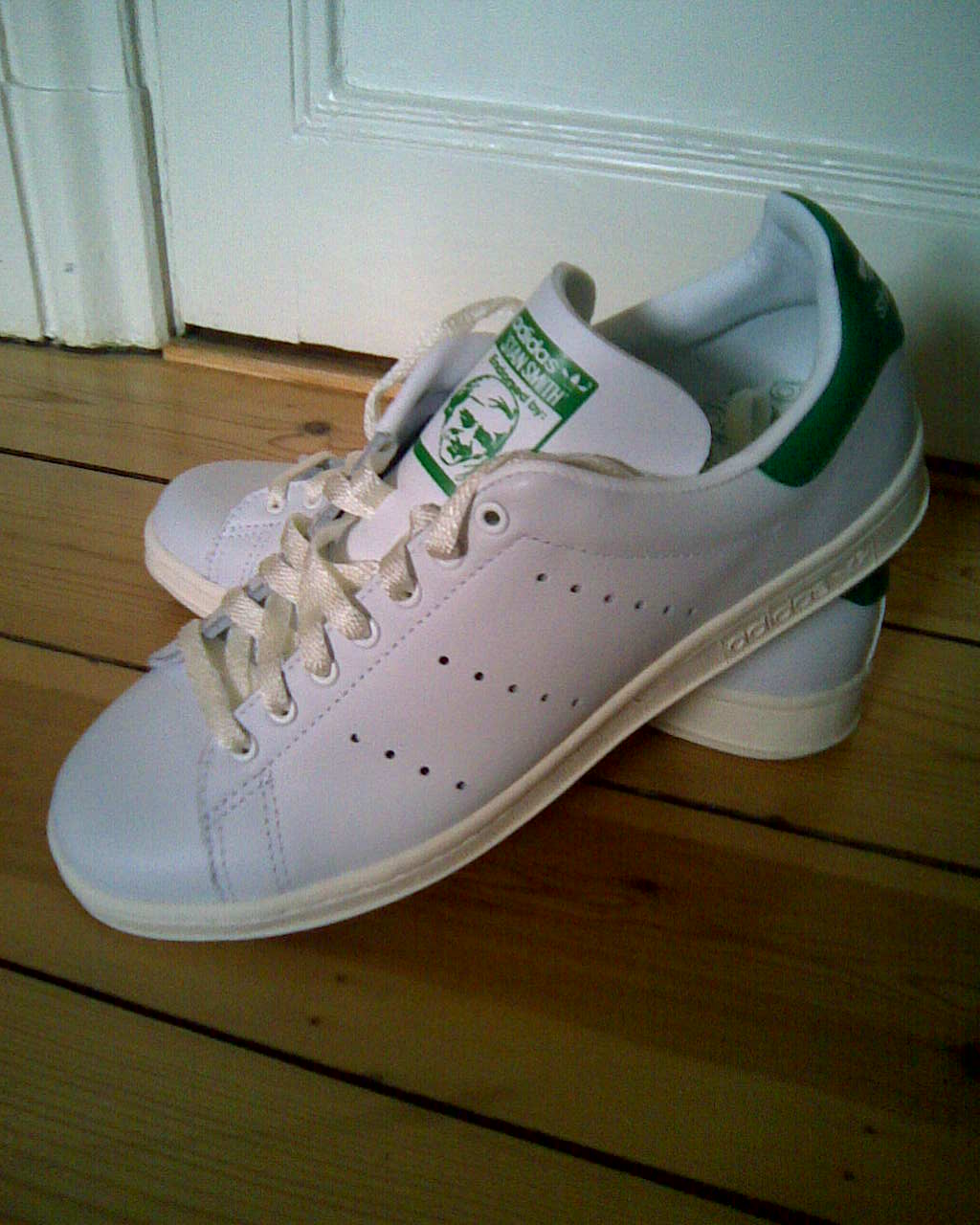
Adidas Stan Smith of the 1980s

By 1988, about 22 million pairs of adidas Stan Smith shoes had been sold, and the shoe was listed in Guinness World Records. By 1994, the number of pairs sold had increased to 23.7 million.

At the turn of the 21st century, Adidas re-issued a new version of the shoe – Adidas Stan Smith II. In 2008, a replica of the original Adidas Stan Smith was released in the Adidas Originals line and was named Adidas Stan Smith 80s. In total, the Adidas Stan Smith has sold over 30 million pairs worldwide since 1971.

During a 17 November 2009 interview that aired on The Tony Kornheiser Show, former tennis pro and sports agent Donald Dell said the original Stan Smith green-tab shoe has been in production since 1972, and generated more than US$65 million in revenue in 2008. Dell added during the same interview that the shoe is now available in eight versions, and the model is the biggest-selling tennis shoe ever.

=== 2010s ===
Complex Sneakers placed the Stan Smith at number 4 in its list of the 50 greatest tennis sneakers of all time, with the Robert Haillet model in 36th place. ShortList Magazine listed it among the 10 greatest sneakers made. Neal Heard, author of the sneaker cultural history Trainers, placed it 6th in his list of the top 10 sneakers of all time.

Despite its enormous success, Adidas briefly stopped production of the shoe in 2011. It was put back into production in 2014.

=== Timeline of the development ===
The tongue logo for the Adidas Stan Smith with Smith's portrait (without his mustache) and his signature, created and introduced in the early 1980s

- 1963–1964: Not marked as Haillet, no green foam padding, no logo on the tongue
- 1965–1966: Marked as Haillet, no green foam padding, no logo on the tongue
- 1967–1973: Marked as Haillet, green foam padding, no logo on the tongue
- 1974–1977:
1. Marked as Haillet, green foam padding, Adidas trefoil logo on the tongue
2. Marked as Haillet, green foam padding, Stan Smith's portrait and signature on the tongue
3. Marked as Haillet, shape and material of the green foam padding changed and the Adidas trefoil logo and the text Stan Smith, Stan Smith's portrait and signature on the tongue
- 1978–early 1980s: Marked as Stan Smith, green foam padding with the Adidas trefoil logo and the text Stan Smith, Stan Smith's portrait and signature on the tongue
- Early 1980s–present: Marked as Stan Smith, green foam padding with the Adidas trefoil logo and the text Stan Smith, a new logo with Stan Smith's portrait (without one of his trademarks – his moustache) and signature on the tongue. 1980s versions had long cylinders (about 10mm) in the sole: worning, it became thinner, warping here and there; newer versions have shorter cylinders (about 2mm), then worning sole become flat and breaks.

== Versions ==
There are several different versions of the Adidas Stan Smith. Most commonly, they are white with grass-green heel. but there are also other colorings. Since the mid-1990s, some versions come with velcro straps instead of laces.

=== Most common versions ===
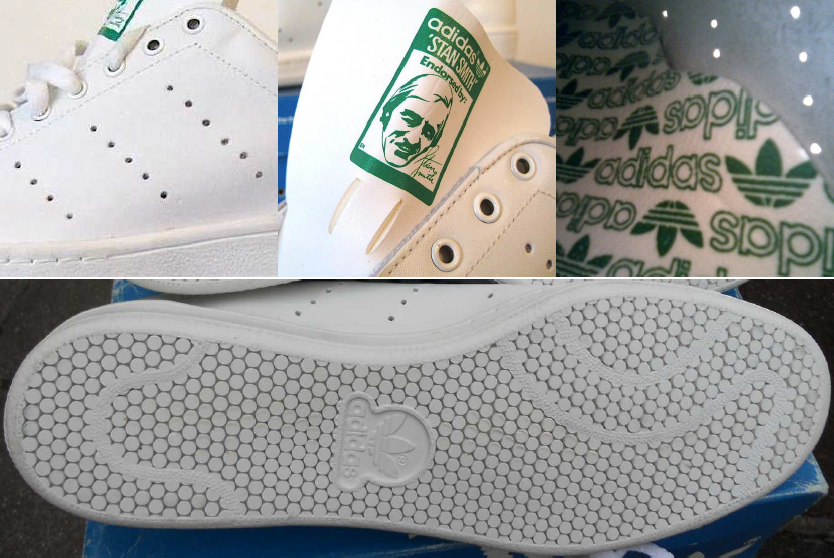
Details of the design of Adidas Stan Smith: (i) the three rows of perforations (upper-left picture), (ii) the tongue (upper-middle picture), (iii) the inner sole (upper-right picture), and (iv) the outer sole (lower picture)

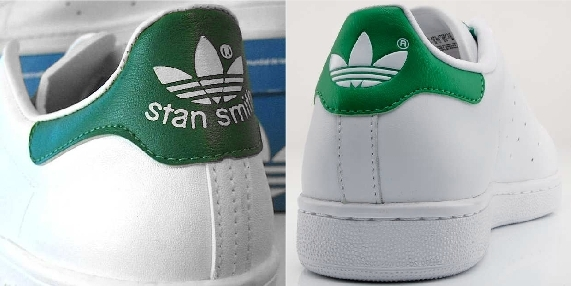
The two different green foam paddings of the Adidas Stan Smith (left picture) and the Adidas Stan Smith II (right picture), respectively

- Adidas Stan Smith: This is the classic version of the Adidas Stan Smith. This version has a thin tongue with Stan Smith's sketched portrait and his signature, the back of the shoes has a (normally grass-green) part with the Adidas trefoil logo and the text Stan Smith under the logo, and the inner sole has a printed pattern consisting of the text Adidas and the trefoil logo. In addition, the inner of the shoes is unlined. Note that the original model version numbers of the Adidas Stan Smith were FAF1028 (or just AF1028) for grass-green and AF1365 for blue, where the digit 1 indicated that it was made in France. Later numbers were 032853 and 034685.
  M20324 (white/green), M20325 (white/blue), M20326 (white/red): skin upper and lining; OrthoLite® insole.
- Adidas Stan Smith II: This version has a thick tongue without Stan Smith's portrait and signature. Instead there is a part of fabric with the text Adidas Stan Smith. At the back of the shoes there is only the Adidas trefoil logo. The inner sole is white with a single print of the word Adidas and the Adidas trefoil logo. The inner of this version is lined. Some of the model version numbers were G17079, G17076, G17077, G10778, G10780, and G10781.
- Adidas Stan Smith 80s: This version is a replica of the version Adidas Stan Smith. However, it has an oldschool or retro touch. Compared with the original version, this version (912305) has a yellowed outer sole, yellowish laces, the leather upper of the shoes is not pure white (known as neowhite), and the color of the heel parts is called fairway green. Note that this version also exists in at least two other colorings: white/navy-blue (G01976) and nubuck black with white outer soles (G01965).

=== Less common versions ===
- Adidas Stan Smith Millennium (659910, 073158): This is an updated version of the classic Adidas Stan Smith, which has the same three perforation "stripes", but has the new Adidas logo instead of the Adidas trefoil logo. In addition, the outer sole is thicker and the tongue is thick as on the Stan Smith II. It comes in white and navy blue, but the classic coloring of white and green also exists. The shoe has a lightweight design.
- Adidas Stan Smith I LG (670461, 670460, 385855): This version is the same as the original, except that the words Stan Smith are printed on the side of the leather upper.
- Adidas Stan Smith Supreme (519514, 519516, 552286, 552288)

== For tennis ==
Today, the Adidas Stan Smith is not recommended for tennis players, but the shoe continues to be a popular model in general and for old school and retro tennis shoe in particular.

== Sneaker collectors ==
For some sneaker collectors, the most sought-after vintage Adidas Stan Smith are the early versions of the shoe. The ones made in France are considered to be highly valuable.

== Sneaker art ==
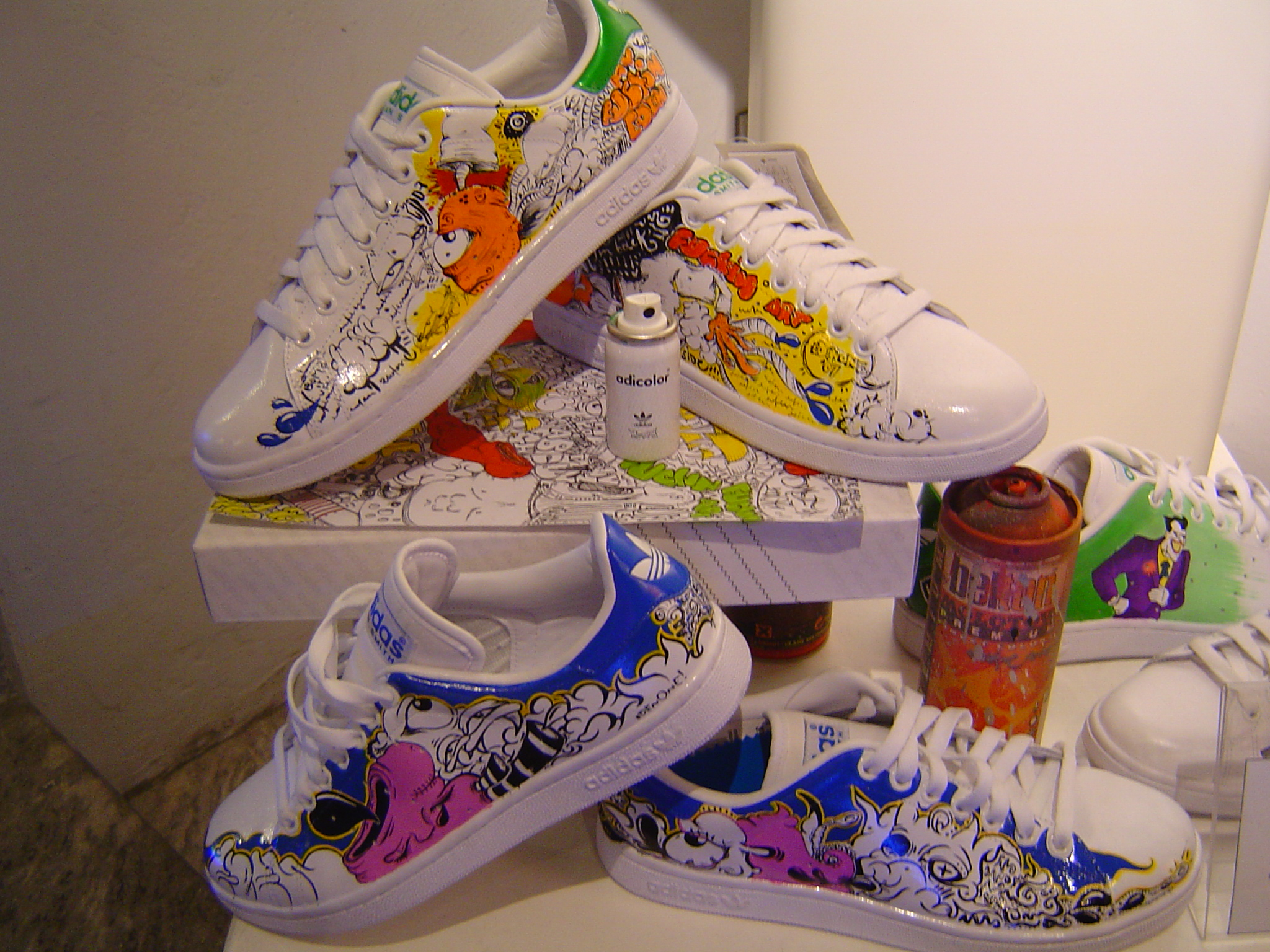
Edition "Adicolor" of Adidas Stan Smith with colors for self-painting

For some time, people have been drawing or painting on their sneakers using ink, markers or spray cans. Young people have made this kind of art with various motifs ranging from simple drawings to more complex graffiti paintings. Probably due to its often white color, the Adidas Stan Smith has been used as an object for sneaker art. For example, many artists and design studios hand-paint Stan Smith sneakers and sell them as art.

In fact, in 1983, Adidas launched the concept of Adicolor, where sneakers were sold along with the tools to customize them. The Adicolor sneakers are all white sneakers specifically created for the Adicolor concept. In 2005, Adidas re-launched Adicolor as a replica of the original from 1983. There have been some Adicolor versions of the Stan Smith. The Sport Goofy, Kermit the Frog, Miss Piggy, Mr Happy, Trimm Dich, Comfort Betty Boop, Comfort Tron, and Velcro Pack versions of the shoe also belong to the Adicolor series. Besides painting, other sneaker art has been performed with the Adidas Stan Smith. In 2008, Adidas Originals started a collaboration with American fashion designer Jeremy Scott. He has designed a couple of different versions of the Stan Smith such as JS Bowling and JS Slim Glow in the Dark.
