= Richard Farmer (director) =

Richard Farmer is a film, commercial and music video director. His directorial work has been shown in film festivals around the world, including the Saatchi & Saatchi New Directors' Showcase at Cannes Lions, and has garnered multiple MTV Video Music Awards and Best Short Film awards at both the Malibu International Film Festival and the BFI London Film Festival.

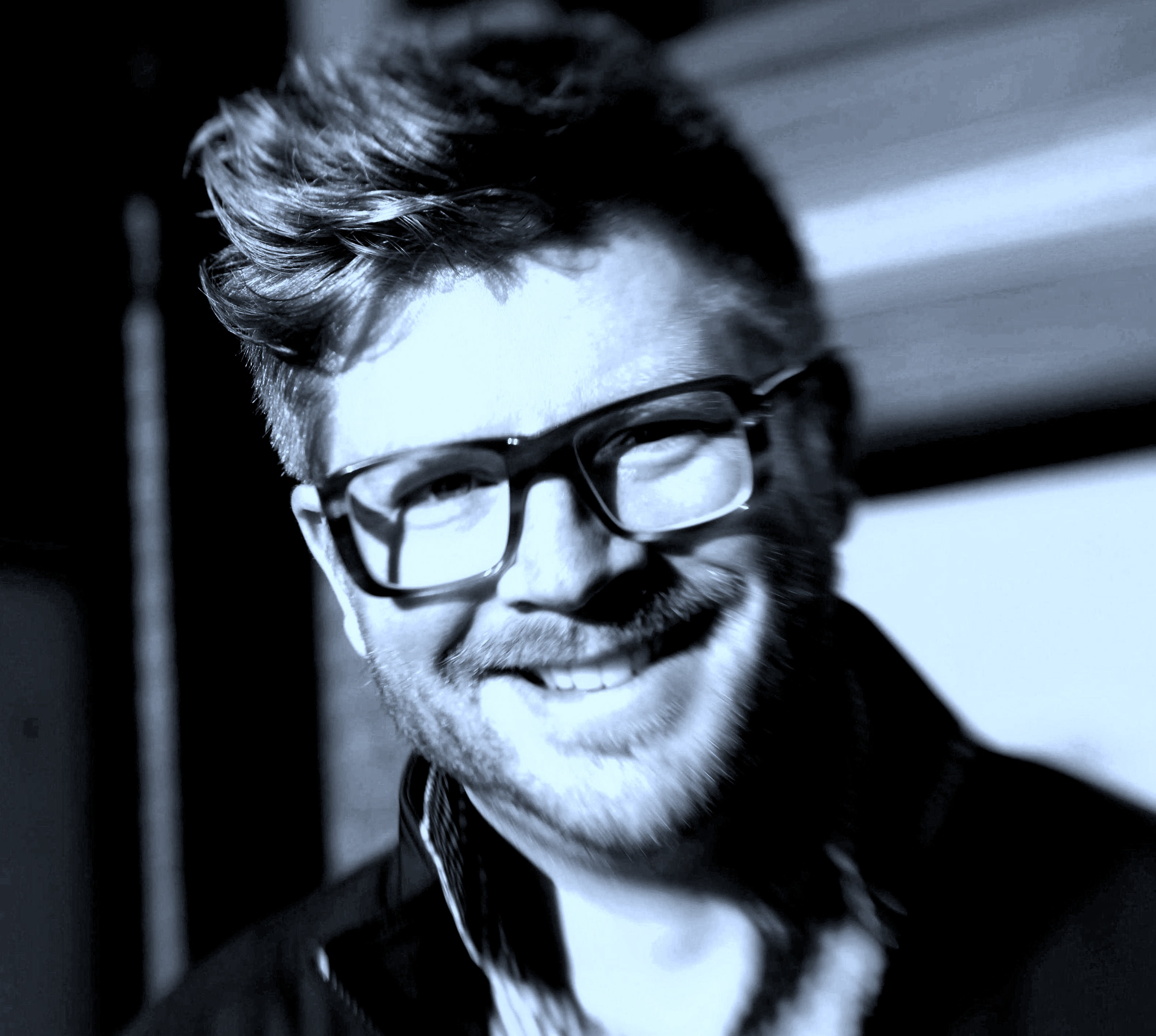
Richard Farmer

== Commercials & Music Videos ==
Richard Farmer is best known for his commercials and music videos. In 2002, Farmer started directing as half of the directing team, HAPPY alongside Guy Shelmerdine. During his time with HAPPY, Farmer directed spots for such clients as BMW's Mini Cooper, IKEA, Coca-Cola, Sprite, Virgin Mobile, PlayStation, Bacardi, Skittles, Egg, Wrigley's, Brawny, Bud Light, and Nike/Foot Locker, as well as music videos for Adam Freeland, David Gray and Gnarls Barkley.

In 2009, Farmer signed with Los Angeles-based production company, Green Dot Films, and has created commercials with Tiger Woods, Derek Jeter and Michael Strahan for Gillette and Subway, respectively. Other clients include Trivial Pursuit, Sprite, and the Fuse Network.

Farmer has recently added still photography to his repertoire. He completed a short photo-documentary and two music videos for Adam Freeland.

Farmer is currently represented by Green Dot Films and Imported Artists in Canada.

=== Awards & Controversy ===
From 2002 to 2006, HAPPY was ranked in Creativity Magazine's Top 25 Directors.

Farmer’s work with HAPPY won two categories in the 2008 MTV Video Music Awards for Best Choreography and Best Art Direction for Gnarls Barkley’s "Run", even though the video was originally banned due to the use of a controversial visual effect. The video was based upon a fictitious dance show called City Vibin' and featured Justin Timberlake performing dance moves from Farmer's favorite 90s music videos.

In 2003, their Dog Breath commercial for Wrigley's X-cite brand gum received more than 700 complaints, according to Britain's Independent Television Commission (ITC), the most the ITC had seen in its 13-year history. The commercial ended up being the most talked about commercial for the first half of 2003.

Later that same year, Happy's commercial for Gillette showing a man running from an office that is about to be demolished by a wrecking ball has been banned after 159 viewers complained that it was reminiscent of the terrorist attacks on the World Trade Center. Britain's ITC claimed the ad appeared close to the second anniversary of the 9/11.

In 2007, the British retailer, MFI, removed Happy's commercial which featured a woman noticing that the toilet seat had been left up. She shouts for her husband to come into the bathroom and when comes in she slaps him on the cheek.

== Film ==
In 2005, HAPPY's short film “Jane Lloyd” won Best Short Film at the BFI London Film Festival and Malibu International Film Festival. HAPPY's second short film, “Green,” was commissioned by Adidas for the shoe manufacturers viral web series, AdiColor, which included the work of Charlie White, Roman Coppola, Neill Blomkamp and more. Green is available as a part of the podcast series, AdiColor, from Apple's iTunes.

Farmer is currently represented by William Morris Entertainment for feature films and television.

=== Under God ===
Farmer wrote and directed his latest short film titled, “Under God," which is inspired by Joseph Campbell’s PBS series, The Power of Myth. Sparring questions of faith, technology and politics against Cold War-era social conventions, Under God is a fictional parable based upon the day that President Eisenhower met UNIVAC, the world's first super-computer.

Under God has won the following Awards:

- Silver Lei Award for Excellence in Filmmaking, 2010 Honolulu International Film Festival
- Best Sci-Fi/Horror, 2010 Dam Short Film Festival
- 1st Prize, SHORTS, 14th Annual Fade-In Awards

== Personal life ==
Farmer’s love of film and storytelling can be traced back to his childhood spent on a ranch in Oklahoma where he dreamed of becoming a filmmaker. He then honed his craft in the numerous cities he's called home, including Prague, London and Seattle. In 1998, Farmer moved to Los Angeles. He began work in the advertising business, serving as Agency producer for the agencies, Ground Zero Advertising and Mindfield. Farmer is part of the experimental electronic music group, Cassanova USA. His popular DJ sets and original music can be found on SoundCloud. Farmer is married to Kirsten Lee, an executive at Brookfield Properties and creator of Kirsten's Bazaar.
