= Fridge (advertisement) =

Advertising campaign for Guinness beer

Fridge is a 2006 television and print advertising campaign launched by Diageo to promote canned Guinness-brand stout in the United Kingdom. The campaign was handled by advertising agency Abbott Mead Vickers BBDO. The television piece was directed by J J Keith, and shot in the Czech Republic. The television ad is a thirty-second comedic spot aimed at men in their twenties and thirties, revolving around the idea of a miniature bartender who lives in a refrigerator, serving drinks to purchasers of cans of Guinness stout. The idea behind the ad was to promote the cans as being just as high quality as Guinness draught beer, which was traditionally the focus of Guinness advertising and marketing.

The ad is the sixth in the "Good things come to those who wait" campaign, following on from the hugely successful noitulovE campaign in 2005. The fish behind the bar is a nod to another previous campaign (Fish Bicycle). It was followed itself by Hands later in 2006.
