= Sea (advertisement) =

2007 advertising campaign for Smirnoff vodka

- A single frame of the Sea commercial.
- Agency: J. Walter Thompson
- Client: Diageo
- Language: Latin (music); English (text)
- Running time: 60 seconds
- Product: Smirnoff vodka
- Release dates: 30 July 2007 (online); 17 August 2007 (Cinema); 20 August 2007 (Television)
- Directed by: Daniel Kleinman
- Music by: Peter Raeburn
- Production company: Rattling Stick
- Produced by: Johnnie Frankel
- Country: United Kingdom
- Budget: £5,000,000
- Official website: http://www.smirnoff.com

Sea is an advertising campaign launched by Diageo in 2007 to promote Smirnoff brand vodka. It centres on a 60-second commercial created by J. Walter Thompson, which premiered on 17 August 2007 in showings of The Bourne Ultimatum at select cinemas across the United Kingdom. Various tie-ins were launched, including the "Smirnoff Purifier", an online game, point of sale "Smirnoff purity kits", and a tour of a custom-built "Smirnoff Purification Installation" used to make potable samples of water taken from saline or otherwise undrinkable water at selected sites. In all, the campaign cost £5,000,000 to create, making it the largest campaign ever taken on by Diageo for its Smirnoff brand.

== Commercial ==
Production of the sixty second commercial, developed by J. Walter Thompson, took place over seven months. The filming of the commercial took place over a period of several weeks in February 2007, primarily in the Coromandel Peninsula of New Zealand, with additional filming at the white cliffs of Dover and Auckland harbour. The director chosen to oversee the piece was Daniel Kleinman, known for his previous work on James Bond title sequences and adverts for Levi's and Durex.

The sequence begins with a shot of a crewman on a fishing trawler discarding a beverage can overboard, only to have the sea throw it back on board. A montage of scenes commences, showing a number of onlookers, including offshore divers, a helicopter pilot, and workers at an oil platform and a petrol station, staring in amazement as the sea disgorges vast quantities of appliances, rubble, and wrecks ranging from coins to Spitfires, Lancaster bombers, a Scandinavian longship and a simulacrum of the Colossus of Rhodes, accompanied by a Latinate chant composed by Peter Raeburn & Nick Foster of Soundtree Music. The advert closes with the straplines "Ten Times Filtered", "Triple Distilled" and "Clearly Smirnoff" appearing over a tracking shot across the now pristine ocean floor, to a bottle of Smirnoff vodka.

The VFX and other post-production work were handled by Framestore CFC, and were created using a variety of programs, including Houdini and Flame. Since at the time of filming, the sea around Auckland harbour used in the shots of the North Sea oil rig was unsuitably quiescent, the group made use of techniques developed for their earlier work on Superman Returns to produce the stormy seas that appear in the final cut.

The piece was first aired in select cinemas prior to screenings of The Bourne Ultimatum from 17 August 2007. This was followed three days later by appearances on national British television.

An extended version of Peter Raeburn's soundtrack to the ad, named 'Celebrare', was commercially released on 14 July 2008, accompanied by remixes by UK DJs Layo and Bushwacka!.

== Other media ==
=== Online ===
AKQA London were brought on by the creators to design the online elements of the campaign which would appear as teasers prior to the screening of the commercial. Keeping in line with the central themes of the sea and of purification, AKQA constructed the "Smirnoff Purifier". The Purifier was a hydraulic cannon attached to a platform off the southern coast of England. The cannon was used to launch a number of objects including refrigerators, washing machines, and caravans back ashore. The footage taken of the launches was then integrated into an online game on the Smirnoff website, where users would choose how much pressure to fire the objects with. Those who successfully landed all of the pieces onto a target on the beach could enter a prize draw to win a year's supply of Smirnoff vodka.

=== Tour ===
Coinciding with the first appearances of the commercial on television, Smirnoff began a national tour of the "Smirnoff Purification Installation", a custom-built apparatus that would purify samples of water for members of the public who approached the operators. The installation was first tested publicly using water on the (River Thames), in London, followed by the Water of Leith in Edinburgh in 2005. The installation then went to the Philippines in 2006, to purify water from the Marikina River. Sites in the United Kingdom visited by the installation this year to coincide with the commercial include Blackpool (Irish Sea), Portsmouth, Bristol and Newquay (Atlantic Ocean).

When water is placed into the plant, it passes through a series of sediment filters, is chlorinated, and then re-filtered. It then travels through a reverse osmosis system, is subjected to ultraviolet light, and is tested on-site by approved laboratory staff to ensure its potability. Finally, the water is run through activated charcoal in the same manner as Smirnoff vodka before being presented to the public for consumption.

=== Sale kits ===
As a tie-in to the £5m campaign, Smirnoff spent a further £500,000 on a set of point of sale kits focusing on promoting the "purity" of Smirnoff vodka and presenting a number of serving suggestions. The kit includes a training CD with demonstrations of Smirnoff serves, as well as branded ice buckets, bar runners, posters and drip mats.
