= NoitulovE =

2005 TV advertisement for Guinness beer

noitulovE
- A frame from noitulovE
- Agency: Abbott Mead Vickers BBDO
- Client: Diageo
- Language: English
- Running time: 60 seconds
- Product: Guinness Draught stout
- Release date: 3 October 2005 (Television)
- Directed by: Daniel Kleinman
- Music by: Peter Raeburn (arrangement); Cy Coleman & Dorothy Fields (original song); Sammy Davis Jr. (performance)
- Production company: Kleinman Productions
- Produced by: Johnnie Frankel
- Country: United Kingdom
- Budget: £1.3 million (advert) £15 million (campaign)
- Preceded by: Mustang
- Followed by: Fridge
- Official website: http://www.guinness.com/

noitulovE ("Evolution" backwards) is a British television and cinema advertisement launched by Diageo in 2005 to promote Guinness Draught stout. The 60-second piece formed the cornerstone of a £15 million advertising campaign targeting men in their late twenties and early thirties. The commercial shows, in reverse, the adventures of three characters who evolve from mudskippers to present day humans before tasting Guinness in a London pub. The commercial was handled by the advertising agency Abbott Mead Vickers BBDO, with a budget of £1.3M. It was directed by Daniel Kleinman. Production was contracted to Kleinman Productions, with post-production by Framestore CFC. It premiered on British television on 3 October 2005.

noitulovE is the fifth television/cinema piece in the Good things come to those who wait series, and its premiere marked the end of a four-year hiatus. The advert and its associated campaign were a critical and financial success. It received over 30 awards from professional organisations in the advertising and television industries, and was the most-awarded commercial worldwide in 2006. The impact of the campaign was such that during a period in which the UK beer market experienced a substantial decline in revenue, Guinness reported that its year-on-year earnings within the region had noticeably increased. At the same time, Guinness achieved its highest-ever volume and value shares and became the market leader within the region. This was attributed in no small part to the positive reception of noitulovE.

== Sequence ==
Three patrons take their first sip of Guinness in a London pub. "The Rhythm of Life" as performed by Sammy Davis Jr. in the 1969 film version of the musical Sweet Charity begins to play as a reverse-motion sequence begins. The three men appear to retreat from the bar and into the street, other patrons disappearing as they pass. As they move down the street, a reverse time-lapse sequence transforms their clothes to match a rapidly changing urban scene, which progresses through modern-day London to the Edwardian period. Street features such as electric lights transform into gas lamps and buildings begin to disappear frame by frame. A short cutaway sequence shows the city regressing into the past, shrinking to a small Anglo-Saxon settlement, before disappearing entirely. Returning to the main sequence, the three men's clothes and hairstyles change into Bronze Age equivalents as they pass through thickening woodland. A close-up of one of the characters shows his features have transformed into those of a Neanderthal. The three men are then frozen in an ice age glacier.

They re-emerge from the glacier as primitive hominids, their clothes ripped away to reveal loincloths. They continue to walk backwards with a more simian gait, and soon turn into chimpanzees. From there, they are transformed into a number of different species in quick succession, including flying squirrels, furry mammals, aquatic mammals, fish, flightless birds, small dinosaurs, and burrowing lizard creatures. The environment around them changes rapidly as they travel. Finally, the three become mudskippers around a murky puddle. The action briefly moves forward again to show the middle character expressing his disgust at the taste of the water. The sequence ends with a transition to a product shot of three pints of Guinness, accompanied by the strapline "Good things come to those who wait."

== Production ==
=== Background ===
Fifteen new CGI characters were created during post-production for the commercial.

Abbott Mead Vickers BBDO won the account for Guinness in 1996 with a campaign built on their new strapline "Good things come to those who wait". They produced several commercials using variations on the theme, including Swimblack, Bet on Black, and the critically acclaimed Surfer, voted the "Best Advert of All Time" by the British public in 2002. After the 2001 Dreamer advertisements, Diageo, the corporate owners of Guinness, decided to pursue a more pan-European marketing strategy. The strapline proved difficult to translate, and was abandoned. Several new straplines were tried out over the next three years, including "Believe" (Free and Tom Crean) and "A story of darkness and light" (Moth and Mustang).

The new marketing strategy did not prove particularly successful, and in 2004 Diageo returned to regional advertising. AMV BBDO were presented with the choice of coming up with either a new theme to appeal to the 18–35 British male demographic or a new angle on the tried and tested Good things... concept. A number of ideas were put forward, including "The Longest Wait". From this concept, noitulovE was quickly plotted out: the advert would show three individuals waiting 500,000,000 years before finally taking their first sip of Guinness, the timeline compressed into a 50-second clip. The decision to run the "Evolution sequence" in reverse was taken fairly early, as it was felt that it would better hold viewers' interest during a 60-second television spot.

=== Pre-production ===
The project had not yet been greenlit when the agency approached Daniel Kleinman, known for his work on James Bond title sequences, with the intention of taking him on as a director. After looking over the concept pitch and a rough draft of the script, Kleinman's immediate impressions were that the idea was "fresh", "an opportunity to try out some new techniques", and that it would "put Guinness back on track, doing a big 'wow' idea".

Kleinman contacted a pair of Canadian graphic novel artists to begin the storyboarding process. Storyboarding the commercial meant that the agency could determine how much of the £1.3M budget to allocate to each section, and provided them with visuals to use as part of the presentation to Diageo when pitching the various concepts for a decision on which to pursue. The effort paid off and approval was given to move ahead with production.

=== Production ===
Production of the commercial took place over two months, with principal photography shot in Iceland. Time-lapse photographs were taken of the country's mudpots, volcanic terrain and frozen lakes using 35 mm film cameras. The shooting was done in the early summer for the nearly continuous daylight that the season afforded them. The next pieces of the commercial to be assembled were the live-action segments, shot in a greenscreen studio in London. Filming was done in three stages, with the three actors changing into different sets of prosthetic makeup at each stage. For the final section the actors spent a week practising the choreography behind walking backwards with an appropriately simian gait. Wires were attached to the back of each actor, allowing them to lean forwards to give the impression that they were being "sucked back in time" when the final cut was put together. While filming the actor sequences, VFX supervisor William Bartlett filmed the aerial view of London from Tower 42's Vertigo bar.

With computer-generated imagery looking to make up so much of the commercial, Kleinman attempted to use film of real elements wherever possible. To this end, 200 mudskippers were brought to the studio from South Africa for the final scene, arriving via Singapore. An entire afternoon was set aside for filming the mudskipper sequence. The footage obtained formed the major part of the final cut of the scene, with only one or two post-production changes: the addition of tail fins and animation of the expression of disgust that closes the piece. Stop motion footage of other real elements was taken, including a stage-by-stage blowtorching of plants, used to show flora coming back to life in the reverse sequence, and shots of baking bread, used to model the geological changes to background rock formations. Additional real elements were to have been incorporated into the commercial, mostly from stock footage of several animal species, but only short segments of apes and lizards appeared in the final cut.

=== Post-production ===
Post-production work was handled mostly by Framestore CFC, who had worked on previous Guinness campaigns Surfer and Dreamer, and had worked with Daniel Kleinman on a number of outside projects, including several commercials and James Bond title sequences. The project was overseen by William Bartlett, known for his visual effects work on the BBC television documentary Walking with Dinosaurs. The original schedule allowed for three and a half months in post-production, with airing of the commercial to follow almost immediately.

The 24-man animation team was split into two groups. Half were assigned to the creation of the 15 new CGI creatures populating noitulovE (in Maya), while the other half created the backgrounds (in Houdini). Compositing work – combining the greenscreen shots with stock footage and CGI elements – was performed in Flame and Inferno. As the final commercial was to be shown on cinema screens, the animators worked at a resolution higher than that afforded by the 576i definition used by British PAL-encoded television sets, to improve the appearance of the advert when projected.

Near the end of post-production, the creative team decided that the music chosen to accompany the advert, an electronic track by Groove Armada, was not working particularly well. Peter Raeburn, who had chosen the track used in Surfer (Leftfield's "Phat Planet"), was brought on as music director. Raeburn suggested three pieces, with "Rhythm of Life" ultimately presented to Guinness as an alternative and approved as a replacement.

== Release and reception ==
=== Schedule ===
noitulovE was originally to have begun its run in September 2005, but the airdate was pushed back several weeks as post-production took longer than anticipated. As had been the case with several earlier campaigns, the commercial was to air in several bursts, throughout 2005 and 2006. Spots were purchased in the commercial breaks of sports broadcasts, high-budget television dramas and shows whose primary audience overlapped with the campaign's target demographic of British males in the 24–35 age range. The first burst was commissioned to run from 3 October to 13 November 2005, during programming such as the UEFA Champions League, Lost, Vincent, Ant and Dec's Saturday Night Takeaway and terrestrial television screenings of Austin Powers: Goldmember.

The second burst lasted through December. The focus moved to multichannel television, with appearances in live televised football matches, films, and popular programming such as I'm a Celebrity, Get Me Out of Here!. Two further bursts were commissioned for 2006, to run from 15 May to 9 June and 22 August to 8 October. Programmes selected for the May–June burst included Celebrity X Factor, Big Brother and live football and cricket matches. The final series of spots ran during programming totalling 56 ratings points per week (56% of British television viewers), with much of the budget assigned to multichannel television.

=== Awards ===
List of awards

Art Directors Club Awards
- Silver – Special Effects
- Distinctive Merit – Cinema-Over 30 Seconds
- Distinctive Merit – TV-Over 30 Seconds
- Distinctive Merit – Editing
- Distinctive Merit – Art Direction
- Distinctive Merit – Music & Sound Design
Australian Effects and Animation Festival
- Winner – Best Commercial
British Television Advertising Awards
- Gold – Alcoholic Drinks
- Silver – Best Over 60 Seconds
- Silver – Commercials Shown in Cinema and on TV
BTAA Craft Awards
- Winner – Best Crafted Commercial of the Year
- Winner – Best Direction (Daniel Kleinman)
- Finalist – Best Computer Animation
- Finalist – Best Use of Recorded Music
- Finalist – Best Video Post Production
Cannes Lions International Advertising Festival
- Winner – Grand Prix (Film)
Clio Awards
- Gold – TV/Beverages Alcoholic
- Gold – TV/Direction
- Silver – Visual Effects
Cresta Awards
- Winner- Grand Prix (Television)
D&AD Global Awards
- Yellow Pencil for Special Effects in the TV and Cinema Crafts
Epica Awards
- Winner – Epica D'Or (films)
Eurobest Awards
- Gold – Alcoholic Drinks
Golden Award of Montreux
- Winner – Gold Award (Best in show)
- Gold – Beverages (Alcoholic)
- Gold – Humour
Gunn Report
- Winner – Most Awarded Commercial in the World
IAPI Shark Advertising Awards
- Gold – Alcoholic Drinks: Beer
- Gold – Best Post Production/Special Effects
Imagina Awards
- Winner – Special Jury Prize
International ANDY Awards
- Winner – Best in Show (GRANDY)
International Food And Beverage Creative Awards
- Winner – Alcoholic Drinks (Television)
- Winner – Television (Overall)
London International Awards
- Winner – Beverages – Alcoholic (Television/Cinema)
- Winner – Special Effects (Television/Cinema)
- Winner (Disqualified) – Original Music with Lyrics
- Finalist – Animation, Computer
- Finalist – Editing
- Finalist – Humour
Midsummer Awards
- Gold – Alcoholic Drinks
- Gold – Best Animation
- Gold – Best Post Production
- Silver – Best Use of Music
The One Show Awards
- Gold – Consumer Television
4th Visual Effects Society Awards
- Winner – Outstanding Visual Effects in a Commercial

noitulovE was well received by critics within the advertising and television industries, and was predicted to win the 2006 Cannes Lions Film Grand Prix, one of the advertising industry's highest awards. Advertising Age said of the piece: "A flawless DGI production to an irresistible piece of music propelling a brilliant, astonishingly witty new iteration of a longstanding, unique positioning. This isn't just great advertising; it is perfect advertising." Gastón Bigio, Executive Creative Director for Del Campo Nazca Saatchi & Saatchi remarked on the campaign in the run-up to the festival, saying "noitulovE is, in my opinion, the best. [...] This execution is absolutely incredible, as is the production." The main competition for the prize was thought to be the Australian Big Ad for Carlton draught beer, and the British Balls, for Sony's BRAVIA line of high-definition television sets. After the three received Gold Lions in the Film category, they were shortlisted by the judges as contenders for the Grand Prix. Ultimately, the honour went to noitulovE. After the decision, David Droga, president of the jury which determined the outcome, said "It's a very very strong ad. A lot of the jurors felt that it was not only a stand-alone, remarkable ad, but also a triumphant return for a fabulous campaign." The victory placed director Daniel Kleinman at Number 29 in The Independent's list of the Top 50 Newsmakers of 2006.

The 2006 edition of the Gunn Report, an authoritative annual publication determining the advertising industry's most critically successful campaigns, revealed that noitulovE had received more awards that year than any other campaign worldwide. Among the awards were three Clios, two Golden Sharks, and the Special Jury Prize at the Imagina Awards.

The ad was also a hit with the public. It has been credited by Guinness as being responsible for the substantial boost in sales experienced by the brand during the period in which it was broadcast. While revenues within the UK beer market declined by an average of −0.4% (−£19M), the year-on-year figures for Guinness showed an increase of 3.6% (+£13.3M). Between October 2005 and October 2006, Guinness achieved its highest ever volume (6.8%) and value (7.4%) shares, taking the position of market leader from Stella Artois. Diageo attributed the growth in no small part to the positive reception garnered by noitulovE.

=== Legacy ===
As one of the most recognisable British television advertisements of 2006, noitulovE was one of two commercials (the other being Sony's Balls) to feature in a £200M campaign launched by Digital UK to raise awareness of the imminent switchover within the UK from analogue to digital television. New versions of the two adverts were produced, showing the first few seconds of the original spot before being interrupted by "Digit Al", an animated spokesman for the campaign.

In 2004, Guinness launched a retrospective television advertising campaign promoting Guinness Extra Cold stout, featuring new ten-second versions of commercials broadcast between 1984 and 2004. These included Mars (with Rutger Hauer reprising his role as the "Pure Genius"), Anticipation, Fish Bicycle, Surfer, and Bet on Black. noitulovE joined the campaign in 2006, and was the only piece to receive more than one new version. In the first of these, the patrons are encased only seconds after taking their first sip of Guinness in a glacier identical to the one which appeared halfway through the original spot. In the second, the sea through which the three fish bound backwards in the original spot is frozen while the trio are in mid-leap, leaving the characters skidding across the surface. In the final version, the primeval pool at the end of the original spot freezes while the mudskippers are taking their drink, and the protagonists' tongues are left stuck in the ice.

When noitulovE was first proposed, it was the only pitch revisiting the Good things come to those who wait campaign, as, according to copywriter Ian Heartfield, both AMV BBDO and Diageo "didn't think [they] could do something good enough to warrant following on from Surfer and the like." However, following the success of noitulovE, three additional commercials have been aired within the Good Things... campaign: Fridge, Hands, and Tipping Point (Guinness' most expensive advertising campaign to date).

Preceded by Grrr	Cannes Lions Film Grand Prix Winner; 2006	Succeeded by Evolution
