= Daniel Kleinman =

English director (born 1955)

- Born: 23 December 1955 (age 70)
- Years active: 1984—present

Daniel Kleinman (born 23 December 1955) is a British television commercial and music video director who has designed every title sequence for the James Bond series of films since GoldenEye (1995), with the exception of Quantum of Solace (2008) (which was designed by the filmmaking and design collective MK12). He returned to design the titles for Skyfall (2012), Spectre (2015), and No Time to Die (2021).

== Early life ==
He attended Orange Hill Grammar School in north-west London, which became Mill Hill County High School.

== Career ==
Kleinman formed Bazooka Joe, a rock band, with John Ellis and friends from Orange Hill Grammar School, Burnt Oak, London. The band played extensively throughout the 1970s. In 1975 it was supported by the Sex Pistols, playing for the first time at St Martin's School of Art, London. Bazooka Joe had a varied changing line up of musicians, notably Adam Ant and Arabella Weir, Mark Tanner (Sculptor), Chris Duffy (photographer).

Prior to Bond films, Kleinman directed music videos for musicians such as Madonna, Fleetwood Mac, Paula Abdul, Simple Minds, Wang Chung, Adam Ant and many others. Between 1984 and 1987, Kleinman's work received a record five nominations for the MTV Video Music Award for Most Experimental Video, as well as three nominations for Best Direction and several other categories. His 1989 James Bond-inspired video for Gladys Knight's title song to Licence to Kill led to him being chosen as the replacement when regular Bond title designer Maurice Binder died in 1991. In addition to the titles, Kleinman also directed the music videos for Sheryl Crow's Tomorrow Never Dies title song and Billie Eilish's No Time to Die title song.

Kleinman has directed many television commercials for companies ranging from Smirnoff's Sea and Guinness' noitulovE, to pieces for Levi's, Johnnie Walker, Microsoft (for which he directed the infamous Champagne spot for the Xbox), Durex and Audi. He also directed the iconic Boddington's commercials featuring Melanie Sykes.

Kleinman also directed Harry Enfield and Paul Whitehouse in Smashie and Nicey, End of an Era.

== James Bond ==
Kleinman's appointment as title designer for the James Bond films placed greater emphasis on the use of modern technologies (such as computer-generated images) into the creation of the series' title sequences, as well as an emphasis on the integration of elements of each film's respective plots within the musical sequences.

- The titles for GoldenEye (1995) feature a two-faced woman, an allusion to the god Janus, the namesake of a character and his terrorist organisation in the film. The sequence also includes imagery of scantily-clad women tearing down Soviet monuments, physically destroying Communist iconography, which bridges the gap between the cold open pre-credits sequence, set during the Cold War and the remainder of the film, set after the fall of the Soviet Union, and which has a scene in a Russian dumping ground full of damaged statues of Vladimir Lenin and Joseph Stalin.
- For the Tomorrow Never Dies (1997) title sequence, Kleinman turned the Bond women into anthropomorphic symbols of circuitry and communications to illustrate the plot's concerns with the power of the mass media. Satellites in orbit become diamonds, alluding visually to original title designer for the series Maurice Binder's sequence for Diamonds Are Forever (1971).
- The titles for The World Is Not Enough (1999) feature images of the globe, pumping oil derricks, and silhouettes of women forming from the rainbow effect of oil on water, reflecting the storyline's central theme of the exploitation of the natural resource.
- Die Another Day (2002)'s titles illustrate Bond being tortured during imprisonment in North Korea with beatings, water dunkings, and scorpion stings. Klein an represents the scantily clad women negatively as "elementals" – water, electricity, and extremes of hot and cold, all employed in the torture. The technique of integrating plot elements to advance the story had last been employed in the series in 1962, for the titles of Dr. No.
- At the request of director Martin Campbell, Kleinman omitted the women from the titles of Casino Royale (2006), replacing them with angular rotoscoped silhouettes of Bond and a series of attackers, whom he dispatches as he works his way to Double-0 status, again advancing the plot. It was the first time that women had been absent from a Bond title sequence since Dr. No. The sequence is set against a stylised background of casino elements of roulette wheels and playing cards, reflecting the central theme and the poker game scenes in the film. The film's Bond girl, Vesper Lynd, appears as the Queen of Hearts on a playing card. The sequence concludes with a focus on Bond (played by Daniel Craig)'s ice-cold blue eyes.
- After being absent for 2008 series entry Quantum of Solace, in 2012 Kleinman designed the titles for Skyfall. Bond's eyes are emphasised again, and a sniper wound in Bond's chest which was inflicted in the pre-credits sequence is shown. Bond moves through multiple surreal environments, including a graveyard, a hall of mirrors, a riverbed, and Skyfall itself, the Bond family estate. Also appearing are Chinese lanterns, representing the portions of the film in Shanghai and Macau, target circles from an indoor shooting range with Bond's face, and the film's principal villain, Silva, with his calling card, a red skull. The scantily-clad silhouetted women also appear again. The final portion alludes to the film's title, with pistols, swords, and daggers falling from the sky onto an apocalyptic rendition of the graveyard, before the sequence again concludes with a close zoom on Bond's eyes.
- The title sequence for Spectre (2015) emphasises the octopus of the SPECTRE logo, with tentacles appearing in nearly every scene in the sequence to symbolise the organisation's control of Bond's life. Previous Bond villains and friends appear, including Raoul Silva from Skyfall, Le Chiffre from Casino Royale, Vesper Lynd, and M as played by Judi Dench, all reflected on shattered glass.
- For Craig's final Bond film, No Time to Die (2021), Kleinman opened the sequence with an homage to Maurice Binder by referencing the coloured dots which appeared during the credit sequence of Dr. No. The key themes of the sequence "are betrayal, and time," utilising images of clocks and hourglasses, which represent all the time in the world; but when they are broken so is Bond's heart for thinking, wrongly, that Madeleine Swann has betrayed him. Images of Vesper Lynd are included alongside Madeleine, in order to tie her in with Vesper in the audience's mind as both deceiving Bond. Images of Bond's Aston Martin DB5 sinking into an abyss and a statue of Britannia crumbling and dropping her shield are used to represent Bond's retirement. DNA strands made up of Walther PPKs are also seen to reflect the movie's plot involving DNA-coded nanobots. The start of the sequence contains "muted colors and natural tones" to reflect Bond's broken heart, before becoming brighter and uplifting towards the end "which symbolizes him getting his mojo back."
