= Mustang (advertisement) =

Advertising campaign for Guinness beer

- Agency: Abbott Mead Vickers BBDO
- Client: Diageo
- Language: English
- Running time: 60 seconds
- Product: Guinness draught stout
- Release date: 2004
- Directed by: Anthony Minghella
- Music by: "Mustang" - Craig Armstrong
- Production company: Paul Weiland Film Company
- Produced by: Carol Powell
- Country: United Kingdom
- Budget: £15m
- Preceded by: Moth
- Followed by: noitulovE
- Official website: http://www.guinness.com/

Mustang is a 2004 television and cinema advertising campaign promoting Guinness-brand draught stout. It was produced by advertising agency Abbott Mead Vickers BBDO, and aired in Europe, North America, and parts of Asia. The ad was filmed in the United States, and was directed by the Academy Award-winning British film director Anthony Minghella, famous for his work on The English Patient.

The sequence revolves around a man sent to a prison camp in the Midwestern United States, where he is instructed to train wild mustangs. A prisoner stares down one of the mustangs before opening the gate to release him. The prisoner is charged with retrieving the horse, and the piece ends with the man riding the horse across the plains, over the strapline "a story of darkness and light".

Mustang was the last Guinness advertisement to use the strapline, following the earlier Moth. After Mustang, Abbott Mead Vickers chose to return to its established "Good things come to those who wait" campaign, the next piece of which (noitulovE) aired in 2005.
