= Raw Tea =

Raw Tea was a line of alcoholic malt beverages under Diageo's Smirnoff brand, available from 2006 to 2009 and sold mostly on the US market. It contains tea, and originally came in Lemon, Peach, Raspberry and Green Tea flavors. The drink was discontinued sometime in 2009.

== "Tea Partay" ==
The release of Raw Tea line was backed up by a viral advertising campaign, based around an online music video titled "Tea Partay" (available on major video hosting sites beginning in August 2006). The ending of the video promoted the TeaPartay.com website, which initially contained little beyond the video itself. The video humorously features actors and dancers appearing as wealthy preppy young adults singing rap music, ostensibly performed by a band named Prep-Unit (P-Unit). The song contains references to the WASP lifestyle. The video was popular on the Internet, garnering more than 5.8 million hits by June 2011 on YouTube alone, virtually all of them in the United States where the product is sold. A sequel was created to promote Smirnoff's new Raw Green Tea. This new Tea Rap, known as Green Tea Partay, features a West Side Beverly Hills rap group known as the Boyz N The Hillz featuring white nouveau riche stereotypes rather than their East Side old money counterparts.
