= Good things come to those who wait (Guinness) =

Advertising slogan for Guinness beer

The closing shot of the noitulovE spot, featuring the campaign's slogan over a product shot of three pints of Guinness stout

"Good things come to those who wait" is an advertising slogan used by Diageo in television, cinema, and print advertising campaigns promoting Guinness-brand draught stout in the United Kingdom. The slogan formed the cornerstone of advertising agency Abbott Mead Vickers BBDO's successful pitch to secure the Guinness account in 1996. Their proposal was to turn around the negative consumer opinion of the length of time required to correctly pour a pint of Guinness from the tap, usually quoted as 119.5 seconds, as well as to encourage bartenders to take the time to do so. A similar idea had been incorporated into a number of Guinness campaigns in the past, such as the Irish "Guinness Time" television and cinema spots of the early 1990s.

The first piece of the "Good Things..." campaign to be launched was the sixty-second Swimblack television and cinema commercial, in which an aging local sports hero annually swims in a race from an offshore buoy to his brother's seafront pub against the "clock" of pint of Guinness being correctly poured at the bar. The advertisement, which premiered on 16 May 1998, was successful at boosting sales, particularly among the older male demographic. The other major success of the campaign during its original four-year run was the critically acclaimed Surfer commercial released in 1999; a more serious black-and-white piece for television and cinema inspired by Walter Crane's 1892 painting Neptune's Horses. Surfer went on to be voted the "Best Ad of All Time" in a poll conducted by The Sunday Times and Channel 4 in 2002. After several other variations on the theme, including Bet on Black and Dreamer, the campaign was put on the backburner. The primary motivation behind this was Diageo's decision to forgo regional advertising in the United Kingdom and Ireland in favour of pan-European campaigns, in the same manner as Guinness campaigns in North America and the African Michael Power series. The "Good Things..." slogan proved difficult to translate, and so a decision was made to pursue other campaign ideas. Two of the more successful slogans tried out between 2000 and 2005 were "Believe" (Tom Crean, Free In, Volcano Rescue) and "A story of light and dark" (Moth, Mustang).

In 2005 Diageo made the decision to return to regional marketing campaigns. As such, Abbot Mead Vickers BBDO were presented with the choice of either coming up with a new slogan, or attempting to find a fresh take on "Good Things...". Feeling that none of the replacements that had been tried out in the intervening years had matched the appeal of Good Things..., the agency decided to attempt to find a new angle on their old concept. Several ideas were proposed, and the one believed to show the most promise was that of "The Longest Wait". After a basic script had been put together, the agency brought director Daniel Kleinman on board. The result was commercial noitulovE, which followed three Guinness patrons travelling backwards through time, "de-evolving" into a number of species along the way. The piece was a huge success both critically and financially: it received more awards than any other commercial in the world in 2006, and was credited with pushing Guinness into the position of market leader in the United Kingdom beer market.

Spurred on by this success, AMV BBDO produced several more "Good Things..." print and television commercials in 2006 and 2007, such as Hands and Fridge. The most recent item in the campaign is Tipping Point, Guinness' most expensive commercial to date, which premiered on British television on 13 November 2007.

== See also ==
- Guinness advertising
