= AMV BBDO =

Advertising agency

- Type: Subsidiary
- Industry: Advertising, marketing
- Headquarters: London, England
- Key people: Sarah Douglas; (CEO); Alex Grieve; (ECD)
- Parent: BBDO
- Website: www.amvbbdo.com

AMV BBDO is an advertising agency that works with over 85 brands, including BT, Diageo, Walkers, and Mars. AMV campaigns may incorporate digital, social, experiential, print or broadcast media.

AMV is part of the BBDO network, the third-largest agency network in the world and part of the Omnicom Group.

== Company overview ==
AMV's in-house capability includes: community management, data analysis, video content production, live event management and brand partnerships.

AMV has produced several award-winning campaigns, including Guinness's 'Surfer' and more recent work:

- Walkers Sandwich
- Snickers 'You're Not You When You're Hungry'
- The National Lottery '#pleasenotthem'

In August 2016, the agency lost the Sainsbury's account, that it had held for 35 years, to Wieden+Kennedy.

== Team ==
Alex Grieve is Executive Creative Director and Sarah Douglas is CEO.

== History ==
AMV was founded by David Abbott (1938-2014), Peter Mead, and Adrian Vickers.

== See also ==
- J. R. Hartley (1983)
- "Move Over" (1997)
- Good things come to those who wait (Guinness) (1998–2007)
- Swimblack (1998)
- Surfer (advertisement) (1999)
- Bet on Black (2000)
- Dreamer (advertisement) (2001)
- Dog Breath (2003)
- Mustang (advertisement) (2004)
- "Wizards in Winter" (2004)
- noitulovE (2005)
- Fridge (advertisement) (2006)
- BBC Two "Window on the World" idents (2007–2014)
- John Hammond, Intolerant Champion (2015)
