= Pyotr Arsenievich Smirnov =

Russian entrepreneur

Pyotr Smirnov
- Пётр Арсеньевич Смирнов
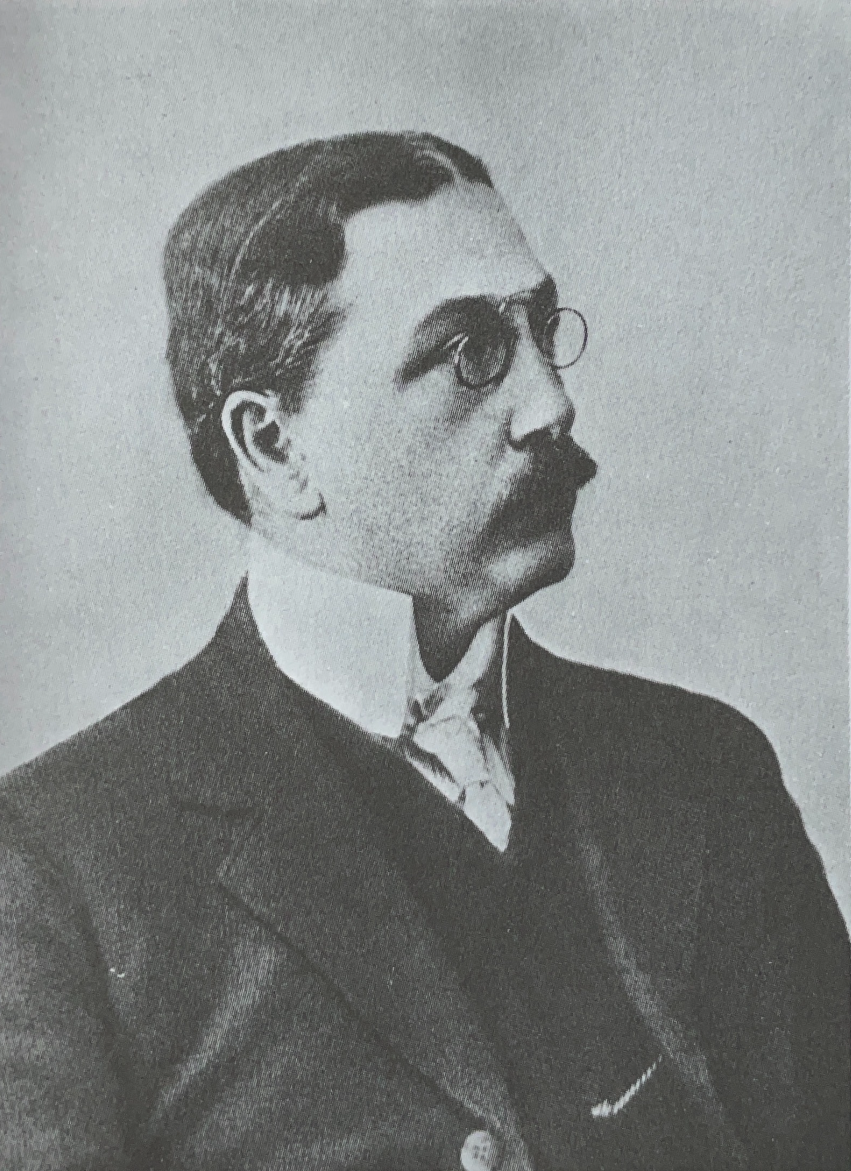
- Born: 9 January 1831; Kayurovo, Yaroslavl Governorate, Russian Empire
- Died: 29 November 1898 (aged 67); Moscow
- Citizenship: Russian Empire
- Occupations: Entrepreneur; winemaker
- Known for: Smirnoff vodka
- Spouse(s): Natalia Aleksandrovna Smirnova (Tarakanova) d. 1873; Maria (1858-1898)

Pyotr Arsenievich Smirnov (Russian: Пётр Арсе́ньевич Смирно́в; January 9, 1831 – November 29, 1898) was a Russian businessman, who created Russia's leading pre-revolutionary vodka company, a predecessor of both Smirnoff and Smirnov companies. He was born a serf in Kayurovo, a small Russian village, on 9 January 1831, and rose to become one of the wealthiest men in Russia.

== Birth and early years ==
Born in 1831 to a poor serf family, Smirnov established his distillery as PA Smirnov in Moscow in 1864 and retained it until his death in 1898.

== Origins and first distillery ==
His distillery was acquired through his uncle Ivan Smirnov, whom had opened in 1815 and left his business upon his death. Smirnov obtained status as purveyor of vodka to the Tsar in 1880s.

== Death, nationalization and relocation ==
Smirnov died in 1898 he was succeeded by his third son Vladimir and remained in family control until it nationalized in 1904. His son decided to relocate given the political uncertainties in 1917 and would re-establish the company in Turkey in 1920 and additionally opened a facility to Lviv in the then Polish Republic and also in France

The distillery became Smirnoff, Smirnov sold the business to Rudolph Kunett, a Russian born American businessman who took the brand to the United States after 1933 (and again in 1938 sold to John G. Martin where the Smirnoff brand appeared under Heublein, Incorporated.) Vladimir died in 1934.
