= Adicolor =

Adidas brand

- Product type: Clothing, footwear
- Current owner: Adidas
- Country: Worldwide
- Introduced: 1983; 43 years ago
- Website: adidas.com/adicolor

Adicolor is a brand of German sports manufacturer Adidas, which consists of several collections of the Adidas Originals clothing line, using mostly primary colors.

== History ==
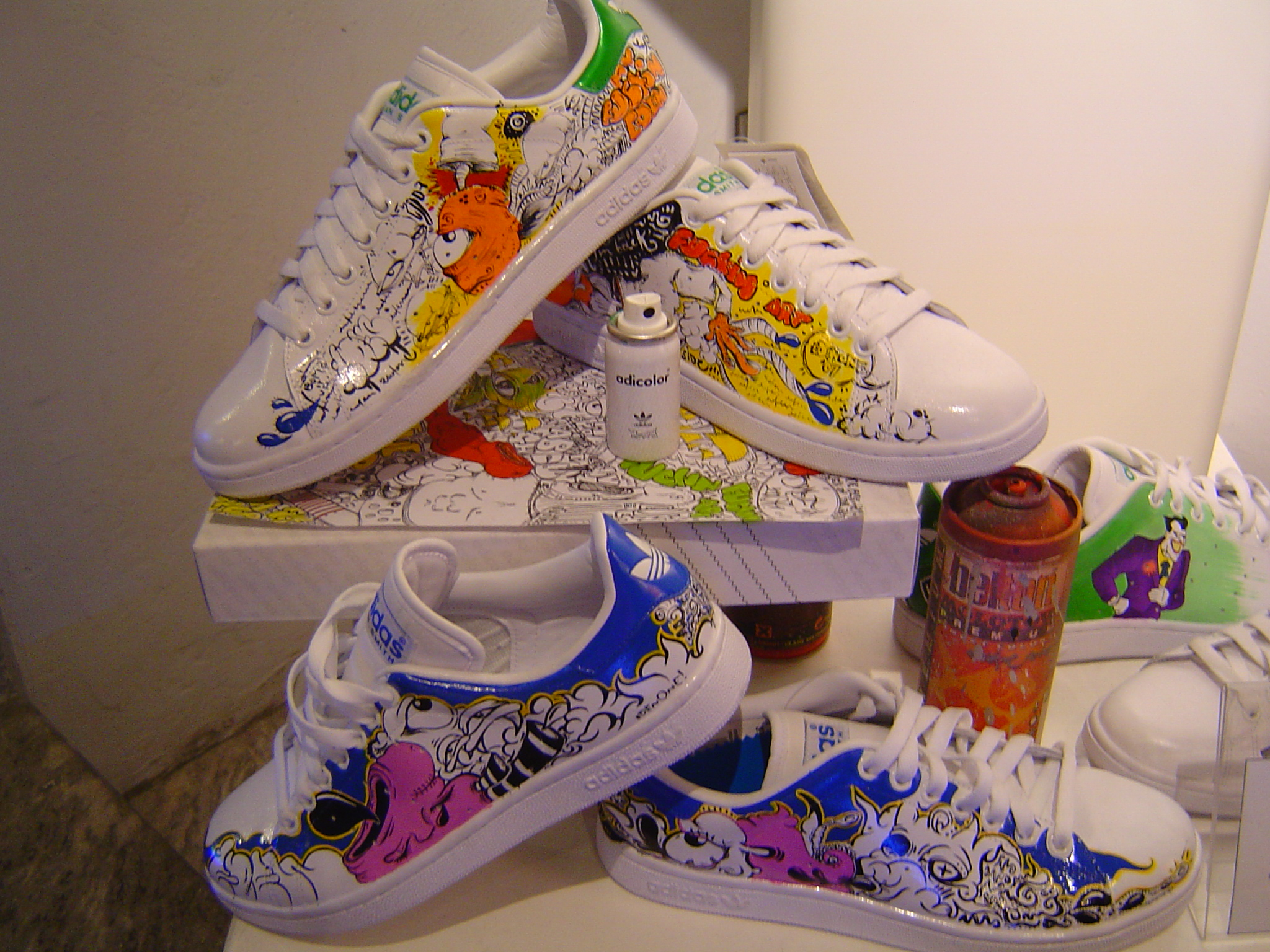
Adicolor Stan Smith models exhibited at an Adidas shop in Milan, Italy

The first Adicolor apparel line was launched in 1983. The brand also launched all-white sneakers that were sold along with marker pens to let customers make art interventions to their shoes.

The Adicolor sneaker was an all-white training shoe was specifically created for the adicolor concept. Presented in a wooden box, the adicolor low-top shoe comes with an all-white track jacket, a set of six colored acrylic paints, paintbrushes, and a wooden palette. The white leather can also be coated with sealant before or after painting.

In 2005 Adidas re-launched Adicolor as a replica of the original. Trainers include characters on them such as "Trimmy" "Betty Boop" "Mr Happy" "Tron" "Miss Piggy", "Kermit the Frog" and Muhammad Ali.

There are similarities between the 1983 version and the 2005 version such as the "ghilly" lacing system and a rubber outsole. Each pair comes with two types of laces, one containing Leonardo da Vinci's quote, "For all those colours which you wish to be beautiful, always start with a fresh white ground".

One of the Adicolor range was criticised by the Organization of Chinese Americans for presenting a stereotyped image of Asians.

== Films ==
In 2006 Adidas released adicolor Films a series of 7 directors' shorts corresponding to each of the main colors in the line: the series was created by independent film studio Idealogue.

- White - directed by Tronic
- Red - Roman Coppola & Andy Bruntel
- Blue - Psyop
- Yellow - Neill Blomkamp
- Green - Happy
- Pink - Charlie White
- Black - Saiman Chow

The series was produced by Mark Beukes, Jacqueline Bosnjak and Sara Seiferheld and was the first campaign to be available for download on the iPod and PlayStation Portable.

Adicolor Films won a D&AD Award and Yellow Pencil for Excellence in short film and was shortlisted at Cannes Lions for the Titanium Award in 2007.
