= Adidas Superstar =

Athletic shoe by Adidas

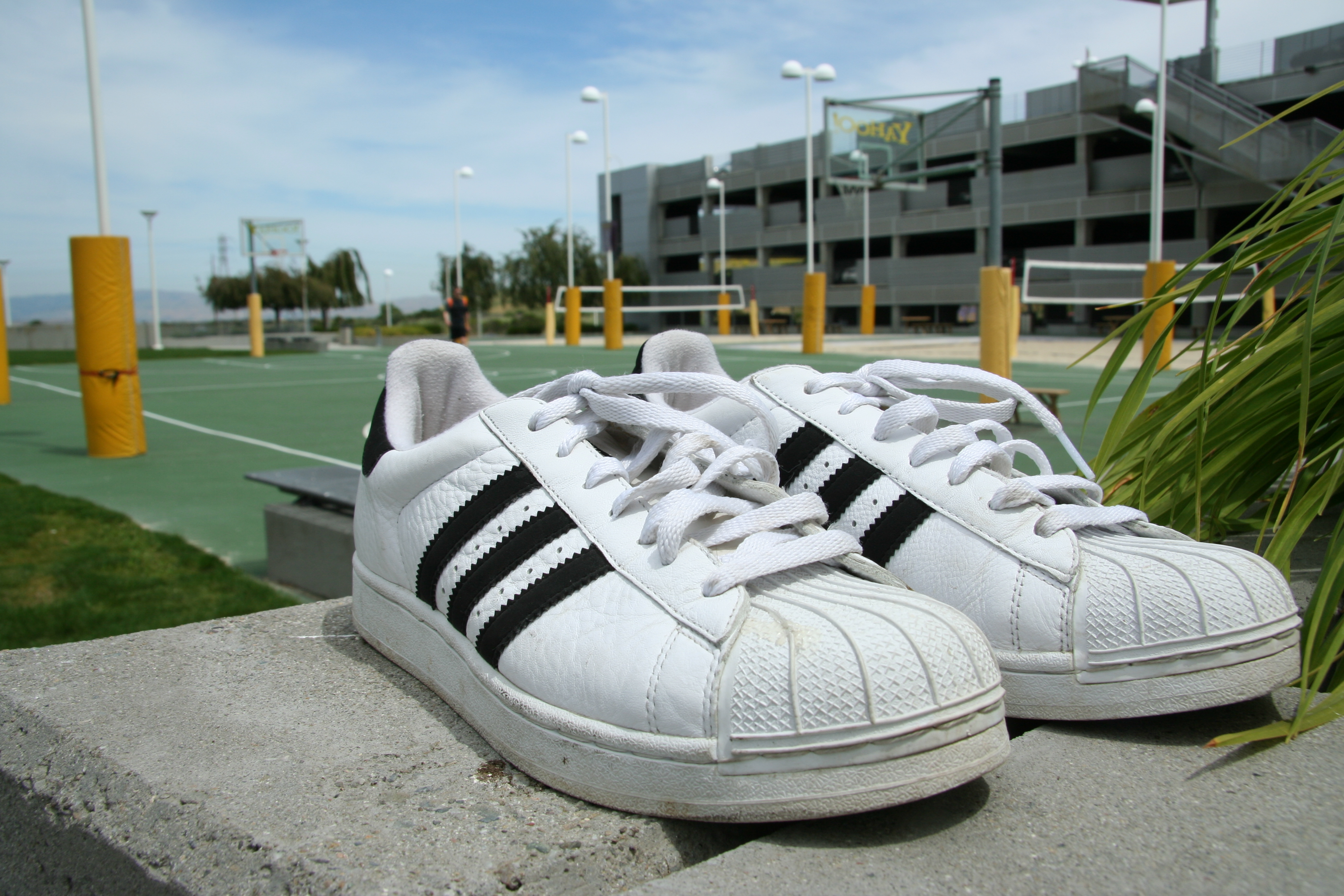
- A pair of Superstar II
- Type: Sneakers
- Inventor: Adidas
- Inception: 1969; 57 years ago
- Manufacturer: Adidas
- Available: Yes
- Website: adidas.com/superstar

Adidas Superstar is a style of low-top athletic shoe which has been manufactured by the German multinational company Adidas since 1969. The design is nicknamed the "shell toe", "shell shoe", and "shell top" due to its rubber shell toe cap.

== History ==
In the early 1960s, Adidas sought to expand into the American basketball market, which at the time was dominated by Converse. The company introduced the Superstar in 1969 as a low-top version of the Pro Model basketball shoe. It was the first low-top basketball shoe to feature an all-leather upper and was marketed as providing better support than Converse's canvas shoes. With its rubber toe protection and non-marking sole, the shoe caught the attention of NCAA and NBA players, notably Kareem Abdul-Jabbar and George Gervin. By 1973, the Superstar was reportedly worn by more than 75% of all NBA players.

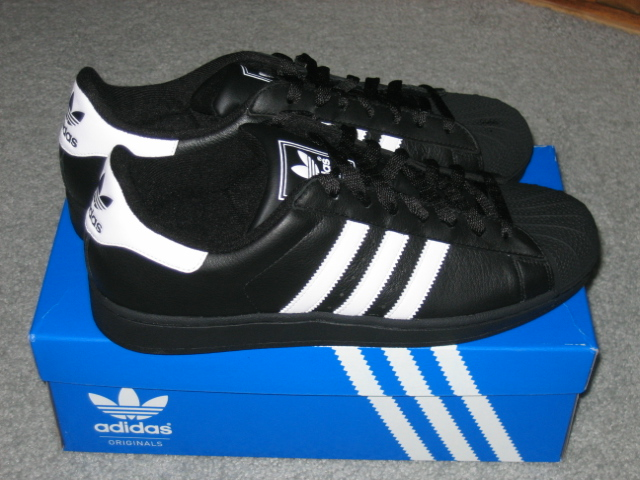
Pair of Adidas Superstar II, with a black color and 3 white stripes

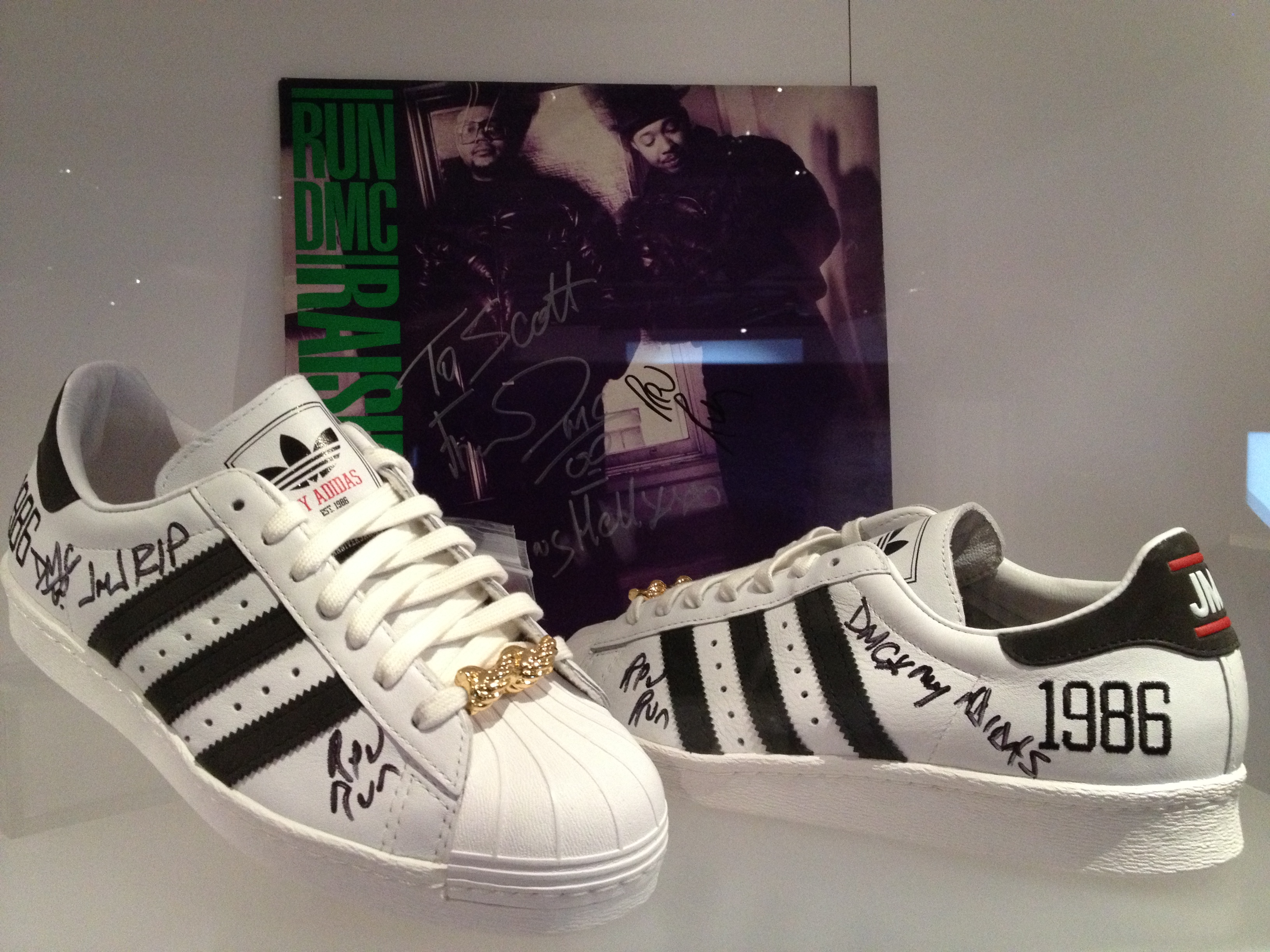
Superstar 35th Anniversary Music Series #15 Run DMC

Around 1976, Adidas released updated versions of the original shoes called the Pro Model II and Superstar II. The designs of both shoes were updated with a new look and better materials. These specific versions of the shoes would eventually lose the "II" and be referred as just the "Pro Model" and "Superstar" by the company, taking the place of the original models. As it was replaced by newer designs for basketball, the second iteration of the Superstar found a new market as casual footwear, propelled largely by the hip-hop and skateboarding scenes. Hip hop group Run-DMC wore regular street clothes on stage instead of traditional pop-standard costuming. The trio continued to wear Superstars on their US concert tour, which in turn increased sales. Responding to an anti-sneaker rap song by Jerrald Deas called "Felon Sneakers", the trio released a song of their own called "My Adidas" in 1986. The song paid tribute to the Superstar shoe and attempted to flip the stereotype of the 'b-boy'. Adidas eventually signed an advertising deal with Run-D.M.C., which was the first endorsement deal between hip-hop artists and a major corporation. The brand subsequently released a Run-D.M.C. clothing line.

== Models ==
=== Superstar II ===
The current Superstar II used to go by just the Superstar until February 2025 when Adidas decided to bring back its original name. Before then, the "II" would only appear in the model's name for collaborations or special releases. This version has been made in many colors and designs, including themes such as NBA teams and major US cities. In 2015, Adidas sold over 15 million pairs of the style, making it the brand's top-selling sneaker of the year.

=== 35th Anniversary Series ===
In 2005, Adidas collaborated with pop icons from the world of music, fashion, and the arts to create the Adidas 35th Anniversary collection, which included 35 different models from five different series.

=== Superstar ADV ===
A skateboard version that released in 2015. The shoe featured a different leather upper to reduce weight, impact protection, and a combined sockliner and midsole for better comfort.

=== Superstar XLG ===
Superstar XLG is a bigger model of the shoe released in 2023 that features a bigger sole and bigger leather upper.
