= Blue screen =

Blue screen, Blue Screen or bluescreen may refer to:

- Chroma key or blue-screen compositing, a technique for combining two still images or video frames
- Blue screen of death, a fatal system error screen in Microsoft Windows
- Blue–white screen, an assay useful in biotechnology
- Blue Screen (novel), a 2006 novel by Robert B. Parker
- Bluescreen, a 2016 novel by Dan Wells
