= Smirnoff =

Vodka brand founded in Russia

- Type: Vodka
- Manufacturer: Diageo
- Origin: Moscow, Russia
- Introduced: c. 1860s
- Alcohol by volume: 35% – 50%
- Proof (US): 70 – 100
- Related products: List of vodkas
- Website: www.smirnoff.com

Smirnoff (/ˈsmɪərnɒf/; Russian: [smʲɪrˈnof]) is a brand of vodka owned and produced by the British company Diageo. The Smirnoff brand began with a vodka distillery founded in Moscow by Pyotr Arsenievich Smirnov (1831–1898), but its modern incarnation traces back to the 1930s, by American liquor distributor Heublein. Distributed in 130 countries, it is manufactured in different countries depending on market, but is not currently produced in Russia or anywhere in Eastern Europe.

Smirnoff products include vodka, flavoured vodka, and malt beverages. In 2014, Smirnoff was the best-selling vodka around the world.

The vodka is unaged, made using a traditional filtration method developed by P. A. Smirnov. Recipe No. 21 was created by Smirnov's son Vladimir after escaping Russia during the October Revolution.

== History ==
Pyotr Arsenyevitch Smirnov (9 January 1831 – 29 November 1898) founded his vodka distillery in Moscow under the trade name PA Smirnov in 1864, pioneered charcoal filtration in the 1870s, and by 1886 had captured two-thirds of the market in Moscow by virtue of the first use of newspaper advertising while suppressing clerical calls for temperance by generously contributing to the clergy. Russian royalty reportedly regarded Smirnov as a favourite. When Pyotr died, his third son Vladimir succeeded him. The company flourished and produced more than four million cases of vodka per year.

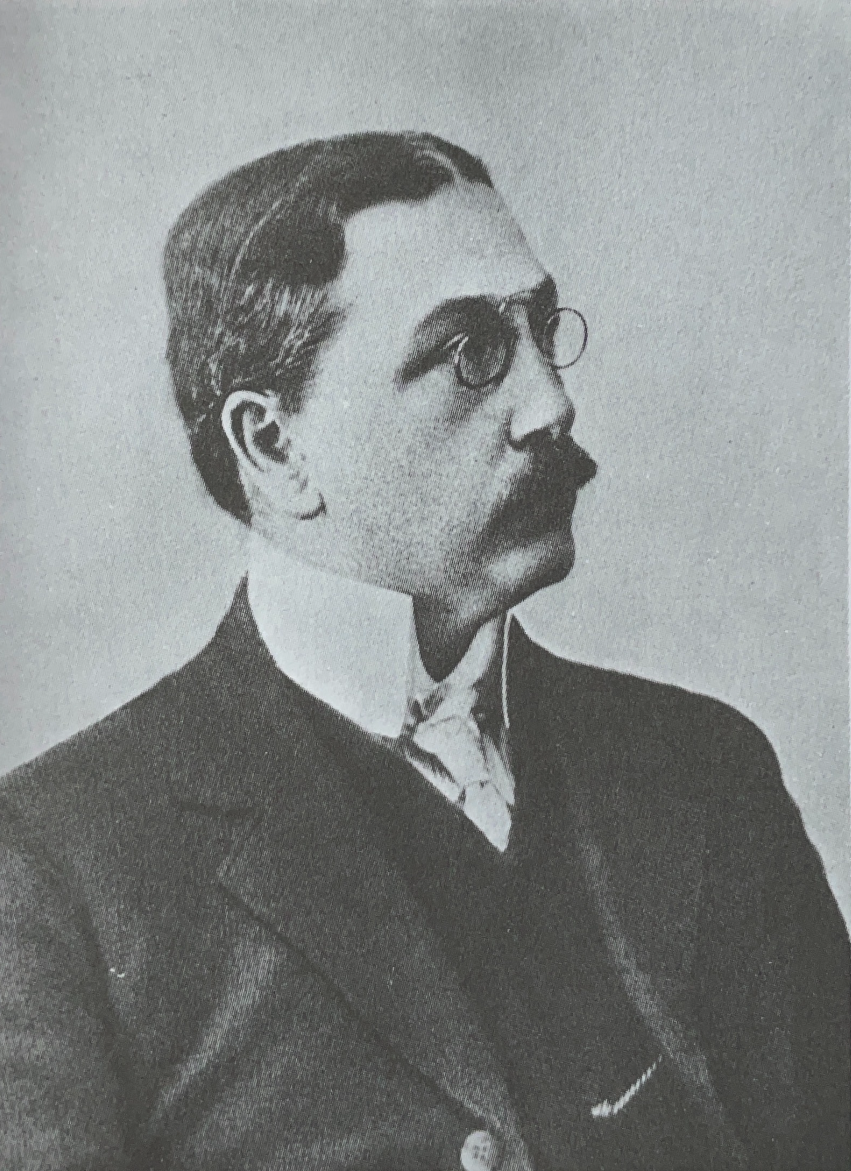
Pyotr Smirnov

When the Tsar nationalized the Russian vodka industry in 1904, Vladimir Smirnov was forced to sell his factory and the brand. During the October Revolution of 1917, the Smirnov family fled the country. In 1920, Vladimir Smirnov established a factory in Constantinople (present day Istanbul). Four years later he moved to Lwów (then in Second Polish Republic, now Lviv in Ukraine). He renamed the vodka "Smirnoff". It sold marginally well but not nearly as it had in Russia prior to 1904. Although an additional distillery was founded in Paris in 1925, sales remained far less than that produced in Russia.

In the 1930s, Vladimir met Rudolph Kunett, a Russian who had emigrated in the 1920s to New York City, and had succeeded in business. The Kunett family had been a supplier of grain to Smirnov in Moscow before the Revolution. In 1933, Vladimir sold Kunett the rights to Smirnoff vodka production and sales in North America. Kunett then returned to the United States, quit his sales job, and established his first North American distillery in Bethel, Connecticut, after the end of Prohibition in 1933. However, the business in North America was not as successful as Kunett had hoped. By 1938, Kunett could not afford the sales licenses, and contacted John Martin, president of Heublein, a company that specialized in the import and export of liquors and foreign foods. Using the $14,000 that the Heublein company made from a new product that ended up saving them from bankruptcy, Martin bought the rights to Smirnoff in 1939. His board thought he was mad. Americans were traditionally whiskey drinkers unfamiliar with vodka and so sales were slow. Sales picked up considerably after Heublein advertised it as a "white whiskey" with "no taste, no smell" sealed with whiskey corks.

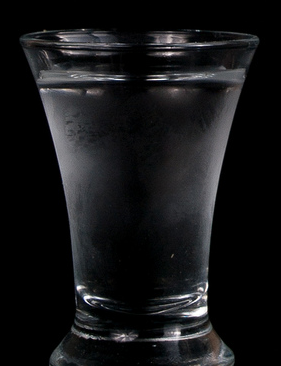
Smirnoff vodka in a shot glass

In 1982, the R. J. Reynolds Tobacco Company acquired Heublein Inc. for $1.4 billion. Its successor, RJR Nabisco, sold the division to Grand Metropolitan in 1987. In 1985 Heublein Corporate Audit Manager Hanson J Kan had recommended to Heublein that it acquire the Grand Metropolitan IDV Smirnoff licensee and its global locations. Grand Metropolitan merged with Guinness to form Diageo in 1997.

=== Since the 1990s ===
During the 1990s, one of Pyotr Smirnov's descendants started producing Smirnov (Смирновъ) vodka in Russia, claiming to be "The Only Real Smirnov." After a number of lawsuits, Smirnoff successfully reclaimed its trademark, while in 2006 Diageo concluded a joint venture deal with the Smirnov company.

The Smirnoff company had the naming rights to the Dos Equis Pavilion (2000–2008), a concert amphitheater in Dallas, Texas, from 2000-08. It also sponsored the Smirnoff Underbelly, a major venue at the Edinburgh Fringe.

In the late 1990s, Smirnoff introduced a series of products into Great Britain and, later, into European and North American markets which quickly became popular among young people, especially within the club scene (see "Alcopops").

Two different products are sold under the name "Smirnoff Ice". One, sold in France and the United States, is a citrus-flavoured malt beverage (5.0% ABV) with variants "Original" and "Triple Black". The other product, sold in Europe (excluding France), Latin America, Australia, and Canada, is a premixed vodka drink; its variants are "Original" and "Black Ice" (or, in some markets, "Triple Black" or "Double Black"), ranging from 4.5% in the United Kingdom to 7% ABV in other markets.

The Smirnoff Ice marketed in the United States contains no vodka, according to the official Smirnoff website. It more closely resembles beer than vodka, primarily because it is brewed. However, outside the United States and countries which receive American-made vodka, it does contain Smirnoff Vodka No. 21.

"Smirnoff Ice Twisted" was a spin-off of Smirnoff Ice that featured such flavours as Mandarin Orange and Green Apple. Confusion between Smirnoff Twist Vodka and Smirnoff Twisted Malt Beverage resulted in the decision to drop the "Twisted" from the flavoured line of Smirnoff Ice. It is sold in 22 oz. (650 ml) bottles and six-packs of 12 oz. (355 ml) bottles.

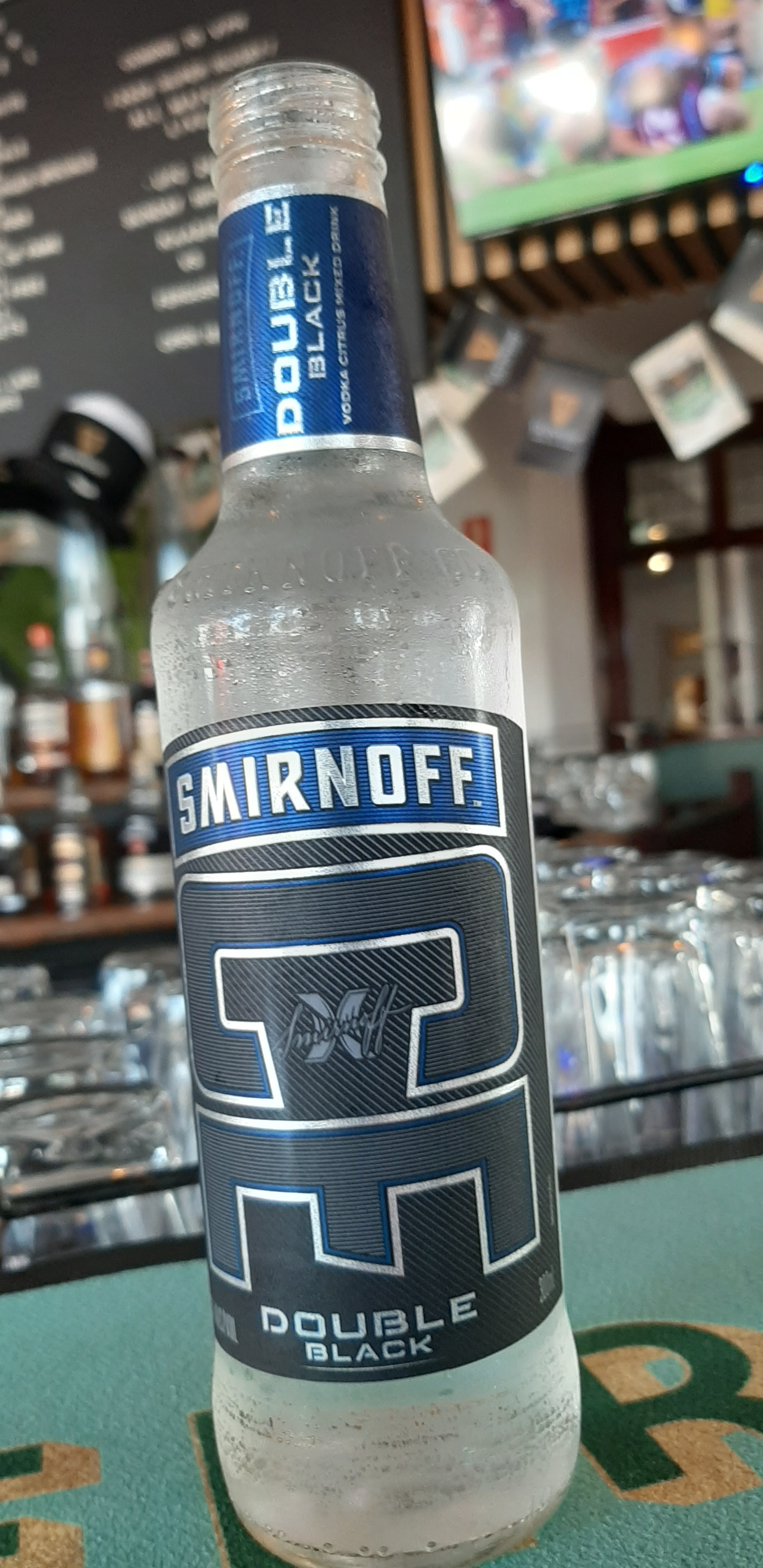
Smirnoff Ice Double Black 6.5% ALC/VOL bottle

The next line of Smirnoff's malt beverages to be produced was "Raw Tea", similar to the brand Twisted Tea. It came in flavours such as Lemon, Peach, Raspberry and Green Tea. This product line was marketed most notably with the "Tea Partay" music video and website. It was sold in six-packs of 12 oz. (355 ml) bottles. It was discontinued in sometime in 2009.

"Smirnoff Source", a lightly carbonated alternative to beer, was released in May 2007. It is citrus-flavoured, made with alcohol (3.5% ABV) and spring water, and sold in 4-packs of 1-quart (947 ml) bottles.

A line of 22 flavoured vodkas (based on the No. 21 Red Label) with the "Twist" moniker appended on the end of the name have also been introduced. Flavours include Green Apple, Orange, Cranberry, Raspberry, Citrus (Lemon), Vanilla, Strawberry, Black Cherry, Watermelon, Lime, Blueberry, White Grape, Melon (Honeydew/Cantaloupe), Pomegranate, Passion Fruit, Pear, Peach, Pineapple, Mango, Coconut, and, most recently, Amaretto.

In 2004, Smirnoff trialled a new blend of vodka in the UK and Canada called Smirnoff Penka. Marketing and distribution were handled by The Reserve Brands of Diageo plc. As of 2007 Penka is no longer available in the UK.

In a 2005 New York Times blind tasting of 21 vodkas, Smirnoff won as the "hands-down favorite".

In 2010, Smirnoff introduced the Cocktail Range. Pomegranate Martini with Meyer Lemon-flavoured Liquor and pomegranate juice, Mojito with a dash of mint and Kaffir lime and Grand Cosmopolitan with cranberry juice. Tuscan Lemonade and Savannah Tea were later added. In 2014, Smirnoff introduced Smirnoff Sours vodkas, available in Fruit Punch, Watermelon, Green Apple, and Berry Lemon.

A 2013 study found that Smirnoff malt beverages were the second-most popular brand specific alcohols consumed by underage youths in the United States.

In 2016, Smirnoff introduced two new Smirnoff Ice flavours: Electric Mandarin and Electric Berry. Also in 2016, Smirnoff introduced the new Spiked line, available in Original, Screwdriver, and Hurricane Punch, as well as their Sourced line of fruit juice vodka, available in Ruby Red Grapefruit, Pineapple and Cranberry Apple.

In 2019, Smirnoff Ice partnered with luxury brand Cremsiffino.

In 2020, Diageo introduced sugar-free Smirnoff Ice, with 4.5% ABV.

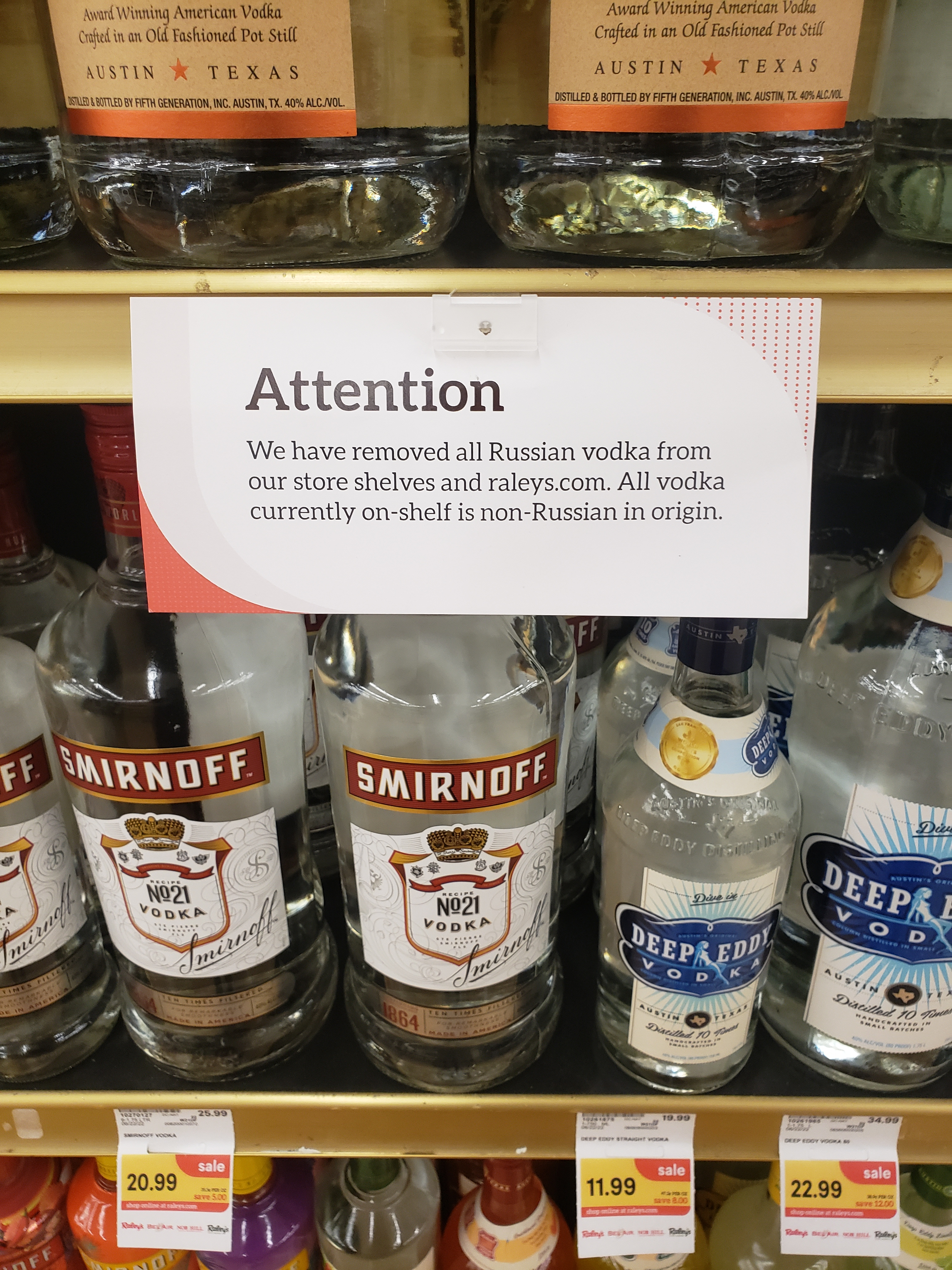
Smirnoff was mistakenly targeted for boycotts during the Russian invasion of Ukraine. Smirnoff is owned by the British company Diageo and is manufactured in Illinois.

Smirnoff was mistakenly targeted for boycotts during the Russian invasion of Ukraine; however, despite its Russian origin, the brand is owned by British company Diageo and for the US market is manufactured in Illinois.

== Manufacture ==
Smirnoff is currently manufactured in the following countries:

- Argentina
- Australia (made in Huntingwood, Western Sydney using neutral spirits from Manildra in Nowra, New South Wales)
- Brazil
- Canada
- Great Britain
- Italy
- Jamaica
- Kenya
- India
- Indonesia
- United States
- El Salvador

Despite Smirnoff's founder being Russian, the modern incarnation of Smirnoff is traced back to an American company, Heublein. Smirnoff is not currently manufactured in Russia.

== Smirnoff numbers ==
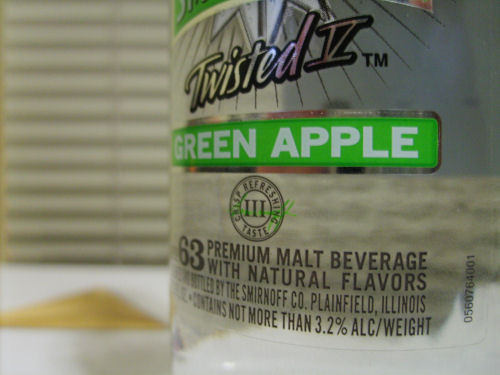
Smirnoff's number and other information is shown at the bottom of the label. Depicted here is No. 63 — Smirnoff Twisted V Green Apple.

Most Smirnoff products have an identifying number that is displayed on the label. Some of these numbers are:

- 21: Smirnoff Red Label, 37.5% or 40% ABV (location dependent).
- 27: Smirnoff Silver Label Vodka, 45.2% ABV.
- 55: Smirnoff Black, 40% ABV. A small-batch vodka that is produced in copper stills.
- 57: Smirnoff Blue Label Vodka, 45% or 50% ABV (location dependent)
- 60: Smirnoff Vladimir, 40%. Available only in Poland.
- 73: Smirnoff Black Ice Triple Filtered, 7.0% ABV.

The basic Smirnoff vodka – number 21 – has performed well at spirit ratings competitions. It was awarded a double gold medal (the highest award) at the 2009 San Francisco World Spirits Competition.

== Flavoured vodkas ==
These are numbered Smirnoff vodkas with flavouring added.

- 21: Smirnoff North (previously Smirnoff Norsk). This is the classic Smirnoff No. 21 Red Label vodka flavoured with Nordic berries. In the United Kingdom and some other markets, it is called Smirnoff Nordic Berries.
- 21: Smirnoff Classic Mix. Smirnoff No. 21 vodka premixed with either lime soda or cola in a 70-cl bottle.
- 21: Smirnoff "Expertly Mixed". Smirnoff No. 21 vodka premixed with cola or tonic water in a 250-ml can. Cola mix is 6.4% ABV, tonic is 7.5% ABV.
- 21: Smirnoff Vodka and Cranberry Juice. Smirnoff No. 21 vodka premixed with Ocean Spray Cranberry Juice in a 250-ml can.
- 21: Smirnoff Mule. Smirnoff No. 21 vodka premixed with ginger beer and lime, 4.8% ABV.
- 21: Smirnoff Espresso. Coffee-flavoured Smirnoff No. 21 vodka, 37.5% ABV.
- 21: Smirnoff Peppermint Twist, 30% ABV. Holiday release 2015
- 21: Smirnoff Sours Green Apple. Smirnoff No. 21 Red Label vodka flavoured with green apple in a 500-ml, 750-ml, or 1 liter bottle. [2014]
- 21: Smirnoff Sours Fruit Punch. Smirnoff No. 21 Red Label vodka flavoured with fruit punch in a 500-ml, 750-ml, or 1 liter bottle. [2014]
- 21: Smirnoff Sours Watermelon. Smirnoff No. 21 Red Label vodka flavoured with watermelon in a 500-ml, 750-ml, or 1 liter bottle. [2014]
- 21: Smirnoff Sours Berry Lemon. Smirnoff No. 21 Red Label vodka flavoured with berry and lemon in a 500-ml, 750-ml, or 1 liter bottle.
- 57: Smirnoff Dark Roasted Espresso. Espresso-flavoured vodka, 50% ABV.
- 57: Smirnoff Spiced Root Beer. Root beer-flavoured vodka, 50% ABV.

== Malt beverages ==
- 63: Smirnoff Twisted V Green Apple
- 64: Smirnoff Ice Pomegranate malt beverage, 5.5% ABV
- 66: Smirnoff Ice Raspberry Burst malt beverage, 5.0% ABV
- 66: Smirnoff Twisted V Raspberry malt beverage
- 67: Smirnoff Twisted V Mandarin Orange malt beverage
- 68: Smirnoff Twisted V Black Cherry malt beverage
- 69: Smirnoff Twisted V Watermelon malt beverage
- 70: Smirnoff Ice Watermelon malt beverage
- 71: Smirnoff Ice Triple Filtered malt beverage, 5.6% (4% in some locations) ABV.
- 72: Smirnoff Ice, 5% ABV. In the United States, it is a malt beverage; elsewhere it is vodka-based. Labeled as "Spin" in South Africa.
- 73: Smirnoff Black Ice, 7% ABV. In the United States it is a malt beverage; elsewhere it is vodka-based. Labelled as "Storm" in South Africa.
- 74: Smirnoff Ice Triple Black. A lime-flavoured malt beverage sold in the United States, 4.5% alcohol.
- 75: Smirnoff Ice Double Black. Sold in Australia, South Korea, and New Zealand. A variation with added Guarana is sold in South Africa and Nigeria. 6.5% ABV
- 76: Smirnoff Ice. Sold in Canada. 7% ABV
- 83: Smirnoff Ice Wild Grape malt beverage, 5% ABV
- 84: Smirnoff Twist Arctic Berry
- 85: Smirnoff Twisted Raspberry. Sold in Canada]
- 92: Smirnoff Twisted Green Apple. Sold in Canada. 7% ABV
- 97: Smirnoff Ice Triple Filtered. Sold in Germany and Portugal. 3% ABV
- 103: Smirnoff Twisted V Arctic Berry
- 110: Smirnoff Ice Double Black & Cola
- 120: Smirnoff Ice Spice. Sold in Japan.

== Products without numbers ==
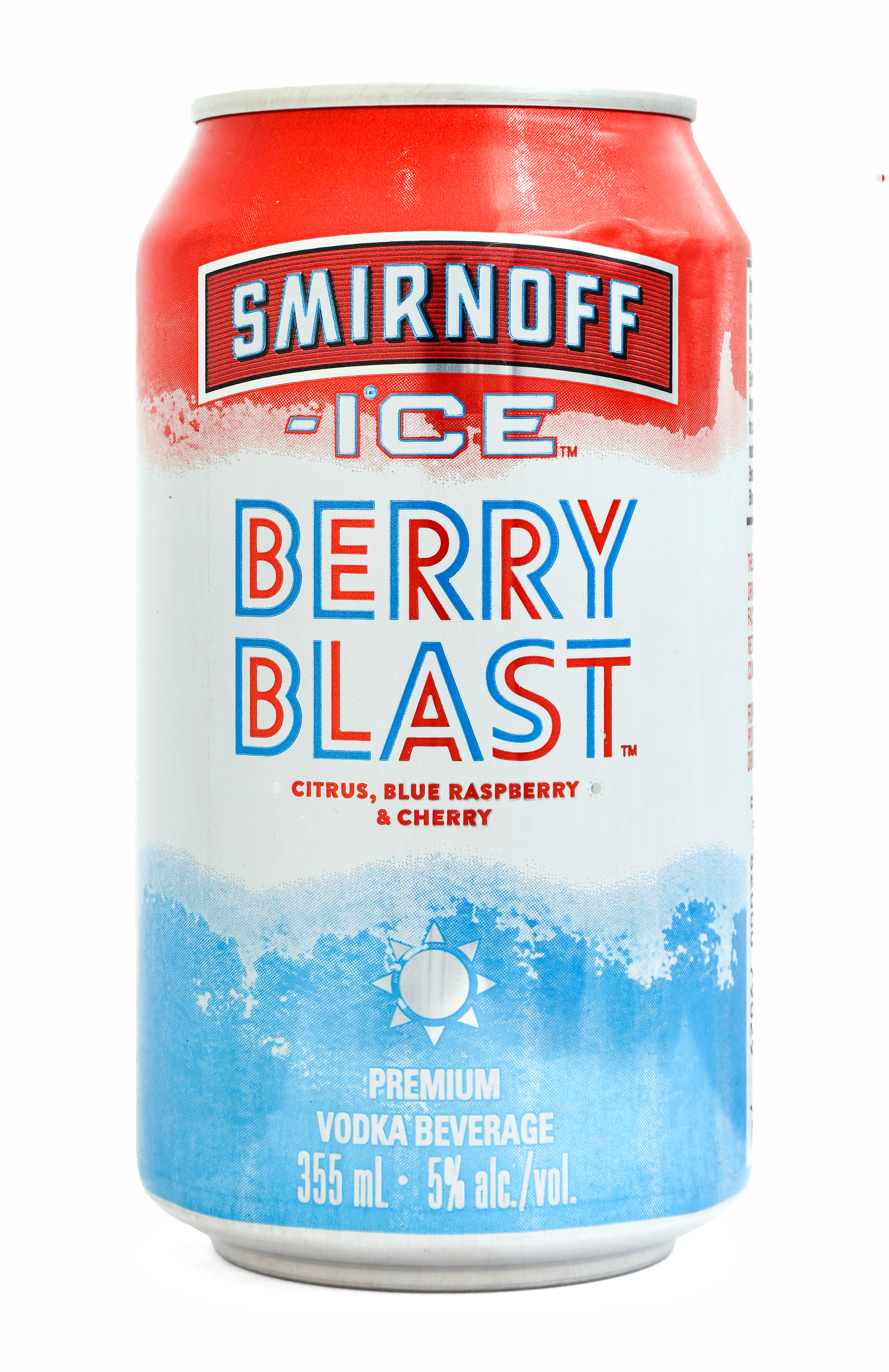
Smirnoff Ice Berry Blast

Some Smirnoff products do not have a number on the label.

=== Flavoured vodkas ===
- Smirnoff Fluffed Marshmallow. Marshmallow-flavoured vodka, 30% ABV.
- Smirnoff Iced Cake. Cake-flavoured vodka, 30% ABV.
- Smirnoff Kissed Caramel. Caramel-flavoured vodka, 30% ABV.
- Smirnoff Whipped Cream. Whipped cream-flavoured vodka, 30% ABV.
- Smirnoff Root Beer Float. Root beer float-flavoured vodka, 30% ABV.
- Smirnoff Cinna-Sugar Twist. Cinnamon sugar-flavoured vodka. 30% ABV.
- Smirnoff Wild Honey. Honey-flavoured vodka. 30% ABV.
- Smirnoff White. Premium Vodka Distilled at Sub-Zero Temperatures for a smoother taste. 41.3% ABV.
- Smirnoff Red, White and Berry. Assorted berry flavoured vodka, launched as part of the 2016 presidential election. Limited edition. 30% ABV.
- Smirnoff Spicy Tamarindo. 25% ABV.

=== Smirnoff Sourced ===
- Smirnoff Sourced Ruby Red Grapefruit. Grapefruit-flavoured vodka with real juice added.
- Smirnoff Sourced Pineapple. Pineapple-flavoured vodka with real juice added.
- Smirnoff Sourced Cranberry Apple. Cranberry-Apple flavoured vodka with real juice added.

=== Smirnoff Ice cocktails ===
- Smirnoff Ice Peach Bellini
- Smirnoff Ice Screwdriver
- Smirnoff Ice Watermelon Mimosa

== Smirnov vodka ==
Smirnov (Russian: Смирновъ) can be seen as the Russian version of Smirnoff vodka. It is made by the Smirnov Trading House, a company that is part of a joint venture by Russia's Alfa Group and Diageo set up in February 2006. The full title of the Smirnov Trading House is The Trading House of the Heirs of P.A. Smirnov.

=== Smirnov's vodkas ===
These are not to be confused with Smirnoff's Red-, Gold-, and Black-label vodkas.

- Smirnov No.21 Vodka [50 cl, 70 cl or 1 liter bottle (40% ABV)] Red and White label with gold border. The vodka, like its Western cousin, is charcoal-filtered.
- Smirnov ЗОЛОТАЯ (Zolotaya > "Golden") Vodka [61 cl bottle (40% ABV)] Brown and Tan label with gold border. The vodka passes through a second gold-alloy filter for a smoother taste.
- Smirnov ИМПЕРИАЛЪ (Imperial > "Imperial") Vodka [61 cl bottle (40% ABV)] Black label with silver border. Comes in a cardboard gift box. The vodka is made in small batches and uses natural honey rather than sugar as an ingredient.
- Smirnov ТИТУЛЪ (Titul > "Title") Vodka [50 cl or 70 cl bottle (40% ABV)] Crimson label with silver border and sculpted bottle. The 70 cl bottle comes in a cardboard gift box. The small-batch vodka is double-distilled in a copper alembic for a smoother finish.

== Awards and nominations ==
Year	Association	Category	Nominee(s)	Result
2017	Diversity in Media Awards	Marketing Campaign of the Year	Digital Pride London	Nominated

== See also ==
- Flavored vodka
- Icing (drinking game)
- Malt beverage
- "Sea", a Smirnoff advertising campaign
- Vodka war in the European Union
