= Adidas Originals =

Line of casual sports clothing

- Product type: Casual and sportswear, sneakers, accessories
- Current owner: Adidas
- Produced by: Adidas
- Introduced: 1997; 29 years ago
- Markets: Worldwide
- Website: adidas.com/originals

Adidas Originals (often stylized as adidas Originals) is a brand of a line of casual and sportswear created by German multinational corporation Adidas. It consists of a heritage line, specializing in athletic shoes, t-shirts, jackets, bags, sunglasses and other accessories.

The clothing and the accessories are under such categories as Superstar and Adicolor, designed by Adidas itself. There was also a collection named "Originals Denim" by Diesel, a concept trialled in New York City and Berlin.

== History ==
The famous Trefoil logo, formerly used on all Adidas products, has since 1997 been applied only to heritage products; the Performance logo, which had from 1991 been seen on the "Equipment" range of products, replaced the Trefoil in 1997 across the rest of the Adidas line. Adidas Originals covers sports fashion styles with references to the decades between the 1940s and the 1990s. The brand has a distinctively retro old school feel.

An extensive campaign was launched in 2008 to promote the label. In October 2017, Adidas Originals opened a new flagship and its largest store worldwide in Wicker Park, Chicago.

== Adidas Originals Worldwide ==
There are many Adidas Originals Concept Stores around the world (Europe, South America, North America, Africa, Asia and Oceania). Adidas had plans to roll out more stores in 2008. In addition to these standalone shops, in the United Kingdom some Adidas stores are located inside of JD Sports stores.

== Collaborations ==
In 2014, Adidas Originals announced designer collections with Pharrell and Rita Ora.

In 2021, Adidas Originals launched its first NFT drop, Into The Metaverse, in collaboration with the Bored Ape Yacht Club, GMoney, and PunksComic creators. Into The Metaverse gave buyers access to limited-edition streetwear and netted more than $22 million within its first day of launch.

In 2022, the sportswear brand announced the launch of its digital platform Ozworld which will enable users to create their unique digital personas. In collaboration with Ready Player Me, Adidas will develop an experimental cross-app avatar platform for the metaverse. Users will be able to create animated characters to try and purchase sneakers from the latest Adidas collection.

== Advertising campaigns ==
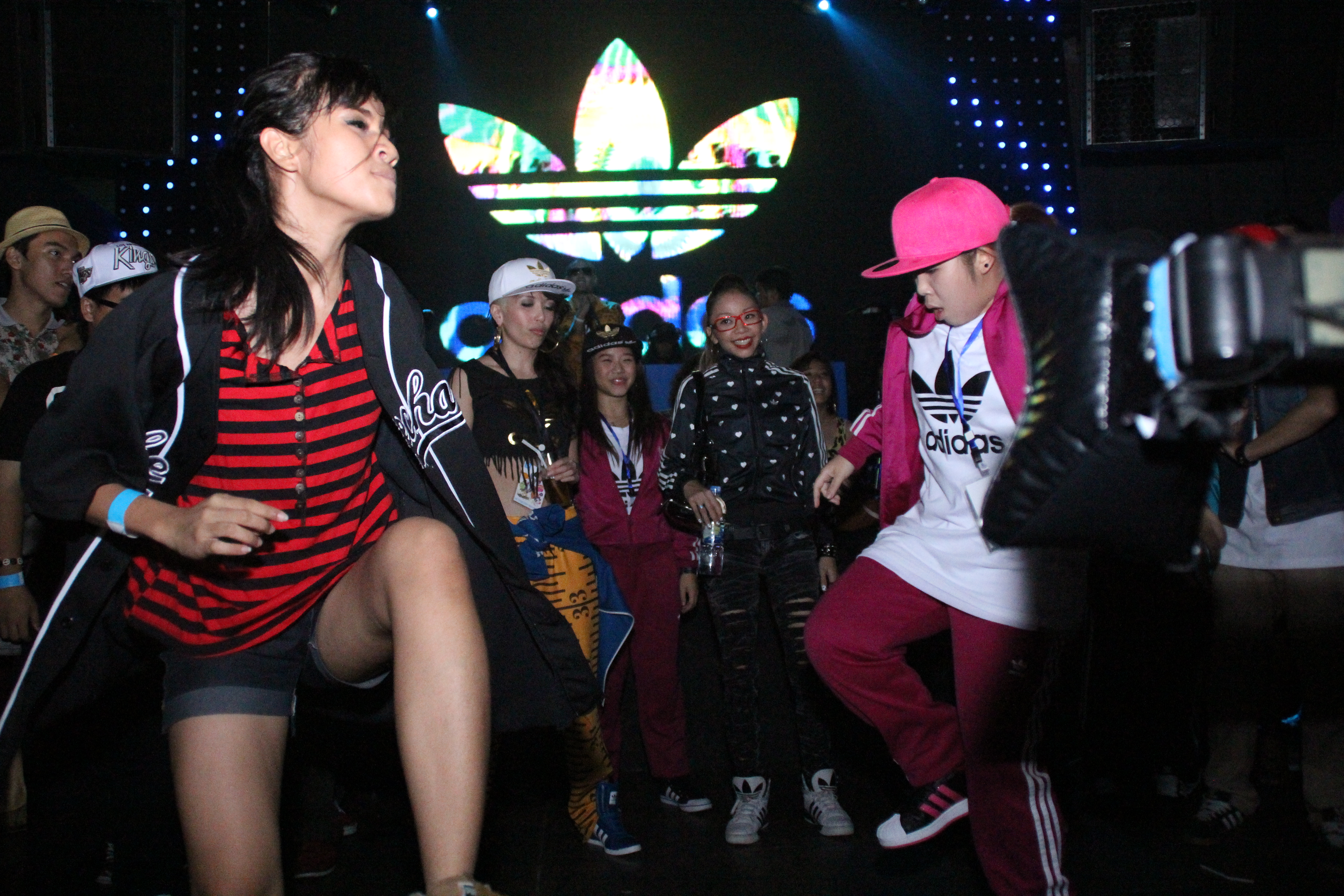
Breathe & Stop, Bangkok, 2011

In 2001, a large scale advertising campaign was launched, and during the campaign Adidas released an advert of a house party with people and celebrities, such as Katy Perry and Jeremy Scott, among others.

Adidas also launched the All Day I Dream About Sneakers campaign in late 2008. The campaign was an Adidas Originals art project that included the creation of nine unique sneaker sculptures and a fictional story of an avant-garde Adidas designer.

"All Originals Represent" was introduced in 2012 featuring brand ambassadors Jeremy Scott, 2NE1, Nicki Minaj and Derrick Rose. It focused on the creative spirit specific to unique cities around the globe.

In 2016, Adidas Originals introduced the "Celebration of Sportswear", which features celebrities such as Jessica Jung, Jay Park, Tian Yo, Charlene, and Pakho Chau.

In 2018, Adidas Originals shared a new promotional film, known as Original Is Never Finished 2018 featuring A$AP Ferg, Playboi Carti, Kaytranada, Adrianne Ho, Dua Lipa, Lu Han, Miles Silvas, Florencia Galarza, Nick Young and Marcelo.

On March 19, 2026, Adidas Originals partnered with Kendrick Lamar and Dave Free's creative company PGLang and its brand new agency Project 3, for an exclusive event at the Lower Grand Tunnel in Los Angeles, called the "Three Lanes", which featured live performances from Baby Keem and Kaytranada, as well as the unveiling and promotion of the special edition away kit designs that the brand manufactured for 25 national soccer teams, those set to premiere and to be worn during the 2026 FIFA World Cup.
