= The best things come to those who wait =

"The best things come to those who wait" was a slogan used in an advertising campaign launched by the H. J. Heinz Company in 1987 to promote its Heinz brand of tomato ketchup within the United States. The campaign was pitched and handled by the advertising agency Leo Burnett Worldwide, who had been responsible for the marketing of Heinz brands since 1974. The central concept of the campaign was that even people in a hurry would wait for Heinz ketchup to trickle out of its glass bottle. Advertisements with the slogan "The best things come to those who wait" appeared in print, on billboards, on television and in cinemas throughout the early 1980s.

The campaign was a popular and critical success, with a number of its print and television/cinema pieces garnering awards from the advertising community. The television and cinema piece Rooftop, an early role for actor Matt LeBlanc, went on to win a Gold Lion at the Cannes Lions International Advertising Festival, considered one of the most prestigious awards in the industry.
