= The Zone of Interest =

Zone of Interest or The Zone of Interest can refer to:

- Zone of Interest (Auschwitz), an area surrounding Auschwitz concentration camp
- The Zone of Interest (novel), a 2014 novel by Martin Amis, named after the above
- The Zone of Interest (film), a 2023 film by Jonathan Glazer, loosely adapted from Amis's novel
