= Bystron =

Bystroń is a Polish surname. Bystroň (feminine: Bystroňová) is a Czech surname. They are derived from Czech bystrý and Polish bystry (possibly from the Polish nickname Bystry), both meaning 'quick', 'alert', 'smart'. Polish archaic feminine forms Bystroniowa (by husband) and Bystroniówna (by father), may still be used colloquially. Notable people with the name include:

- Aleksandra Bystroń-Kołodziejczyk (1927–2016), Polish World War II resistance worker
- David Bystroň (1982–2017), Czech footballer
- Jan Bystroń (linguist) (1860–1902), Polish linguist
- Jan Stanisław Bystroń (1892–1964), Polish sociologist and ethnographer
- Petr Bystron (born 1972), German politician of Czech descent
