= Giesebrechtstraße =

Street in Charlottenburg, Berlin, Germany

- Giesebrechtstrasse
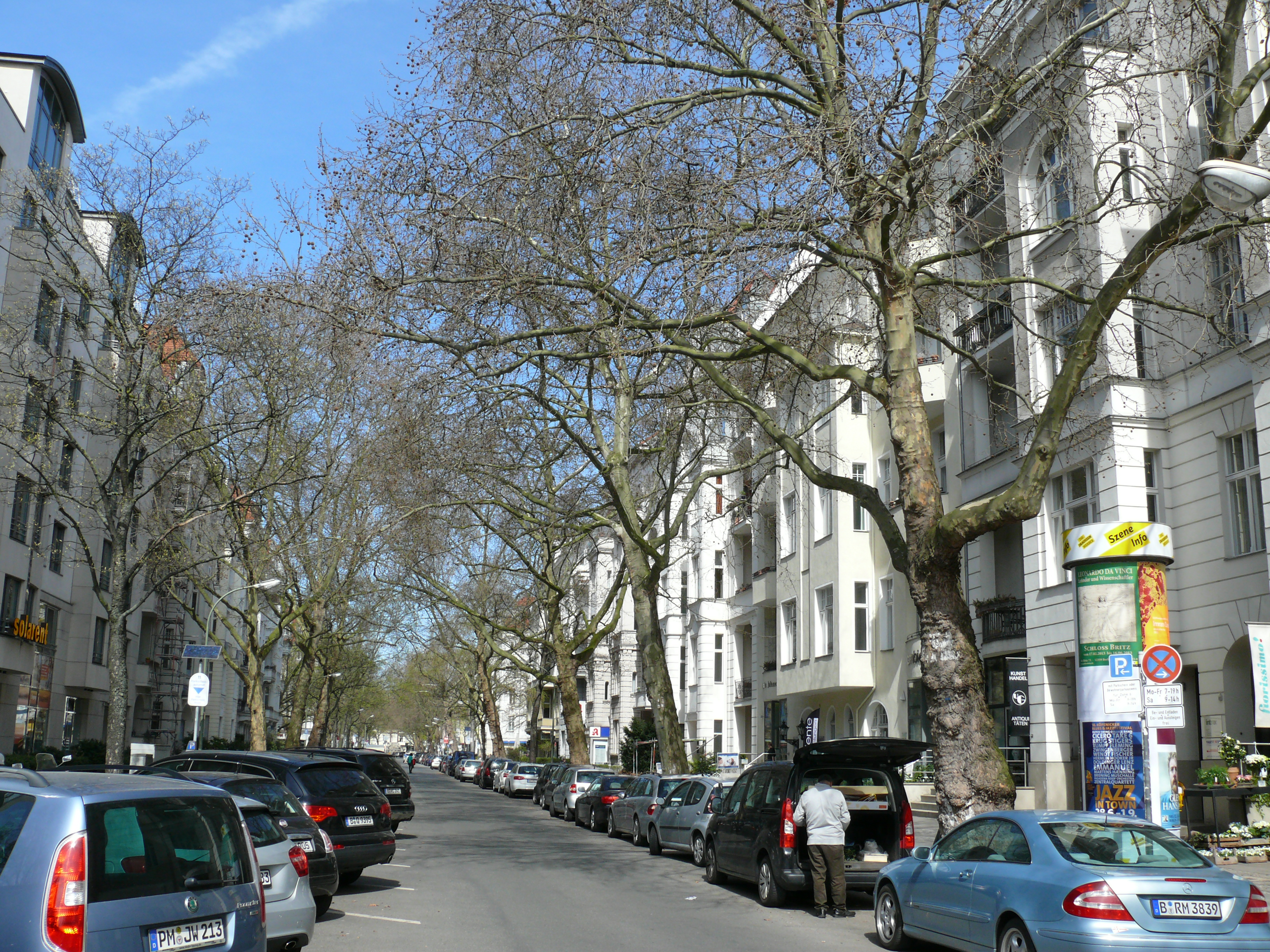
- Giesebrechtstraße
- Interactive map of Giesebrechtstraße
- Namesake: Wilhelm von Giesebrecht
- Type: Street
- Location: Berlin, Germany
- Quarter: Charlottenburg
- Nearest metro station: Charlottenburg; Adenauerplatz
- Coordinates: 52°30′08″N 13°18′35″E
- Northwest end: Wilmersdorfer Straße; Mommsenstraße; Hindemithplatz
- Major junctions: Meyerinckplatz; Sybelstraße; Clausewitzstraße
- Southeast end: Kurfürstendamm

Construction
- Completion: 20 August 1904

Giesebrechtstraße, or Giesebrechtstrasse (see ß), is a residential street that runs between Wilmersdorfer Straße and Kurfürstendamm, roughly a 1 kilometre (0.62 mi) north of Preußenpark, in the western Berlin district of Charlottenburg. It was built in the early 1900s in connection with the development of Kurfürstendamm. It does not branch off at right angles like most of the side streets of Kurfürstendamm, but at an obtuse angle of about 120 degrees.

== History ==
The Hobrecht Plan of 1862 already included the development of this area in Department V for southern Charlottenburg. An "upscale residential development" was planned, but this was not carried out. It was not until the plans for the construction of Kurfürstendamm from 1882 that detailed development plans were also drawn up for the area west of Leibnizstrasse, which were also implemented. The route is not yet shown on the map of 1893, but already in 1900 it is noted without a name. Development began in 1904, so that on 20 August it was named after the historian Wilhelm von Giesebrecht (1814–1889), to match Mommsenstraße, Niebuhrstraße, Sybelstraße, Dahlmannstraße, Droysenstraße, Waitzstraße, Gervinusstraße and Rankestraße, which were also named after historians, as well as other streets in the district that bear the names of scientists. The street was numbered according to the horseshoe principle.

In the Berlin address book of 1905, house numbers 1-23 are listed as new buildings or building sites with the corresponding owners (master bricklayers, master carpenters and architects or the Kurfürstendamm soil company). In 1906, numbers 6, 11-14 and 16-19 were already listed as building sites or new buildings, and in 1907 only numbers 17 and 19 were listed, which means that the construction work can be considered complete.

== Buildings and notable places ==
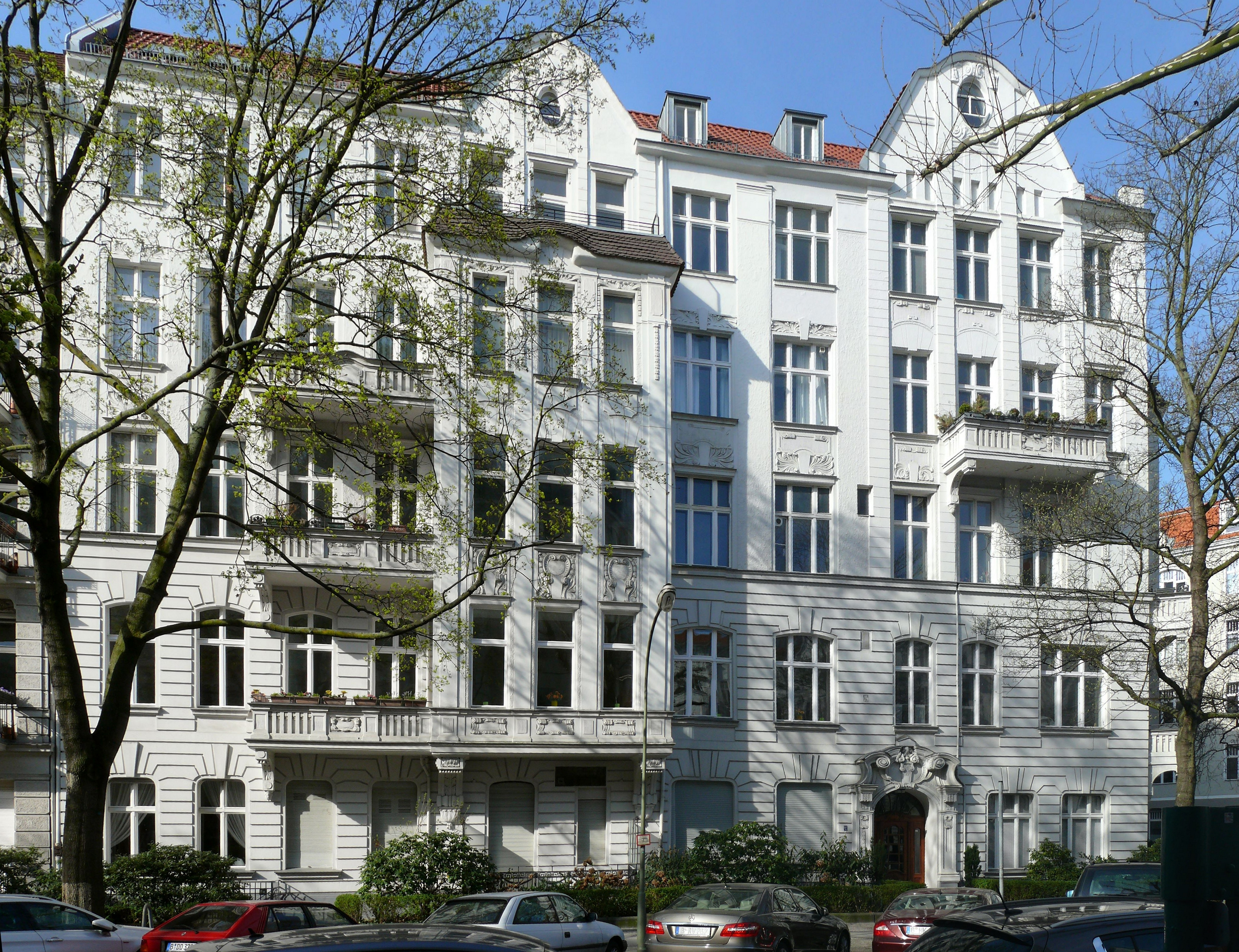
Giesebrechtstraße 5

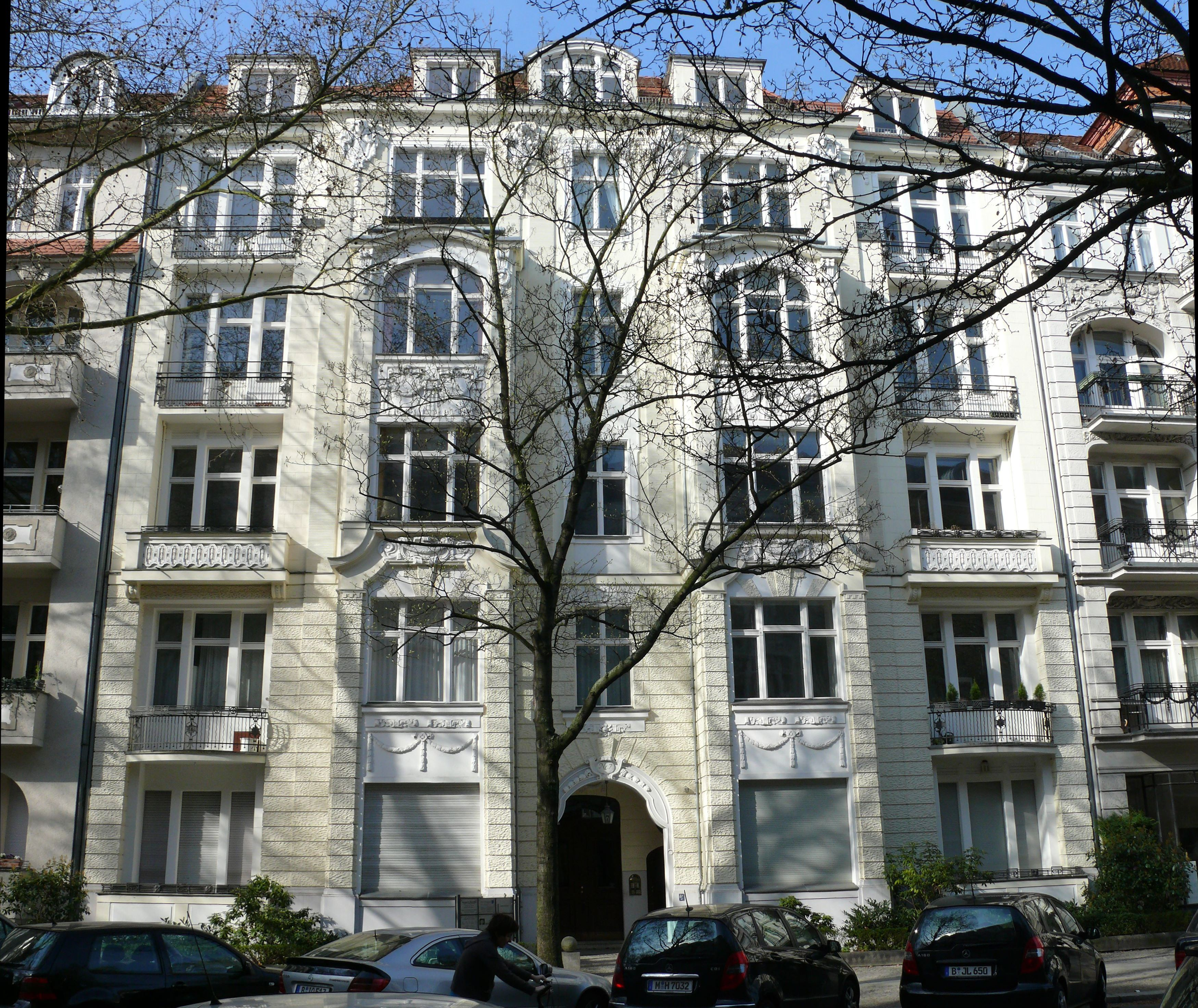
Giesebrechtstraße 7

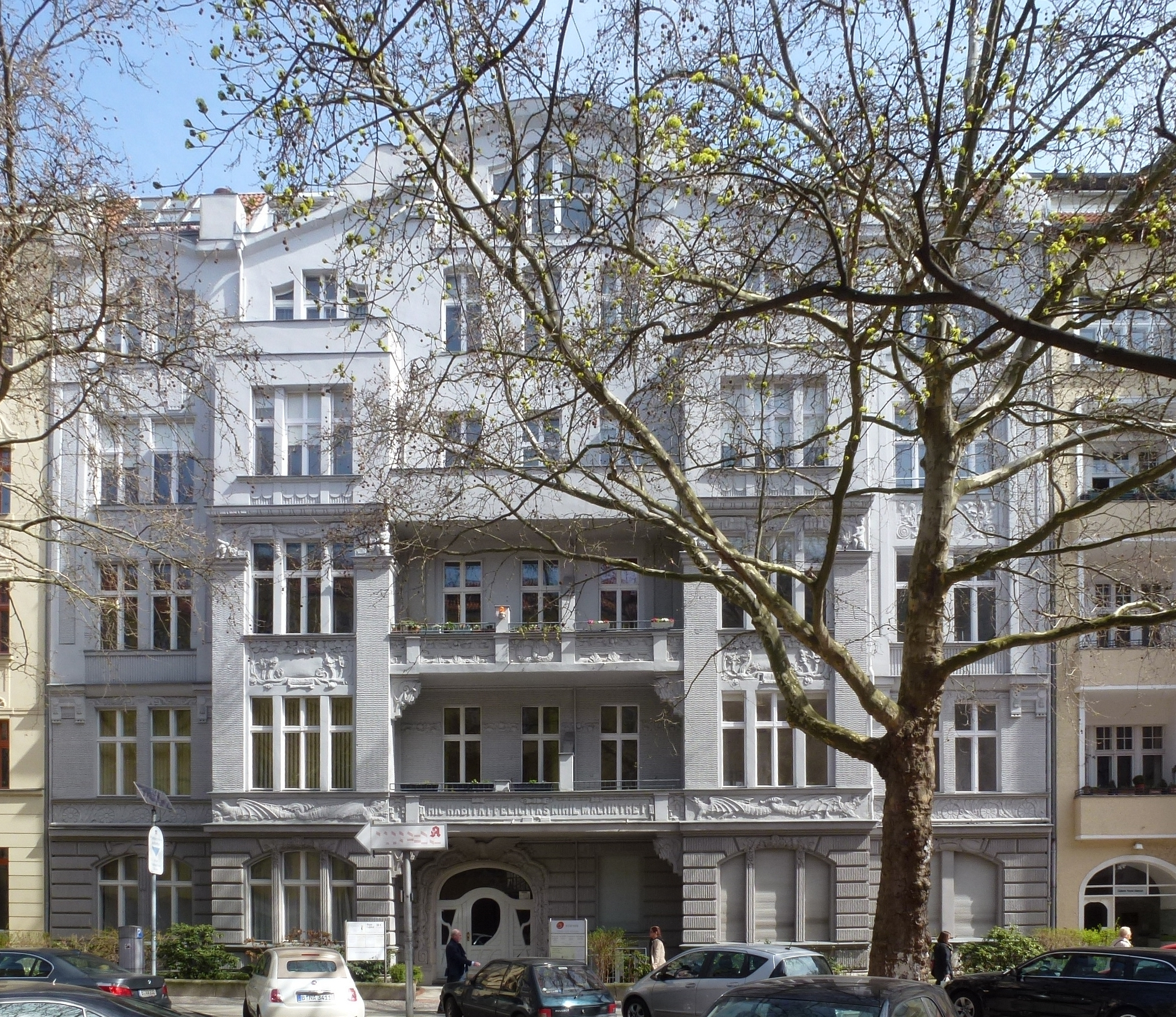
Giesebrechtstraße 20

The building ensemble Giesebrechtstraße 5–8, 13-15 with the adjacent houses Clausewitzstraße 9 and Sybelstraße 64, located between Kurfürstendamm and Meyerinckplatz, was built between 1904 and 1906 and is today a listed "ensemble" as a group of tenement houses. Buildings No. 3, No. 6 and No. 20 are listed as architectural monuments in the Berlin monument list. The corner building Giesebrechtstraße 9 / Kurfürstendamm 63 was destroyed during the Second World War and replaced by a new building. The opposite corner house, Giesebrechtstraße 10 / Kurfürstendamm 92, was also damaged but could be rebuilt. The other houses remained largely undamaged.

From the 1950s until the 1990s, Giesebrechtstraße 3 was home to the Wiener Stüber'l, a wine tavern with impressive interior design that was popular with celebrities and was forced to close with the death of its owner Friedrich Müller. Today, the premises are home to the Julep's restaurant . At Giesebrechtstraße 5, Muslims living in Berlin founded the Islamische Gemeinde Berlin e. V. in 1922. Maulana Sadr-ud-Din from Lahore, a missionary imam of the Ahmadijja-Andschuman-Ischat-i-Islam-Lahore movement, is considered the founder. The community built the Wilmersdorfer Mosque in Brienner Straße. The Rainer Werner Fassbinder Foundation, Gemeinnützige Nachlaßstiftung GmbH is located at Giesebrechtstraße 7.

From the early 1930s, Giesebrechtstraße 11 was home to Salon Kitty, a high-class brothel run by Kitty Schmidt, which was allegedly used for espionage purposes from 1939 by Walter Schellenberg, assigned to the task by Reinhard Heydrich's Reich Security Main Office (RHSA). Ernst Kaltenbrunner, the later head of the RHSA from January 1943, lived in the neighbouring house at Giesebrechtstrasse 12. From August 1967 to July 1968, the political commune Kommune 2 lived at Giesebrechtstraße 20.

In the traditional Café Richter directly on Hindemithplatz, various furnishings are reminiscent of the old days of coffee houses when the street was considered a meeting place of the Charlottenburg scene. Several restaurants and a pub are still located in the street.

== Residents ==
Since then, the street developed into a place of residence for the upper middle classes, among them a large proportion of Jewish residents. According to the address book, military officers, civil servants, professors, lawyers, pensioners, architects, doctors, engineers, merchants, master craftsmen as well as servants (porters, gardeners) and also several artists lived here.

Well-known residents were or are:

- Eduard Künneke, operetta composer and his daughter Evelyn Künneke, singer, dancer and actress, no. 5
- Fritz Oliven, lawyer, writer, librettist, No. 11
- Ernst Kaltenbrunner, head of the Reich Security Main Office, No. 12
- Wolf Vostell, painter, sculptor and happening artist, No. 12
- Joseph Wulf, German-Polish historian of Jewish origin and Holocaust survivor, No. 12
- Friedrich Wilhelm von Willisen, military man, advisor to Heinrich Brüning, No. 15
- Edith Lorand, violinist, no. 13
- Stefan Lukschy, director and author, No. 13
- Paul von Hase, city commander of Berlin 1940–1944, resistance fighter, No. 17
- Grethe Weiser, actress, No. 18
- Hubert von Meyerinck, actor, lived here with his mother, No. 18
- Michael Naumann, former Minister of State for Culture
- Peter Raue, lawyer, art lover and promoter
- Gerty Simon, German-English photographer, Clausewitzstraße No. 2 (at Meyerinckplatz), photographic studio

To this day, the street has remained an upmarket residential area, due in no small part to the size of the flats. Numerous doctors, psychotherapists, lawyers and financial service providers have their business premises here, as do the Winter bookshop at No. 18 and the Horst Dietrich Gallery at No. 19.
