= Salon Kitty =

Nazi era Berlin brothel (1939–42)

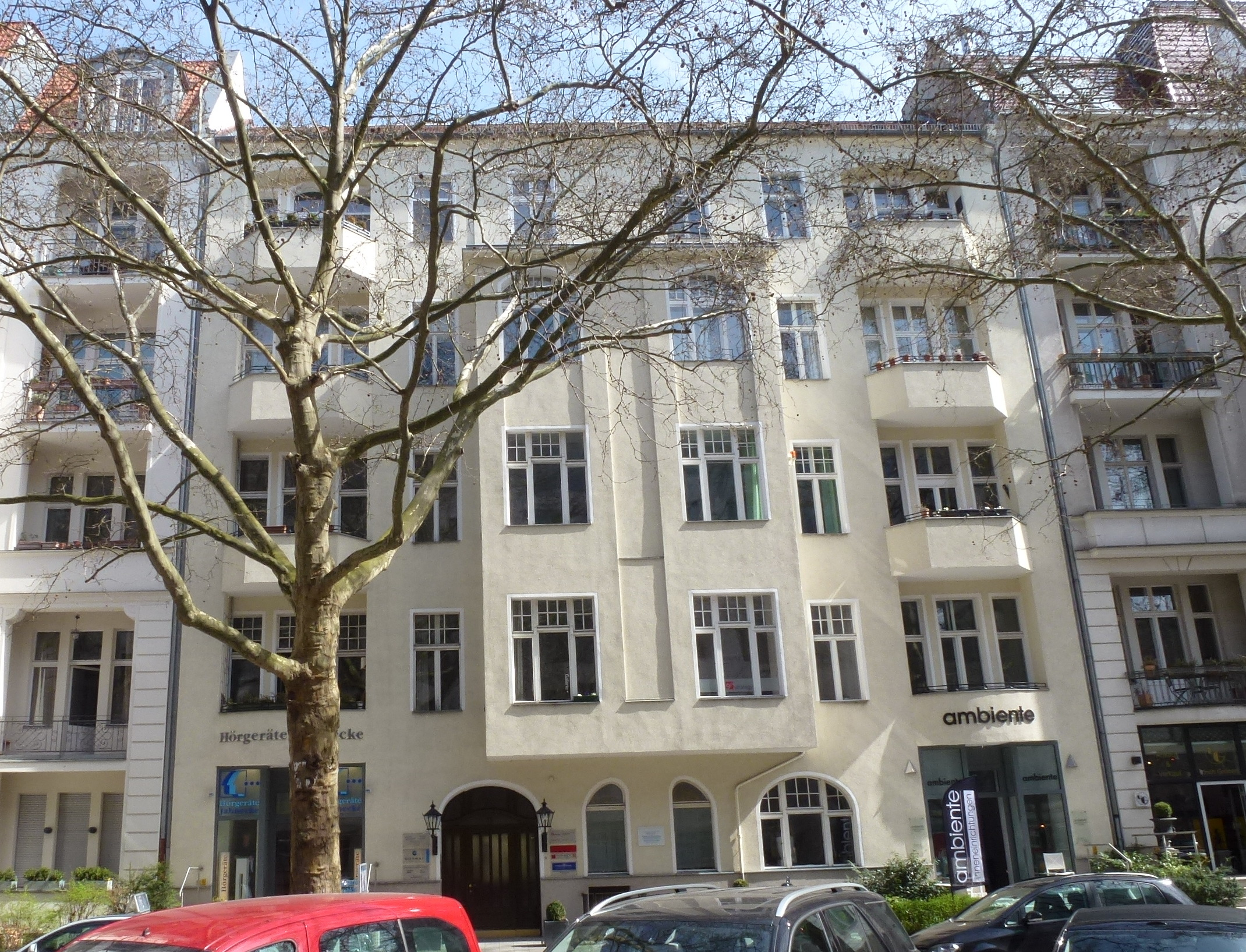
Giesebrechtstrasse 11, Berlin; April 2013

Salon Kitty was a high-class Berlin brothel used by the Nazi intelligence service, the Sicherheitsdienst (SD), for espionage purposes during World War II.

Created in the early 1930s by Katharina "Kitty" Schmidt, the salon was taken over by Nazi secret service and senior SS officer Reinhard Heydrich and operated by his subordinate Walter Schellenberg in 1939. The brothel was overtly managed by original owner Kitty Schmidt throughout its existence. The plan was to seduce top German dignitaries and foreign visitors, as well as diplomats, with alcohol and women so they would disclose secrets or express their honest opinions on Nazi-related topics and individuals. Guests included Heydrich himself, SS General Joseph Dietrich, Italian Foreign Minister Galeazzo Ciano, and Nazi Propaganda Minister Joseph Goebbels. The salon had to relocate after an air raid in 1942, but eventually, as the war progressed, the project lost its importance due to the decreased number of clientele.

Salon Kitty has been the inspiration or subject of brothels featured in films involving Nazi espionage.

== History ==
The brothel's madame Katharina Zammit (Kitty Schmidt, 1882–1954), left, with her daughter, 1922

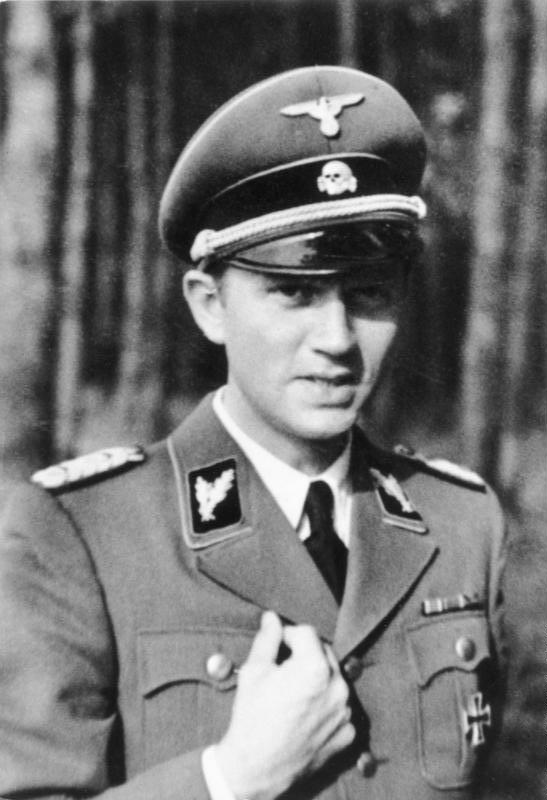
Salon Kitty's undercover operation chief, Walter Schellenberg

In the 1930s, "Salon Kitty" was a high-class brothel at 11 Giesebrechtstrasse in Charlottenburg, a wealthy district of Berlin. Its usual clientele included German dignitaries, foreign diplomats, top industrialists, high-ranking civil servants and senior Nazi Party members. Its madame was Katharina Zammit, better known as Kitty Schmidt, who ran the brothel from its inception.

Schmidt had smuggled most of her fortune to British banks. When she eventually tried to leave the country on 28 June 1939, Sicherheitsdienst (SD) agents arrested her at the Dutch border and took her to Gestapo headquarters. Once there she was seen by Walter Schellenberg, who at that time worked in the counter-intelligence department of the SD. He gave her an ultimatum: cooperate with the Nazis or be sent to a concentration camp.

Using Salon Kitty for espionage purposes was an idea of Reinhard Heydrich, a leading SS general and police chief within Nazi Germany. The idea was to entertain prominent guests with wine and women, so they would disclose secrets or talk about their real opinions to ensure their support could be relied upon. The nine rooms of the salon were lavishly expanded and renovated to the highest standards of the 1930s. Schellenberg installed covert listening devices in the rooms and converted the basement into a "workshop" where every conversation was recorded on wax discs.

For the purpose of espionage, the SS started looking for young women to work in the brothel. In a circular deemed "top secret", Schellenberg asked administrative offices in Berlin for assistance. The requirement profile read: "Wanted are women and girls, who are intelligent, multilingual, nationalistically minded and furthermore man-crazy" (Gesucht werden Frauen und Mädchen, die intelligent, mehrsprachig, nationalistisch gesinnt und ferner mannstoll sind.). Berlin's Sittenpolizei ("vice squad") arrested dozens of Berlin prostitutes and selected the most "emotionally reliable" as potential agents to work at Salon Kitty. They were taught foreign languages, codes, and military insignias, and they were instructed on current affairs and methods to gather information without raising suspicion.

In March 1940, the brothel re-opened, except now Schmidt had a special book of twenty additional women she should only show to certain clients, specifically only those customers who used the secret phrase "I come from Rothenburg".

=== Notable guests ===
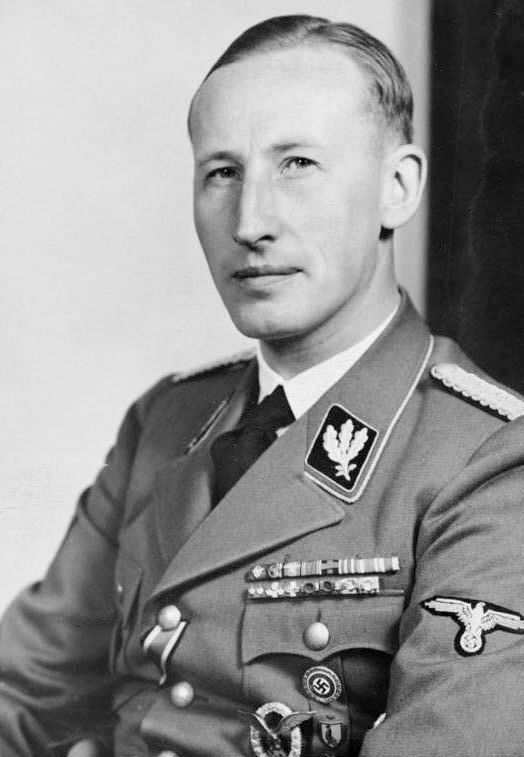
Although married, Reinhard Heydrich made a number of visits to Salon Kitty.

Salon Kitty became even more popular when selected guests in the military and diplomatic corps were told the "secret codeword" and monitors made thousands of recordings during their visits. One of the customers was Galeazzo Ciano, son-in-law of Italian dictator Benito Mussolini and Foreign Minister of Fascist Italy, whose forthright opinions about the Führer were not particularly positive. Another visitor, SS General Sepp Dietrich, wanted all the 20 special girls for an all-night orgy, but he revealed no secrets. Additionally, Propaganda Minister Joseph Goebbels has been marked as a client; he watched "lesbian displays" that were otherwise considered anti-social acts outside of that context. Heydrich also made a number of "inspection tours", although the microphones were turned off on those occasions.

British agent Roger Wilson, under his cover identity as Romanian press secretary "Ljubo Kolchev", noticed the German undercover agents while there, and subsequently the British added their own taps to the building. After that, British intelligence heard some of the same conversations as the SD.

=== Air raid and closing ===
In July 1942, the upper floors of the building were destroyed during a British air attack and the brothel had to be shuttered. When it re-opened in its reduced first-floor-only state, the few clients who remained weren't of interest to the Reich, and the salon was turned over to Schmidt, with the threat that she should keep silent or face retaliation.

Madame Schmidt died in 1954, at the age of 71, without revealing the identity of any of her former clients. The 25,000 recordings from the brothel haven't been found. According to a 2005 article in Die Tageszeitung, the brothel continued to exist after World War II under the management of Schmidt's son and daughter. In the 1990s, it was turned into a home for asylum-seekers, which was closed soon after because of local protest against the residents.

== Legacy ==
A scene from the 1976 film Salon Kitty

The story of what happened at Salon Kitty first came to light in Walter Schellenberg's memoirs, published in Germany in 1956 under the title The Labyrinth. Peter Norden later expanded the story in his 1973 book Madam Kitty. This book became the basis for the highly controversial 1976 film Salon Kitty, directed by Tinto Brass and starring Helmut Berger as Walter Schellenberg (renamed Helmut Wallenberg) and Ingrid Thulin as Kitty Schmidt (renamed Kitty Kellermann).

The 1981 BBC comedy drama Private Schulz, about a German fraudster and petty criminal's unwilling World War II service in the SS, prominently features the salon. In the first episode, Schultz is given the job of staffing the listening post in the brothel's basement and recording the conversations picked up by the hidden microphones.

The concept of the Gestapo using a brothel full of spies to find traitors within the Nazi regime has been recycled several times in various European Nazi exploitation films.

The brothel served as inspiration for the name of a prominent BDSM dungeon in Sydney, Australia. Salon Kitty was in legal operation for 27 years, closing in 2013.

== See also ==
- German military brothels in World War II
- Prostitution in Germany
- Sexual slavery in Germany during World War II
- Films dealing with Nazism and sexuality

== Sources ==
=== Printed ===
- Craig, John (2005). Peculiar Liaisons: In War, Espionage, and Terrorism in the Twentieth Century. Algora Publishing. ISBN 978-0-87586-333-7.
- Frayling, Christopher (2005). Ken Adam: The Art of Production Design. Farber & Farber. ISBN 978-0-571-23109-6.
- Hyde, Montgomery (1985). Crimes and Punishment. Marshall Cavendish. ISBN 978-0-86307-372-4.
- Lepage, Jean-Denis (2013). An Illustrated Dictionary of the Third Reich. McFarland Publishing. ISBN 978-1-4766-0369-8.
- Roland, Paul (2014). Nazi Women: The Attraction of Evil. Arcturus Publishing Unlimited. ISBN 978-1-78428-046-8.
- Stephenson, Jill (2014). Women in Nazi Germany. Routledge Publishing. ISBN 978-1-317-87608-3.
- Brunner, Urs (2020). Kitty's Salon. Legenden, Fakten, Fiktion – Kitty Schmidt und ihr berüchtigtes Nazi-Spionagebordell. Berlin Story Verlag. ISBN 978-3-95723-168-0.
- Jones, Nigel (2023). Kitty's Salon. Sex, Spying and Surveillance in the Third Reich. Bonnier Books UK. ISBN 978-1-78946-613-3.

=== Online ===
- Private Schulz. British Broadcasting Corporation.
- Huhtasaari, Hanna (27 August 2008). "Verführen für den 'Führer'". Spiegel.de (in German). Spiegel Online.
- Hüttl, Tina (11 May 2005). "Wie in ein Nazi-Bordell das echte Leben einzog" (in German). Die Tageszeitung.
