= Zone of Interest (Auschwitz) =

Area around the Auschwitz concentration camp complex

The Zone of Interest (Interessengebiet)

The Zone of Interest (German: Interessengebiet) was a restricted area located around the Auschwitz concentration camp complex in German-occupied Poland from May 1941 to January 1945. The 40-square-kilometer (15 mi^{2}; 9,900-acre) zone was reserved for the Schutzstaffel (SS) and contained Nazi Germany's largest extermination complex, including the main Auschwitz concentration camp (from which it was administered), the Auschwitz-Birkenau extermination camp, and numerous subcamps.

The Zone of Interest was patrolled by the SS, Gestapo, and local police.

== History ==
The Zone of Interest was unofficially established in July 1940, a few weeks after the initial Auschwitz I camp of the Auschwitz concentration camp complex began operation. Erich von dem Bach-Zelewski, the Higher SS and Police Leader of Silesia, ordered the creation of a restricted zone around Auschwitz I following the first successful escape of a prisoner. Bach-Zelewski's order required the forced resettlement of the local Polish population from within 5-kilometer (3.1 mi) radius of the camp, to prevent them from aiding escapees. Residents of the adjacent hamlet of Zasole (not to be confused with the nearby village of Zasole) were also forced to evacuate their homes, which were subsequently inhabited by Schutzstaffel (SS) camp officers and their families.

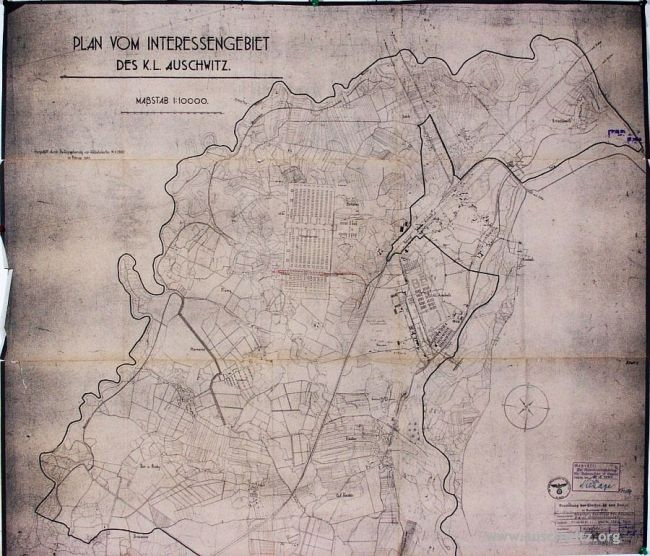
Map of the Zone of Interest from 1941.

On 1 March 1941, SS leader Heinrich Himmler inspected Auschwitz I, ordering most of the area west of Auschwitz town between the Vistula and Soła rivers to be under camp administration. Residents of surrounding villages were forcibly resettled, except Poles who could provide skilled labour to the SS were allowed to remain. A second camp was constructed in Birkenau (Brzezinka), about 3 kilometers (1.9 mi) north-west of Auschwitz I, which became Auschwitz-Birkenau. A ring of concrete walls, electrified fences, and watchtowers were built around the zone, which was patrolled by the SS. On 31 May 1941, the Zone of Interest was officially established.

Auschwitz camp authorities created the Zone of Interest in order to:

- Remove the local Polish population from these areas and take over agricultural land from them;
- Allegedly "re-educate" prisoners by using their agricultural work;
- Obtain financial benefits for the SS from the sale of agricultural produce; and
- Reduce contact between prisoners and the remaining local residents.

In addition, the zone was to implement a plan to create at least two "model training villages" in these areas for German farmers.

== In fiction ==
The term was used by Martin Amis as the title for his novel The Zone of Interest (2014), centered around a fictionalized version of the camp commandant Rudolf Höss. It was used later by Jonathan Glazer for his 2023 film of the same name, loosely adapted from Amis' novel, and focusing on the banality of the Höss family's lives in the shadow of the epicenter of the Holocaust.

== Bibliography ==
- Benz, Wolfgang; Distel, Barbara; Königseder, Angelika, eds. (2005). Der Ort des Terrors: Geschichte der nationalsozialistischen Konzentrationslager. München: C.H. Beck. ISBN 978-3-406-52960-3.
- Steinbacher, Sybille (2004). Auschwitz: Geschichte und Nachgeschichte. Beck'sche Reihe (Originalausg ed.). München: Beck. ISBN 978-3-406-50833-2.
