= Joseph Wulf =

German-Polish Jewish historian (1912–1974)

- Identification photograph in occupied Kraków, 1940
- Born: 22 December 1912; Chemnitz, Saxony, German Empire
- Died: 10 October 1974 (aged 61); Charlottenburg, West Berlin
- Occupation: Historian
- Known for: Wannsee House Memorial

Joseph Wulf ([ˈjoːzɛf vʊlf]; 22 December 1912 – 10 October 1974) was a German-Polish Jewish historian. A survivor of the Auschwitz concentration camp, he was the author of several books about Nazi Germany and the Holocaust, including Das Dritte Reich und die Juden (with Léon Poliakov, 1955); Heinrich Himmler (1960); and Martin Bormann: Hitlers Schatten (1962). The House of the Wannsee Conference museum in Berlin houses the Joseph Wulf Library in his honour.

== Early life ==
Born in Chemnitz, Germany, the child of a wealthy Jewish merchant, Wulf was raised from 1917 in Kraków, Poland, and educated there in Jewish studies and agriculture. His father had hoped he would become a rabbi, but he turned instead to writing.

Before the war, he married Jenta Falik-Dachner, with whom he had a son, David.

== The Holocaust ==
After Nazi Germany occupied Poland in 1939, sparking World War II, the Wulf family was deported to the Kraków Ghetto. He became close to famed poet/songwriter Mordechai Gebirtig and painter Abraham Neumann in the ghetto.

Wulf joined a group of Jewish resistance fighters, but he was captured and imprisoned in the Auschwitz concentration camp in 1943, slave labor subcamp Buna-Monowitz. While there, he made the decision to dedicate his life to exposing Nazi crimes. This commitment found fruition after the war, working for the Jewish Historical Commission in Krakow and co-founding of the Centre for the History of Polish Jews in Paris. There, he recorded a number of Yiddish songs to preserve the work of his ghetto friend Gebirtig and of Jakub Weingarten. He also preserved two songs he composed while in Auschwitz, including Sunbeams, which features prominently in the 2023 film The Zone of Interest.

He survived one of the notorious death marches that took place just before the camp's liberation, when the SS forced inmates to move to different camps after fleeing, on 18 January 1945.

Wulf's wife and son survived the war by hiding with Polish peasants, but he lost his father, mother, brother, mother-in-law, and young niece.

== Writing and research ==
At the end of the war, Wulf remained in Poland, where from 1945 to 1947 he co-founded the Central Jewish Historical Commission, publishing documents about Nazi Germany. He moved to Stockholm and in the summer of 1947 to Paris, working for a newspaper and the Centre pour l'Histoire des Juifs Polonais, where he met Léon Poliakov, the French historian. In 1952 he and his wife moved to Berlin. Steven Lehrer writes that Wulf "cut an unmistakeable figure ... [h]e dressed impeccably, carried a walking stick, and held a long cigarette holder clenched between his teeth at a jaunty angle."

Wulf and Poliakov co-wrote Das Dritte Reich und die Juden ("The Third Reich and the Jews"), 1955, published in Berlin by the Arani Verlag. It was followed by two more volumes, Das Dritte Reich und seine Diener ("The Third Reich and its Servants"), 1956, and Das Dritte Reich und seine Denker ("The Third Reich and its Thinkers"), 1959. Nicolas Berg writes that the work "marked the breaking of a West German taboo", placing the Holocaust at the centre of its study of Nazi Germany, unlike the approach of other German historians at the time, and using direct language. Violence and mass murder had been goals of the regime, they wrote, not a means to achieve some other goal. According to Berg, the books were generally regarded as important, but German historians looked down on them as unscholarly.

The first volume included a document signed by Otto Bräutigam, an adviser to Konrad Adenauer, West German Chancellor from 1949 to 1963. Bräutigam had worked for the Nazi's Reich Ministry for the Occupied Eastern Territories. The document signed by Bräutigam said: "Through word of mouth, clarity may well have meanwhile been reached in the Jewish Question," an apparent reference to the Final Solution to the Jewish Question. The publication of this document attracted national and international press coverage. The Federal Defence Ministry refused to include the first volume in its list of books recommended for the German army's libraries, because it contained documents signed by military leaders during the Third Reich who were still active in West Germany.

Wulf went on to publish several more works about Nazi Germany, among them biographies of Heinrich Himmler and Martin Bormann. In 1961 he won the Leo Baeck Prize and in 1964 the Carl von Ossietzky Medal. He was also awarded an honorary doctorate by the Free University of Berlin.

Wulf's most widely-distributed work is Sunbeams, a song he recorded as an afterthought while preserving the work of other composers. It is a highlight in the 2023 film The Zone of Interest.

== Wannsee memorial ==
=== Proposal ===
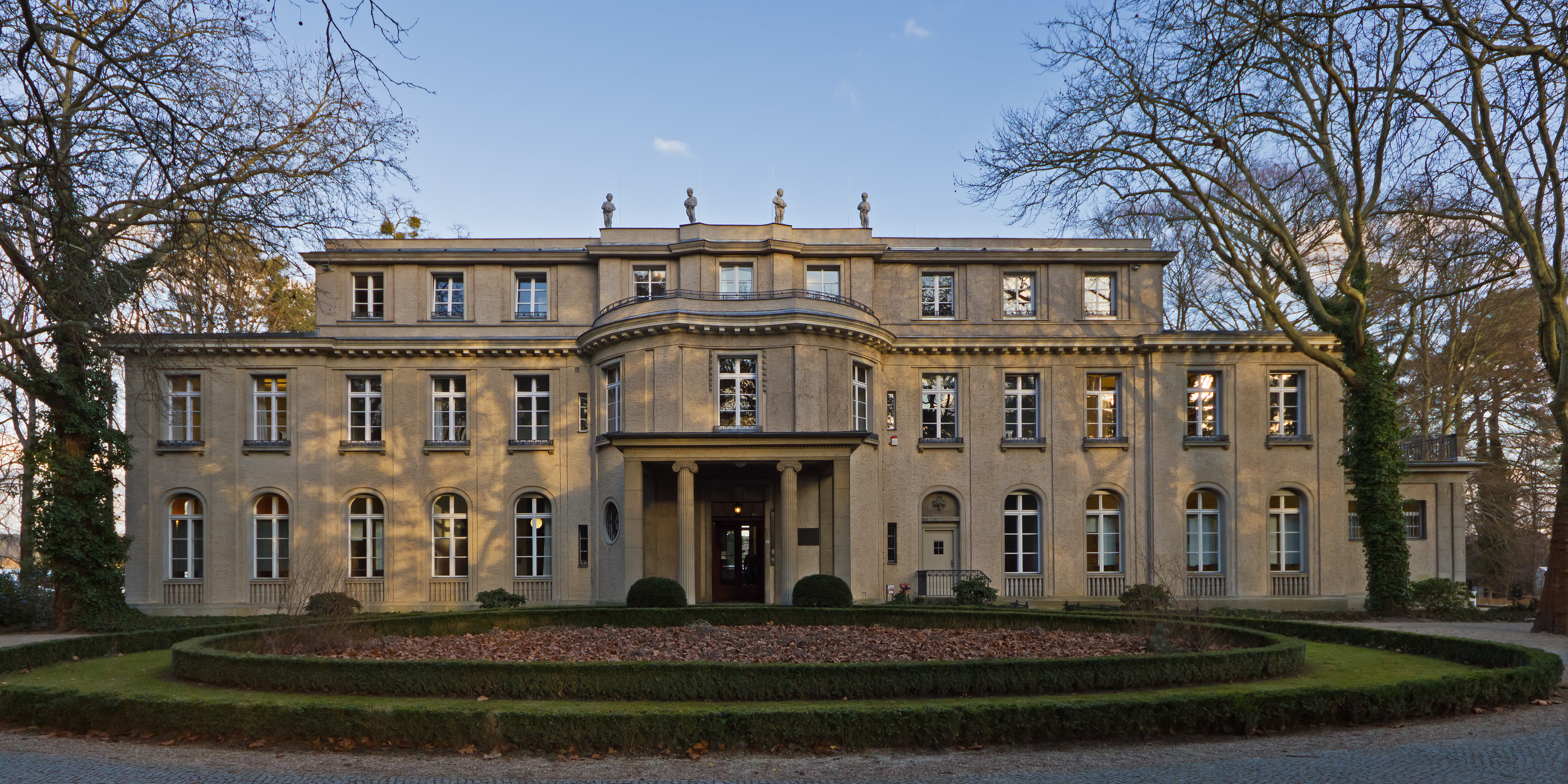
Am Großen Wannsee 56–58, Berlin

In 1965 Wulf proposed that the villa in Berlin in which the 1942 Wannsee Conference was held should be made into a Holocaust memorial and research centre. During the Wannsee Conference, Reinhard Heydrich, chief of the Reich Security Main Office, had outlined to several leading Nazis, in somewhat coded language, the German government's plan to enact the Final Solution. In August 1966 Wulf co-founded, with Friedrich Zipfel and Peter Heilmann, the International Document Center Organization for the Study of National Socialism and Its Aftermath, and began campaigning to have it housed in the Wannsee Conference villa.

Wulf abandoned his efforts in 1971. The German government was not interested in moving forward with the idea at that time. The building was in use as a school, and funding was not available. The issue of the memorial was so politically sensitive in Germany that Wulf apparently needed police protection because of threats. Klaus Schütz, then mayor of West Berlin, said he did not want any "macabre cult site".

However, posthumously, Wulf won out in the creation of such a museum at Wannsee.

=== Death ===
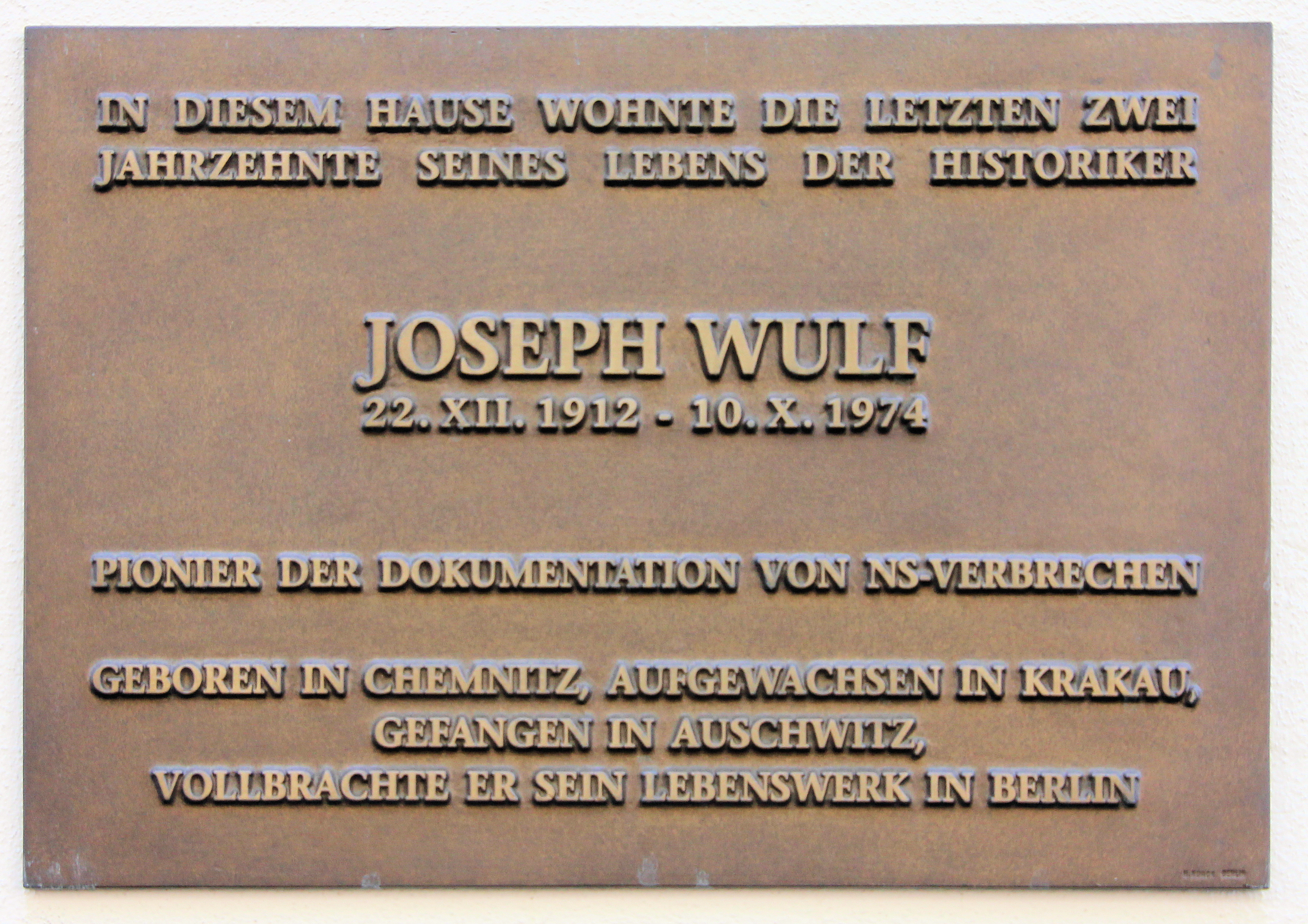
Memorial plaque at Wulf's home in Berlin-Charlottenburg

Wulf committed suicide on 10 October 1974 by jumping from the fifth-floor window of his apartment at Giesebrechtstraße 12, Berlin-Charlottenburg. For three years, he had planned to write a 500-page history of East European Jewry. A publisher's letter accepting his proposal arrived on the day of his death and was found unopened. In his last letter to his son, David, he wrote, "I have published 18 books about the Third Reich and they have had no effect. You can document everything to death for the Germans. There is a democratic regime in Bonn. Yet the mass murderers walk around free, live in their little houses, and grow flowers."

In early 1974, he had written in an open letter, "Appeal to the German intellectual public", intended for submission to Die Zeit, that he did not want to be buried in Germany: "For a conscious Jew living and working in Europe, how you Christians forget what you have done with Jews over two thousand years, how you Germans forget that you have exterminated six million Jews, only becomes clear on Israeli soil. On Israeli soil, all of Europe seems to be in a sort of Orwellian condition."

=== Museum ===
In 1986 the mayor of Berlin, Eberhard Diepgen, announced that a memorial would indeed be built at the Wannsee villa. On 20 January 1992, on the 50th anniversary of the Wannsee Conference, the site was finally opened as a Holocaust memorial and museum. In the dining room where the conference was held, photographs and biographies of the participants hang on the wall. The museum also hosts permanent exhibits of texts and photographs that document events of the Holocaust and its planning. The Joseph Wulf Mediothek on the second floor, a reference library, houses over 65,000 books, 10,000 films, 120 journal subscriptions, and materials such as microfilms and original Nazi documents.

== Selected works ==
- with Léon Poliakov (1955). Das Dritte Reich und die Juden, Berlin: Arani-Verlag.
  - A slightly adapted edition was published in Dutch as Het Derde Rijk en de Joden (1956), Amsterdam.
- with Léon Poliakov (1956). Das Dritte Reich und seine Diener, Berlin: Arani-Verlag.
- with Léon Poliakov (1959). Das Dritte Reich und seine Denker, Berlin: Arani-Verlag.
- (1960). Die Nürnberger Gesetze, Berlin.
- (1960). Heinrich Himmler, Berlin.
- (1961). Das Dritte Reich und seine Vollstrecker. Die Liquidation von 500.000 Juden im Ghetto Warschau, Berlin: Arani-Verlag.
- (1962). Martin Bormann: Hitlers Schatten, Gütersloh.
- (1963). Aus dem Lexikon der Mörder, Gütersloh.
- (1963). Musik im Dritten Reich, Gütersloh.
- (1963). Die bildenden Künste im Dritten Reich, Gütersloh.
- (1963). Literatur und Dichtung im Dritten Reich, Gütersloh.
- (1963). Theater und Film im Dritten Reich, Gütersloh.
- (1964). Presse und Funk im Dritten Reich, Gütersloh.
- (1968). Raoul Wallenberg: Il fut leur espérance, Paris (first published by Colloquium Verlag, Berlin, 1958).

== Sources ==
=== Works cited ===
- Berg, Nicolas (2008). "Joseph Wulf. A Forgotten Outsider Among Holocaust Scholars". In Bankier, David; Michman, Dan (eds.). Holocaust Historiography in Context. Emergence, Challenges, Polemics and Achievements. Jerusalem, New York and Oxford: Yad Vashem and Berghahn Books. pp. 167–206. ISBN 978-965-308-326-4.
- Berg, Nicholas (2015) [2003]. The Holocaust and the West German Historians: Historical Interpretation and Autobiographical Memory. Madison, WI: University of Wisconsin Press. ISBN 978-0-299-30084-5.
- Browning, Christopher R. (2004). The Origins of the Final Solution: The Evolution of Nazi Jewish Policy, September 1939 – March 1942. Lincoln and Jerusalem: University of Nebraska Press and Yad Vashem. ISBN 0-8032-1327-1.
- Lehrer, Steven (2000). Wannsee House and the Holocaust. McFarland. ISBN 978-0-7864-0792-7.
