= Private Schulz =

British TV series

- DVD cover
- Genre: Comedy drama
- Written by: Jack Pulman
- Directed by: Robert Chetwyn
- Starring: Michael Elphick; Ian Richardson; Billie Whitelaw
- Country of origin: United Kingdom
- Original language: English
- No. of series: 1
- No. of episodes: 6

Production
- Producer: Philip Hinchcliffe
- Running time: 50 mins. per episode
- Production company: BBC

Original release
- Network: BBC2
- Release: 6 May – 10 June 1981

Private Schulz is a 1981 six-part BBC television comedy drama serial set mostly in Germany, during and immediately after World War II. It stars Michael Elphick in the title role and Ian Richardson playing various parts. Other notable actors included Tony Caunter, Billie Whitelaw, Billy Murray and Mark Wingett. It was shown on Masterpiece Theatre in the US.

== Plot summary ==
Over six 50-minute episodes, it tells the story of Gerhard Schulz, a German fraudster and petty criminal who is forced against his will to serve in the SS. In a story based on the real, though unrealised, plot by the Germans known as Operation Bernhard, he persuades his superiors to authorise a project to print counterfeit British five pound notes for the purpose of destroying the British economy. Schulz has little interest in the defeat of Britain, and simply wants to steal the forged notes, although he is also strongly motivated to help a former criminal colleague, a Jewish master forger imprisoned in a concentration camp. Other elements of the story based on the history of the period, include the Venlo incident, when two British intelligence officers were abducted from the Netherlands at the start of the war. Salon Kitty was a Berlin brothel, secretly run by the Sicherheitsdienst (the intelligence agency of the SS) to spy on its clientele, who were often prominent German government officials or military officers.

== Production ==
Many of the main characters are based on real people (though some of the characters carry different names). Dialogue in the series is in English and in situations where Schulz interacts with English characters, his delivery is deliberate, like that of a non-native speaker not used to speaking English, or attempting to conceal his native accent. Billie Whitelaw played the role of a prostitute working at Salon Kitty, where German officers were secretly recorded by the SS. Her character claims to have a psychological block that prevents her having sex with any soldier below the rank of major. The screenplay was by Jack Pulman, who died in 1979 before any filming had taken place. In 1982, he was posthumously awarded a writer's award by The Royal Television Society for his work on Private Schulz. Other notable names involved in the show include composer Carl Davis and producer Philip Hinchcliffe.

== Cast ==
- Private Gerhard Schulz – Michael Elphick
- Major Neuheim, Gerald Melfort, Stanley Kemp – Ian Richardson
- Bertha Freya – Billie Whitelaw
- Gertrude Steiner – Rula Lenska
- Iphraim "Solly" Solikoff – Cyril Shaps
- Schumacher – Terence Suffolk
- Professor Bodelschwingh – David Swift
- Herr Krauss – Ken Campbell
- Bus Conductor – Hugh Walters

== Episodes ==
No.	Title	Original release date
1	"Part one"	6 May 1981
Schulz is released from prison and is drafted into the SS Counter-Espionage division, under Major Neuheim. His first assignment is eavesdropping on clients at the Salon Kitty brothel where he meets Bertha, the madam of the establishment. Schulz recommends to Neuheim the forging of British five pound notes. He is tasked with assembling a group of forgers.
2	"Part two"	13 May 1981
The initial difficulties of forging the five pound notes is overcome, the last hurdle due to Schulz blackmailing Professor Bodelschwingh to solve the serial numbering sequence. After stealing some of the money to use at Salon Kitty and to impress Bertha, Schulz is discovered by Neuheim and must either face a firing squad, or parachute into Britain in an attempt to distribute two million pounds of forged currency.
3	"Part three"	20 May 1981
After landing in Britain, Schulz buries most of the money, using a milestone as a landmark. While trying to blend in among the populace, his behavior arouses suspicion amongst the villagers, and he escapes to make contact with the Nazi agent Melfort. He discovers Melfort is controlled by the British and runs to the coast, crossing the Channel to arrive at the Dunkirk evacuation. He eventually enters a deserted Chateau, where he is double-crossed by a countess, then captured by the German army.
4	"Part four"	27 May 1981
Schulz is returned to his post with Neuheim where he suggests using the forged money to pay German agents and buy treasures from occupied countries. He then plans to steal a shipment of the money. After his first plan fails, he attempts again with Neuheim's secretary, Gertrude Steiner, as his accomplice. He is once again double-crossed, captured, and sent to a labour camp for three years.
5	"Part five"	3 June 1981
It is now late 1944 and war is going poorly for Germany. The forging operation is moved by Neuheim to the labour camp Schulz is in. He maneuvers to once again be posted to act as Neuheim's clerk. As a last ditch effort Neuheim puts Schulz in charge of taking the forged money and equipment to the Alps for safety. With the help of the other forgers, Schulz dumps the equipment and money in a lake, but is then caught by an American patrol. Now penniless in late 1945, he is found by Neuheim and forced to retrieve the money from the lake. The plan quickly falls apart.
6	"Part six"	10 June 1981
Once again, Schulz is penniless and a released convict. He accidentally discovers he still has the map showing the location of the buried money in Britain. He travels back and recruits Stan, a local criminal, to help him dig for it beneath the public lavatory built over the spot. They recover the money, but Stan and his gang try to double-cross Schulz. He manages to escape with the canister of money and is pursued by Stan, only to have the booby-trapped canister to explode and destroy all the money. He later meets Bertha and after they realize they are both poor and homeless, they agree to settle down together.

== Reception ==
Michael Elphick's performance was praised in a 1983 review in The New York Times and noted the script by the late Jack Pulman "manages to be almost wickedly clever as it hones in on the foibles of not only the Germans but also of the British."

== Novelisation ==
Concurrent with the airing of the miniseries, New English Library issued a prose adaptation of Pulman's scripts by career novelizer Martin Noble, under the title Jack Pulman's Private Schulz.
