= Aleksandra Bystroń-Kołodziejczyk =

Polish World War II resistance worker

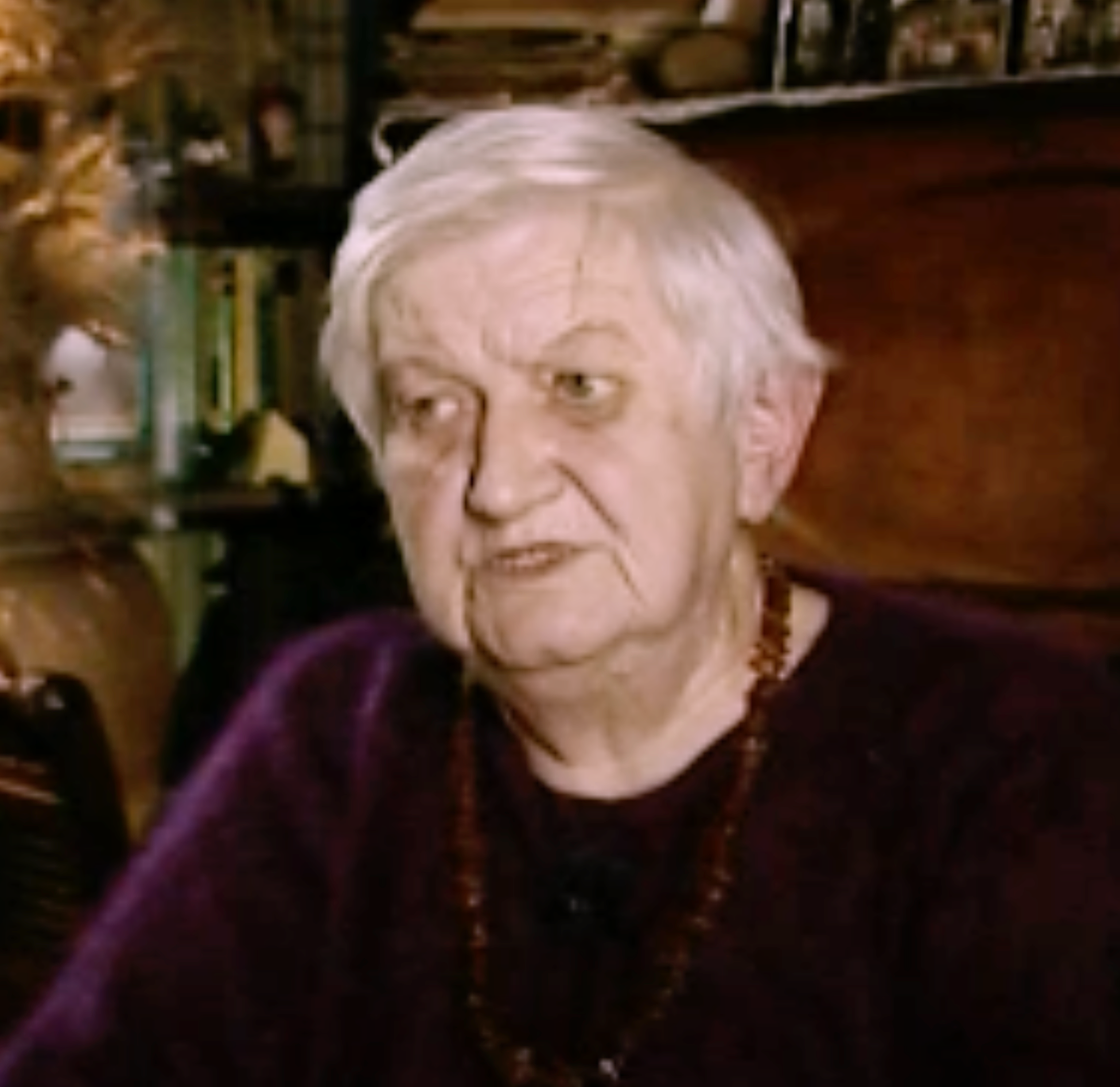
- Aleksandra Bystroń-Kołodziejczyk in 2005
- Born: Aleksandra Bystroń; 26 July 1927; Brzeszcze, Poland
- Died: 16 September 2016 (aged 89)
- Occupation: Polish resistance worker

Aleksandra Bystroń-Kołodziejczyk (26 July 1927 – 16 September 2016) was a Polish World War II resistance worker and witness to the Holocaust.

As a young girl, she left food for prisoners in the Auschwitz concentration camp. She later joined the Union of Armed Struggle (ZWZ-AK) resistance group, and carried messages for them.

== Biography ==
She was born Aleksandra Bystroń in 1927 in Brzeszcze, Poland, near the city of Oświęcim (called Auschwitz by the German invaders). Her father worked as a surveyor in the mining industry.

In April 1940, following the invasion of Poland, the Nazis imprisoned her father in the concentration camp system. Together with her friends, she contacted the prisoners in the camp, and arranged to provide them with supplies.

In 1941, she joined the Home Army, then known as the Union of Armed Struggle, with the title of liaison officer. Working with them, she helped pass messages to and from the prisoners.

From 1943, she was forced by the Nazis to work in the Brzeszcze-Jawischowitz mine. During the time, she continued to aid prisoners by any means she could.

She remained in her home town after the war. Her career prospects were limited by the new Communist government, because of her involvement in the Home Army.

== Depiction in film ==
She features as a character in Jonathan Glazer's film The Zone of Interest, in which she is shown leaving food for concentration camp prisoners in the night.

The house used as a set in the film was the house she had lived in, and the bicycle and dress in the film were her own.

The night scenes in which her character appears were shot using a high-resolution military thermographic camera, making her character glow in the darkness. In his Oscar acceptance speech, Glazer dedicated the film to her, describing her as "the girl who glows in the film as she did in life".
