= The Zone of Interest (film) =

2023 film by Jonathan Glazer

- US theatrical release poster
- Directed by: Jonathan Glazer
- Written by: Jonathan Glazer
- Based on: The Zone of Interest by Martin Amis
- Produced by: James Wilson; Ewa Puszczyńska
- Starring: Christian Friedel; Sandra Hüller
- Cinematography: Łukasz Żal
- Edited by: Paul Watts
- Music by: Mica Levi
- Production companies: JW Films; Extreme Emotions; Film4; Access Entertainment; Polish Film Institute
- Distributed by: A24 (United Kingdom and United States); Gutek Film (Poland)
- Release dates: 19 May 2023 (Cannes); 15 December 2023 (United States); 2 February 2024 (United Kingdom); 9 February 2024 (Poland)
- Running time: 105 minutes
- Countries: United Kingdom; Poland; United States
- Languages: German; Polish; Yiddish
- Box office: $52.8 million

The Zone of Interest is a 2023 historical drama film written and directed by Jonathan Glazer. Loosely based on the 2014 novel by Martin Amis, the film concerns the life of German Auschwitz commandant Rudolf Höss and his wife Hedwig, who live with their family in a home in the "Zone of Interest" next to the Auschwitz concentration camp. Christian Friedel stars as Rudolf Höss alongside Sandra Hüller as Hedwig Höss.

Development began in 2014 around the publication of the Amis novel, which was partially based on real events. Glazer opted to tell the story of the real Hösses rather than the characters they inspired and conducted extensive research into the family, as he sought to demystify the perpetrators of the Holocaust as "mythologically evil". The project was formally announced in 2019, with A24 confirmed to distribute. Filming took place primarily around Auschwitz in mid-2021. Additional filming took place in Jelenia Góra in January 2022.

The Zone of Interest premiered at the 76th Cannes Film Festival on 19 May 2023 and was theatrically released in the United States on 15 December 2023, receiving acclaim and grossing over $52 million. It received five nominations (including Best Picture) at the 96th Academy Awards, winning Best International Feature (the first for a non-English British film) and Best Sound; won the Grand Prix at Cannes and three British Academy Film Awards, becoming the first film to win both Best Film Not in the English Language and Outstanding British Film; received three nominations at the Golden Globe Awards; and was named one of the top five international films of 2023 by the National Board of Review. It has been regarded as one of the greatest films of the 2020s and the 21st century.

== Plot ==
In 1943, Rudolf Höss, commandant of the German Nazi Auschwitz concentration camp, lives with his wife Hedwig and their five children in an idyllic home next to the camp. Höss takes the children out to swim and fish, and Hedwig spends time tending the garden. Non-Jewish inmates handle the chores, and the murdered Jews' best belongings are given to the family. Beyond the garden wall, gunshots, screaming, and the sounds of trains and furnaces are often audible.

Höss approves the design of a new crematorium created by Topf and Sons. One day, he notices human remains in the river and gets his children out of the water where they have been playing. On another day, he chastises SS personnel for damaging lilac bushes around the camp, heavily implied to be related to the sexual abuse of prisoners. At night, while Höss reads the German fairytale of "Hansel and Gretel" to his daughters, a Polish girl sneaks out and hides food at the prisoners' work sites.

Hedwig's mother comes to stay, and is impressed and pleased by the material status her daughter has achieved. Höss receives word that he is being promoted to deputy inspector of concentration camps and must move to Oranienburg, near Berlin. He objects, and withholds the news from Hedwig for several days. Hedwig asks him to convince his superiors to let her and the children remain in their home; the request is approved. Before Höss leaves, a woman comes to his office and prepares herself for sex. Höss is shown washing his genitals. Meanwhile, the Polish girl finds sheet music composed by a prisoner, which she plays on the piano at her home. Hedwig's mother departs unannounced after seeing and smelling the burning crematoria at night. She leaves a note that upsets Hedwig, causing Hedwig to lash out and threaten her servants.

In Oranienburg, in recognition of Höss's work, Oswald Pohl tells Höss he will be heading Aktion Höss, which will transport 700,000 Hungarian Jews to his camp to be killed or enslaved. This will allow him to move back to Auschwitz and rejoin his family. Höss vacantly attends a party organised by the SS Main Economic and Administrative Office. Afterwards, he tells Hedwig over the phone that he spent his time at the party thinking about the most efficient way to gas the attendees.

As Höss leaves his Oranienburg office and descends a stairway, he stops, retches repeatedly and stares into the darkness of the building corridors. In the present day, a group of janitors clean the Auschwitz-Birkenau State Museum. Back in 1944, Höss continues downstairs, descending into darkness.

== Cast ==
- Christian Friedel as Rudolf Höss
- Sandra Hüller as Hedwig Höss
- Johann Karthaus as Klaus Höss
- Luis Noah Witte as Hans Höss
- Nele Ahrensmeier as Inge-Brigit Höss
- Lilli Falk as Heidetraut Höss
- Anastazja Drobniak, Cecylia Pekala and Kalman Wilson as Annegret Höss
- Medusa Knopf as Elfryda
- Maximilian Beck as Schwarzer
- Andrey Isaev as Bronek
- Stephanie Petrowitz as Sophie
- Martyna Poznanski as Marta
- Zuzanna Kobiela as Aniela
- Marie Rosa Tietjen as Hedwig's friend
- Imogen Kogge as Hedwig's mother
- Ralph Herforth as Oswald Pohl
- Daniel Holzberg as Gerhard Maurer
- Freya Kreutzkam as Eleonore Pohl
- Sascha Maaz as Arthur Liebehenschel
- Julia Polaczek as Aleksandra Bystroń-Kołodziejczyk
- Wolfgang Lampl as Hans Burger

== Production ==
The film is a British–Polish–US production.

=== Development ===
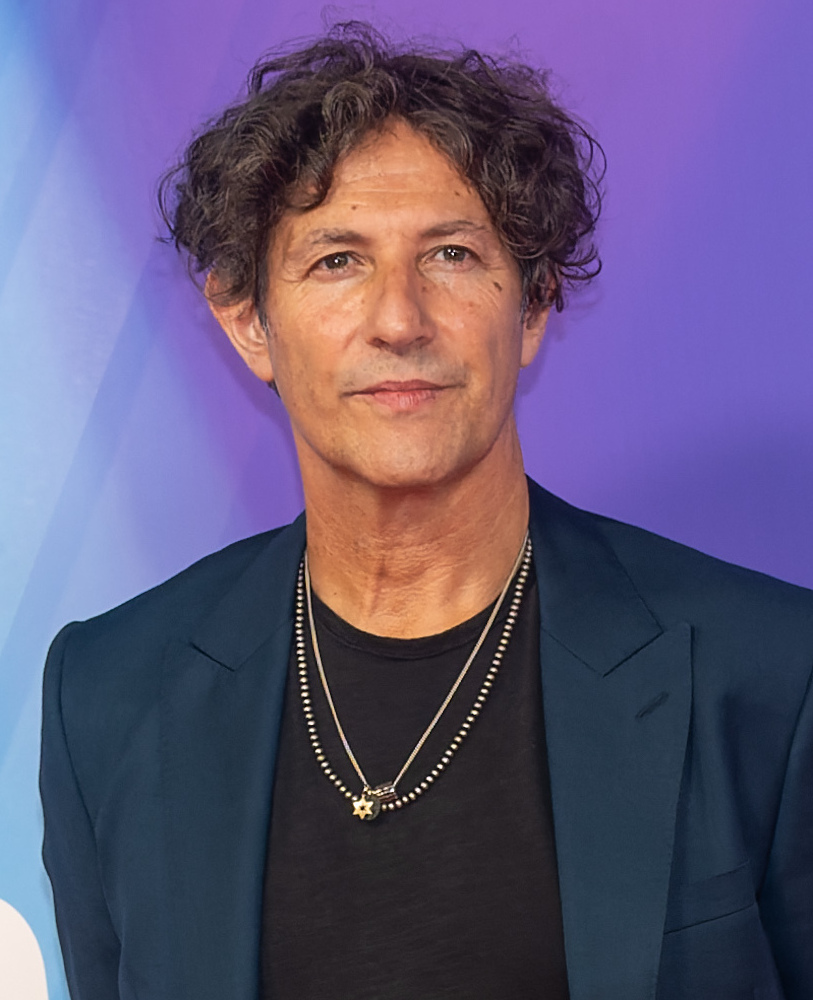
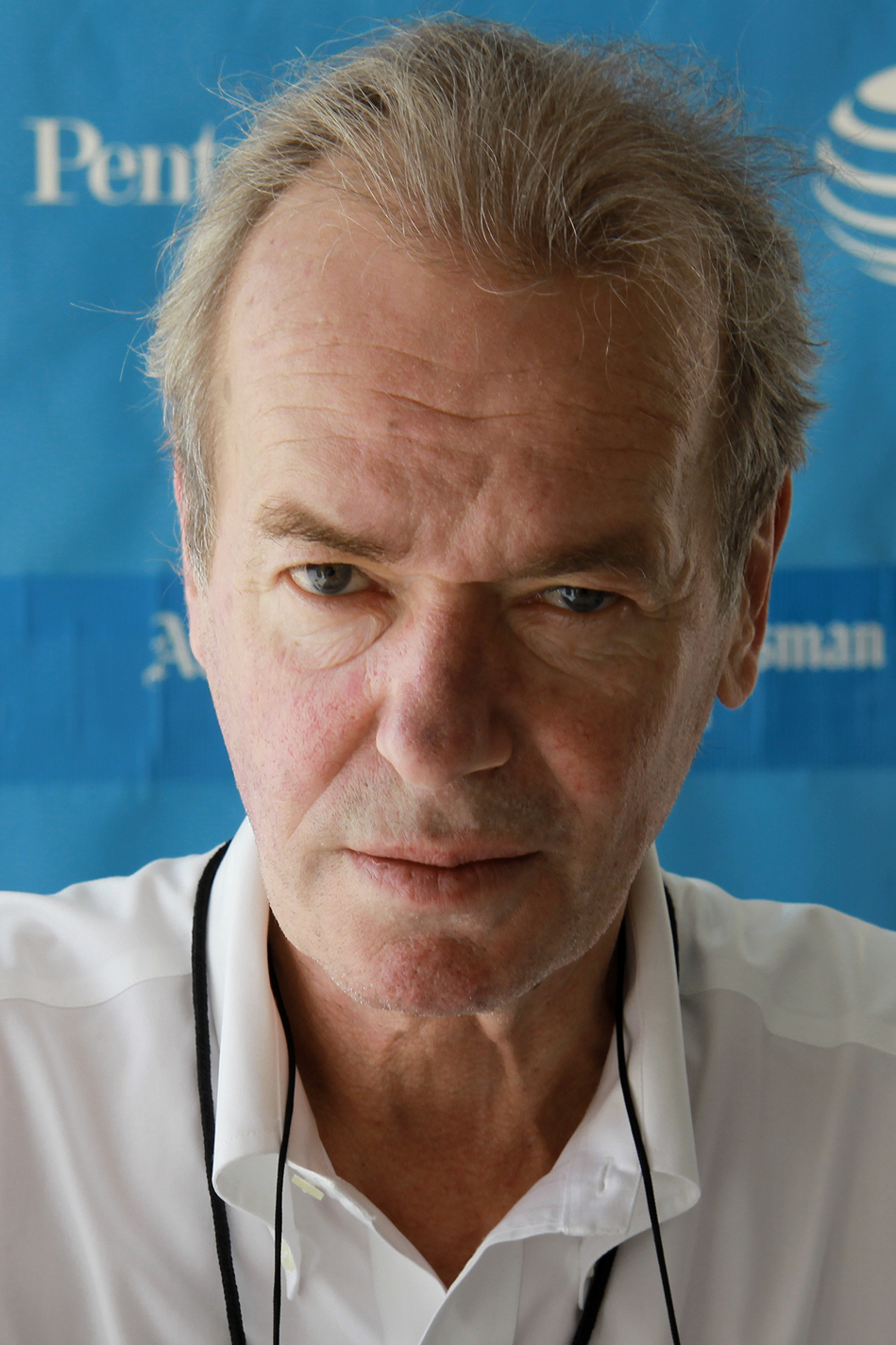
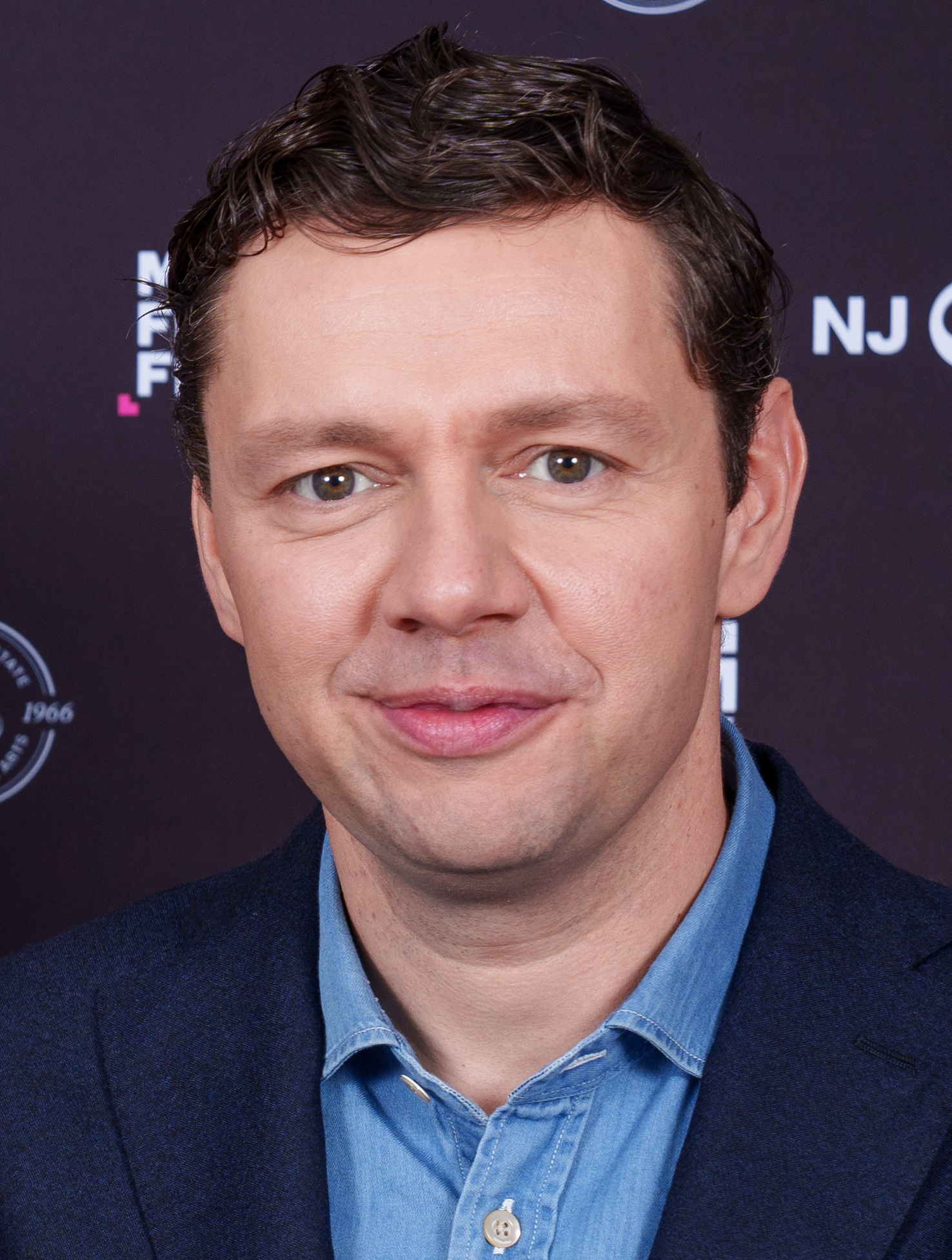
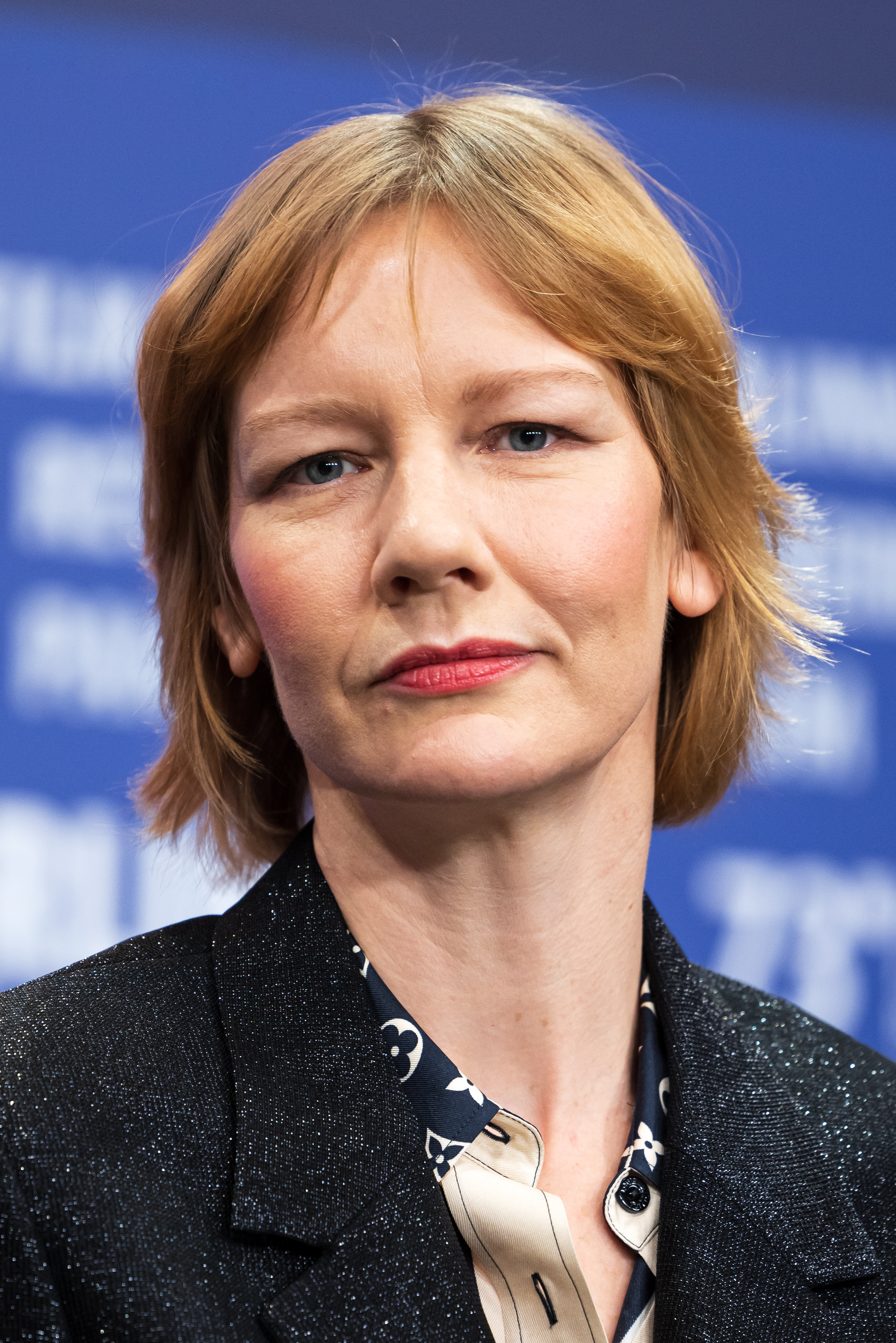
Clockwise: writer-director Jonathan Glazer, novelist Martin Amis, and actors Sandra Hüller and Christian Friedel

Development of The Zone of Interest began in 2014. After completing Under the Skin, Jonathan Glazer came across a newspaper preview of the then-upcoming Martin Amis novel The Zone of Interest and became intrigued. He optioned the novel after reading it. Paul and Hannah Doll, the novel's two main characters, were loosely based on Rudolf Höss, the longest-serving German commandant of Auschwitz concentration camp, and his wife Hedwig. Glazer opted to use the historical figures instead and conducted two years of extensive research into the Hösses. He made several visits to Auschwitz and was profoundly affected by the sight of the Höss residence, which was separated from the camp by a mere garden wall. He collaborated with the Auschwitz Museum and other organisations, and obtained special permission to access the archives, where he examined testimonies provided by survivors and individuals who had been employed in the Höss household. By piecing together these testimonies, Glazer gradually constructed a detailed portrayal of the individuals connected to the events. He also consulted historian Timothy Snyder's 2015 book Black Earth: The Holocaust as History and Warning during his research.

Glazer wished to make a film that demystifies the perpetrators of the Holocaust, which he noted are often portrayed as "almost mythologically evil". He sought to tell the story of the Holocaust not "as something safely in the past", but "a story of the here and now". He compared his approach to the writing of philosopher Gillian Rose, who envisioned a film "that could make us feel 'unsafe', by showing how we're emotionally and politically closer to the perpetrator culture than we'd like to think" and a film seen through the "dry eyes of grief" that is unsentimental and "forensic".

Glazer confirmed development of the project in 2019, with A24, Film4, Access Entertainment and House Productions co-financing and producing. Christian Friedel first met Glazer and producer James Wilson in London in 2019 for the role of Rudolf Höss. Despite his own unwillingness to play Nazi figures, he was intrigued by Glazer's approach, which aimed to "give this monstrous person a human face".

Friedel recommended Hüller for the role of Rudolf's wife Hedwig, having first met her in 2013 while acting together in the historical drama Amour Fou. Hüller was first sent an excerpt of the script, an argument between Rudolf and Hedwig presented out of context, before learning the project's nature as a film about the Holocaust. Although she had resolved never to play a Nazi, Hüller was convinced after reading the full script and meeting with Glazer, believing that he shared and addressed her concerns about how to properly depict Nazism on screen. Hüller's own dog, a black Weimaraner, plays Dilla, the Höss family dog in the film.

The young Polish girl in the film is inspired by Aleksandra Bystroń-Kołodziejczyk, whom Glazer met during his research. As a 16-year-old member of the Polish Home Army, she used to cycle to the camp to leave apples for the starving prisoners. As in the film, she discovered a piece of music written by a prisoner. The prisoner, Joseph Wulf, worked at Auschwitz III–Monowitz. He survived the camp and was one of the first people to document the atrocities of the Holocaust, a cause to which he dedicated his life. Bystroń-Kołodziejczyk died shortly after she met Glazer. The bike the film uses and the dress the actress wears both belonged to her. Glazer dedicated the film to her while accepting the award for Best International Feature Film at the 96th Academy Awards.

The film's final scene, in which Höss retches repeatedly while walking down a flight of stairs, was inspired by the ending of the 2012 documentary The Act of Killing by Joshua Oppenheimer. In that film, Anwar Congo, a gangster and former far-right paramilitary enforcer, retches repeatedly while visiting the scene of several of his murders.

=== Filming ===
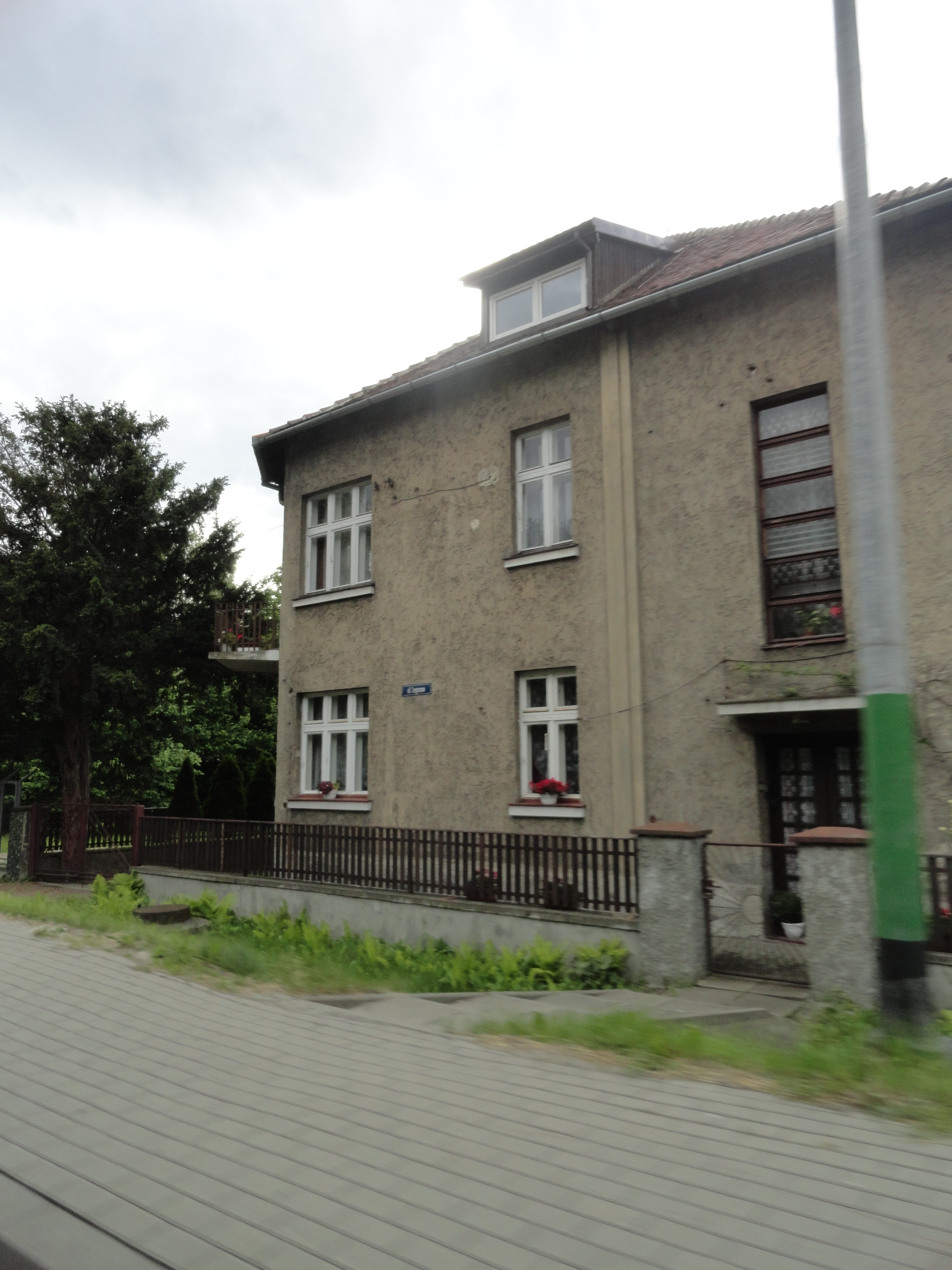
Front façade of the former house of Rudolf Höß next to the Auschwitz concentration camp (2012)

The original Höss house has been a private residence since the end of the war. Wear and tear in the subsequent eight decades made it a poor location for the shoot, which required the house to appear brand new. Production designer Chris Oddy ultimately chose a derelict building a few hundred yards away, built after the war but in a similar architectural style. He spent several months converting the home into a replica of the Höss residence, and started planting the garden in April 2021 so that it would be in bloom when filming began. As the camp buildings have aged significantly over the years, they were recreated through the use of computer-generated graphics. Principal photography began around Auschwitz in summer 2021 and lasted approximately 55 days. Additional filming took place in January 2022 in Jelenia Góra and at Książ Castle.

The film was shot on Sony Venice digital cameras equipped with Leica lenses. Glazer and cinematographer Łukasz Żal embedded up to 10 cameras in and around the house and kept them running simultaneously, with no crew on set. Żal and his team were stationed in the basement, while Glazer and the rest of the crew were in a container on the other side of the wall, away from the actors. Each take would last 10 minutes. The approach, which Glazer dubbed "Big Brother in the Nazi house", allowed the actors to improvise and experiment extensively during filming. Glazer and Żal aimed for a modern look and did not wish to "aesthetize" Auschwitz. As a result, only practical and natural lighting was used. The nighttime sequences involving the Polish girl, where there was no natural light available, were shot using a thermal imaging camera provided by the Polish military. The low-resolution thermal imagery was then upscaled using AI during post-production.

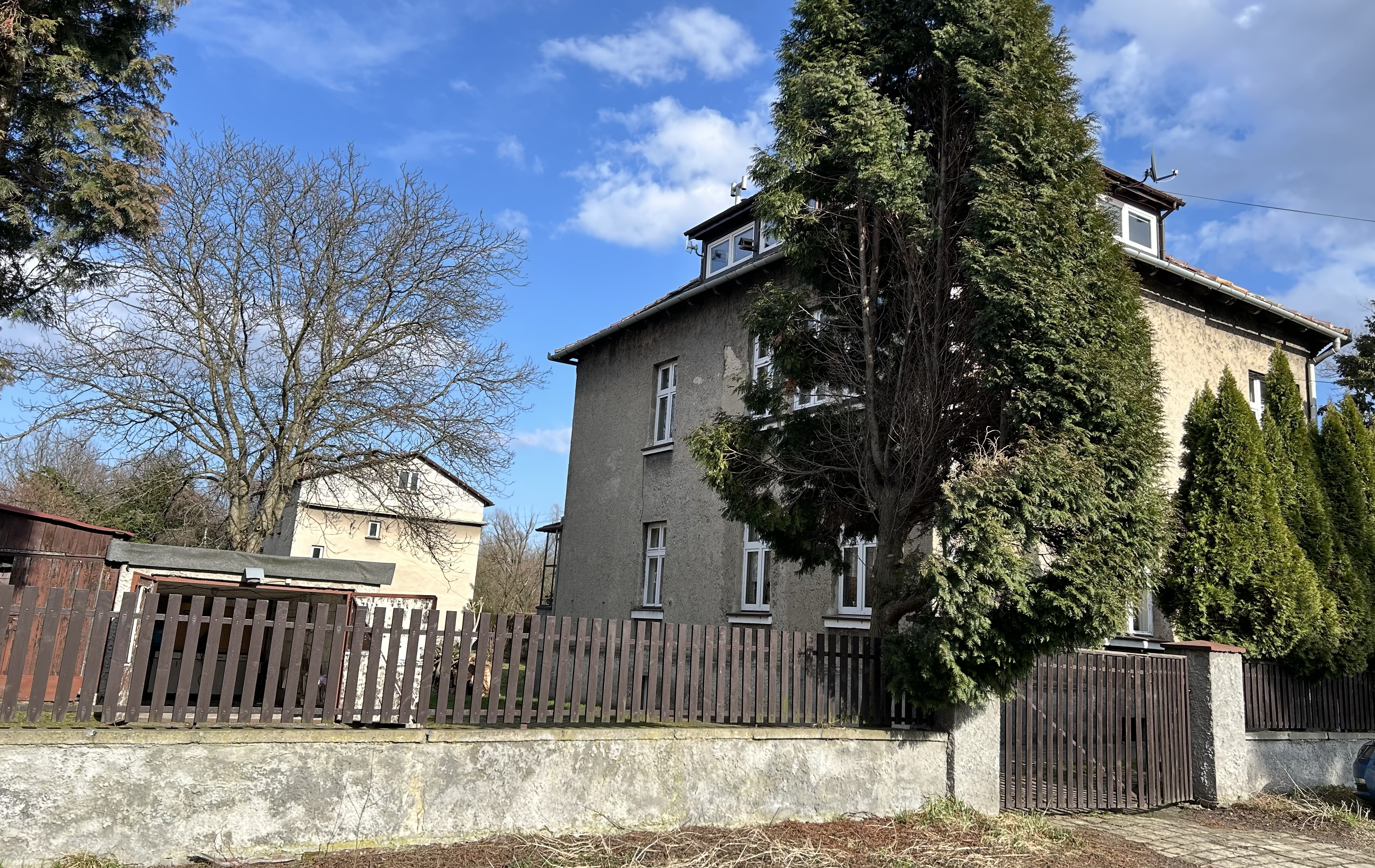
Former house of Rudolf Höß, showing side entrance giving onto the gate leading to the camp (2024)

Glazer did not want the atrocities occurring inside the camp to be seen, only heard. He described the film's sound as "the other film" and "arguably, the film". To that end, sound designer Johnnie Burn compiled a 600-page document containing relevant events at Auschwitz, testimonies from witnesses, and a large map of the camp so that the distance and echoes of the sounds could be properly determined. He spent a year building a sound library before filming began, which included sounds of manufacturing machinery, crematoria, furnaces, boots, period-accurate gunfire and human sounds of pain. He continued building the library well into the shoot and post-production. As many of the new arrivals at Auschwitz at the time were French, Burn sourced their voices from protests and riots in Paris in 2022. The sounds of drunken Auschwitz guards were sourced at the Reeperbahn in Hamburg.

English musician Mica Levi started working on the score as early as 2016, and later spent a year in the studio alongside Glazer and editor Paul Watts. "No stone was left unturned" said Levi in a Sight and Sound interview, as the team explored every possible avenue for how music could work in the film. "It couldn't just work on a subliminal level", Levi said, "it had to be technical rather than emotive." In the end Levi wrote dense and "formally inventive", vocal-based compositions accompanied by a pitch black screen for the prologue and the epilogue, plus soundscapes created for the sequences involving the Polish girl and montages of garden flowers. The compositions combine human voices with a synthesizer, which Levi described as a pairing of "the oldest, most primordial instrument" with "the most modern".

== Release ==
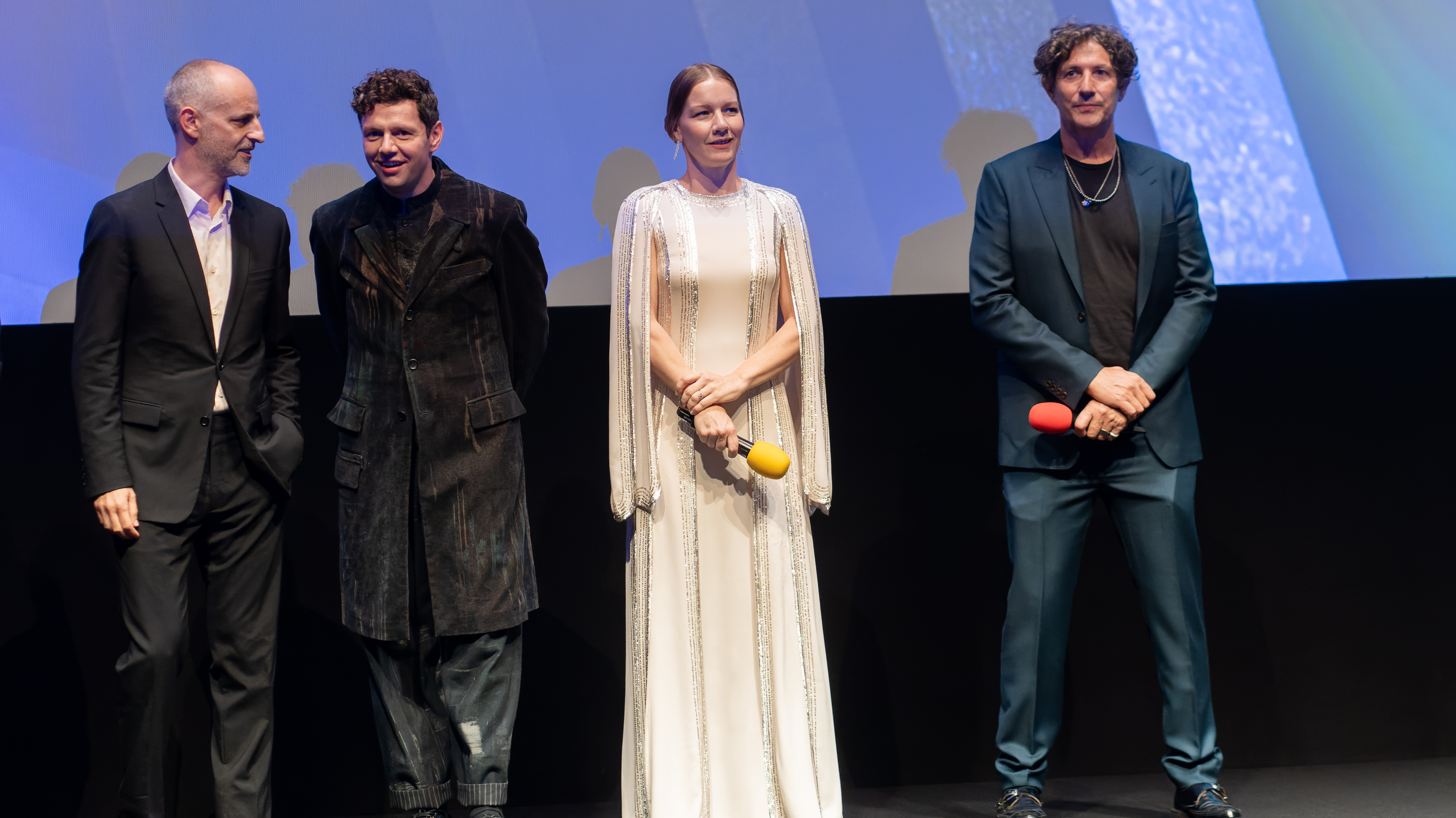
The cast and team at the film's Gala Premiere at the 2023 BFI London Film Festival

The Zone of Interest was selected to compete for the Palme d'Or at the 2023 Cannes Film Festival, where it had its world premiere on 19 May, and received a six-minute standing ovation. It won the Grand Prix, the Cannes Soundtrack Award, and the FIPRESCI Prize. The North American premiere was held on 1 September 2023, at the 50th Telluride Film Festival. The Zone of Interest was also screened at the 2023 Toronto International Film Festival.

In the US, after being delayed from its initial release date of 8 December 2023, The Zone of Interest had a limited theatrical release on 15 December. Distribution was by A24. It was released in the UK on 2 February 2024, and released in Poland a week later on 9 February. It was distributed by Gutek Film in Poland.

It was released for digital platforms on 20 February 2024.

== Reception ==
=== Box office ===
As of March 25, 2024, The Zone of Interest had grossed $8.6 million in the United States and Canada, and $43.4 million in other territories, for a total worldwide gross of $52 million.

In its opening weekend in the United States, the film made $124,000 from four theatres. Following its five Oscar nominations, it expanded from 215 theatres to 333 in its seventh week of release and made $1.08 million, an increase of 141% from the previous weekend, and a running total of $3 million.

=== Critical response ===
The Zone of Interest premiered to critical acclaim. (Note: Attributed to multiple references:) On the review aggregator website Rotten Tomatoes, 93% of 356 reviews are positive, with an average rating of 9.0/10. The website's critics consensus states, "Dispassionately examining the ordinary existence of people complicit in horrific crimes, The Zone of Interest forces us to take a cold look at the mundanity behind an unforgivable brutality." On Metacritic, the film has a weighted average score of 92 out of 100, based on 58 critic reviews, indicating "universal acclaim".

Kevin Maher of The Times called it a "landmark movie, hugely important, that's unafraid of difficult ideas". David Rooney of The Hollywood Reporter called it a "devastating Holocaust drama like no other, which demonstrates with startling effectiveness [director Jonathan Glazer]'s unerring control of tonal and visual storytelling". Donald Clarke of The Irish Times wrote, "Glazer may yet get in some trouble for taking such a formal approach to sensitive material. But, if anything, that self-imposed discipline – and utter lack of sentimentality – speaks to the profound respect he has for the subject." Raphael Abraham of the Financial Times wrote, "Glazer has achieved something much greater than just making the monstrous mundane – by rendering such extreme inhumanity ordinary he reawakens us to its true horror." Jonathan Romney of Screen International wrote that the film "eschews false rhetoric, leaving maximum space for the audience's imaginative and emotional response".

David Ehrlich of IndieWire praised Glazer's camera process for instilling "a flattening evenness into a film where the lack of drama becomes deeply sickening unto itself". Robbie Collin of The Daily Telegraph wrote, "Through painstaking framing and sound design, its horrors gnaw at the edge of every shot." In a four-star review, Peter Bradshaw of The Guardian called it "a film which for all its artistry is perhaps not entirely in control of its (intentional) bad taste", while also praising the "superb score by Mica Levi and sound design by Johnnie Burn".

Writing for Worldcrunch, the German critic Hanns-Georg Rodek wrote that the film "concentrates in one garden the attitude of an entire nation that wanted to know nothing." Conversely, the Italian film critic Davide Abbatescianni's review published by Cineuropa was less positive. He criticised the film for its disturbing atmosphere, which he found to be well-crafted but monotonous, and for the performances, which he felt could not bring any change to the concept presented in a film that he thought lacked variety and remained stagnant for two hours. Among the other rare negative reviews, Cahiers du Cinéma found, "The problem is not only the weakness of (the film's) formal lurches, which are much more derisory than those of Under The Skin, and remain here at the stage of mannerisms (why dispense them in such a furtive manner, if not to frustrate needlessly?). It's also that this fantastic idea of off-camera poisoning the frame without ever showing the forbidden image ends up running empty and looking at itself."

The Irish Times commented that German reviews were generally less favorable than English language reviews. Writing for the Frankfurter Allgemeine Zeitung, however, Andreas Klib stated that "Here the camera repeatedly jumps over the axis between the characters – a deadly sin in illusion cinema – to show the back of the event. Because we are not supposed to take part in it, but rather pay attention to details: the clouds of steam from a locomotive on the horizon. The smoke rising from the crematorium into the evening air. The reddish glow of the night sky. The ash that fertilizes the rose beds. At Cannes, where The Zone of Interest won the Grand Jury Prize, some critics criticized the film for its lack of storytelling. But that's exactly the point of Glazer's film: it doesn't paint a story, but a world."

Sight and Sound put the film at 2 and 14 on their lists of the best 50 movies of 2023 and 2024, respectively. In June 2025, IndieWire ranked the film at number 2 on its list of "The 100 Best Movies of the 2020s (So Far)." It also ranked number 12 on The New York Times' list of "The 100 Best Movies of the 21st Century" and number 56 on the "Readers' Choice" edition of the list. In July 2025, it ranked number 77 on Rolling Stone's list of "The 100 Best Movies of the 21st Century."

=== Additional reactions ===
The film was publicly praised by many filmmakers, including Steven Spielberg who said The Zone of Interest was the best film about the Holocaust since his film Schindler's List (1993), "It's doing a lot of good work in raising awareness, especially about the banality of evil." Alfonso Cuarón described The Zone of Interest as "probably the most important film in this century." Other filmmakers who praised the film include Allison Anders, Robert Eggers, Reinaldo Marcus Green, Bill Hader, Andrew Haigh, Chad Hartigan, Don Hertzfeldt, Zoe Lister-Jones, Karyn Kusama, Rachel Morrison, James Ponsoldt, Jonathan Vinel and Adam Wingard.

In a Variety essay expressing his admiration for the film Todd Field wrote:

"For those familiar with Glazer's films it's no surprise his approach here is unencumbered by tropes, genre conceits, or the cinematic shorthand we often take for granted. Over his twenty-four-year career as one of our finest filmmakers, Glazer has consistently executed high-wire interpretations of genre, and in the process completely reinvented them: crime (Sexy Beast), the paranormal (Birth), science fiction (Under the Skin). His pictures within these frames are mind-blowingly unique, as if he'd never seen anything that had been done before. The Zone of Interest is just as enigmatic and urgent. For we live in a time fraught with all kinds of walls used to ghettoize the other. A paradise from which it feels harder and harder to escape. Glazer's art drives us to a place where we have no choice but to try."

Upon its release in Japan on 24 May 2024, video game designer Hideo Kojima hailed the work, "The sounds that plead to the audience through the wall and the torture of deliberately not showing anything at all are used to draw images from the audience's minds. The film tests your 'zone of interest' and paradoxically questions the present's fading memory of the Holocaust."

== Gaza war ==
Several authors, including Ghassan Hage and Naomi Klein, have written about how watching the film made them think of Gaza. Hage wrote: "this is all of us now in the shadow of the mass murders committed in Gaza, living in cultures that have banalized evil". Juliet Jacques wrote that: "In the age of the internet, we are all the Höss family". Haaretz journalist Gideon Levy characterized a wellness spa built for IDF troops in Gaza as a "Zone of Interest". Another Haaretz writer, David Issacharoff, opined that mainstream Israeli media and West Bank settlements create a "Zone of Interest" through the under-coverage of Gaza's humanitarian crisis and a suburban-style detachment from the occupation. He argued this framing excludes the peace-seeking residents living near the Gaza border who were killed in the October 7 attacks, as they actively acknowledged Palestinian humanity and sought reconciliation. The phrase "Zone of Interest" has also been mentioned in viral social media posts, including a photo of Israeli soldiers taking a selfie in Gaza, and a photo of sunflowers in Israel with destroyed Gazan buildings in the background.

=== Oscars acceptance speech ===
The film's theatrical release in December 2023 came during the escalating destruction caused by the Israeli invasion of the Gaza Strip. In his Oscar acceptance speech at the 96th Academy Awards in March 2024, Glazer said that The Zone of Interest shows where dehumanisation leads at its worst. He expressed criticism, as a Jewish person, both of the dehumanisation of "the victims of October the 7th in Israel" and of "the ongoing attack on Gaza", and told the audience: "Right now, we stand here as men who refute [sic] their Jewishness and the Holocaust being hijacked by an occupation which has led to conflict for so many innocent people."

Glazer's speech led to a significant reaction in the news media, especially after a widely circulated quotation truncated his remarks, suggesting that Glazer had simply refuted his Jewish identity, rather than refuting said identity "being hijacked by an occupation". Producer James Wilson said at the British Academy Film Awards: "I had a friend that texted me the other day. He said he couldn't stop thinking about the walls we build in our daily lives that we don't choose... There's obviously things going on in the world, in Gaza, that remind us starkly of the sort of selective empathy, that there seems to be groups of innocent people being killed that we care about less than other innocent people."

On 15 March, Hungarian filmmaker László Nemes, who previously made the Oscar winning Son of Saul, made a public statement with The Guardian denouncing the speech, claiming the filmmaker "should have stayed silent instead of revealing he has no understanding of history and the forces undoing civilization, before or after the Holocaust..." and accused him of resorting to "talking points disseminated by propaganda meant to eradicate, at the end, all Jewish presence from the Earth." On 18 March, an open letter denouncing the speech as blood libel was signed by more than 1,000 "Jewish creatives, executives, and Hollywood professionals", including Amy Pascal, Jennifer Jason Leigh, Julianna Margulies, Debra Messing, Eli Roth, Michael Rapaport, Tara Strong, and Mark Pellegrino. The Intercept reported that the open letter was "extraordinary in the sheer extent of its denialism" of Israeli war crimes in the Gaza war, and characterized its signatories as "engaging in no less than a bullying campaign, leveraging their Jewishness specifically against his, in their numbers, to make baseless and extreme claims".

On 5 April, a second open letter defending Glazer was signed by over 150 Jewish creatives in the film industry. Eventually, over 450 Jewish creatives signed the letter, including Sarah Sherman, Alex Winter, Joel Coen, Todd Haynes, Joaquin Phoenix, Elliott Gould, and Wallace Shawn; the film's composer, Mica Levi, was also a signatory. The playwrights Tony Kushner and Zoe Kazan were among the speech's earlier supporters. That month, Glazer donated seven signed Zone of Interest posters to a Medical Aid for Palestinians fundraiser.

== Accolades ==
Award	Date of ceremony	Category	Recipient(s)	Result	Ref.
AARP Movies for Grownups Awards	17 January 2024	Best Foreign Language Film	The Zone of Interest	Won	
Academy Awards	10 March 2024	Best Picture	James Wilson	Nominated	
Academy Awards	10 March 2024	Best Director	Jonathan Glazer	Nominated	
Academy Awards	10 March 2024	Best Adapted Screenplay	Jonathan Glazer	Nominated	
Academy Awards	10 March 2024	Best International Feature Film	United Kingdom	Won	
Academy Awards	10 March 2024	Best Sound	Tarn Willers and Johnnie Burn	Won	
Alliance of Women Film Journalists	4 January 2024	Best Film	The Zone of Interest	Won	
Alliance of Women Film Journalists	4 January 2024	Best Director	Jonathan Glazer	Nominated	
Alliance of Women Film Journalists	4 January 2024	Best Actress in a Supporting Role	Sandra Hüller	Nominated	
Alliance of Women Film Journalists	4 January 2024	Most Daring Performance	Sandra Hüller	Nominated	
Alliance of Women Film Journalists	4 January 2024	Best Screenplay, Adapted	Jonathan Glazer	Nominated	
Alliance of Women Film Journalists	4 January 2024	Best Cinematography	Łukasz Żal	Nominated	
Alliance of Women Film Journalists	4 January 2024	Best Editing	Paul Watts	Nominated	
Alliance of Women Film Journalists	4 January 2024	Best Non-English-Language Film	The Zone of Interest	Won	
Astra Film Awards	6 January 2024	Best International Feature	The Zone of Interest	Nominated	
Astra Film Awards	6 January 2024	Best International Filmmaker	Jonathan Glazer	Nominated	
Astra Film Awards	6 January 2024	Best International Actor	Christian Friedel	Nominated	
Austin Film Critics Association Awards	10 January 2024	Best International Film	The Zone of Interest	Nominated	
Bodil Awards	15 March 2025	Best Non-English Language Film	The Zone of Interest	Won	
British Academy Film Awards	18 February 2024	Outstanding British Film	The Zone of Interest	Won	
British Academy Film Awards	18 February 2024	Best Film Not in the English Language	The Zone of Interest	Won	
British Academy Film Awards	18 February 2024	Best Director	Jonathan Glazer	Nominated	
British Academy Film Awards	18 February 2024	Best Adapted Screenplay	Jonathan Glazer	Nominated	
British Academy Film Awards	18 February 2024	Best Actress in a Supporting Role	Sandra Hüller	Nominated	
British Academy Film Awards	18 February 2024	Best Cinematography	Łukasz Żal	Nominated	
British Academy Film Awards	18 February 2024	Best Editing	Paul Watts	Nominated	
British Academy Film Awards	18 February 2024	Best Production Design	Chris Oddy	Nominated	
British Academy Film Awards	18 February 2024	Best Sound	Johnnie Burn & Tarn Willers	Won	
Belgian Film Critics Association	4 January 2025	Grand Prix	The Zone of Interest	Won	
Boston Society of Film Critics Awards	10 December 2023	Best Film	The Zone of Interest	Runner-up	
Boston Society of Film Critics Awards	10 December 2023	Best Director	Jonathan Glazer	Won	
Boston Society of Film Critics Awards	10 December 2023	Best Adapted Screenplay	Jonathan Glazer	Won	
Boston Society of Film Critics Awards	10 December 2023	Best Original Score	Mica Levi	Runner-up	
Boston Society of Film Critics Awards	10 December 2023	Best Foreign Language Film	The Zone of Interest	Won	
Camerimage	18 November 2023	FIPRESCI Award	The Zone of Interest	Won	
Cannes Film Festival	27 May 2023	Palme d'Or	Jonathan Glazer	Nominated	
Cannes Film Festival	27 May 2023	Grand Prix	Jonathan Glazer	Won	
Cannes Film Festival	27 May 2023	FIPRESCI Prize	Jonathan Glazer	Won	
Cannes Film Festival	27 May 2023	Soundtrack Award	Mica Levi	Won	
Cannes Film Festival	27 May 2023	CST Award for Best Artist-Technician	Johnnie Burn	Won	
Chicago Film Critics Association Awards	12 December 2023	Best Supporting Actress	Sandra Hüller	Nominated	
Chicago Film Critics Association Awards	12 December 2023	Best Adapted Screenplay	Jonathan Glazer	Nominated	
Chicago Film Critics Association Awards	12 December 2023	Best Original Score	Mica Levi	Nominated	
Chicago Film Critics Association Awards	12 December 2023	Best Cinematography	Łukasz Żal	Nominated	
Chicago Film Critics Association Awards	12 December 2023	Best Foreign Language Film	The Zone of Interest	Won	
Critics' Choice Movie Awards	14 January 2024	Best Foreign Language Film	The Zone of Interest	Nominated	
Dallas–Fort Worth Film Critics Association	December 18, 2023	Best Foreign Language Film	The Zone of Interest	Second	
Dallas–Fort Worth Film Critics Association	December 18, 2023	Russell Smith Award	The Zone of Interest	Won	
Denver Film Critics Society	12 January 2024	Best Original Score	Mica Levi	Nominated	
Denver Film Critics Society	12 January 2024	Best Non-English Language Feature	The Zone of Interest	Won (Note: Tied with Godzilla Minus One.)	
European Film Awards	9 December 2023	Best European Film	The Zone of Interest	Nominated	
European Film Awards	9 December 2023	Best European Director	Jonathan Glazer	Nominated	
European Film Awards	9 December 2023	Best European Screenwriter	Jonathan Glazer	Nominated	
European Film Awards	9 December 2023	Best European Actor	Christian Friedel	Nominated	
European Film Awards	9 December 2023	Best European Actress	Sandra Hüller	Nominated	
European Film Awards	9 December 2023	Best European Sound Designer	Johnnie Burn & Tarn Willers	Won	
Florida Film Critics Circle Awards	December 21, 2023	Best Director	Jonathan Glazer	Nominated	
Florida Film Critics Circle Awards	December 21, 2023	Best Foreign Language Film	The Zone of Interest	Runner-up	
Florida Film Critics Circle Awards	December 21, 2023	Best Art Direction / Production Design	The Zone of Interest	Nominated	
Florida Film Critics Circle Awards	December 21, 2023	Best Cinematography	Łukasz Żal	Nominated	
Cinema for Peace Awards	19 February 2024	Most Valuable Film of the Year 2024	Jonathan Glazer	Won	
Gaudí Awards	18 January 2025	Best European Film	The Zone of Interest	Nominated	
Georgia Film Critics Association Awards	5 January 2024	Best Original Score	Mica Levi	Nominated	
Georgia Film Critics Association Awards	5 January 2024	Best International Film	The Zone of Interest	Nominated	
Golden Globe Awards	7 January 2024	Best Motion Picture – Drama	The Zone of Interest	Nominated	
Golden Globe Awards	7 January 2024	Best Picture – Non-English Language	The Zone of Interest	Nominated	
Golden Globe Awards	7 January 2024	Best Original Score	Mica Levi	Nominated	
Golden Reel Awards	3 March 2024	Outstanding Achievement in Sound Editing – Foreign Language Feature	Johnnie Burn, Simon Carroll, Max Behrens, Joe Mount, Brendan Feeney, Ewa Mazurkiewicz, Natalia Lubowiecka, Dawid Konecki, Kamil Kwiatkowski	Nominated	
Gotham Independent Film Awards	27 November 2023	Best International Feature	The Zone of Interest	Nominated	
Gotham Independent Film Awards	27 November 2023	Best Screenplay	Jonathan Glazer	Nominated	
Gotham Independent Film Awards	27 November 2023	Outstanding Supporting Performance	Sandra Hüller	Nominated	
Goya Awards	8 February 2025	Best European Film	The Zone of Interest	Nominated	
Hollywood Music in Media Awards	15 November 2023	Best Original Score — Independent Film	Mica Levi	Won	
Houston Film Critics Society	22 January 2024	Best Foreign Language Feature	The Zone of Interest	Won	
Independent Spirit Awards	25 February 2024	Best International Film	The Zone of Interest	Nominated	
Indiana Film Journalists Association	17 December 2023	Best Foreign Language Film	The Zone of Interest	Won	
Indiana Film Journalists Association	17 December 2023	Best Cinematography	Łukasz Żal	Nominated	
IndieWire Critics Poll	11 December 2023	Best Film	The Zone of Interest	6th Place	
IndieWire Critics Poll	11 December 2023	Best Director	Jonathan Glazer	3rd Place	
IndieWire Critics Poll	11 December 2023	Best Screenplay	Jonathan Glazer	9th Place (Note: Tied with Greta Gerwig and Noah Baumbach for Barbie.)	
IndieWire Critics Poll	11 December 2023	Best Cinematography	Łukasz Żal	4th Place	
IndieWire Critics Poll	11 December 2023	Best International Film	The Zone of Interest	2nd Place	
Ivor Novello Awards	22 May 2025	Best Original Film Score	Mica Levi	Nominated	
Kansas City Film Critics Circle	27 January 2024	Best Foreign Language Film	The Zone of Interest	Runner-up	
Las Vegas Film Critics Society	13 December 2023	Best International Film	The Zone of Interest	Nominated	
Los Angeles Film Critics Association Awards	10 December 2023	Best Film	The Zone of Interest	Won	
Los Angeles Film Critics Association Awards	10 December 2023	Best Director	Jonathan Glazer	Won	
Los Angeles Film Critics Association Awards	10 December 2023	Best Lead Performance	Sandra Hüller	Won (Note: Awarded for both The Zone of Interest and Anatomy of a Fall. Shared with Emma Stone for Poor Things.)	
Los Angeles Film Critics Association Awards	10 December 2023	Best Music	Mica Levi	Won	
Montclair Film Festival	29 October 2023	Breakthrough Performer Award	Christian Friedel	Won	
National Board of Review	6 December 2023	Top Five International Films	The Zone of Interest	Won (Note: This award does not have a single winner, but recognizes multiple films.)	
National Society of Film Critics	6 January 2024	Best Director	Jonathan Glazer	Won	
National Society of Film Critics	6 January 2024	Best Actress	Sandra Hüller	Won (Note: Also for Anatomy of a Fall.)	
National Society of Film Critics	6 January 2024	Best Film	The Zone of Interest	Runner-up	
National Society of Film Critics	6 January 2024	Best Cinematography	Łukasz Żal	Runner-up	
North Texas Film Critics Association	18 December 2023	Best Foreign Language Film	The Zone of Interest	Nominated	
Oklahoma Film Critics Circle	3 January 2024	Top 10 Films	The Zone of Interest	6th Place	
Oklahoma Film Critics Circle	3 January 2024	Best Foreign Language Film	The Zone of Interest	Won	
Oklahoma Film Critics Circle	3 January 2024	Best Body of Work	Sandra Hüller	Won	
Polish Film Awards	10 March 2025	Best Film	Jonathan Glazer	Nominated	
Polish Film Awards	10 March 2025	Best Director	Jonathan Glazer	Nominated	
Polish Film Awards	10 March 2025	Best Screenplay	Jonathan Glazer	Nominated	
Polish Film Awards	10 March 2025	Best Cinematography	Łukasz Żal	Nominated	
Polish Film Awards	10 March 2025	Best Production Design	Chris Oddy	Nominated	
Polish Film Awards	10 March 2025	Best Costume Design	Małgorzata Karpiuk	Nominated	
Polish Film Awards	10 March 2025	Best Sound	Johnnie Burn and Tarn Willers	Won	
Producers Guild of America Awards	25 February 2024	Outstanding Producer of Theatrical Motion Pictures	The Zone of Interest	Nominated	
Robert Awards	1 February 2025	Best Non-English Language Film	The Zone of Interest	Won	
San Diego Film Critics Society	19 December 2023	Best Supporting Actress	Sandra Hüller	Nominated	
San Diego Film Critics Society	19 December 2023	Best Adapted Screenplay	Jonathan Glazer	Nominated	
San Diego Film Critics Society	19 December 2023	Best Foreign Language Film	The Zone of Interest	Runner-up (Note: Shared with Godzilla Minus One.)	
San Diego Film Critics Society	19 December 2023	Best Sound Design	The Zone of Interest	Won	
San Francisco Bay Area Film Critics Circle Awards	January 9, 2024	Best Film	The Zone of Interest	Nominated	
San Francisco Bay Area Film Critics Circle Awards	January 9, 2024	Best Director	Jonathan Glazer	Won	
San Francisco Bay Area Film Critics Circle Awards	January 9, 2024	Best Supporting Actress	Sandra Hüller	Nominated	
San Francisco Bay Area Film Critics Circle Awards	January 9, 2024	Best Adapted	Jonathan Glazer	Nominated	
San Francisco Bay Area Film Critics Circle Awards	January 9, 2024	Best International Feature Film	The Zone of Interest	Won	
San Francisco Bay Area Film Critics Circle Awards	January 9, 2024	Best Cinematography	Łukasz Żal	Nominated	
San Francisco Bay Area Film Critics Circle Awards	January 9, 2024	Best Film Editing	Paul Watts	Won	
San Francisco Bay Area Film Critics Circle Awards	January 9, 2024	Best Original Score	Mica Levi	Nominated	
Satellite Awards	18 February 2024	Best Director	Jonathan Glazer	Nominated	
Satellite Awards	18 February 2024	Best Screenplay, Adapted	Jonathan Glazer and Martin Amis	Nominated	
Satellite Awards	18 February 2024	Best Motion Picture – International	The Zone of Interest	Won	
Seattle Film Critics Society Awards	8 January 2024	Best Picture of the Year	The Zone of Interest	Nominated	
Seattle Film Critics Society Awards	8 January 2024	Best Actress in a Supporting Role	Sandra Hüller	Nominated	
Seattle Film Critics Society Awards	8 January 2024	Best International Film	The Zone of Interest	Nominated	
Seattle Film Critics Society Awards	8 January 2024	Best Cinematography	Łukasz Żal	Nominated	
Seattle Film Critics Society Awards	8 January 2024	Best Original Score	Mica Levi	Nominated	
Society of Composers & Lyricists	23 February 2024	Outstanding Original Score for an Independent Film	Mica Levi	Nominated	
Southeastern Film Critics Association	18 December 2023	Top 10 Films	The Zone of Interest	10th Place	
St. Louis Film Critics Association	17 December 2023	Best Film	The Zone of Interest	Nominated	
St. Louis Film Critics Association	17 December 2023	Best International Film	The Zone of Interest	Runner-up	
St. Louis Film Critics Association	17 December 2023	Best Adapted Screenplay	Jonathan Glazer	Nominated	
St. Louis Film Critics Association	17 December 2023	Best Cinematography	Łukasz Żal	Nominated	
St. Louis Film Critics Association	17 December 2023	Best Score	Mica Levi	Nominated	
Vancouver Film Critics Circle	12 February 2024	Best Picture	The Zone of Interest	Nominated	
Vancouver Film Critics Circle	12 February 2024	Best Director	Jonathan Glazer	Nominated	
Vancouver Film Critics Circle	12 February 2024	Best International Film in a Non-English Language	The Zone of Interest	Won	
Toronto Film Critics Association	17 December 2023	Best Picture	The Zone of Interest	Won	
Toronto Film Critics Association	17 December 2023	Best Director	Jonathan Glazer	Won	
Toronto Film Critics Association	17 December 2023	Best International Feature	The Zone of Interest	Runner-up (Note: Shared with Anatomy of a Fall.)	
Washington D.C. Area Film Critics Association Awards	10 December 2023	Best Foreign Language Film	The Zone of Interest	Nominated	

== See also ==
- Independent cinema in the United Kingdom
- Slow cinema
- Minimalist film
- List of submissions to the 96th Academy Awards for Best International Feature Film
- List of British submissions for the Academy Award for Best International Feature Film
- List of Academy Award winners and nominees from Great Britain
