= The Zone of Interest (novel) =

2014 novel by Martin Amis

- Author: Martin Amis
- Language: English
- Genre: Novel
- Publisher: Jonathan Cape
- Publication date: 28 August 2014
- Pages: 306
- ISBN: 978-0-385-35349-6
- Dewey Decimal: 823/.914 21

The Zone of Interest is the fourteenth novel by the English author Martin Amis, published in 2014. Set in Auschwitz, it tells the story of a Nazi officer who has become enamoured of the camp commandant's wife. The story is conveyed by three narrators: Angelus Thomsen, the officer; Paul Doll, the commandant; and Szmul Zacharias, a Jewish Sonderkommando.

In 2023, the novel was loosely adapted by director Jonathan Glazer into a film of the same name.

== Synopsis ==
The novel begins in August 1942, with Thomsen's first sight of Hannah Doll, wife of Paul Doll, the camp's commandant (a fictionalised version of Rudolf Höss). He is immediately intrigued and initiates a few encounters with her. In time their relationship becomes more intimate even though it remains unfulfilled. Despite their attempts at discretion, Paul Doll's suspicions are raised. He has her followed by one of the camp's prisoners, and is informed by him that they did indeed make two exchanges of letters. While spying on Hannah in the bathroom (as he does regularly), Paul watches her read the letter from Thomsen secretly and rather excitedly, before destroying it. From that point onward, his wife becomes increasingly contemptuous of him, viciously taunting him in private and embarrassing him in public. Paul decides to assign Szmul, a long-serving member of the Sonderkommando, to murder his wife. He does so by threatening to capture Szmul's wife Shulamith. The murder is scheduled to take place on 30 April 1943 – at Walpurgisnacht.

The narrative then skips a few years to the story's aftermath. In September 1948, Thomsen attempts to find Hannah, who has disappeared. He finds her at Rosenheim, where she met her husband. He is told what happened at Walpurgisnacht: at the moment Szmul was to murder Hannah, he instead pointed the weapon on himself and revealed the truth to her. Paul Doll then shot him before he could commit suicide. Thomsen asks Hannah if they could still meet each other. She tells him that while in the concentration camp he was to her a figure for what was sane and decent, outside the camp he simply reminded her of her past life's insanity. Despondently, he withdraws and leaves her.

== Structure and themes ==
The novel is divided into six chapters and an epilogue. Each of the six chapters is divided into three sections: the first is narrated by Thomsen, the second by Paul Doll, and the third by Szmul. The epilogue, named Aftermath, is also divided into three sections, all of them narrated by Thomsen, and each devoted to a different woman: first Esther, then Gerda Bormann, and finally Hannah Doll.

The styles and manners of the three narrators vary widely. Thomsen is the protagonist of the novel, mostly indifferent to the camp's crimes until his falling in love with Hannah Doll. Paul Doll's style is more eccentric and delusional than Thomsen's. He is zealously devoted to the Nazi effort of genocide, and shows a terrifying apathy to the horrors of the concentration camp. His growing instability is magnified when, during his ruminations, he insists he is a perfectly normal man acting as any other man would. As the German defeat becomes imminent and affects the morale of everyone around him, Doll makes an absurdly detached evaluation of the war's aftermath. Of the three, Szmul is the most obscure, and his narration serves as a small epilogue for each chapter. His tone is sepulchral, and most of his thoughts consist of incredulous reflection on his actions.

== Reception ==
Reviews were largely positive, with some naming it Amis' best novel in 25 years, since the much acclaimed London Fields. Joyce Carol Oates, writing for The New Yorker, described the novel as "a compendium of epiphanies, appalled asides, anecdotes, and radically condensed history", with Amis "at his most compelling as a satiric vivisectionist with a cool eye and an unwavering scalpel". A reviewer in The Washington Post gave praise for Amis' singular talent for words, and praised character Paul Doll's narration as "a masterful comic performance".

Criticism of the book characterized its plot as anticlimactic and its eroticism as inappropriate, given the subject matter.

=== Awards and honours ===
- 2015 Walter Scott Prize, shortlist

== Film adaptation ==
In 2023, the book was loosely adapted into a feature film of the same name by writer/director Jonathan Glazer. The film won awards at numerous festivals, including the Grand Prix at Cannes, and was nominated for five Academy Awards including Best Picture, and won two, for Best International Feature and Best Sound.
