= Artois (disambiguation) =

Artois may refer to:

== Places ==
- Artois, former province in northern France
  - County of Artois, Carolingian county in Western Francia
  - Counts of Artois, rulers of the County of Artois
  - Battle of Artois (disambiguation), several battles fought during the First World War
  - Agglomeration community of Artois, administrative entity in the Pas-de-Calais département
- Artois, California, unincorporated community in the United States

== Beer ==
- Stella Artois, lager beer
- Peeterman Artois, a wheat-based lager
- Artois Bock, specialty beer

== People ==
- House of Artois, a cadet branch of Capetian dynasty stemmed from Louis VIII of France
- Charles X of France (1757–1836), formerly comte d'Artois
- Guy D'Artois (1917–1999), Canadian Army officer and SOE agent during World War II
- Rene Artois, fictional character in British sitcom 'Allo 'Allo! portrayed by Gorden Kaye

== Other ==
- Artois (cloak), a long cloak worn by women in the 18th century
- Artois Hound, breed of dog
- HMS Artois, ships of the Royal Navy
