= Joanna Johnston =

British costume designer for film (b. 1953)

Joanna Johnston (born 1953) is an English costume designer for film. She is best known for frequent collaborations with American film directors Steven Spielberg, Robert Zemeckis and M. Night Shyamalan. She was nominated for both BAFTA and Academy Awards for Best Costume for her work on Lincoln and Allied. In 2018, Johnston received the Career Achievement Award from the Costume Designers Guild.

Johnston's first solo designing job was for director Robert Zemeckis's Who Framed Roger Rabbit (1988). The working relationship with Zemeckis continued, through Back to the Future Part II (1989), Back to the Future Part III (1990), Death Becomes Her (1992), Forrest Gump (1994), Contact (1997), Cast Away (2000), The Polar Express (2004), and Allied (2016).

Johnston is also an established member of Steven Spielberg's creative team. She worked with the director on Indiana Jones and the Temple of Doom (1984) as Anthony Powell's assistant, as wardrobe supervisor for the Kenya unit in The Color Purple (1985) and then costume designer on Indiana Jones and the Last Crusade (1989). They worked together again on Saving Private Ryan (1998), War of the Worlds (2005), Munich (2005), War Horse (2011), Lincoln (2012) and The BFG (2016).

Costume designer and historian Deborah Nadoolman Landis has used Johnston as an example of how costume designers "serve their directors as precisely as possible, along the way making incalculable contributions to the look and feel of those pictures".

== Costume career ==
=== Training and early projects ===
In 1977, Johnston started her costume career at London costume house Bermans & Nathans. After a year, she left to work freelance as assistant to a series of renowned designers, who mentored her in her early career. These early credits include Death on The Nile (1978, costume design by Anthony Powell), The French Lieutenant's Woman (1981, costume designer Tom Rand) and Out of Africa (1985, costume designer Milena Canonero).

Johnston's first feature film costume design credit was Hellraiser (1987, directed by Clive Barker). Johnston was responsible for dressing the film's human villains, Julia and Larry, in business suits with shoulder pads and striped shirts. In constrast, the Cenobite costumes of black S&M-style PVC with biomechanical detailing were designed by Jane Wildgoose.

=== 1980s-1990s ===
Johnston's first solo designer credit was Who Framed Roger Rabbit (1988). She has described it as "a dream first solo project... on the cutting edge of filmmaking technology", for combining animation and live action. Johnston was initially employed to dress the human characters, but during production she became involved with the design of the animated character Jessica Rabbit, and took the opportunities offered by animation to design "a dress impossible to wear in reality". Nevertheless, she was still constrained by resources: Johnston's original design for a fully sequinned dress was too expensive to animate, so it was changed to a solid red gown.

As costume designer on Death Becomes Her (dir. Zemeckis, 1992), Joanna Johnston created high-camp, hyper-feminine costumes for actors Meryl Streep, Goldie Hawn and Isabella Rossellini. The costumes were designed to incorporate physical effects (including polyurethene foam padding and animatronics), and combined with CGI.

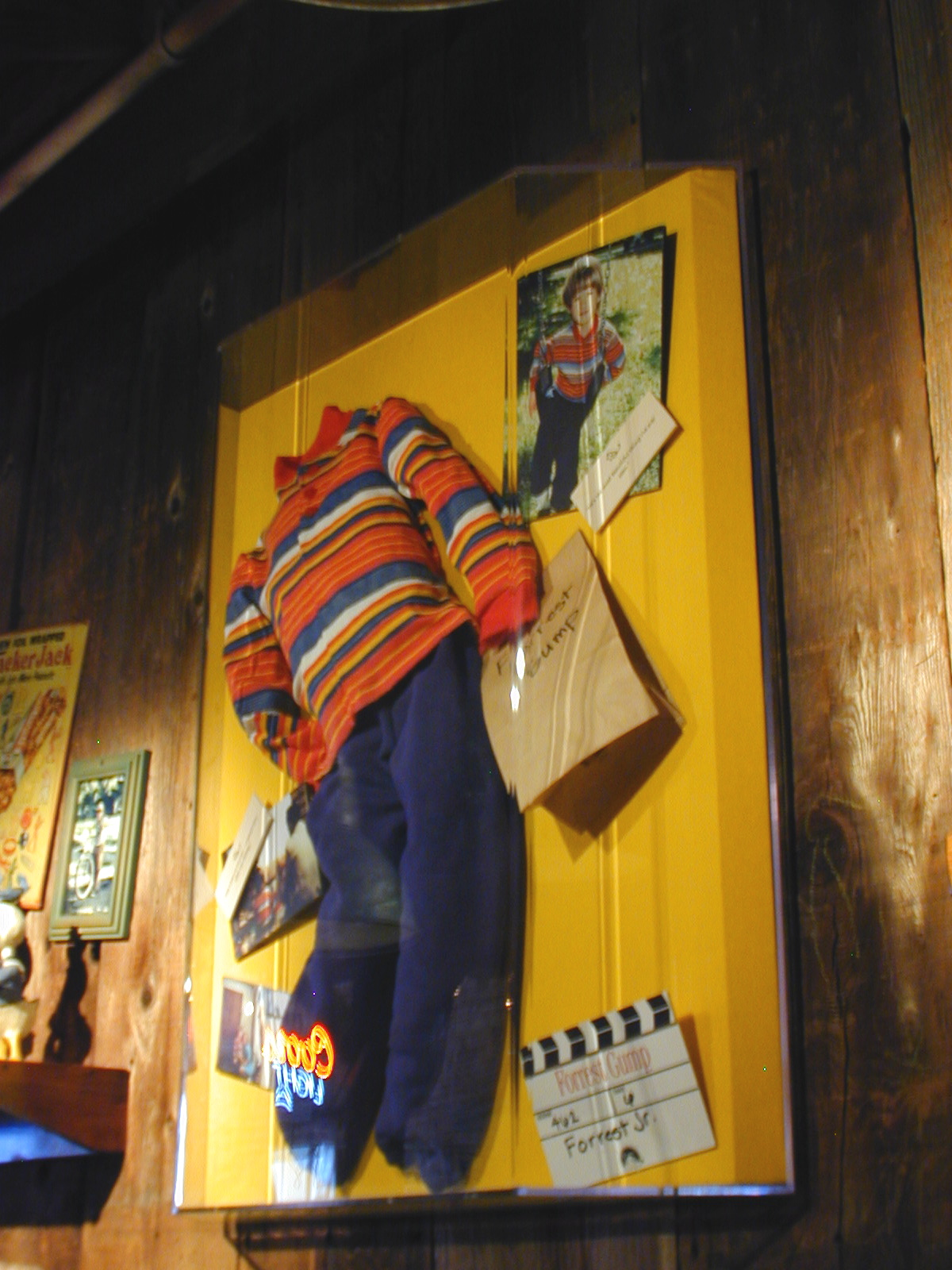
Young Forrest's costume from Forrest Gump (1994), worn by Haley Joel Osment and designed by Joanna Johnston, on display in a themed restaurant in the US.

Johnston designed 83 costume changes for the title character of Forrest Gump (1994), played by Tom Hanks and Haley Joel Osment, as the film followed him from childhood to adulthood. Betty Goodwin, reviewing the film's costumes in the Los Angeles Times, noted that Johnston's work achieved "consistency through the decades" by repeating blue checked shirts and military-level neatness, as instilled by Forrest's mother. Johnston designed the blue plaid shirt and khaki suit featured on the film's poster to look cheap, despite being custom-made by Venice Custom Shirts in Los Angeles: the plaid deliberately does not line up and the collar is uneven. The costumes for Forrest's love interest, Jenny, used embroidery and antique silks to create a "wistfully beautiful" look for the character, partly modelled on French singer Francoise Hardy.

=== 2000s ===
Joanna Johnston first collaborated with British director Richard Curtis on Love Actually (2003), a Christmas rom-com set in contemporary Britain. Interviewed in Grazia magazine, Johnston described discussions with the director about the wedding dress worn by Keira Knightley. Curtis wanted a sexy, cropped outfit with a bare midriff, but Johnston persuaded him that a fitted, sheer over-dress would be more realistic for a church wedding. Johnston worked again with Curtis on The Boat that Rocked (2009).

Re-uniting with Zemeckis for the CGI-animated film Polar Express (2004), Johnston provided special effects teams with real costumes, which could be scanned or worn by actors during motion capture. Johnston has stated that 21st century costume designers need to understand the technical requirements of CGI, and it was essential to maintain "open dialogue with the visual effects team" to achieve the desired costume effects. She explained that costume designers contribute their technical expertise in the construction of fabrics and garments, which can then be applied digitally – she believed that this would lift the restrictions of budgets upon the costume designer's imagination.

=== 2010s ===
Johnston returned to work with Steven Spielberg on War Horse (2011), an adaptation of Michael Morpurgo's novel, set over several years of World War I. Johnston aimed to show the exhausting effects of war through characters' clothing, which deteriorates throughout the film. She also wanted to represent the difference in class and status. Her research at the Imperial War Museum in London research revealed that officers used their own tailors to produce bespoke uniforms, so Johnston incorporated variety into the costumes of the upper class soldiers. For the infantry, they had about 800 costumes made specially.

Johnston received her first Academy Award nomination for Lincoln (2012), a biopic of the American president starring Daniel Day-Lewis. The development period for the film was very long: Steven Spielberg had been hoping to make the film for a decade, so Johnston was aware it was in the works, but once pre-production started, she had only five months to design and create the required nineteenth-century costumes. Interviewed in the Los Angeles Times, Johnston explained that her "long-standing relationship" with Spielberg meant she could anticipate what the director would like. For example, "it went without saying" that they would take an authentic approach to re-creating historic costumes. Johnston's designs for the 16th President were based on archive photographs and a few original pieces of clothing in the Smithsonian Museum. She wanted to exaggerate the president's slim frame, and designed the costumes to be too big, after becoming "obsessed by the space between the cloth and the man". Day-Lewis's period suits were tailored by Michael Sloan, and finished with Lincoln's characteristic slippers and shawl. For Mary Todd Lincoln, played by Sally Field, Johnston made use of wide crinolines and striped fabrics to create large costumes that dominate the screen, and create the "very fussy and over-embellished look" favoured by Mrs Lincoln. She also commissioned replicas of Mrs. Lincoln's original lace and feather-covered bonnets from Henry Ross at Western Costume.

Johnston was recruited to design costumes for Mission: Impossible - Rogue Nation (2015), produced by and starring Tom Cruise. The character of Isla Faust (played by Rebecca Ferguson) needed costumes that would work for stunt sequences, so Johnston designed a blue and chartreuse one-shouldered dress that could be adapted for use with harnesses and safety wear, but would appear unchanged to audiences. Johnston explained that the choice of an evening gown was "unexpected" and the colour was "strong and sexy and light all at the same time". Johnston modelled Tom Cruise's grey suit and white shirt on Cary Grant's look in North by Northwest. To prepare for the scene where Ethan Hunt would hang from the side of an airplane, Johnston sent stuntman Christopher Gordon to altitude in an "off-the-rack" suit. Following the test, Johnston and tailor Michael Sloan reinforced the seams of Cruise's bespoke suit to withstand the impact of his high-altitude stunt.

For The Man From U.N.C.L.E. (dir. Guy Ritchie, 2015), Johnston returned to the 1960s – a decade she had previously costumed for The Boat That Rocked and Forrest Gump. Johnston explained she was attracted to this "radical and adventurous time across all disciplines, from art to fashion and music. What really struck me was the freedom of design of the time; it shines through the photography, the models, the styling, everything."

In 2016, Joanna Johnston received her second nomination for an Academy Award for Best Costume Design for Allied, a 1940s spy action movie starring Brad Pitt and Marion Cotillard. To create the style she called "Hollywood Lift", Johnston studied films of the era, and cited the influence of Hollywood designer Adrian. For Cotillard's costumes, she emulated Lauren Bacall, Barbara Stanwyck, Katharine Hepburn, Bette Davis and Ingrid Bergman, whose look in Casablanca had, according to Johnston, "a real timeless quality ... you could wear it today". For the London sections of the film, Johnston brought in domestic tweeds and wools to contrast with the high glamour of the Morocco sequences. Johnston consulted with uniform specialist Andrew Fletcher for the design of British and Canadian military costumes, as well as the clothing of the Vichy French, who all appear in the "melting pot" of the Special Operations Executive offices. Reflecting on the craftsmanship involved in costuming Allied, Johnston explained, "the magic is having such skilled people as I had on this film – amazing cutters, amazing dressmakers, amazing dyers (we dye a lot of stuff), masses of embroidery."

=== 2020s ===
Johnston designed the costumes for Zemeckis's 2020 update of The Witches. Johnston explained that her designs for the Grand High Witch, played by Anne Hathaway, paid homage to her former boss Anthony Powell's "fabulous, dramatic black-and-white" designs. The story was re-located from the UK to 1960s Alabama, so she also looked to Marilyn Monroe and Faye Dunaway for inspiration for the film's glamorous villain.

== Response and influence ==
Along with the film's dark humour, Johnston's costumes for Death Becomes Her have become "a touchstone of the queer community [and] inspired cosplay and untold drag performances".

The costumes Johnston designed for Love Actually (2003) gained renewed attention during the Y2K fashion revival; in 2022, Architectural Digest noted the film's "early aughts style" in clothing and interiors, singling out "Keira Knightley's newsboy cap" as an example. Fashion website SilkFred claimed "the festive favourite ... serves some serious fashion inspo". In 2023, Hello! Fashion suggested outfits based on the film's costumes, and in 2024 Real Simple claimed that "Keira Knightley's style in 'Love Actually' embodies Y2K fashion", citing the use of layering and low-cut jeans.

In 2018, Johnston was presented with the Career Achievement Award at the 20th annual Costume Designers Guild Awards. While presenting the award, Sally Field revealed that she had kept a pink cardigan from Forrest Gump, and had made a quilt from pieces of all the costumes she wore as Mary Todd Lincoln.

== Personal life ==
Joanna Johnston's father was John Johnston, a Grenadier Guard and member of the Royal Household.

Johnston is resident in both the United States and United Kingdom. In 2024, it was reported that she was building a new studio in Wiltshire to house her workspace and archive.

== Filmography ==
=== Film ===
Year	Title	Director	Notes
1987	Hellraiser	Clive Barker	
1988	Who Framed Roger Rabbit	Robert Zemeckis	
1989	Indiana Jones and the Last Crusade	Steven Spielberg	with Anthony Powell
1989	Back to the Future Part II	Robert Zemeckis	
1990	Back to the Future Part III	Robert Zemeckis	
1992	Far and Away	Ron Howard	
1992	Death Becomes Her	Robert Zemeckis	
1994	Forrest Gump	Robert Zemeckis	
1995	French Kiss	Lawrence Kasdan	
1997	Contact	Robert Zemeckis	
1998	Saving Private Ryan	Steven Spielberg	
1999	The Sixth Sense	M. Night Shyamalan	
2000	Unbreakable	M. Night Shyamalan	
2000	Cast Away	Robert Zemeckis	
2002	About a Boy	Chris Weitz; Paul Weitz	
2003	Love Actually	Richard Curtis	
2004	The Polar Express	Robert Zemeckis	
2005	War of the Worlds	Steven Spielberg	
2005	Munich	Steven Spielberg	
2008	The Spiderwick Chronicles	Mark Waters	
2008	Valkyrie	Bryan Singer	
2009	The Boat That Rocked	Richard Curtis	
2011	War Horse	Steven Spielberg	
2012	Lincoln	Steven Spielberg	
2013	Jack the Giant Slayer	Bryan Singer	
2015	Mission: Impossible – Rogue Nation	Christopher McQuarrie	
2015	The Man from U.N.C.L.E.	Guy Ritchie	
2016	The BFG	Steven Spielberg	
2016	Allied	Robert Zemeckis	
2018	Welcome to Marwen	Robert Zemeckis	
2020	The Witches	Robert Zemeckis	
2022	Jurassic World Dominion	Colin Trevorrow	
2022	Pinocchio	Robert Zemeckis	
2023	Indiana Jones and the Dial of Destiny	James Mangold	
2024	Here	Robert Zemeckis	
2025	The Thursday Murder Club	Chris Columbus	

=== Television ===
Year	Title	Notes
2001	Doctor: Advert for Stella Artois	Television advertisement for Stella Artois
2025	The Girlfriend	6 episodes

== Awards and nominations ==
Major associations

Academy Awards

Year	Category	Nominated work	Result	Ref.
2013	Best Costume Design	Lincoln	Nominated	
2017	Best Costume Design	Allied	Nominated	

BAFTA Awards

Year	Category	Nominated work	Result	Ref.
British Academy Film Awards
2013	Best Costume Design	Lincoln	Nominated	
2017	Best Costume Design	Allied	Nominated	

Miscellaneous awards

List of Joanna Johnston other awards and nominations
Award	Year (Note: Indicates the year of ceremony. Each year is linked to the article about the awards held that year, wherever possible.)	Category	Title	Result	Ref.
Costume Designers Guild Awards	2003	Excellence in Contemporary Film	About a Boy	Nominated	
Costume Designers Guild Awards	2013	Excellence in Period Film	Lincoln	Nominated	
Costume Designers Guild Awards	2018	Career Achievement Award	—N/a	Honored	
Critics' Choice Awards	2013	Best Costume Design	Lincoln	Nominated	
Critics' Choice Awards	2016	Best Costume Design	Allied	Nominated	
Phoenix Film Critics Society Awards	2012	Best Costume Design	Lincoln	Nominated	
Saturn Awards	1991	Best Costume Design	Back to the Future Part II	Nominated	
Saturn Awards	1991	Best Costume Design	Back to the Future Part III	Nominated	
Saturn Awards	1991	Best Costume Design	Indiana Jones and the Last Crusade	Nominated	
Saturn Awards	2009	Best Costume Design	Valkyrie	Nominated	
Saturn Awards	2017	Best Costume Design	The BFG	Nominated	
Saturn Awards	2024	Best Costume Design	Indiana Jones and the Dial of Destiny	Nominated	
