= The Good Doctor =

The Good Doctor or Good Doctor may refer to:

== Arts and entertainment ==
=== Film ===
- The Good Doctor (1939 film), an Argentine film
- The Good Doctor (2011 film), an American thriller

=== Television ===
- Good Doctor (advertisement), a promotion for Stella Artois
- Good Doctor (South Korean TV series), 2013
  - The Good Doctor (American TV series), 2017, based on the South Korean series
  - Good Doctor (Japanese TV series), 2018, based on the South Korean series
- "The Good Doctor" (Law & Order: Criminal Intent), a 2001 episode
- "The Good Doctor", an episode of Close to Home, 2005

=== Literature ===
- The Good Doctors, a 2009 book by John Dittmer
- The Good Doctor (novel), Damon Galgut, 2004

=== Music ===
- "The Good Doctor", a song by the Protomen from the 2009 album Act II: The Father of Death
- “Good Doctor”, a song by Robbie Williams from the 2006 album Rudebox
- "The Good Doctor" a song by Haken from the 2018 album Vector

=== Other uses in arts and entertainment ===
- The Good Doctor (play), by Neil Simon, 1973

== People ==
- Kenny Deuchar (born 1980), Scottish footballer nicknamed "The Good Doctor"
- Harold Shipman (born 1946-2004), English serial killer nicknamed "The Good Doctor"
