= Pretty (advertisement) =

2006 Nike television advertisement

- A frame from Pretty
- Agency: Wieden+Kennedy
- Client: Nike Inc.
- Language: English
- Running time: 60 seconds
- Product: Nike Women sportswear
- Release date: August 20, 2006
- Directed by: Ivan Zachariáš
- Music by: Leonard Bernstein ("I Feel Pretty")
- Starring: Maria Sharapova
- Production company: Smuggler
- Produced by: Robyn Boardman
- Country: United States

Pretty (or I Feel Pretty) is a television advertisement launched in 2006 by Nike, Inc. to promote its "Nike Women" brand of sportswear. The 60-second spot was handled by advertising agency Wieden+Kennedy in Portland, Oregon. The advert stars Russian tennis player Maria Sharapova in her first appearance as a spokesperson for the brand. Pretty debuted on U.S. television on August 20, 2006, with later appearances in cinemas and in print advertisements. It was directed by Czech director Ivan Zachariáš, with post-production and VFX work by The Mill.

The piece was a critical and popular success. It garnered several advertising and television industry awards.

== Sequence ==
Pretty follows a day in the life of Russian tennis player Maria Sharapova. It shows her getting ready, leaving The Waldorf-Astoria Hotel and travelling by limousine to a match at New York City's Arthur Ashe Stadium pursued by paparazzi. Every person she passes on the way sings a line from "I Feel Pretty", a song performed by the character Maria in the second act of the stage musical "West Side Story". She arrives at the game, where fellow players, reporters, camera crew, the ball boys and girls, announcers, and umpire sing the chorus along with the crowd, until silenced by a powerful return ace from Sharapova. The ad ends with a superimposition of the Nike Swoosh and the strapline "Just Do It" over Sharapova as she gets into position for the next serve.

== Background ==
The advertising agency Wieden+Kennedy began its partnership with Nike, Inc. in 1982 and, aside from a short period in the mid-1980s, has held the account ever since. In the early years of the partnership, campaigns were focused almost exclusively at male demographics, leaving the market for women's sportswear to rivals such as Reebok and LA Gear. The few campaigns targeted by Nike at women in the 1980s, including one with the copy line "It wouldn't hurt to stop eating like a pig, either.", had not proved particularly effective. Despite more successful efforts in the 1990s, such as the "If You Let Me Play" campaign, Nike decided in 1997 to briefly reassign the section of its marketing budget given to female-oriented promotion from Wieden+Kennedy to rival firm Goodby, Silverstein & Partners. Goodby's brief tenure as lead agency for this area of Nike's marketing saw it reposition the brand, eschewing the use of celebrity athletes in favour of ordinary women. However, the consolidation of Nike's account in 1999 with Wieden+Kennedy marked the return of celebrity endorsements to Nike campaigns, including athletes such as Olympic runner Suzy Favor-Hamilton. Pretty continued this trend, and showcased the debut of Maria Sharapova as a spokesperson for the brand.

Maria Sharapova had been playing tennis professionally since 2001, and became the youngest girl to reach the final at the junior Australian Open the following year, at the age of 14. In 2004, Sharapova became the third-youngest winner of the women's Wimbledon Championships. By 2005, she was ranked Number 1 in the world. Pretty was filmed and released in the run-up to Sharapova's appearance in the 2006 U.S. Open, a tournament she would go on to win.

== Production ==
Production of the commercial began in early 2006. Wieden+Kennedy signed up director Ivan Zachariáš, known for his award-winning work on Land Rover's "Born Free" campaign and the Stella Artois pieces Plague and Pilot, to direct Pretty. Filming was done entirely on location, and the performances by the actors used in the spot were recorded live on set by miniature microphones concealed in their costume. Pretty was to be the first time Sharapova would appear in the Nike performance tennis dress she would wear to the U.S. Open. The stadium scene was filmed with only 100 extras, along with Tennis Hall of Fame inductee John McEnroe, his brother and captain of the 2004 U.S. Men's Olympic tennis team, Patrick McEnroe, and two-time tennis Olympic gold medalist Mary Joe Fernandez. The remaining 26,000 members of the crowd were created by The Mill before filming even began, using Massive, and were added to the scene in post production. Flame was used for minor enhancements to the piece, including adding reflections and other cleanup.

== Release and reception ==
Pretty debuted on U.S. television on Sunday, August 20, 2006, in a commercial break during Fox's annual Teen Choice Awards ceremony, a week before the start of the 2006 U.S. Open. Its run continued in bursts throughout the remainder of 2006 and the first quarter of 2007. The ad proved fairly popular, and was praised for showing female athletes as strong and self-assured, in direct contrast to an earlier campaign run during the 2004 Summer Olympics which showed Olympic runner Suzy Favor-Hamilton fleeing from a masked killer.

The piece was also critically successful, receiving awards from the advertising and television industries, including two Cannes Gold Lions in the categories of Film and Best Use of Music. It was shortlisted alongside Paint (Sony), Power of Wind (Epuron) and eventual winner Evolution (Dove) for the festival's Grand Prix.

Other awards given to the team behind Pretty include a silver award in the "Retail" category of the British Television Advertising Awards, and a bronze Clio Award in the "Apparel/Fashion" category.

Maria Sharapova went on to win the 2006 U.S. Open, and continues to act as a celebrity spokesperson for the Nike brand. In 2008, she was the focus of another Wieden+Kennedy piece entitled Be Your Own Fan, part of the web-based "Here I Am" advertising campaign, which charts her career to date in animated form.
