= Portland Communications =

British public relations company

- Industry: Communications
- Founded: 2001
- Founder: Tim Allan
- Headquarters: London, United Kingdom
- Key people: Victoria Dean
- Services: Communications
- Number of employees: 490 (2022)
- Website: portland-communications.com

Portland Communications is a political consultancy and public relations agency set up in 2001 by Tim Allan, a former adviser to Tony Blair, director of communications at BSkyB and more recently the Downing Street director of communications to Keir Starmer. Portland provides communications and public affairs advice to brands and high-profile individuals.

== History ==
Portland was founded by Tim Allan in 2001. The Guardian reported that the consultancy launched on the back of a contract from then BSkyB chief executive Tony Ball, who had previously been Allan's boss.

In April 2012, Allan was reported to have sold a majority stake in Portland to media marketing company Omnicom, for an estimated £20 million. The acquisition was structured as a multi-year earnout deal. In November 2019, parent company Omnicom merged Portland with another of its subsidiaries, the public affairs firm GPlus.

== Leadership ==
Portland's chief executive officer (CEO) is Simon Whitehead, who took over in 2025. Prior to this, Victoria Dean, former British High Commissioner to Barbados and the Eastern Caribbean and global head of public policy at Google was CEO, with her departure announced in March 2024. The company's first CEO was founder Tim Allan, who stepped down in November 2019 when Portland's parent company Omnicom merged the company with another public affairs firm, GPlus. Allan was succeeded as CEO by Mark Flanagan in January 2020, who held the role until 2022.

== Controversies ==
=== Appointment of James O'Shaughnessy ===
In January 2012, Portland Communications hired James O'Shaughnessy, Prime Minister David Cameron's former director of policy, as Chief Policy Advisor. The Independent reported that O'Shaughnessy failed to inform the Whitehall committee which vets jobs for officials leaving Government, which was described by Sir Alistair Graham, the former chairman of the Committee of Standards in Public Life, as a "serious error of judgement". O'Shaughnessy was elevated to the peerage in 2015.

=== Wikipedia editing ===
In January 2012, MP Tom Watson discovered that Portland Communications had tried to remove references to a client's brand of lager, Stella Artois, from the wife-beater disambiguation page in Wikipedia. The beer had become known in the UK as "wife-beater", in part because of its high alcohol content, and perceived connection with binge drinking and aggression. Other edits from Portland's offices included changes to articles about another Portland client, the Kazakhstan's BTA Bank, and its former head Mukhtar Ablyazov. Portland did not deny making the changes, arguing they had been done transparently and in accordance with Wikipedia's policies.

In January 2026, The Bureau of Investigative Journalism alleged that Portland Communications used subcontractors to edit Wikipedia entries for clients – for example, to downplay unfavourable comments about human rights violations in Qatar during preparations for the 2022 FIFA World Cup and their links with terrorist group Jabhat al-Nusra, to change details about the Gates Foundation-funded Alliance for a Green Revolution in Africa, and to change details about a dispute concerning Libya's sovereign wealth fund. Portland said editing Wikipedia pages was not endorsed by Portland, nor was it ever a widespread practice among employees, and current staff did not engage in the activity.

=== Qatar ===
In 2014 it was revealed that Portland had been hired for $150,000 by Qatar "for a communications/political push targeted at Congress and federal agencies to improve ties with the US". The firm admitted to online attacks of critics of their client, the government of Qatar, who hosted the 2022 World Cup.

In April 2025, Portland and its parent company Omnicom were sued by migrant workers from the 2022 World Cup, accusing them of sportswashing in relation to their work on Qatar's human rights record.

=== Labour Party conspiracy accusations ===
In 2016, left-wing political website The Canary alleged that Portland staff were behind the orchestration of a "coup" against the Leader of the Labour Party, Jeremy Corbyn, after a wave of mass resignations from his front bench. Len McCluskey of British and Irish trade union Unite told Andrew Marr on his Sunday morning programme that "I'm amazed that some of the MPs have fallen into a trap." Referring to Portland Communications as a "sinister force", McCluskey said, "This is a PR company with strong links to Tony Blair and right-wing Labour MPs who've been involved in this orchestrated coup, and the coup has failed". Portland Communications denied any allegations as "a ridiculous conspiracy theory and completely untrue".
