= Tim Allan =

British public relations consultant

Downing Street Director of Communications
- In office 3 September 2025 – 9 February 2026
- Prime Minister: Keir Starmer
- Preceded by: Steph Driver
- Succeeded by: Sarah Brown

Advisor to Tony Blair
- In office 1992 to 1998

Personal details
- Born: Timothy Neil Allan
- Party: Labour
- Education: Pembroke College, Cambridge; INSEAD
- Occupation: Public relations consultant

Timothy Neil Allan is a British public relations consultant. He was an advisor to Tony Blair from 1992 to 1998, and the Downing Street Director of Communications to Keir Starmer from 2025 to 2026. He founded and managed Portland Communications, which he grew to be one of the United Kingdom's leading public affairs consultancies. He served as the chair of the Young Foundation think tank between 2012 and 2016 and was a trustee of Sex Matters from 2024 to 2025.

== Education ==
Allan was educated at the Royal Grammar School, Guildford, Godalming College, and Pembroke College, Cambridge. He completed an MBA at INSEAD in 2000.

== Career ==
Allan started his political career in 1992 as a researcher for Tony Blair, who was Shadow Home Secretary. When Blair was elected as Leader of the Opposition in 1994, Allan became his deputy press secretary. Following the 1997 general election, he became Deputy Director of Communications at 10 Downing Street, reporting to Alastair Campbell.

Between 1998 and 2001, he was director of corporate communications at BSkyB.

In 2001 Allan founded public relations consultancy Portland Communications, which was launched as the result of a contract with Allan's boss, BSkyB chief executive Tony Ball. In January 2012, MP Tom Watson discovered that Portland Communications had tried to remove references to a client's brand of lager, Stella Artois, from the wife-beater disambiguation page in Wikipedia. The beer had become known in the UK as "wife-beater", in part because of its high alcohol content, and perceived connection with binge drinking and aggression. In April 2012, Allan sold a majority stake in Portland to media marketing company Omnicom for an estimated £20 million.

Allan served as chair of the Young Foundation between 2012 and 2016.

He served as board member of Sex Matters from September 2024 up until his appointment as Downing Street Director of Communications in September 2025. He resigned as director of communications on 9 February 2026, following the resignation of chief of staff Morgan McSweeney.
