= Good Doctor (advertisement) =

2002 advertisement for Stella Artois

- A frame from Good Doctor
- Agency: Lowe Lintas & Partners
- Client: Interbrew
- Language: French
- Running time: 100 seconds (cinema); 60/70 seconds (TV)
- Product: Stella Artois lager
- Release dates: 15 February 2002 (cinema); 15 March 2002 (TV)
- Directed by: Ivan Zacharias
- Music by: Anne Dudley
- Starring: Luc Bataini
- Production company: Stink
- Produced by: Sarah Hallatt
- Country: United Kingdom
- Preceded by: Returning Hero
- Followed by: Devil's Island
- Official website: www.stellaartois.com

Good Doctor (also credited as Doctor or Plague) is a television and cinema advertisement released in 2002 by Interbrew to promote its Stella Artois brand of lager within the United Kingdom. The 100-second spot was produced by advertising agency Lowe Lintas & Partners in London. Good Doctor premiered on British television in January 2002, with later appearances in cinemas. It is the seventh piece in the Jean de Florette-inspired "Reassuringly Expensive" series that had been running since 1992. The advert was directed by Czech director Ivan Zacharias with help from the production company Stink and post-production work by The Moving Picture Company. The commercial was a popular, financial, and critical success, boosting sales during the period in which it ran, and receiving more awards than any other campaign in 2002, including a Cannes Gold Lion, an Epica Award and several prizes from the D&AD Awards.

== Sequence ==
Good Doctor opens in a field in 19th century rural France, where a doctor confirms that one of the field hands is dying of cholera. The other workers flee, leaving the doctor to burn the remains. Later, he is called from his hospital to help another woman, who had collapsed in the town square. The gathered crowd backs away from him as he approaches, and refuses to help him carry the victim away. When he later enters the local public house, an elderly resident threatens him with a shotgun, declaring him "contaminated" and asking him to leave. The town's priest enters and admonishes the patrons, calling the bartender to give the doctor a Stella Artois, which sets the crowd murmuring. The priest shakes the doctor's hand and embraces him, proclaiming him uncontaminated. Nonetheless, the publican warily approaches and places the ordered drink on the floor in front of the doctor. As the doctor begins to drink, the opening strains of the theme from Jean de Florette play in the background. The crowd stares as the priest takes a swig from the same glass, and then passes it to the gun-toting man. As the patrons begin jostling for a sip of the Stella Artois, the doctor coughs. The piece ends with the tableau of the patrons freezing in horror.

== Production ==
=== Background ===
The "Reassuringly Expensive" campaign, of which Good Doctor is part, began in 1982. Frank Lowe, head of the advertising agency behind the production of Good Doctor, worked on marketing for Stella Artois during his tenure at Collett Dickenson Pearce in the 1970s, creating print campaigns such as "My shout, he whispered". In 1981, Lowe left Collett Dickenson Pearce to form his own advertising agency, taking with him the Stella Artois account. Within a year, Lowe launched the "Reassuringly Expensive" campaign, which aimed to turn a substantial negative for the brand (higher prices due to greater Duty on high-alcohol content beverages in the United Kingdom) into a positive, assuring customers that by being more expensive, the premium lager was better than cheaper brands. Earlier pieces were primarily print campaigns, but in 1990, a chance viewing of Jean de Florette led one of Lowe's creative directors to pen a script based on a similar concept. The resulting television and cinema advertisement, Jacques de Florette, proved immensely popular and formed the basis for a series of six award-winning adverts produced between 1991 and 2001, including Good Samaritan, Last Orders and Returning Hero. Good Doctor was announced in February 2002 as the seventh in the series.

=== Production ===
Lowe London approached Czech director Ivan Zacharias, known for his work on Land Rover's Born Free campaign, to direct the piece. Filming took place over six days on location in the south of France, with the cast and crew working from 5am into the night. To achieve the piece's characteristic weathered look, three copies of the film stock (5245 Eastman EXR 50D and 5246 Kodak Vision 250D) were graded separately to emphasize the grain of the film and the earthen tones of the subjects. The three passes were then composited and reworked further in Inferno, an online visual effects system.

=== Actors ===
Doctor: Luc Bataini (Luc Lemarie)
Priest: Jean Claude Arnaud (Sociétaire Comédie Française +)
Gunman: Georges gueret
Barman: Thierry Bois
Fool: Thierry Bareges

== Release and reception ==
=== Schedule ===
The full 100-second version of Good Doctor premiered in British cinemas on 15 February 2002, with 60- and 70-second cuts appearing on television the following month. It continued to screen for the rest of 2002, proving popular with the British public.

=== Response ===
Sales of Stella Artois increased by 18.3% over the year, credited in no small part to the latest "Reassuringly Expensive" piece. This placed it in fifth position in ACNielsen's annual "Biggest Brands" survey for increases in sales within the UK, and cemented Stella's dominance of the premium lager market within the United Kingdom and putting the brand in fifth position in terms of increased sales for the year.

Good Doctor was also immensely successful at the industry's awards ceremonies, receiving more awards than any other advertising campaign worldwide in 2002. These included an award for Best Direction at the British Television Craft Awards, a Bronze Medal from the Institute of Practitioners in Advertising Effectiveness Awards, a Gold in the Alcoholic Beverages category of the Epica Awards, and a Silver Award (plus three nominations) at the D&AD Awards. The piece also won a Gold Lion at the Cannes Lions International Advertising Festival to boos from the gathered audience, a reaction that several other pieces of the "Reassuringly Expensive" campaign had received upon winning awards at the festival in previous years. After winning the Lion, Good Doctor was shortlisted for the festival's Grand Prix Award, considered the most prestigious in the industry, alongside Champagne (for Microsoft's Xbox gaming platform), and eventual winner Odyssey (for Levi's jeans).

=== Legacy ===
The success of the campaign led to the commission of another piece from Vince Squibb, the writer of Good Doctor. The ad, titled Devil's Island, was released in 2003. The following year, Ivan Zacharias returned as a director for a new Stella Artois advertisement, Pilot. Pilot went on itself to win a Bronze Lion at Cannes, among other awards.
