= Artois, California =

Artois
- census-designated place
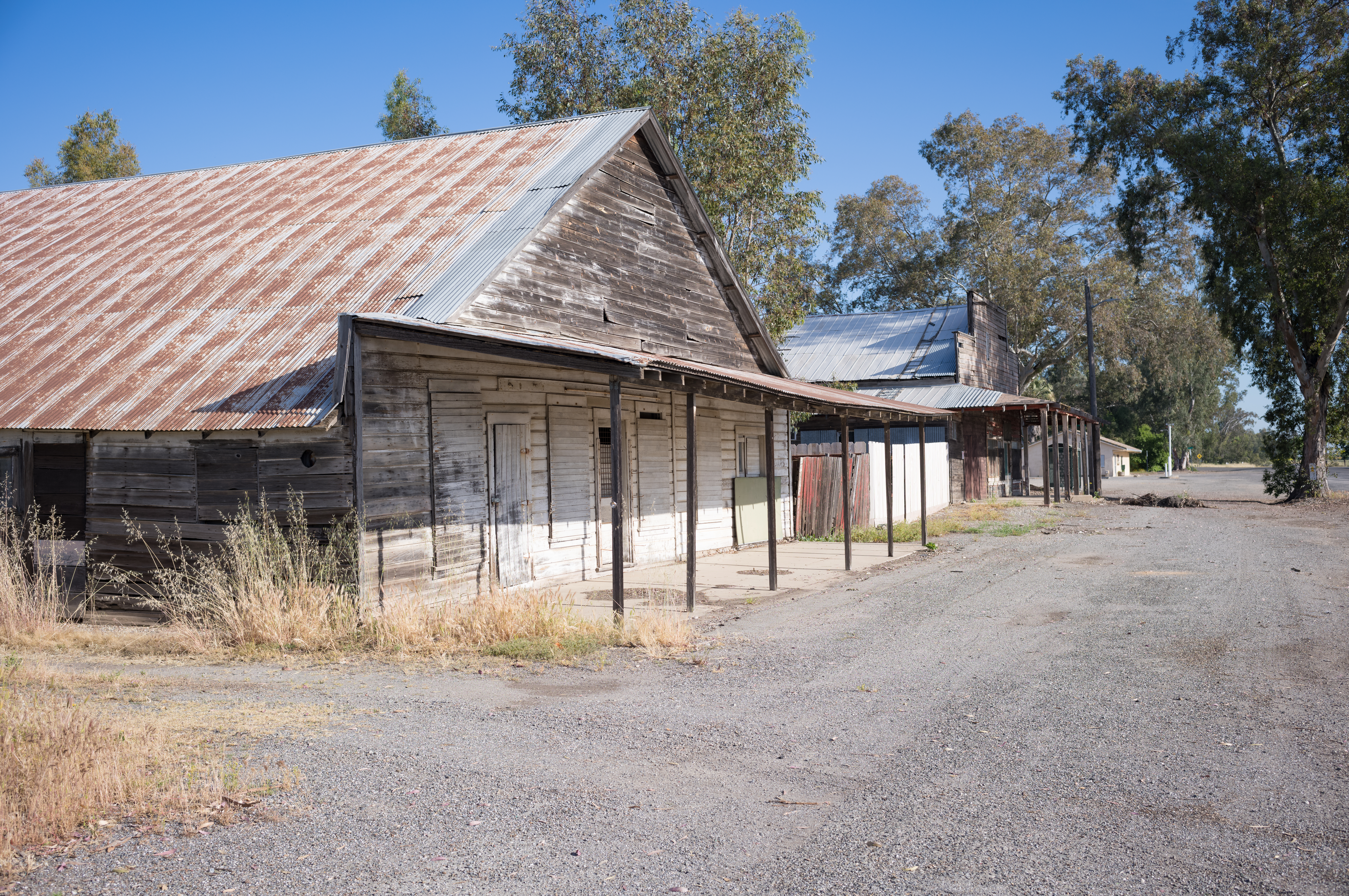
- Downtown Artois, along the former US 99W (April 2023)

- Location of Artois in Glenn County, California.

- Location in California
- Coordinates: 39°37′11″N 122°11′38″W
- Country: United States
- State: California
- County: Glenn

Area
  - Total: 2.88 sq mi (7.46 km^{2})
  - Land: 2.88 sq mi (7.46 km^{2})
  - Water: 0 sq mi (0.00 km^{2}) 0%
- Elevation: 167 ft (51 m)

Population (2020)
  - Total: 295
  - Density: 102.4/sq mi (39.55/km^{2})
- Time zone: UTC-8 (Pacific (PST))
  - Summer (DST): UTC-7 (PDT)
- ZIP Code: 95913
- Area codes: 530, 837
- GNIS feature IDs: 1657951; 2628707

Artois (/ˈɑːr.tɔɪs/), formerly known as Germantown, is a census-designated place in Glenn County, California, United States. It is located 5 miles (8 km) north of Willows, at an elevation of 167 feet (51 m), in the northern Sacramento Valley of California. It is located on the former United States Highway 99W, and is bypassed to the west by Interstate 5. It is served by the California Northern Railroad, formerly the west Sacramento Valley line of the Southern Pacific Railroad. Its coordinates are approximately 39°37' N 122°12' W. The ZIP code for Artois is 95913. The community is served by area code 530. The population was 295 at the 2020 census.

== History ==
The name stems from the ancient province in France where the method of boring artesian wells was first adopted. Artois was formerly named Germantown, and petitions to change the Germantown post office name were successful with Artois adopted on May 21, 1918. Local belief is that a World War I troop train stopped to water at Germantown and a riot ensued when the troops took offense at the name. The town was then renamed after the Battles of Artois.

The Germantown post office opened in 1877, and changed its name to Artois in 1918.

On June 1, 2011, an EF1 tornado struck east of Artois, uprooting hundreds of almond trees, and causing damage to farm equipment and roofing materials.

== The lynching of Christian Mutschler ==
On May 4, 1878, blacksmith Christian Mutschler (also spelled Mutchler) and his friends John Kelley and Henry Holmes got into an argument with a saloon keeper named Hageman. Mutschler, who was suspected of starting a fire in St. Johns, California the year before, was persuaded by Kelley and Holmes, along with W. Hagaman, F. Todt, Charles Hansen and Carl Regensberger to set a bag of shavings afire in the saloon. A couple of cowboys having a drink witnessed Mutschler lighting the shavings and shot him in the leg. Mutschler was charged with arson by the Justice of the Peace, a man named Boardman. Oddly, no charges were brought up on the cowboys. No one would testify against Mutschler so Boardman released him. Mutschler wasted no time in getting out of town, but the local stage was ordered not to let Mutschler ride. He started limping towards Orland, California in the hot sun. Mutschler's friend, John Kelley swore out a complaint that Mutschler had threatened his life, and a deputy was sent up the road to arrest the hapless blacksmith. Mutschler's bail was set at a thousand dollars, which he could not pay. Because Germantown did not have a jail, Mutschler was put into the protective custody of Constable William McLane, the owner of another Germantown saloon, where the prisoner was kept during the night. During the early morning hours of May 5, 1878, a group of twelve to fourteen masked men burst into the saloon and took Mutschler about a quarter of a mile away and shot him to death. Mutschler's friends, Holmes, Kelley, Hansen, Regensberger and a man known as R. Radcliff were all arrested for the crime. Their trial started on December 14, 1878, but the case was immediately dismissed due to missing witnesses.

== Demographics ==
Historical population
Census	Pop.	Note	%±
2010	295		—
2020	295		0.0%
U.S. Decennial Census; 1860–1870 1880-1890; 1900 1910 1920; 1930 1940 1950; 1960 1970 1980; 1990 2000 2010

Artois first appeared as a census designated place in the 2010 U.S. census.

=== 2020 census ===
As of the 2020 census, Artois had a population of 295, with a population density of 102.4 inhabitants per square mile (39.5/km^{2}). The median age was 34.3 years. For every 100 females there were 104.9 males, and for every 100 females age 18 and over there were 107.0 males age 18 and over.

0.0% of residents lived in urban areas, while 100.0% lived in rural areas.

The age distribution was 29.8% under the age of 18, 12.2% aged 18 to 24, 15.6% aged 25 to 44, 24.7% aged 45 to 64, and 17.6% who were 65 years of age or older.

There were 99 households in Artois, of which 36.4% had children under the age of 18 living in them. Of all households, 71.7% were married-couple households, 9.1% were cohabiting couple households, 13.1% were households with a male householder and no spouse or partner present, and 6.1% were households with a female householder and no spouse or partner present. About 10.1% of all households were made up of individuals and 5.1% had someone living alone who was 65 years of age or older. The average household size was 2.98 and there were 82 families (82.8% of all households).

There were 105 housing units at an average density of 36.5 units per square mile (14.1 units/km^{2}), of which 99 (94.3%) were occupied. Of the occupied units, 86.9% were owner-occupied and 13.1% were renter-occupied. The homeowner vacancy rate was 0.0% and the rental vacancy rate was 0.0%.

Racial composition as of the 2020 census
Race	Number	Percent
White	193	65.4%
Black or African American	1	0.3%
American Indian and Alaska Native	5	1.7%
Asian	0	0.0%
Native Hawaiian and Other Pacific Islander	0	0.0%
Some other race	68	23.1%
Two or more races	28	9.5%
Hispanic or Latino (of any race)	98	33.2%

== Politics ==
In the state legislature, Artois is in the 1st senatorial district, represented by Republican Megan Dahle, and in the 3rd Assembly district, represented by Vacant.

Federally, Artois is in California's 1st congressional district, represented by Republican James Gallagher.

== Education ==
Artois is served by the Willows Unified School District.

== Notable person ==
- Sue Ellen Wooldridge, former U.S. attorney
