= Ivan Zachariáš =

Czech film director

- Born: 19 October 1971 (age 54); Prague, Czechoslovakia
- Education: Film and TV School of the Academy of Performing Arts in Prague

Ivan Zachariáš (born 19 October 1971) is a Czech film director. He is known for directing commercials. His work has won the Golden Lion six times at the Cannes Lions International Festival of Creativity.

== Biography ==
Zachariáš was born on 19 October 1971 in Prague. He studied film at the Film and TV School of the Academy of Performing Arts in Prague (FAMU). He was a student at the school during the Velvet Revolution, and began directing commercials and music videos for the new advertising agencies and production companies which were being established. During his career, The Museum of Modern Art in New York acquired his short film Mulit as part of the Association of Independent Commercial Producers awards showcase in 2007. In 2003 Zachariáš directed a Levi's ad with Gael Garcia Bernal. His critically acclaimed Born Free commercial for Land Rover won Golden Lion at Cannes in 2006. Among his other commercial work are the Smile ad for Volkswagen Beetle or The Good Doctor and The Pilot commercials for Stella Artois. In 2005 Zachariáš filmed the famous Impossible Dream commercial for Honda, which won The British Arrows award for the Best Commercial of the Year, and Stunt City for Rexona. In 2006 he directed Pretty commercial with Maria Sharapova for Nike, which won another Gold Lion at Cannes. In 2014, Zachariáš directed Jeff Bridges reprising his role of "The Dude" from The Big Lebowski for a Kahlua advertisement. Zachariáš also made commercials for Apple, Adidas, Absolut Vodka, Volvo, Kronenbourg, Upwork, Newcastle Brown Ale, Chobani or Magners. He is represented as a commercial director by the production company Smuggler.

In recent years Zachariáš collaborated with Karlovy Vary International Film Festival to create trailers with the recipients of Crystal Globe awards.

In 2016, Zachariáš made his television debut with the crime drama Wasteland for HBO Europe, which won the Czech Lion for best drama series.

In 2019, he directed HBO's The Sleepers, a spy thriller, set during the Velvet Revolution.

== Filmography ==
=== Television ===
- Wasteland (HBO, 2016)
- The Sleepers (HBO, 2019)
