= The Sleepers (TV series) =

Czech television series

The Sleepers (Czech: Bez vědomí) is a Czech drama television series, that premiered on HBO Europe in November 2019.

An espionage thriller created by Ivan Zachariáš and Ondřej Gabriel, the series stars Martin Myšička and Tatiana Pauhofová as Victor and Marie, longtime political exiles from Czechoslovakia who return to the country on the eve of the Velvet Revolution. Soon after their return, however, they are involved in a car crash that leaves Marie in a coma; when she awakes, Victor has disappeared and nobody knows where he is, forcing Marie to solve the questions of whether his disappearance was politically motivated, and whether she is in danger herself. The cast also includes Jan Vlasák, Martin Hofmann, Lenka Vlasáková, Petr Lnenicka, Hattie Morahan, David Nykl, Kristýna Podzimková and Jevgenij Libeznuk. CIA partner and world-renowned expert in spy technology, H. Keith Melton, and expert in Czechoslovak secret service, Daniel Povolný, also contributed to the series as an expert advisor.

The series was shot primarily in Prague, with some location shooting in London. Filming in Prague was complicated by the fact that Pauhofová was simultaneously performing in a stage play in Bratislava, in neighbouring Slovakia, meaning long commutes between the set and the theatre.

In advance of its television premiere, two episodes of the series received preview screenings at the Karlovy Vary Film Festival, and in the Primetime program at the 2019 Toronto International Film Festival. The series received the honorable mention from international jury on Serial Killer festival.
