= John Dittmer =

American historian (1939–2024)

John Dittmer (October 30, 1939 – July 19, 2024) was an American historian, and Professor Emeritus of DePauw University.

== Life ==
John Dittmer was from Seymour, Indiana. He was the oldest of 6 children. He graduated from Shields High School in Seymour in 1957, being inducted into SHS Wall of Fame in 2006. He later graduated from Indiana University Bloomington with bachelor's in 1961, master's in 1964 and doctoral degrees in 1971.

He married Ellen Tobey and had a daughter named Julie. He enjoyed tennis and golf, and loved to watch IU football and basketball.

He taught American history at Tougaloo College from 1967 to 1979, at Massachusetts Institute of Technology, Brown University, and at DePauw University from 1985 until 2003. While at DePauw University, he was honored with multiple awards, including the United Methodist Church Exemplary Teaching Award in 2000, and Mr. & Mrs. Fred C. Tucker Jr. Distinguished Career Award in 2003.

The John Dittmer Award at DePauw University is named in his honor.

He died on July 19, 2024, at 84 years old after a brief illness.

== Reviews of other books ==
He reviewed The Confederate and New-Confederate Reader: The "Great Truth" about the "Lost Cause" (edited by James W. Loewen and Edward Sebesta). He called the book an "important" and "persuasive" book, and he argued that it should be "required reading for classroom teachers." He agreed with what the book had to say about "slavery, secession, the Civil War, and Reconstruction."

== Awards ==
- 1995 Bancroft Prize
- Lillian Smith Book Award

== Works ==
- Local people: the struggle for civil rights in Mississippi. University of Illinois Press. 1995. ISBN 978-0-252-06507-1.
- John Dittmer; George C. Wright; W. Marvin Dulaney; Kathleen Underwood (1993). W. Marvin Dulaney; Kathleen Underwood (eds.). Essays on the American civil rights movement. Texas A&M University Press. ISBN 978-0-89096-540-5.
- Black Georgia in the Progressive Era, 1900-1920. University of Illinois Press. 1980. ISBN 978-0-252-00813-9.
- Christopher C. Meyers, ed. (2008). "Black Georgia in the Progressive Era". The Empire State of the South: Georgia History in Documents and Essays. Mercer University Press. ISBN 978-0-88146-111-4.
- The Good Doctors: The Medical Committee for Human Rights and the Struggle for Social Justice in Health Care. Bloomsbury Publishing PLC. 2009. ISBN 978-1-59691-567-1.
