= Allied (film) =

2016 film by Robert Zemeckis

- Theatrical release poster
- Directed by: Robert Zemeckis
- Written by: Steven Knight
- Produced by: Graham King; Steve Starkey; Robert Zemeckis
- Starring: Brad Pitt; Marion Cotillard; Jared Harris; Simon McBurney; Lizzy Caplan
- Cinematography: Don Burgess
- Edited by: Mick Audsley; Jeremiah O'Driscoll
- Music by: Alan Silvestri
- Production companies: Huahua Media; GK Films; ImageMovers (uncredited)
- Distributed by: Paramount Pictures
- Release dates: November 9, 2016 (Regency Village Theatre); November 23, 2016 (United States); November 25, 2016 (United Kingdom)
- Running time: 124 minutes
- Countries: United Kingdom; United States
- Languages: English; French
- Budget: $85–113 million
- Box office: $119.5 million

Allied is a 2016 romantic drama film directed by Robert Zemeckis and written by Steven Knight. It stars Brad Pitt as a Canadian intelligence officer and Marion Cotillard as a French Resistance fighter who fall in love while posing as a married couple during a mission in Casablanca in 1942. Jared Harris, Simon McBurney and Lizzy Caplan also star. Knight developed the script from a story told to him when he was 21. Principal photography began in February 2016 in London and continued in May 2016 in the Canary Islands, which were used to stand in for Morocco.

Joanna Johnston designed the film's costumes, matching them to the characters' mindsets and situations. The film premiered in Los Angeles on November 9, 2016, and was released in the United States on November 23, 2016, by Paramount Pictures. It received mixed reviews from critics, with praise for its costume design, cinematography, and musical score, but saw criticism for its screenplay and the lack of chemistry between the leads. It grossed $40.1 million domestically and $119 million worldwide against an approximate $85–113 million budget, becoming regarded as a box office flop. At the 89th Academy Awards, it was nominated for Best Costume Design.

== Plot ==
In 1942, during World War II, Wing Commander Max Vatan, a Royal Canadian Air Force pilot with intelligence duties, travels to Casablanca in Morocco to assassinate a German ambassador. To pose as a married couple, he is partnered with a French Resistance fighter, Marianne Beauséjour, who escaped from France after her resistance group was compromised and eliminated. Marianne secures Max an invitation to a party where they plan to conduct the assassination. Their mutual affection and a belief that they might not survive the day result in a sexual encounter on the day of the mission. After the successful assassination, they escape, and Max asks Marianne to come with him to London and be his wife. They marry, settle in Hampstead, and have a baby girl whom they name Anna.

In 1944, Max learns from the Special Operations Executive that Marianne may be a German spy who stole the identity of a French Resistance fighter, and that the German ambassador they assassinated was a dissident Hitler wanted dead. To test their suspicions, the SOE runs a "blue dye" tracking operation: Max is ordered to write down a piece of false intelligence at home, where Marianne can find it. If the information is picked up from intercepted German transmissions, Max must execute her, and if found to be an accomplice, he will be hanged for high treason. Defiant, Max visits Guy Sangster, a former colleague who knew Marianne; however, Sangster, blinded in the war, cannot confirm her identity. He reveals that resistance fighter Paul Delamare, who worked with Marianne in France, is still alive in Dieppe and could identify her. Max finds a young pilot, Adam Hunter, and gives him a photograph with a "classified" note—asking if the woman in the photo is Marianne Beauséjour—and instructs him to obtain a "yes" or "no" answer from Delamare. When Max and Marianne host a house party, his commanding officer, Frank Heslop, tells him that Hunter was killed while waiting on the ground for the answer from Delamare and berates him for his insubordination. Max wonders if what he was told about Marianne is a test of his loyalty as part of a promotion to V-Section.

The next evening, Max takes the place of a Lysander pilot and flies to France to meet Delamare. Max and the local resistance break into the town's jail, where a drunken Delamare, in custody, unconvincingly verifies the picture. Germans arrive, alerted by a French policeman, and are defeated by Max and the resistance. Before leaving, Delamare tells Max that Marianne was a talented pianist who had once played La Marseillaise in a café in defiance of occupying Germans. Back home, Max takes Marianne to a pub and demands she play the piano. She admits she is a spy and forwarded the "blue dye" message, which Max left in plain view. She insists her feelings for Max are genuine, and she was forced back into being a spy because German agents were threatening Anna. Max, unable to kill her, insists she flee. He kills Marianne's German handlers and drives to an airbase. Max starts a plane before Heslop and the military police arrive. He pleads his case; Marianne tells him she loves him, asks him to take care of Anna, then kills herself. Heslop orders the military police officers to report that Max executed Marianne as per his orders. The last shots of the film and a few photographs shown in this last sequence explain that, after the war, Max moved with his daughter Anna to a ranch in Medicine Hat, Alberta.

== Cast ==
- Brad Pitt as Max Vatan
- Marion Cotillard as Marianne Beauséjour
- Jared Harris as Frank Heslop
- Simon McBurney as S.O.E. Official
- Lizzy Caplan as Bridget Vatan
- Daniel Betts as George Kavanagh
- Matthew Goode as Guy Sangster
- Camille Cottin as Monique
- August Diehl as Hobar
- Thierry Frémont as Paul Delamare
- Raffey Cassidy as Anna
- Anton Lesser as Emmanuel Lombard

== Production ==
=== Development and pre-production ===
In February 2015, it was announced that Robert Zemeckis was set to direct the film, then only known as an untitled World War II romantic thriller, in which Brad Pitt would star. Steven Knight wrote the original screenplay. It had been a story he had first heard when he was 21 and had traveled with his girlfriend to Texas to visit her family. Her aunt told him the story of how her brother had fallen for a French woman who became pregnant with his child. It was discovered she was a German spy, and, on orders from his superiors, the brother killed her. Knight had desired to make it into a film since that point. While researching for the film, he was never able to find any reference to the story, but did not rule out its accuracy. He shared the story with Pitt, and from there the production began developing. In June 2015, Marion Cotillard was cast to play a spy along with Pitt, who fall in love during a mission to kill a German official. Alan Silvestri, who has served frequently as composer for Zemeckis's films, was hired in October. In January 2016, Jared Harris joined the film, with Lizzy Caplan cast in March.

=== Filming ===
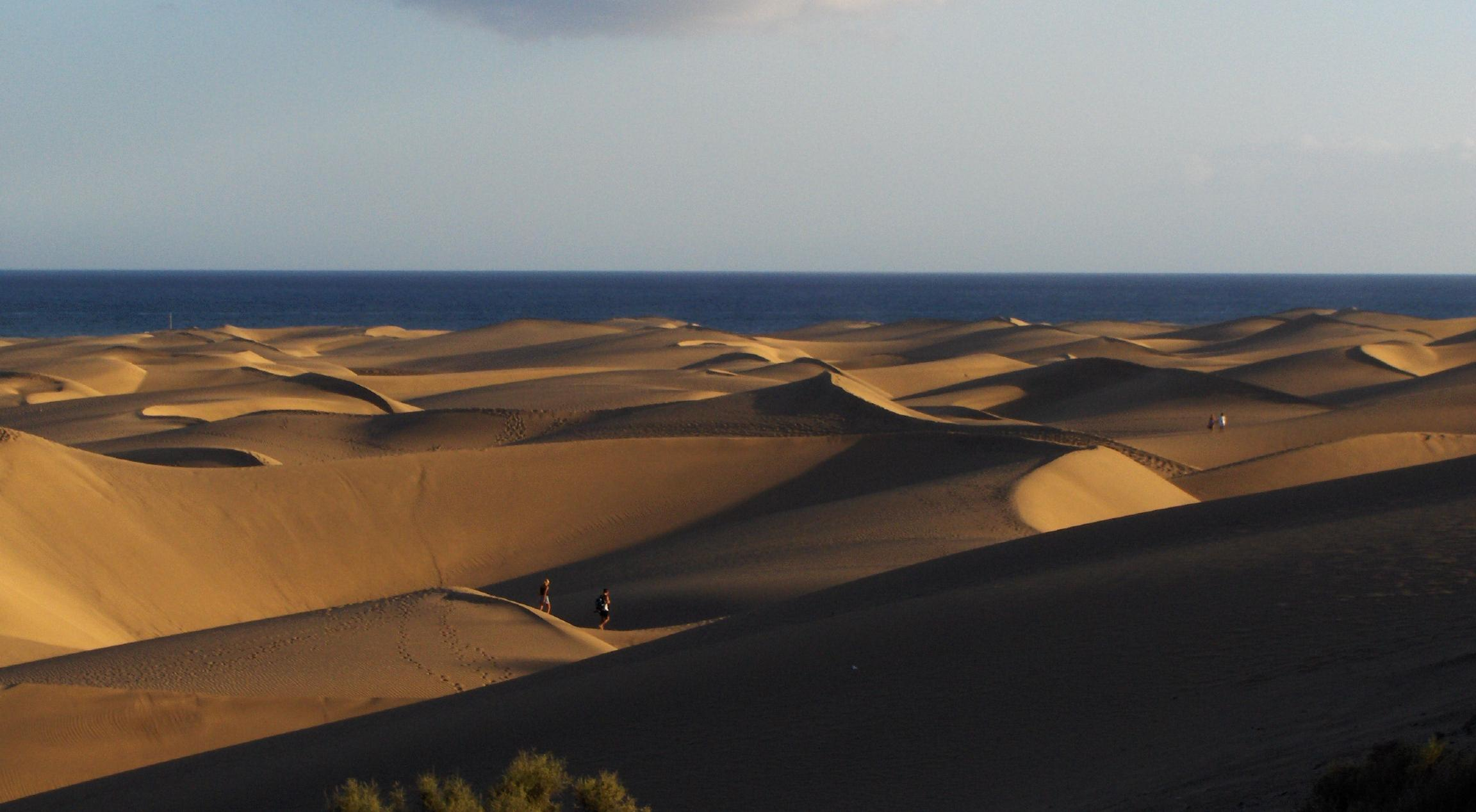
Locations in Gran Canaria (Maspalomas Dunes pictured) were used to double for Morocco.

Principal photography on the film began in February 2016 in London, with the family home located on the corners of Christchurch Hill and Willow Road in Hampstead. Southwark was also used for filming, particularly at Pullens Yard. To keep within budget, many of the film's scenes were shot in a former Gillette factory as, according to VFX supervisor Kevin Baillie, most of the remaining studio space had been occupied by bigger Star Wars and Marvel films. Production designer Gary Freeman coordinated a construction schedule that allowed for the space used for filming a hospital courtyard scene to be redesigned for scenes involving a Soho pub within the span of two days. Studio space at Elstree Studios and LH2 Studios was also used for the London shoot.

Cinematographer Don Burgess stated that all of the more complex scenes for the film were mapped out prior to filming using a style of virtual cinematography, a technique they had used for 2004's The Polar Express. Burgess and Zemeckis elected to break the film down into six specific visual appearances to match the changing tone and settings for the film. In May 2016 scenes set in Casablanca were shot in Gran Canaria, Canary Islands. Freeman stated that filming in the Canary Islands happened as finding locations in Morocco proved a challenge due to the architecture of cities like Casablanca and Tangiers changing significantly since the time period the film is set in. The airfield scenes were shot at RAF Halton that was decorated to look like RAF Hendon during World War II.

For when his character spoke French in the film, Pitt worked with Cotillard to help develop his accent. Cotillard took firearm training for the film, but was never fully comfortable holding the weapon. Filming of the assassination scene was interrupted when Cotillard "freaked out" while handling the weapon. To help with her discomfort, Zemeckis instructed her to put the lock on the machine gun she would use.

=== Costume design ===
Designer and frequent Zemeckis collaborator Joanna Johnston provided the costume design for the film, and was given free rein by Zemeckis on the designs. Due to the quick process of the pre-production, little more than two weeks were available to Johnston for research. She described in an interview that she sought to give the costumes a polished, glossy look. For influence, Johnston paid visits to the Imperial War Museum in London, a practice she had also done when working on other war set films such as Saving Private Ryan, Valkyrie and War Horse; looked at the wardrobes of Golden Age actresses Lauren Bacall, Barbara Stanwyck and Katharine Hepburn, as well as the wardrobes utilized in the films Casablanca and Now, Voyager. Johnston shaped the style of the costumes around the characters, and particular focus was on Marianne, whose clothing altered with the development of the plot. "I wanted her to look very assured in the first part of the film, in Casablanca.", said Johnston, "I looked at a lot of French style and fashion plates from the time, and I made her look very clean and graphic. When she goes to London, she takes on a mantle of being a mother and wife, so I put her in warmer tones. But you never really know who she is."

All of the outfits in the film were custom-made for the cast. The silver cross, worn by Brad Pitt in the film, was also custom-made by London-based jeweller Stephen Einhorn. Several versions of the costumes were made, with eight versions of a long green dress worn by Cotillard in the film being specifically noted.

=== Music ===
The film was scored by Zemeckis' regular collaborator Alan Silvestri in their 16th film together, ever since their collaboration with Romancing the Stone (1984). The album consisted of 13 tracks from Silvestri's score released by Sony Classical Records on November 11, 2016. Silvestri recorded the score at the Abbey Road Studios in London, after filming was wrapped. He did not allude to the period in the score, as "it was not an action score on any level," and while the film is about war, he did not need to play this as a World War II film. He augmented the 80-piece orchestra with electronic music throughout the film and reflected the period through newly recorded versions of 1940s classical songs played with gusto by London big bands.

== Release ==
=== Theatrical release ===
The film had its worldwide premiere on November 9, 2016, at the Regency Village Theatre in Los Angeles. Paramount Pictures released the film on Wednesday, November 23, 2016.

=== Home media ===
Allied was released on Digital HD on February 14, 2017, and on Blu-ray and DVD on February 28, 2017.

== Reception ==
=== Box office ===
Allied grossed $40.1 million in the United States and Canada and $79.4 million in other countries for a worldwide total of $119.5 million, against a net production budget of $85 million. The Hollywood Reporter estimated the film lost the studio $75–90 million, when factoring together all expenses and revenues, and was listed amongst the year's box office flops.

Allied opened alongside Moana, Rules Don't Apply and Bad Santa 2 as well as the wide expansion of Loving and was expected to gross around $15 million in its opening weekend and $20–25 million over its first five days from 3,160 theaters. The film ended up grossing $12.7 million in its opening weekend (a five-day total of $17.7 million), finishing 4th at the box office. It remained in fourth place in its second weekend with a gross of $7 million.

=== Critical response ===
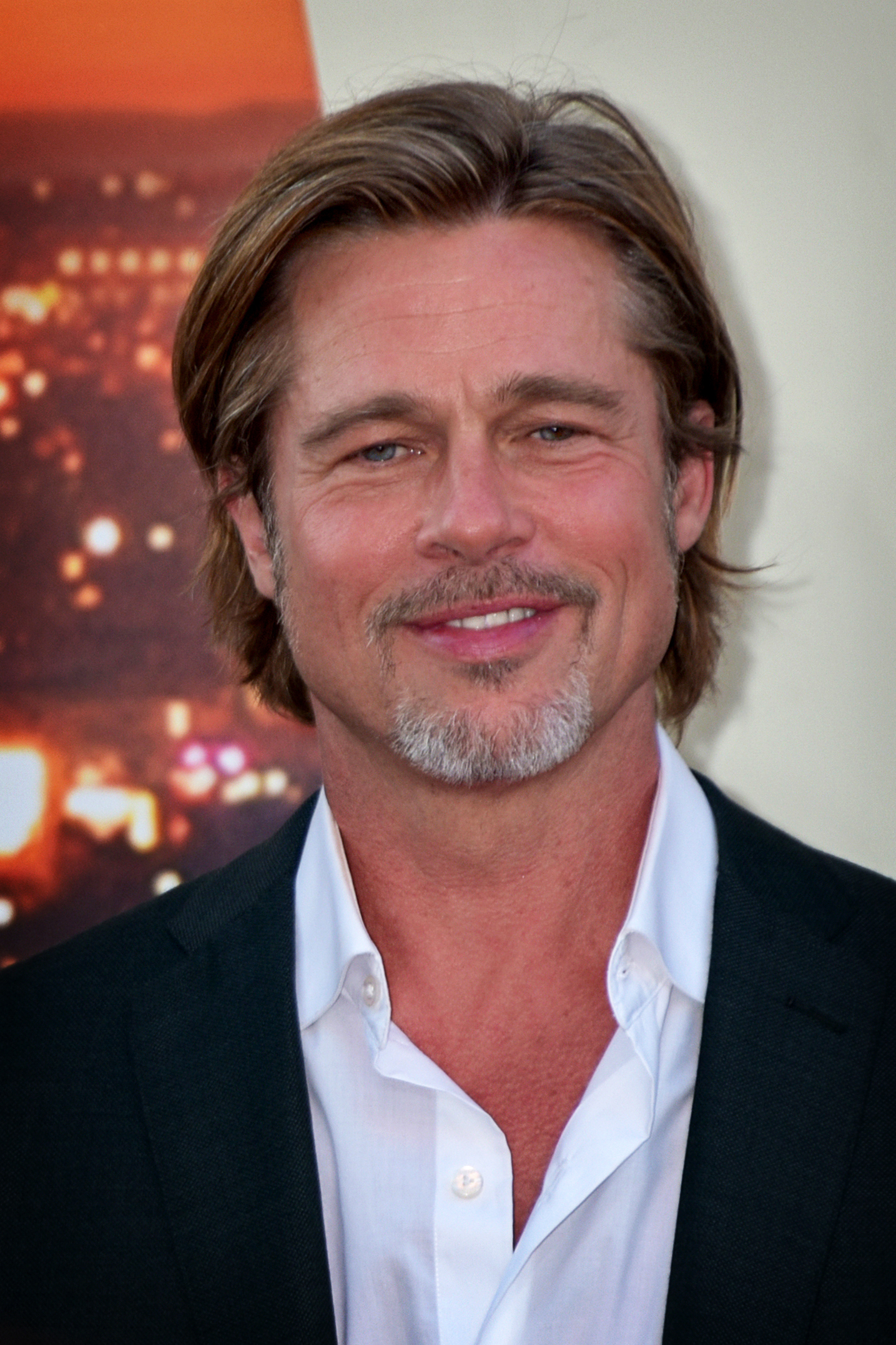
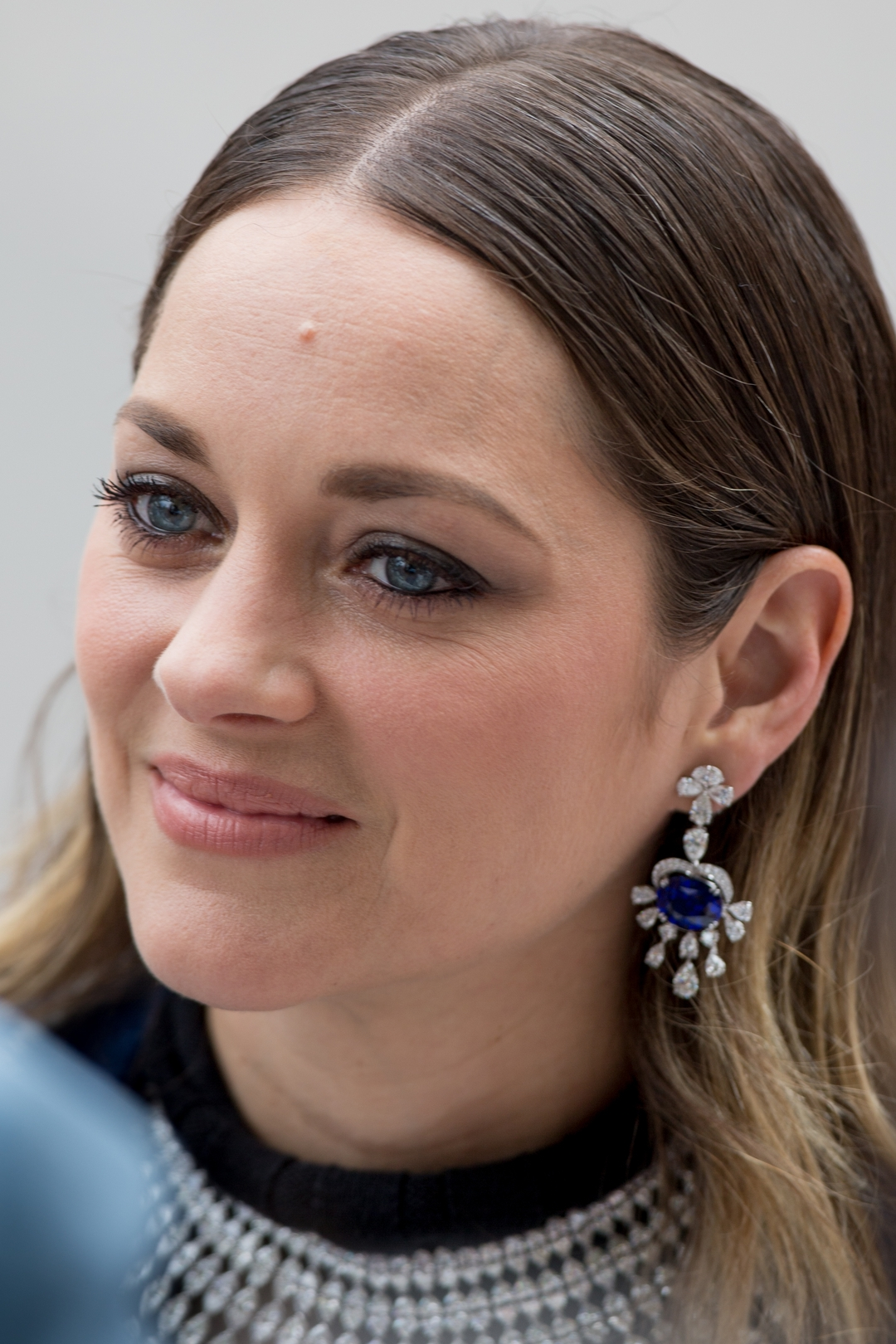
The individual performances of Pitt and Cotillard were given relatively positive reviews, but received mixed reviews for romantic chemistry.

The review aggregate site Rotten Tomatoes gives Allied an approval rating of 60% based on 258 reviews, and a weighted average of 6.20/10. The site's consensus states: "Allied has its moments, but doesn't quite achieve epic wartime romance status—a disappointment made more profound by the dazzling talent assembled on either side of the camera." Metacritic reports a score of 60 out of 100, based on 44 critics. Indicating mixed or average reviews. Audiences polled by CinemaScore gave the film an average grade of "B" on an A+ to F scale, while PostTrak reported filmgoers gave a 79% overall positive score and a 56% "definite recommend".

Stephanie Zacharek of Time stated that "Even within this highly synthetic world, Pitt and Cotillard give sturdy, coded performances that feel naturalistic, not phony: They understand clearly that their chief mission is to tap the tradition of melodrama, and they take it seriously. Somehow, almost incomprehensibly, it all works. Allied looks old but smells new, and the scent is heady." Eric Eisenberg from CinemaBlend gave the film four out of five, praising the performances of Pitt and Cotillard and stating they "prove again why they're two of the best in the business." Rex Reed from The New York Observer gave the film four out of four, writing: "Beautiful, bold and blazing with sex and suspense, Allied is a gorgeously photographed, intensely romantic, action-packed film by the great director Robert Zemeckis with two titanic star performances by Brad Pitt and Marion Cotillard that delivers something for everyone." At Deadline Hollywood, Pete Hammond, in addition to praising the performances, screenplay and direction, gave praise to Alan Silvestri's score, citing it as one of his best works. For RogerEbert.com, Peter Sobcynzki gave the film 4 stars, highlighting the music from Alan Silvestri, the cinematography from Don Burgess and the costume design from Joanna Johnston. In his summary, he wrote, "It is a lovely homage to the kind of entertainment that Hollywood used to put out in the day without breaking a sweat, while still strong and sure enough to work on viewers who have never seen any of the films to which it pays tribute."

Conversely, The Pittsburgh Post-Gazette's Gary Rotstein wrote that notwithstanding "so many shared plot references [to] Casablanca", while that film is "among the greatest films of all time ... the other is about as flat as one of those WWII wall maps on which swastikas denote all the German-occupied parts of Europe". Peter Bradshaw, in his 2 star review for The Guardian, cited the film as "arduous" and the script as "an unconvincing and sluggish pastiche of a war movie". He also wrote critically of Pitt and Cotillard's chemistry, comparing them to "thesp robots from Westworld with some kind of Google Translate chip implanted in their heads". David Rooney of The Hollywood Reporter was also critical of Pitt and Cotillard's chemistry, stating "neither Pitt nor Cotillard is terribly persuasive at conveying the smoldering passions that catch Max and Marianne off guard after their initially circumspect interactions". This tied into his criticisms of Knight's screenplay, which he referred to as "flaccid". Oliver Lyttleton of The Playlist shared similar sentiments about the script, finding any aspect of Knight's script that appeared to focus on the characters and deceit of the situation to be "constantly undermined by the actual execution". Lyttleton was also critical of the visual effects and the third act of the film, drawing a comparison of "malevolently" splicing scenes of Michael Bay's Pearl Harbor into Alfred Hitchcock's Notorious. Robert Abele of TheWrap thought about the screenplay "Screenwriter Knight fumbles with the plot’s emotional impulses and ticking plot requirements, with neither holding ground long enough to give the movie momentum." Abele was also critical of the lead performances and their chemistry, referring to Pitt as "miscast" and finding Cotillard ill-fitting for her role.

=== Accolades ===
List of awards and nominations
Award	Date of ceremony	Category	Recipients	Result	Ref.
Academy Awards	February 26, 2017	Best Costume Design	Joanna Johnston	Nominated	
British Academy Film Awards	February 12, 2017	Best Costume Design	Joanna Johnston	Nominated	
Critics' Choice Movie Awards	December 11, 2016	Best Costume Design	Joanna Johnston	Nominated	
Jupiter Awards	March 29, 2017	Best International Actor	Brad Pitt	Nominated	
Satellite Awards	February 19, 2017	Best Art Direction and Production Design	Gary Freeman	Nominated	
Satellite Awards	February 19, 2017	Best Sound	Allied	Nominated	
Saturn Awards	June 28, 2017	Best Action or Adventure Film	Allied	Nominated	
Visual Effects Society Awards	February 7, 2017	Outstanding Supporting Visual Effects in a Photoreal Feature	Kevin Baillie, Brennan Doyle, Viktor Muller, Sandra Scott, and Richard Van Den Bergh	Nominated	
Women Film Critics Circle	December 19, 2016	Best Screen Couple	Allied	Nominated	
Women Film Critics Circle	December 19, 2016	Best Equality of the Sexes	Allied	Nominated	
