= Pullens buildings =

Coordinates: 51.4894°N 0.1005°W

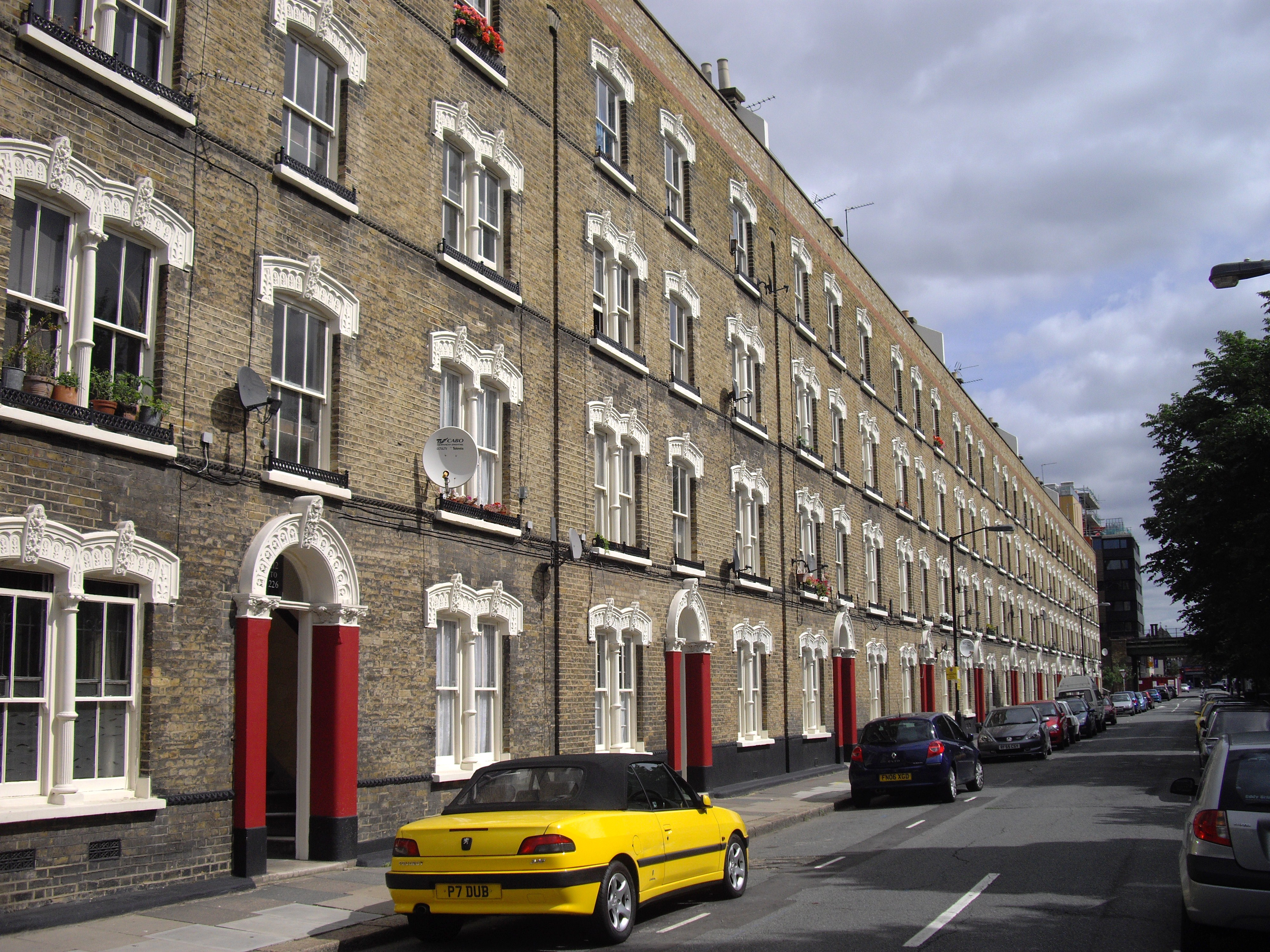
Pullens buildings

The Pullens Buildings, also known as the Pullens Estate, are some of the last Victorian tenement buildings surviving in London, England. In the Walworth, Newington area, they are near Elephant and Castle and Kennington Underground stations. Located in Amelia Street, Crampton Street, Iliffe Street, Penton Place and Peacock Street, they are protected by Conservation Area status granted by Southwark Council.

== History ==
=== Construction ===
The Pullens Estate was built by James Pullen, a local builder, who acquired the land and developed it over a 15-year period from 1886.

The residential buildings are four storeys in height, and each unit is three bays wide with an ornate central entrance to a common stairwell. The ranges vary from three to twelve units in length. They are faced with yellow stock brick, the front being enriched with the use of decorative terracotta arches to the door and window openings. The roofs are flat, providing amenity space for the residents.

The workshops attached to the rear of the residential blocks (buildings) are simpler and more "functional" in appearance. They are two storeys high, and also built of stock brick and flat-roofed. The two-storey loading bays are edged with blue brick quoins. The shops, flanking the entrances to the workshop yards, have traditional painted timber shopfronts, with pilasters supporting a fascia and cornice, and stallrisers. Flats in the buildings were originally connected to the workshops by internal doors which have since been bricked up.

The first block of 16 flats was built on Penton Place without the required consent of the Metropolitan Board of Works but Pullen managed to persuade local officials that his work was good and continued building until 1901 – ten years more than had been permitted.

When the philanthropist Charles Booth was surveying London for his poverty map in 1899 he encountered Mr Pullen at work describing him thus: 'Old Mr Pullen in a top hat and fustian suit was on a scaffolding superintending'. Booth stated that demand for the 'well built' flats was high and they were 'Occupied before the paper is dry on the walls' often by police officers from Whitehall and Lambeth districts.

The rent was 'eight shillings for three rooms, kitchen and scullery, plus 6 pence a week charged for cleaning the stairs and gas'. Booth noted that each had to make a deposit of 24 shillings, which was an effectual bar to any poor tenants. However, records indicate that some tenants sublet rooms within the flats to destitute families. For example, in summer 1896, Charlie Chaplin (aged 7), his mother and elder brother lived in a sublet room on the estate immediately prior to their admission to the Newington Workhouse.

The full estate, which originally extended southwards as far as Manor Place, comprised 684 dwellings in 12 blocks. Attached to the rear of the dwellings, arranged round four yards, were 106 workshops. The estate's shops were located at the entrances to the workshop yards.

=== Late 20th-century threat of demolition and squatting campaign ===
In the 1970s, the council planned to demolish the buildings but were stopped in the 1980s by an alliance of tenants and squatters under the umbrella of the Pullens Squatter Organisation who with the full support of the Residents' Association campaigned and fought successfully to save them with a campaign of direct action and solidarity which eventually ended up constructing barricades to stop police and bailiffs entering the buildings.

=== Contemporary ===
Many of the remaining 351 flats in the buildings are local authority-owned but just under 50 per cent are now in private leasehold ownership and prices have risen sharply, boosted by the re-development plan for the Elephant and Castle area and an interest in the period style of the construction. In 2007 a Pullens flat on Iliffe Street sold for £305,000 another on Crampton Street for £295,000. In 2014 in Iliffe Street a property sold for £365,000. In 2009, the local authority freeholder, Southwark, completed a major refurbishment of the buildings. In 2014 another major refurbishment is on the cards. In 2015 a Pullens flat on Peacock Street sold for £427,500, another on Iliffe Street for £435,000.

Of the original four Pullens Yards, the Clements Yard, Iliffe Yard and Peacock Yard still remain. They are still in use and house a variety of workers including potters, a lute maker, architects, dressmakers and jewellery designers. The yards are open to the public twice yearly to promote the independent traders.

The Estate also is home to a number of small shops including 56a Infoshop – an anarchist bookshop and self-managed social centre formed out of the squatted ex-grocery turned wholefoods shop next door in the 1990s and Fareshares – the wholefoods shop.

== Popular culture ==
The historic and architectural importance of the buildings has been recognised by their use in several high-profile films including The King's Speech, Spider, Hereafter and Allied.
