= The Good Doctors =

2009 book by John Dittmer

- Author: John Dittmer
- Publication date: 2009
- ISBN: 9781608191857

The Good Doctors: The Medical Committee for Human Rights and the Struggle for Social Justice in Health Care is a 2009 non-fiction book by historian John Dittmer. The book documents the history of the Medical Committee for Human Rights (MCHR), a group of health professionals who delivered health care to wounded protesters and victims of police violence during the Civil Rights Movement and the anti-war movement in the United States in the 1960s, at a time when the health care system in the South was still segregated.

== Synopsis ==
Physician Walter Lear founded the Medical Committee for Civil Rights (MCCR) in 1963 to address the entrenched racism in the policies of the American Medical Association (AMA) which enabled Southern states to deny African American physicians the same rights as whites. The group originally protested the AMA in Atlantic City in 1963, but widened their reach when hundreds of health professionals representing MCCR participated in the August 1963 March on Washington for Jobs and Freedom.

Out of this momentum, a new group, the Medical Committee for Human Rights (MCHR) was created in 1964 by Tom Levin, who was asked by the Student Nonviolent Coordinating Committee (SNCC) to organize a group of health care workers to support activists during Freedom Summer in Mississippi, a ten-week effort to register disfranchised African American voters. MCHR was needed because there were few black physicians and whites would not treat the injuries of civil rights activists in Mississippi.

MCHR made several discoveries while supporting activists during the Freedom Summer. They found that the public health system for African Americans was virtually nonexistent in Mississippi. Due to segregation, white physicians would not treat black patients. Most blacks had received almost no health care, and most had never visited a doctor. With access to health care so limited, MCHR was imbued with a new purpose. They became a permanent organization and founded field offices. Soon after, community health care clinics began to emerge. MCHR expanded from Mississippi into Alabama and Louisiana. Their mission expanded further, treating veterans from the Vietnam War for PTSD, and calling for a non-profit national health care system.
