= Artois =

Region of northern France

Coordinates: 50°30′N 2°30′E

Government of Artois Gouvernment d'Artois
- 1764–1790
- Flag

- Location of Artois in France (1789 borders)
- Capital: Arras
- Demonym: Artesians (French: Artésiens)
- Government
  - Type: Province
- King of France
  - 1764–1774: Louis XV
  - 1774–1790: Louis XVI
- Governor of Artois
  - 1764–1787: François Gaston de Lévis
  - 1788–1789: Adrien-Louis de Bonnières
- Historical era: Early Modern
  - County created: 1764
  - Disestablished: 1790
Preceded by	Succeeded by
French Flanders	Pas-de-Calais
- Today part of: France

Artois (/ɑːrˈtwɑː/ ar-TWAH, French: [aʁtwɑ]; Dutch: Artesië; Picard: Artoé; English adjective: Artesian) is a region of northern France. Its territory covers an area of about 4,000 km^{2} and it has a population of about one million. Its principal cities include Arras (Dutch: Atrecht), Saint-Omer, Lens, and Béthune. It is the eponym for the term Artesian.

== Location ==
Artois occupies the interior of the Pas-de-Calais département, the western part of which constitutes the former Boulonnais. Artois roughly corresponds to the arrondissements of Arras, Béthune, Saint Omer, and Lens, and the eastern part of the arrondissement of Montreuil. It occupies the western end of the coalfield which stretches eastward through the neighbouring Nord département and across central Belgium.

== History ==
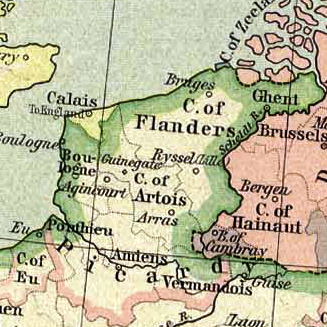
Location of the County of Artois in the 15th century

Originally a feudal county itself, Artois was annexed by the county of Flanders. It came to France in 1180 as a dowry of a Flemish princess, Isabelle of Hainaut, and was again made a separate county in 1237 for Robert, a grandson of Isabelle. Through inheritance, Artois came under the rule of the dukes of Burgundy in 1384. At the death of the fourth duke, Charles the Bold, Artois was inherited by the Habsburgs and passed to the dynasty's Spanish line. After the religious revolts of 1566 in the Netherlands, Artois briefly entered the Dutch Revolt in 1576, participating in the Pacification of Ghent until it formed the Union of Atrecht in 1579.

After the Union of Atrecht, Artois and Hainaut (Dutch: Henegouwen) reached a separate agreement with Philip II. Artois remained with the Spanish Netherlands until it was conquered by France during the Franco-Spanish War. The annexation was acknowledged during the Treaty of the Pyrenees in 1659, and it became a French province. Artois had already been largely French-speaking, but it was part of the Southern Netherlands until the French annexation.

Artois experienced rapid industrial development during the second half of the 19th century, fueled by its rich coal resources. During World War I, the front line between the opposing Central Powers and Allied armies in France ran through the province, resulting in enormous physical damage. Since the second half of the 20th century, Artois has suffered along with nearby areas because of the decline of the coal industry.

== Notable residents ==
- Pierre-Charles Le Sueur (c. 1657 – c. 1705), born in Artois, noted explorer and trader.
- Maximilien Robespierre (1758–1794), French revolutionary leader, born in Arras
- Carolus Clusius (1526–1609), early botanist
- Robert-François Damiens (1715–1757), failed regicide, born in La Thieuloye

== See also ==
- Artesian well
- Battle of Artois (disambiguation)
- Communauté d'agglomération de l'Artois
- Countess of Artois
- Counts of Artois
- County of Artois
- List of World War I memorials and cemeteries in Artois
- Weald-Artois Anticline, a ridge that connected continental Europe and Britain until 225,000 years ago
