= Reassuringly Expensive =

Advertising slogan for Stella Artois

Reassuringly Expensive was the advertising slogan for Stella Artois in the United Kingdom from 1982 until 2007. The 1990s UK television advertising campaigns became known for their distinctive style of imitating European cinema and their leitmotif taken from the score of Jean de Florette, inspired, in turn, by Giuseppe Verdi's La forza del destino. The TV campaigns began in 1991 with a series of adverts based on Jean de Florette, directed by the British duo Anthea Benton and Vaughan Arnell, moving on to other genres including war movies, silent comedy and even surrealism (for which the slogan was changed to "Reassuringly Elephants"). They have used notable movie directors such as Jonathan Glazer, and their aim was to portray the drink in a context of sophisticated European culture.

== History ==
The "Reassuringly Expensive" campaign began in 1982. Frank Lowe of Collett Dickenson Pearce worked on marketing for Stella Artois in the 1970s, creating print campaigns such as "My shout, he whispered". In 1981, Lowe left Collett Dickenson Pearce to form his own advertising agency, taking with him the Stella Artois account. Within a year, Lowe launched the "Reassuringly Expensive" campaign, which aimed to turn a substantial negative for the brand (higher prices due to greater Duty on high-alcohol content beverages in the United Kingdom) into a positive, assuring customers that by being more expensive, the premium lager was better than cheaper brands. Earlier pieces were primarily print campaigns, but in 1990, a chance viewing of Jean de Florette led one of Lowe's creative directors to pen a script based on a similar concept. The resulting television and cinema advertisement, Jacques de Florette, proved immensely popular and formed the basis for a series of six award-winning adverts produced between 1991 and 2001. Good Doctor was announced in February 2002 as the seventh in the series.

During 2007, the "reassuringly expensive" slogan was dropped, and the word "Stella" has been avoided in the advertisements. This has been seen as a reaction to the lager's perceived connection with aggression and binge-drinking in the United Kingdom, where it is nicknamed "wife beater".

== Jacques de Florette ==
Jacques de Florette was the first of the Reassuringly Expensive series. It was directed by Michael Seresin, the cinematographer on Bugsy Malone and Midnight Express, and was shown in 1991.

== Good Doctor ==
Good Doctor (also credited as Doctor or Plague) is a television and cinema advertisement released in 2002 by Interbrew to promote its Stella Artois brand of lager within the United Kingdom. The 100-second spot, involving a doctor treating victims of cholera and being shunned by the villagers until a priest demands that he be given a Stella Artois, was produced by advertising agency Lowe Lintas & Partners in London. Good Doctor premiered on British television in January 2002, with later appearances in cinemas. It is the seventh piece in the Jean de Florette-inspired "Reassuringly Expensive" series that had been running since 1992. The commercial was a popular, financial, and critical success, boosting sales during the period in which it ran, and receiving more awards than any other campaign in 2002, including a Cannes Gold Lion, an Epica Award and several prizes from the D&AD Awards.
