= Artesian =

Artesian may refer to:

- Someone from the County of Artois
- Artesian aquifer, a source of water
- Artesian Builds, a former computer building company
- Artesian, South Dakota, United States
- Great Artesian Basin, Australia
- The Artesian Hotel, a casino and spa in Sulphur, Oklahoma
- 296819 Artesian, an asteroid
