= Artois Bock =

Specialty beer brewed by InBev

Artois Bock was a speciality beer, brewed by InBev, and first sold in May 2005 based upon a recipe dating from 1892. It was brewed in a "Bock" style and was 6.2% ABV.

The beer was phased out following the launch of the new Eiken Artois in 2008, in a revamp of the "Artois Family" brand to try to stem falling sales. Eiken Artois was itself withdrawn from sale later in 2008.

== See also ==
- Stella Artois, a pale lager beer sold in both 5% and 4% ABV versions.
- Peeterman Artois, a 4% wheat-based lager withdrawn in December 2008
