= Peeterman Artois =

Peeterman Artois was a wheat-based 4% ABV global lager first brewed in Belgium. It is brewed by InBev. It was named after St. Peeter, the patron saint of Leuven in Belgium where the Artois brewery is based. It was launched alongside Beck's Vier as a mid-strength beer to capitalise on the trend towards weaker strength lagers, as opposed to Stella Artois at 5.2% and standard Beck's at 5%. In December 2008, InBev announced it would withdraw Peeterman Artois (and Eiken Artois) in favour of a 4% version of Stella Artois.

== See also ==
- Stella Artois, a pale lager beer sold in both 5% and 4% ABV versions.
- Artois Bock, a 6.2% 'brown' beer withdrawn in January 2008
