= HMS Artois =

Two ships of the Royal Navy have borne the name HMS Artois. The name entered the navy with the capture of the French frigate Artois:

- HMS Artois (1780) was a 40-gun fifth rate captured from the French in 1780 and sold in 1786.
- HMS Artois (1794) was a 38-gun fifth rate launched in 1794 and wrecked in 1797.
