= Wife-beater =

Wife-beater, wifebeater, or wife beater is a slang term for a person who commits domestic violence against their wife or long-term female partner. It also commonly refers to a type of sleeveless shirt.

Wife-beater, wifebeater, or wife beater may also refer to:

== People ==
- Matt Prince, (born 1973) a professional wrestler whose ring name is Wifebeater
- Chris Spradlin, (born 1979) a professional wrestler whose former ring name was Wife Beater
- Sickie Wifebeater, stage name of the Mentors' guitarist Eric Carls (born 1958)

== Other uses ==
- A type of sleeveless shirt
- Wife Beater (EP), by American metalcore band The Plot in You
- Rum, made from sugarcane, sometimes called "the golden wifebeater"
- Stella Artois, a beer sometimes called "Wife Beater" in the UK
