= Battle of Artois =

The Battle of Artois is the name of three battles fought in the Artois region of northern France during World War I:

- First Battle of Artois (December 1914 – January 1915), an early and indecisive encounter
- Second Battle of Artois (9–15 May 1915), French attack towards Vimy Ridge
- Third Battle of Artois (25 September – 15 October 1915), also known as the Artois-Loos Offensive
