= Stella Artois =

Belgian pilsner beer

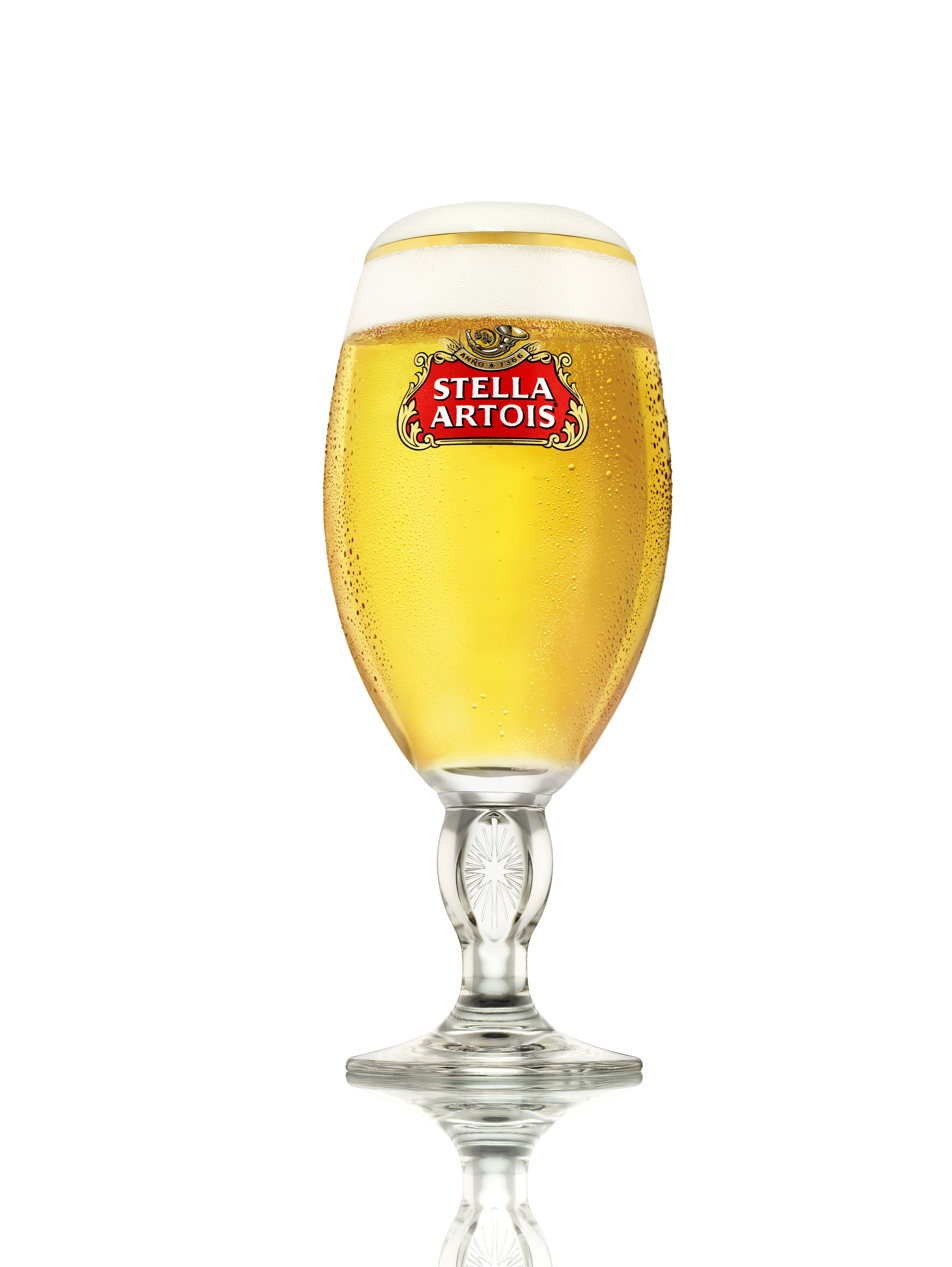
- Type: Beer
- Manufacturer: Anheuser–Busch InBev
- Origin: Belgium, Leuven, Belgium
- Introduced: 1926; 100 years ago
- Alcohol by volume: 4.6–5.2%
- Style: Pilsner
- Ingredients: Saaz hops, malted barley, maize, yeast, water
- Website: stellaartois.com

Stella Artois (/ɑːrˈtwɑː/ ar-TWAH, French: [aʁtwɑ]) is a pilsner beer, first brewed in 1926 by Brouwerij Artois in Leuven, Belgium. In its original form, the beer is 5.2 per cent ABV, the country's standard for pilsners. The beer is sold in many EU countries, but also in the US, UK, Canada and Australia, where it has a reduced ABV. Stella Artois is owned by Interbrew International B.V. which is a subsidiary of the world's largest brewer, Anheuser-Busch InBev SA/NV.

== History ==
Stella Artois branding prominently features the date 1366. According to the Stella Artois website, this is when "a tradition of brewing beer had been established in Leuven, Belgium." The Dutch website biernet.nl reports that the Den Hoorn brewery in Leuven "certainly existed" by 1366, as a record of excise duties from that year are on record at the city register. However, the Stella Artois website reports that the first clear reference to the Den Hoorn brewery in Leuven is 100 years later, from 1466. Sébastien Artois, the brand's namesake, first began apprenticing there as brewmaster in the Leuven Brewer's Guild under brewer Jacob de Bruyn in 1708, and then purchased the brewery in 1717. Artois changed the name of the brewery to Brouwerij Artois but retained the hunting horn in the logo.

Stella Artois beer was first brewed in October 1925 under the code name 'X' and then launched the following January as "Stella Artois," named after the Christmas star and marketed as a Christmas beer. First sold in the winter season, it eventually became available year-round, with exports into the broad European market commencing in 1930, though it did not reach the entire market until 1964. Production was halted for a period when operations were suspended during World War II. By 1960, about 400 million litres (100 million US gallons) of Stella Artois were being produced annually. Whitbread secured a licence to brew Stella Artois under contract in the United Kingdom in 1976.

In 1988, Brouwerij Artois was a founding member in the merger creating Interbrew. That year, Taylorbrands founder David Taylor created a new package design, bottle design, and shape. The original 1926 bottle label inspired the design, which replaced a 1960s design. The design incorporates the horn symbol and the 1366 date of the original Den Hoorn brewery. The label also shows medals for excellence awarded to Brouwerij Artois at a number of trade exhibitions in Belgium in the 19th and 20th centuries. The name Stella Artois is held within a cartouche which was influenced by the style of Belgian architecture in Leuven.

In 1993, Interbrew moved production of Stella Artois into a new, fully automated brewery in Leuven. In 2004, Interbrew was part of the merger creating InBev, and by 2006, total annual production volume of Stella Artois exceeded one billion litres.

In 2008, InBev was part of the merger creating the Anheuser-Busch InBev (AB InBev) brewery company. That same year, a lower-alcohol version, Stella Artois 4%, was introduced in the UK market. In 2011, a cider, Stella Artois Cidre, was launched.

In 2020, AB InBev reduced the alcohol content of their beers for the UK market, from 4.8% to 4.6%. The original UK strength of Stella Artois was 5.2% and 4.8% from 2008 until 2020. According to Freddy Delvaux, former head of the in-house laboratory, the Belgian version was 33 IBU when he joined the lab in 1973, compared to just 20 IBU in 2014.

== Production ==
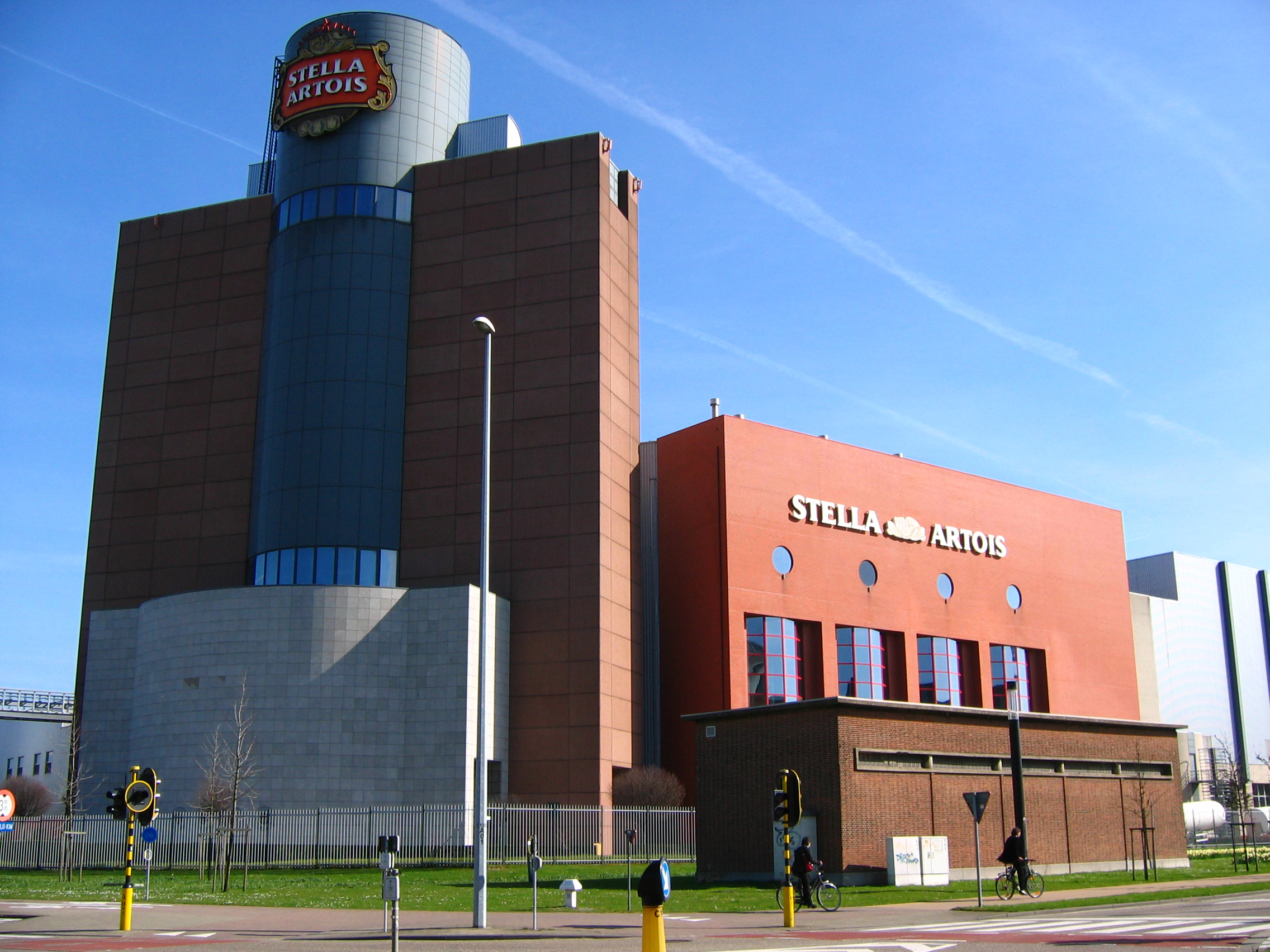
Stella Artois brewery in Leuven

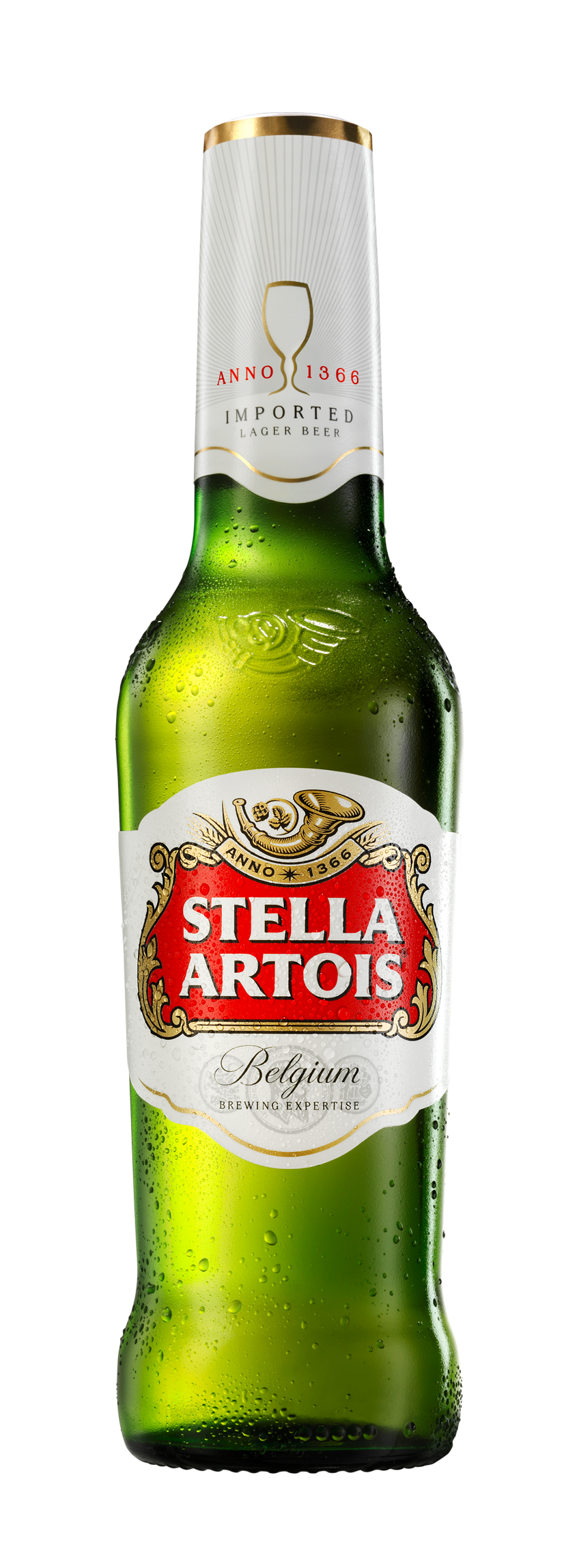
The global bottle of Stella Artois

Stella Artois is brewed in Belgium (in the plants at Leuven and Jupille), at Samlesbury and Magor in the United Kingdom, as well as in other countries. Much of the beer exported from Europe is produced at InBev's brewery in Belgium, and packaged in the Beck's Brewery in Bremen, Germany. Stella Artois is also brewed for the Australian market by Lion. In the United States, Stella Artois is brewed and distributed by Anheuser-Busch at its various brewing facilities in the US, beginning in 2021 and before then it was imported. For the Hungarian market, Stella Artois is brewed in Bőcs, Hungary, by Borsod Brewery, under licence from InBev. For the Canadian market is brewed by Labatt Brewery in Ontario, Canada.

Stella Artois is available on draught and in several packaged sizes.

An alcohol-free variant of Stella Artois was launched in the UK in 2020 and the US in 2021.

An unfiltered version was introduced to the United Kingdom market in 2022.

In 2026, a limited edition "strawberries and cream" flavoured beer was launched in the United Kingdom to coincide with the 2026 Wimbledon Championships.

== Marketing ==
=== Advertising campaigns ===
==== United Kingdom ====
Initially, brewers Whitbread launched Stella in the UK with advertisements featuring the slogan "Stella's for the fellas who take their lager strong". The images showed a Stella-monogrammed half-pint glass (due to its strength) – in one advertisement with a muscular 'glass arm' for a handle, in the other a glass sitting beside a torn-in-half telephone directory. This was the same creative unit which was involved, at the time, in Whitbread's launch of Trophy Bitter "The pint that thinks it's a quart".

In the 1980s and 1990s, the Stella Artois advertising slogan in the United Kingdom was "Reassuringly Expensive". The UK television advertising campaigns became known for their distinctive style of imitating European cinema and their leitmotiv inspired by Giuseppe Verdi's La forza del destino. The campaigns began with a series of advertisements based on the 1986 French film Jean de Florette, directed by the British duo Anthea Benton and Vaughan Arnell, moving on to other genres, including war films, silent comedy and surrealism. They have used notable film directors such as Jonathan Glazer. Furthermore, the brand makes extensive use of the French language in its advertising campaigns, even though the beer brand originates from the monolingual Dutch-speaking city of Leuven. An example of this can be seen in the advertising campaign for Stella Artois Cidre, in which the tag-line "C'est cidre, not cider" is used, although this cider is produced in Zonhoven, which also lies in the Dutch-speaking Flemish Region.

Stella Artois is advertised as containing "only 4 ingredients: hops, malted barley, maize and water". Yeast is also an ingredient used in the fermentation process, but almost all of it is removed before packaging. Since 2009, Stella Artois has been suitable for vegans, as isinglass (fish bladder) is no longer used to remove trace amounts of yeast.

=== Sponsorship ===
==== Film and cinema ====
Stella Artois has been associated with film in the UK since 1994, organising events, sponsoring television, and hosting a website.. Stella Artois has been or is a primary sponsor of the Cannes, Melbourne, and Sundance film festivals, the Independent Spirit Awards, the Dallas International Film Festival, and the Little Rock Film Festival.

==== Sport ====
Stella Artois is the sponsor of a number of tennis tournaments; including the Wimbledon Championships, the Canadian Open, the US Open, the French Open, and the Australian Open.

Stella Artois has also broadcast several Super Bowl ads, as part of Anheuser–Busch InBev's overall ad buys during the game. The brand made its debut during Super Bowl XLV in 2011, in an ad starring Adrien Brody. The commercial was heavily criticised in the Belgian media for giving the impression that the beer is French.

Since 2015, Stella Artois has been the official beer and cider brand for Ascot Racecourse.

==== Other ====
Stella Artois is the official sponsor of the Trifecta Food Truck and Music Festival, which takes place annually in Timonium, Maryland, United States.

=== Charity partnerships ===
Stella Artois has an ongoing partnership with charity Water.org, to help give those in developing countries access to clean water. In 2018, Stella Artois supported Water.org's 'Buy A Lady a Drink' (BALAD) programme, which was co-founded by Hollywood actor Matt Damon and aimed to provide 3.5 million people, particularly women with families in the third world, with long-term access to clean water by 2020.

=== Fashion collaborations ===
Since 2021, Stella Artois has entered into collaborations with clothing company Palace, producing several capsule collections based on the themes of tennis and British pub culture.

== Brand image ==
At least since the late 20th century, Stella Artois has carried the nickname of the "wife beater" in the United Kingdom, because of a perceived connection between binge drinking involving the brand and domestic violence against women. In January 2012, the online activities of AB InBev lobbyists Portland Communications were exposed in the United Kingdom when Tom Watson, a member of the Labour opposition party, said that the company (then owned by Tim Allan, a former advisor to ex-Prime Minister Tony Blair) was trying to remove references to Stella Artois from Wikipedia's "wife beater" disambiguation page and the phrase "wife beater" from the article on the brand.

== See also ==
- Artois Bock
- Beer and breweries by region
- Peeterman Artois
