= Gotham Independent Film Audience Award =

American film award

- Country: United States
- Presented by: The Gotham Film & Media Institute
- First award: 2010

The Gotham Independent Film Audience Award is one of the annual Gotham Independent Film Awards and was first awarded in 2010. From 2010 to 2013, the winner was determined by the independent film community and film fans via an online vote. Since 2014, the members of the awarding organization, the Gotham Film & Media Institute (formerly known as the Independent Filmmaker Project), vote to choose the winner. The award was not given betweeen 2020 and 2026.

== Nomination eligibility ==
From 2010 to 2013, the five nominees were selected in a first round of online voting from American films that had won an audience award at an American or Canadian film festival in the previous year. From 2014 to 2020, the nominees were the films nominated for Best Feature, Best Documentary, and Breakthrough Director. In 2020, the nominees for the newly created award for Best International Feature were also nominated for this award. In 2026, the eight nominated films were "curated from films submitted to [the Gotham Awards] for consideration, measured by opening-weekend per-theater average against the highest-rated and most-watched films of 2026, as reported in box office tracking and on Letterboxd."

== Winners and nominees ==
=== 2010s ===
Year	Film	Director(s)	Ref.
2010	Waiting for "Superman"	Davis Guggenheim	
2010	9000 Needles	Doug Dearth	
2010	Brotherhood	Will Canon	
2010	Winter's Bone	Debra Granik	
2010	White Irish Drinkers	John Gray	
2011	Girlfriend	Justin Lerner	
2011	Being Elmo: A Puppeteer's Journey	Constance Marks	
2011	Buck	Cindy Meehl	
2011	The First Grader	Justin Chadwick	
2011	Wild Horse, Wild Ride	Alex Dawson and Greg Gricus	
2012	Artifact	Jared Leto	
2012	Beasts of the Southern Wild	Benh Zeitlin	
2012	Burn	Tom Putnam and Brenna Sanchez	
2012	The Invisible War	Kirby Dick	
2012	Once in a Lullaby: The PS 22 Chorus Story	Jonathan Kalafer	
2013	Jake Shimabukuro: Life on Four Strings	Tadashi Nakamura	
2013	12 Years a Slave	Steve McQueen	
2013	Best Kept Secret	Samantha Buck	
2013	Don't Stop Believin': Everyman's Journey	Ramona Diaz	
2013	Fruitvale Station	Ryan Coogler	
2014	Boyhood	Richard Linklater	
2014	Actress	Robert Greene	
2014	Birdman	Alejandro G. Iñárritu	
2014	Citizenfour	Laura Poitras	
2014	Coherence	James Ward Byrkit	
2014	Dear White People	Justin Simien	
2014	A Girl Walks Home Alone at Night	Ana Lily Amirpour	
2014	The Grand Budapest Hotel	Wes Anderson	
2014	It Felt Like Love	Eliza Hittman	
2014	Life Itself	Steve James	
2014	Love Is Strange	Ira Sachs	
2014	Manakamana	Stephanie Spray and Pacho Velez	
2014	Nightcrawler	Dan Gilroy	
2014	Point and Shoot	Marshall Curry	
2014	Under the Skin	Jonathan Glazer	
2015	Tangerine	Sean Baker	
2015	Approaching the Elephant	Amanda Wilder	
2015	Appropriate Behavior	Desiree Akhavan	
2015	Carol	Todd Haynes	
2015	Cartel Land	Matthew Heineman	
2015	The Diary of a Teenage Girl	Marielle Heller	
2015	Heart of a Dog	Laurie Anderson	
2015	Heaven Knows What	Ben Safdie and Joshua Safdie	
2015	Listen to Me Marlon	Stevan Riley	
2015	The Look of Silence	Joshua Oppenheimer	
2015	The Mend	John Magary	
2015	Mediterranea	Jonas Carpignano	
2015	Spotlight	Tom McCarthy	
2015	James White	Josh Mond	
2016	Moonlight	Barry Jenkins	
2016	Cameraperson	Kirsten Johnson	
2016	Certain Women	Kelly Reichardt	
2016	Everybody Wants Some!!	Richard Linklater	
2016	The Fits	Anna Rose Holmer	
2016	I Am Not Your Negro	Raoul Peck	
2016	Krisha	Trey Edward Shults	
2016	Manchester by the Sea	Kenneth Lonergan	
2016	O.J.: Made in America	Ezra Edelman	
2016	Paterson	Jim Jarmusch	
2016	Southside with You	Richard Tanne	
2016	Swiss Army Man	Daniel Kwan and Daniel Scheinert	
2016	Tower	Keith Maitland	
2016	Weiner	Josh Kriegman and Elyse Steinberg	
2016	The Witch	Robert Eggers	
2017	Get Out	Jordan Peele	
2017	Call Me by Your Name	Luca Guadagnino	
2017	Columbus	Kogonada	
2017	Ex Libris: The New York Public Library	Frederick Wiseman	
2017	The Florida Project	Sean Baker	
2017	Good Time	Ben Safdie and Joshua Safdie	
2017	I, Tonya	Craig Gillespie	
2017	Lady Bird	Greta Gerwig	
2017	Menashe	Joshua Z Weinstein	
2017	Novitiate	Maggie Betts	
2017	Rat Film	Theo Anthony	
2017	Strong Island	Yance Ford	
2017	Whose Streets?	Sabaah Folayan and Damon Davis	
2017	The Work	Jairus McLeary and Gethin Aldous	
2018	Won't You Be My Neighbor?	Morgan Neville	
2018	Bisbee '17	Robert Greene	
2018	Eighth Grade	Bo Burnham	
2018	The Favourite	Yorgos Lanthimos	
2018	First Reformed	Paul Schrader	
2018	Hale County This Morning, This Evening	RaMell Ross	
2018	Hereditary	Ari Aster	
2018	If Beale Street Could Talk	Barry Jenkins	
2018	Madeline's Madeline	Josephine Decker	
2018	Minding the Gap	Bing Liu	
2018	The Rider	Chloé Zhao	
2018	Shirkers	Sandi Tan	
2018	Skate Kitchen	Crystal Moselle	
2018	Sorry to Bother You	Boots Riley	
2018	The Tale	Jennifer Fox	
2019	Marriage Story	Noah Baumbach	
2019	American Factory	Steven Bognar and Julia Reichert	
2019	Apollo 11	Todd Douglas Miller	
2019	Booksmart	Olivia Wilde	
2019	Burning Cane	Phillip Youmans	
2019	Diane	Kent Jones	
2019	The Edge of Democracy	Petra Costa	
2019	The Farewell	Lulu Wang	
2019	Hustlers	Lorene Scafaria	
2019	The Last Black Man in San Francisco	Joe Talbot	
2019	Midnight Traveler	Hassan Fazili	
2019	The Mustang	Laure de Clermont-Tonnerre	
2019	One Child Nation	Nanfu Wang and Jialing Zhang	
2019	Uncut Gems	Ben Safdie and Joshua Safdie	
2019	Waves	Trey Edward Shults	

=== 2020s ===
Year	Film	Director(s)	Ref.
2020	Nomadland	Chloé Zhao	
2020	76 Days	Hao Wu, Weixi Chen and Anonymous	
2020	The Assistant	Kitty Green	
2020	Bacurau	Kleber Mendonça Filho and Juliano Dornelles	
2020	Beanpole	Kantemir Balagov	
2020	City Hall	Frederick Wiseman	
2020	Cuties	Maïmouna Doucouré	
2020	First Cow	Kelly Reichardt	
2020	The Forty-Year-Old Version	Radha Blank	
2020	Identifying Features	Fernanda Valadez	
2020	Martin Eden	Pietro Marcello	
2020	Miss Juneteenth	Channing Godfrey Peoples	
2020	Never Rarely Sometimes Always	Eliza Hittman	
2020	Our Time Machine	Yang Sun and S. Leo Chiang	
2020	Relic	Natalie Erika James	
2020	Saint Frances	Alex Thompson	
2020	Swallow	Carlo Mirabella-Davis	
2020	A Thousand Cuts	Ramona Diaz	
2020	Time	Garrett Bradley	
2020	The Vast of Night	Andrew Patterson	
2020	Wolfwalkers	Tomm Moore and Ross Stewart	
2021	No award given		
2022	No award given		
2023	No award given		
2024	No award given		
2025	No award given		
2026	Backrooms	Kane Parsons	
2026	La bola negra	Javier Calvo and Javier Ambrossi	
2026	The Drama	Kristoffer Borgli	
2026	The Invite	Olivia Wilde	
2026	Michael	Antoine Fuqua	
2026	Obsession	Curry Barker	
2026	Project Hail Mary	Phil Lord and Christopher Miller	
2026	You Can See Everything	Nathan Fielder and Lance Oppenheim	
