= Gotham Independent Film Award for Best Documentary =

American film award

- Country: United States
- Presented by: The Gotham Film & Media Institute
- First award: 2004
- Currently held by: My Undesirable Friends: Part I — Last Air in Moscow (2025)
- Website: awards.thegotham.org

The Gotham Independent Film Award for Best Documentary is one of the annual Gotham Independent Film Awards. It was first presented in 2004 with Jonathan Demme's The Agronomist being the first recipient of the award.

== Winners and nominees ==
=== 2000s ===
Year	Film	Director(s)	Ref.
2004	The Agronomist	Jonathan Demme	
2004	Bright Leaves	Ross McElwee	
2004	Fahrenheit 9/11	Michael Moore	
2004	In the Realms of the Unreal	Jessica Yu	
2004	Tarnation	Jonathan Caouette	
2005	Murderball	Henry Alex Rubin and Dana Adam Shapiro	
2005	Ballets Russes	Dayna Goldfine and Dan Geller	
2005	Enron: The Smartest Guys in the Room	Alex Gibney	
2005	Grizzly Man	Werner Herzog	
2005	William Eggleston in the Real World	Michael Almereyda	
2006	Iraq in Fragments	James Longley	
2006	Deliver Us from Evil	Amy J. Berg	
2006	Following Sean	Ralph Arlyck	
2006	An Inconvenient Truth	Davis Guggenheim	
2006	Jonestown: The Life and Death of Peoples Temple	Stanley Nelson	
2007	Sicko	Michael Moore	
2007	The Devil Came on Horseback	Ricki Stern and Anne Sundberg	
2007	Man from Plains	Jonathan Demme	
2007	My Kid Could Paint That	Amir Bar-Lev	
2007	Taxi to the Dark Side	Alex Gibney	
2008	Trouble the Water	Tia Lessin and Carl Deal	
2008	Chris & Don. A Love Story	Guido Santi and Tina Mascara	
2008	Encounters at the End of the World	Werner Herzog	
2008	Man on Wire	James Marsh	
2008	Roman Polanski: Wanted and Desired	Marina Zenovich	
2009	Food, Inc.	Robert Kenner	
2009	Good Hair	Jeff Stilson	
2009	My Neighbor, My Killer	Anne Aghion	
2009	Paradise	Michael Almereyda	
2009	Tyson	James Toback	

=== 2010s ===
Year	Film	Director(s)	Ref.
2010	The Oath	Laura Poitras	
2010	12th & Delaware	Rachel Grady and Heidi Ewing	
2010	Inside Job	Charles Ferguson	
2010	Public Speaking	Martin Scorsese	
2010	Sweetgrass	Lucien Castaing-Taylor	
2011	Better This World	Kelly Duane and Katie Galloway	
2011	Bill Cunningham New York	Richard Press	
2011	Hell and Back Again	Danfung Dennis	
2011	The Interrupters	Steve James	
2011	The Woodmans	Scott Willis	
2012	How to Survive a Plague	David France	
2012	Detropia	Rachel Grady and Heidi Ewing	
2012	Marina Abramovic: The Artist is Present	Matthew Akers and Jeff Dupre	
2012	Room 237	Rodney Ascher	
2012	The Waiting Room	Peter Nicks	
2013	The Act of Killing	Joshua Oppenheimer	
2013	The Crash Reel	Lucy Walker	
2013	First Cousin Once Removed	Alan Berliner	
2013	Let the Fire Burn	Jason Osder	
2013	Our Nixon	Penny Lane	
2014	Citizenfour	Laura Poitras	
2014	Actress	Robert Greene	
2014	Life Itself	Steve James	
2014	Manakamana	Stephanie Spray and Pacho Velez	
2014	Point and Shoot	Marshall Curry	
2015	The Look of Silence	Joshua Oppenheimer	
2015	Approaching the Elephant	Amanda Wilder	
2015	Cartel Land	Matthew Heineman	
2015	Heart of a Dog	Laurie Anderson	
2015	Listen to Me Marlon	Stevan Riley	
2016	O.J.: Made in America	Ezra Edelman	
2016	Cameraperson	Kirsten Johnson	
2016	I Am Not Your Negro	Raoul Peck	
2016	Tower	Keith Maitland	
2016	Weiner	Josh Kriegman and Elyse Steinberg	
2017	Strong Island	Yance Ford	
2017	Ex Libris: The New York Public Library	Frederick Wiseman	
2017	Rat Film	Theo Anthony	
2017	Whose Streets?	Sabaah Folayan and Damon Davis	
2017	The Work	Jairus McLeary and Gethin Aldous	
2018	Hale County This Morning, This Evening	RaMell Ross	
2018	Bisbee '17	Robert Greene	
2018	Minding the Gap	Bing Liu	
2018	Shirkers	Sandi Tan	
2018	Won't You Be My Neighbor?	Morgan Neville	
2019	American Factory	Steven Bognar and Julia Reichert	
2019	Apollo 11	Todd Douglas Miller	
2019	The Edge of Democracy	Petra Costa	
2019	Midnight Traveler	Hassan Fazili	
2019	One Child Nation	Nanfu Wang and Jialing Zhang	

=== 2020s ===
Year	Film	Director(s)	Ref.
2020	A Thousand Cuts	Ramona Diaz	
2020	Time	Garrett Bradley	
2020	76 Days	Hao Wu, Weixi Chen and Anonymous	
2020	City Hall	Frederick Wiseman	
2020	Our Time Machine	Yang Sun and S. Leo Chiang	
2021	Flee	Jonas Poher Rasmussen	
2021	Ascension	Jessica Kingdon	
2021	Faya Dayi	Jessica Beshir	
2021	President	Camilla Nielsson	
2021	Summer of Soul (...Or, When the Revolution Could Not Be Televised)	Ahmir "Questlove" Thompson	
2022	All That Breathes	Shaunak Sen	
2022	All the Beauty and the Bloodshed	Laura Poitras	
2022	I Didn't See You There	Reid Davenport	
2022	The Territory	Alex Pritz	
2022	What We Leave Behind	Iliana Sosa	
2023	Four Daughters	Kaouther Ben Hania	
2023	20 Days in Mariupol	Mstyslav Chernov	
2023	Against the Tide	Sarvnik Kaur	
2023	Apolonia, Apolonia	Lea Glob	
2023	Our Body	Claire Simon	
2024	No Other Land	Basel Adra, Hamdan Ballal, Yuval Abraham, and Rachel Szor	
2024	Dahomey	Mati Diop	
2024	Intercepted	Oksana Karpovych	
2024	Soundtrack to a Coup d'Etat	Johan Grimonprez	
2024	Sugarcane	Julian Brave NoiseCat and Emily Kassie	
2024	Union	Brett Story and Stephen Maing	
2025	My Undesirable Friends: Part I — Last Air in Moscow	Julia Loktev	
2025	2000 Meters to Andriivka	Mstyslav Chernov	
2025	BLKNWS: Terms & Conditions	Kahlil Joseph	
2025	The Perfect Neighbor	Geeta Gandbhir	
2025	Put Your Soul on Your Hand and Walk	Sepideh Farsi	
2026	Closure	Michał Marczak	
2026	A Fox Under a Pink Moon	Soraya Akhlaghi and Mehrdad Oskouei	
2026	NAZA	Yuval Abraham and Rachel Szor	
2026	Once Upon a Time in Harlem	David Greaves	
2026	You Can See Everything	Nathan Fielder and Lance Oppenheim	

== See also ==
- Academy Award for Best Documentary Feature
- BAFTA Award for Best Documentary
- Critics' Choice Documentary Awards
- Cinema Eye Honors
- IDA Documentary Awards
- National Board of Review Award for Best Documentary Film
- Independent Spirit Award for Best Documentary Feature
