= List of accolades received by Get Out =

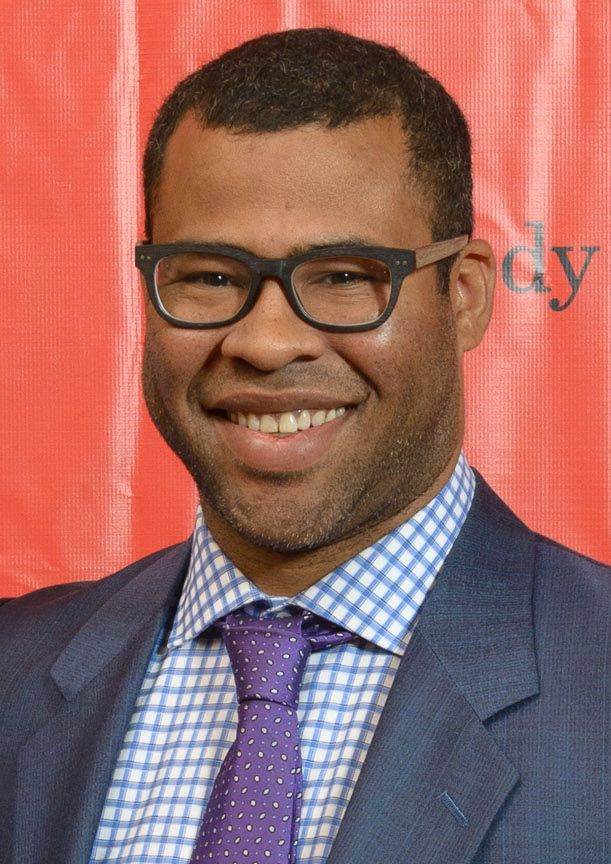
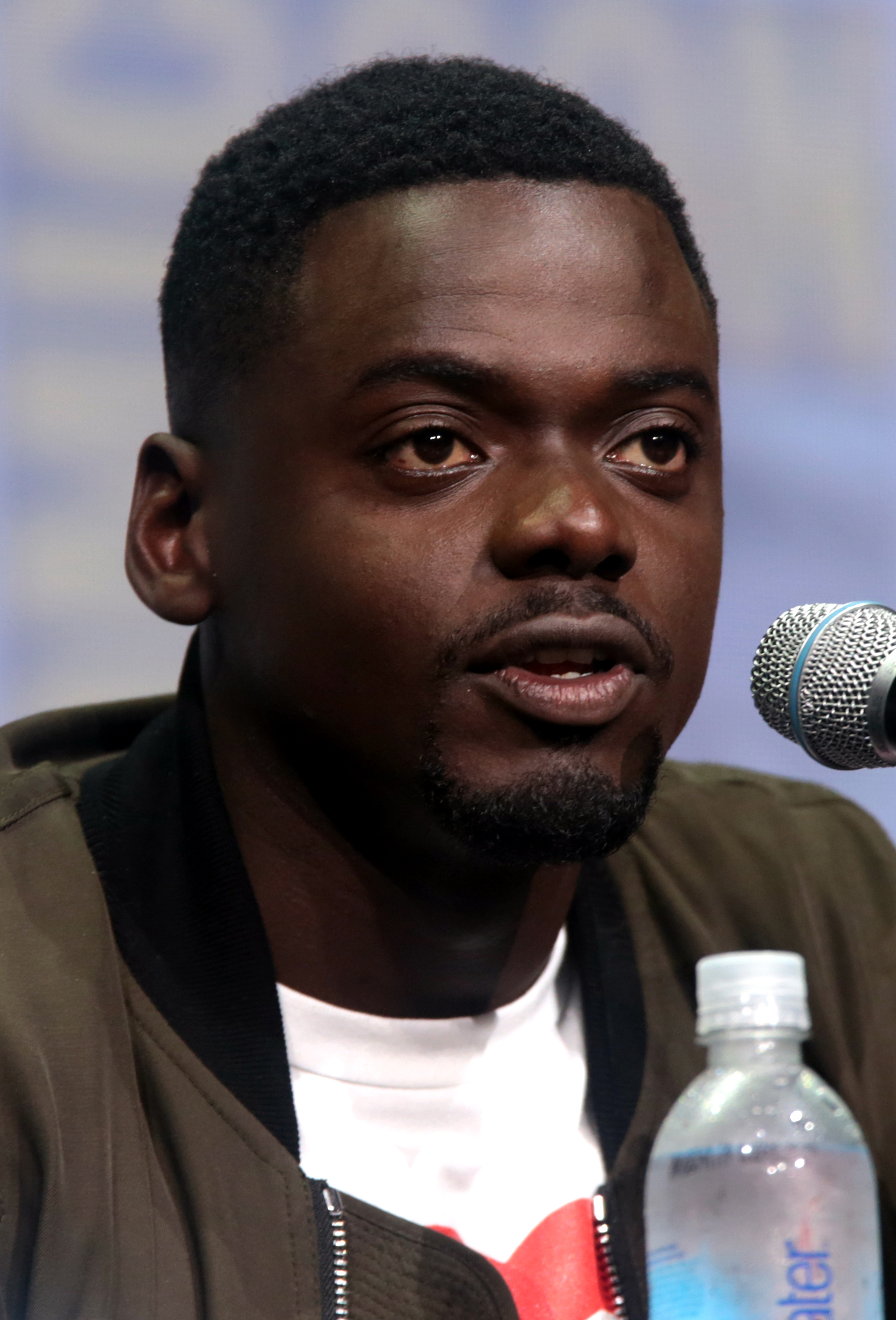
- Jordan Peele (left) received several awards and nominations for his screenplay and direction, and Daniel Kaluuya (right) for his performance in the film.
Accolades
Award	Won	Nominated	Standing
AACTA International Awards	0	2
AARP's Movies for Grownups Awards	1	3
Academy Awards	1	4
African-American Film Critics Association	5	5
Alliance of Women Film Journalists	1	4
American Cinema Editors	0	1
American Film Institute	1	1
Art Directors Guild	0	1
Austin Film Critics Association	3	6	7th Place
Belgian Film Critics Association	0	1
BET Awards	0	1
Black Reel Awards	7	12
Boston Society of Film Critics	2	2
British Academy Film Awards	0	2
British Independent Film Awards	1	1
Casting Society of America	0	1
Chicago Film Critics Association	1	4
Costume Designers Guild	0	1
Critics' Choice Awards	2	5
Dallas-Fort Worth Film Critics Association	0	2	5th Place (2)
Detroit Film Critics Society	1	5
Directors Guild of America Awards	1	2
Dorian Awards	1	4
Dublin Film Critics' Circle	1	5	2nd Place, 3rd Place, 7th Place
Empire Awards	2	5
Evening Standard British Film Awards	0	1
Florida Film Critics Circle	2	6
Georgia Film Critics Association	3	7
Gold Derby Awards	1	6
Gold Derby Decade Awards	0	2
Golden Globe Awards	0	2
Golden Trailer Awards	1	5
Gotham Independent Film Awards	3	5
Hollywood Music in Media Awards	0	1
Hollywood Post Alliance	0	1
Houston Film Critics Society	0	4
IGN Awards	1	6	Runner-up (2)
IndieWire Critics Poll	3	5	5th Place (2)
Independent Spirit Awards	2	5
London Film Critics Circle	1	4
Los Angeles Film Critics Association	1	1
MTV Movie & TV Awards	2	7
NAACP Image Awards	3	5
National Board of Review	3	3
National Society of Film Critics	1	4	2nd Place (3)
New York Film Critics Circle	1	1
New York Film Critics Online	3	3
Online Film Critics Society	2	6	Runner-up (3)
Producers Guild of America	0	1
Publicists Guild Awards	1	1
San Diego Film Critics Society	2	6
San Francisco Film Critics Circle	1	4
Santa Barbara International Film Festival	1	1
Satellite Awards	1	4
Saturn Awards	1	5
Screen Actors Guild Awards	0	2
Seattle Film Critics Society	2	6
St. Louis Film Critics Association	0	4
Toronto Film Critics Association	2	2
Vancouver Film Critics Circle	1	1
Washington D.C. Area Film Critics Association	2	5
Women Film Critics Circle	1	2
World Soundtrack Academy	0	1
Writers Guild of America	1	1
- Total number of awards and nominations
Totals	88	218		
- References

Get Out is a 2017 American horror film directed by Jordan Peele. The screenplay, also written by Peele, is a critique of racism hidden in the United States. The film stars Daniel Kaluuya as a black man who visits the family of his white girlfriend (Allison Williams), who kidnap and brainwash African-Americans into servitude. Bradley Whitford, Caleb Landry Jones, Stephen Root, Lakeith Stanfield, and Catherine Keener co-star.

The film premiered at the Sundance Film Festival on January 24, 2017. Universal Pictures released it theatrically on February 24. The film was a commercial success, grossing $255 million worldwide on a $4.5 million budget. Rotten Tomatoes, a review aggregator, surveyed 304 and judged 99% to be positive.

Get Out garnered awards and nominations in a variety of categories with particular praise for its screenplay, direction, and Kaluuya's performance. At the 20th British Independent Film Awards, it won Best Foreign Independent Film. Kaluuya won Best Actor at the 38th Boston Society of Film Critics Awards. The film was nominated for two Golden Globe Awards.

== Accolades ==
Award	Date of ceremony	Category	Recipients	Result	Ref.
AACTA International Awards	January 6, 2018	Best Screenplay	Jordan Peele	Nominated	
AACTA International Awards	January 6, 2018	Best Actor	Daniel Kaluuya	Nominated	
AARP's Movies for Grownups Awards	February 5, 2018	Best Picture	Get Out	Nominated	
AARP's Movies for Grownups Awards	February 5, 2018	Best Ensemble	The cast of Get Out	Won	
AARP's Movies for Grownups Awards	February 5, 2018	Readers' Choice Poll	Get Out	Nominated	
Academy Awards	March 4, 2018	Best Picture	Jason Blum, Edward H. Hamm Jr., Sean McKittrick, and Jordan Peele	Nominated	
Academy Awards	March 4, 2018	Best Director	Jordan Peele	Nominated	
Academy Awards	March 4, 2018	Best Actor	Daniel Kaluuya	Nominated	
Academy Awards	March 4, 2018	Best Original Screenplay	Jordan Peele	Won	
African-American Film Critics Association	December 12, 2017	Top Ten Films	Get Out	Won	
African-American Film Critics Association	December 12, 2017	Best Picture	Get Out	Won	
African-American Film Critics Association	December 12, 2017	Best Director	Jordan Peele	Won	
African-American Film Critics Association	December 12, 2017	Best Actor	Daniel Kaluuya	Won	
African-American Film Critics Association	December 12, 2017	Best Screenplay	Jordan Peele	Won	
Alliance of Women Film Journalists	January 9, 2018	Best Film	Get Out	Nominated	
Alliance of Women Film Journalists	January 9, 2018	Best Director	Jordan Peele	Nominated	
Alliance of Women Film Journalists	January 9, 2018	Best Original Screenplay	Jordan Peele	Won	
Alliance of Women Film Journalists	January 9, 2018	Best Actor	Daniel Kaluuya	Nominated	
American Cinema Editors	January 26, 2018	Best Edited Feature Film – Comedy or Musical	Gregory Plotkin	Nominated	
American Film Institute	January 5, 2018	Top Ten Films of the Year	Get Out	Won	
Art Directors Guild	January 27, 2018	Excellence in Production Design for a Contemporary Film	Rusty Smith	Nominated	
Austin Film Critics Association	January 8, 2018	Best Film	Get Out	Won	
Austin Film Critics Association	January 8, 2018	Best Director	Jordan Peele	Nominated	
Austin Film Critics Association	January 8, 2018	Best Actor	Daniel Kaluuya	Nominated	
Austin Film Critics Association	January 8, 2018	Best Original Screenplay	Jordan Peele	Won	
Austin Film Critics Association	January 8, 2018	Best First Film	Jordan Peele	Won	
Austin Film Critics Association	January 8, 2018	Top 10 Films	Get Out	7th Place	
Australian Film Critics Association	March 13, 2018	Best International Film (English Language)	Get Out	Nominated	
Belgian Film Critics Association	January 7, 2018	Grand Prix	Get Out	Nominated	
BET Awards	June 25, 2017	Best Movie	Get Out	Nominated	
Black Reel Awards	February 22, 2018	Outstanding Film	Get Out	Won	
Black Reel Awards	February 22, 2018	Outstanding Director	Jordan Peele	Won	
Black Reel Awards	February 22, 2018	Outstanding Screenplay	Jordan Peele	Won	
Black Reel Awards	February 22, 2018	Outstanding Actor	Daniel Kaluuya	Won	
Black Reel Awards	February 22, 2018	Outstanding Supporting Actor	Lil Rel Howery	Nominated	
Black Reel Awards	February 22, 2018	Outstanding Supporting Actress	Betty Gabriel	Nominated	
Black Reel Awards	February 22, 2018	Outstanding Breakthrough Performance, Male	Daniel Kaluuya	Won	
Black Reel Awards	February 22, 2018	Outstanding Breakthrough Performance, Male	Lil Rel Howery	Nominated	
Black Reel Awards	February 22, 2018	Outstanding Breakthrough Performance, Female	Betty Gabriel	Nominated	
Black Reel Awards	February 22, 2018	Outstanding Ensemble	Terri Taylor	Nominated	
Black Reel Awards	February 22, 2018	Outstanding Score	Michael Abels	Won	
Black Reel Awards	February 22, 2018	Outstanding Emerging Director	Jordan Peele	Won	
Boston Society of Film Critics	December 10, 2017	Best Actor	Daniel Kaluuya	Won	
Boston Society of Film Critics	December 10, 2017	Best New Filmmaker	Jordan Peele	Won	
British Academy Film Awards	February 18, 2018	Best Actor in a Leading Role	Daniel Kaluuya	Nominated	
British Academy Film Awards	February 18, 2018	Rising Star	Daniel Kaluuya	Won	
British Academy Film Awards	February 18, 2018	Best Original Screenplay	Jordan Peele	Nominated	
British Independent Film Awards	December 10, 2017	Best International Independent Film	Get Out	Won	
Casting Society of America	January 18, 2018	Studio or Independent – Comedy	Elizabeth Coulon, Sarah Domeier and Terri Taylor	Nominated	
Chicago Film Critics Association	December 12, 2017	Best Director	Jordan Peele	Nominated	
Chicago Film Critics Association	December 12, 2017	Best Original Screenplay	Jordan Peele	Won	
Chicago Film Critics Association	December 12, 2017	Best Editing	Gregory Plotkin	Nominated	
Chicago Film Critics Association	December 12, 2017	Most Promising Filmmaker	Jordan Peele	Nominated	
Costume Designers Guild	February 20, 2018	Excellence in Contemporary Film	Nadine Haders	Nominated	
Critics' Choice Movie Awards	January 11, 2018	Best Picture	Get Out	Nominated	
Critics' Choice Movie Awards	January 11, 2018	Best Director	Jordan Peele	Nominated	
Critics' Choice Movie Awards	January 11, 2018	Best Original Screenplay	Jordan Peele	Won	
Critics' Choice Movie Awards	January 11, 2018	Best Actor	Daniel Kaluuya	Nominated	
Critics' Choice Movie Awards	January 11, 2018	Best Sci-Fi/Horror Movie	Get Out	Won	
Dallas–Fort Worth Film Critics Association	December 13, 2017	Best Film	Get Out	5th Place	
Dallas–Fort Worth Film Critics Association	December 13, 2017	Best Director	Jordan Peele	5th Place	
Detroit Film Critics Society	December 7, 2017	Best Film	Get Out	Nominated	
Detroit Film Critics Society	December 7, 2017	Best Director	Jordan Peele	Nominated	
Detroit Film Critics Society	December 7, 2017	Best Screenplay	Jordan Peele	Nominated	
Detroit Film Critics Society	December 7, 2017	Best Breakthrough	Jordan Peele	Won	
Detroit Film Critics Society	December 7, 2017	Best Breakthrough	Caleb Landry Jones (Note: Also for his work in American Made, The Florida Project, and Three Billboards Outside Ebbing, Missouri.)	Nominated	
Directors Guild of America Awards	February 3, 2018	Outstanding Directing – Feature Film	Jordan Peele	Nominated	
Directors Guild of America Awards	February 3, 2018	Outstanding Directing – First-Time Feature Film	Jordan Peele	Won	
Dorian Awards	February 24, 2018	Film of the Year	Get Out	Nominated	
Dorian Awards	February 24, 2018	Director of the Year	Jordan Peele	Nominated	
Dorian Awards	February 24, 2018	Best Performance of the Year — Actor	Daniel Kaluuya	Nominated	
Dorian Awards	February 24, 2018	Screenplay of the Year	Jordan Peele	Won	
Dublin Film Critics' Circle	December 14, 2017	Best Film	Get Out	2nd Place	
Dublin Film Critics' Circle	December 14, 2017	Best Director	Jordan Peele	3rd Place	
Dublin Film Critics' Circle	December 14, 2017	Best Screenplay	Jordan Peele	Won	
Dublin Film Critics' Circle	December 14, 2017	Best Actor	Daniel Kaluuya	7th Place	
Dublin Film Critics' Circle	December 14, 2017	Breakthrough Artist of the Year	Jordan Peele	Nominated	
Empire Awards	March 18, 2018	Best Film	Get Out	Nominated	
Empire Awards	March 18, 2018	Best Director	Jordan Peele	Nominated	
Empire Awards	March 18, 2018	Best Male Newcomer	Daniel Kaluuya	Nominated	
Empire Awards	March 18, 2018	Best Screenplay	Jordan Peele	Won	
Empire Awards	March 18, 2018	Best Horror	Get Out	Won	
Evening Standard British Film Awards	February 8, 2018	Best Actor	Daniel Kaluuya	Won	
Florida Film Critics Circle	December 23, 2017	Best Film	Get Out	Nominated	
Florida Film Critics Circle	December 23, 2017	Best Director	Jordan Peele	Nominated	
Florida Film Critics Circle	December 23, 2017	Best Actor	Daniel Kaluuya	Nominated	
Florida Film Critics Circle	December 23, 2017	Best Original Screenplay	Jordan Peele	Won	
Florida Film Critics Circle	December 23, 2017	Best Cast	The cast of Get Out	Nominated	
Florida Film Critics Circle	December 23, 2017	Best First Film	Get Out	Won	
Georgia Film Critics Association	January 12, 2018	Best Picture	Get Out	Nominated	
Georgia Film Critics Association	January 12, 2018	Best Director	Jordan Peele	Nominated	
Georgia Film Critics Association	January 12, 2018	Best Actor	Daniel Kaluuya	Won	
Georgia Film Critics Association	January 12, 2018	Best Original Screenplay	Jordan Peele	Won	
Georgia Film Critics Association	January 12, 2018	Best Ensemble	The cast of Get Out	Nominated	
Georgia Film Critics Association	January 12, 2018	Breakthrough Award	Daniel Kaluuya	Nominated	
Georgia Film Critics Association	January 12, 2018	Breakthrough Award	Jordan Peele	Won	
Golden Globe Awards	January 7, 2018	Best Motion Picture – Musical or Comedy	Get Out	Nominated	
Golden Globe Awards	January 7, 2018	Best Actor – Motion Picture Musical or Comedy	Daniel Kaluuya	Nominated	
Golden Trailer Awards	June 6, 2017	Best Horror	Get Out	Nominated	
Golden Trailer Awards	June 6, 2017	Best Horror TV Spot	Get Out	Nominated	
Golden Trailer Awards	June 6, 2017	Best Thriller TV Spot	Get Out	Nominated	
Golden Trailer Awards	June 6, 2017	Best International Poster	Get Out	Won	
Golden Trailer Awards	June 6, 2017	Most Original Poster	Get Out	Nominated	
Gotham Independent Film Awards	November 27, 2017	Best Feature	Get Out	Nominated	
Gotham Independent Film Awards	November 27, 2017	Bingham Ray Breakthrough Director Award	Jordan Peele	Won	
Gotham Independent Film Awards	November 27, 2017	Best Screenplay	Jordan Peele	Won	
Gotham Independent Film Awards	November 27, 2017	Best Actor	Daniel Kaluuya	Nominated	
Gotham Independent Film Awards	November 27, 2017	Audience Award	Get Out	Won	
Hollywood Music in Media Awards	November 16, 2017	Best Original Score – Sci-Fi/Fantasy/Horror Film	Michael Abels	Nominated	
Hollywood Post Alliance	November 16, 2017	Outstanding Editing – Feature Film	Gregory Plotkin	Nominated	
Houston Film Critics Society	January 6, 2018	Best Picture	Get Out	Nominated	
Houston Film Critics Society	January 6, 2018	Best Director	Jordan Peele	Nominated	
Houston Film Critics Society	January 6, 2018	Best Actor	Daniel Kaluuya	Nominated	
Houston Film Critics Society	January 6, 2018	Best Screenplay	Jordan Peele	Nominated	
IGN Awards	December 19, 2017	Movie of the Year	Get Out	Runner-up	
IGN Awards	December 19, 2017	Best Horror Movie	Get Out	Won	
IGN Awards	December 19, 2017	Best Director	Jordan Peele	Runner-up	
IGN Awards	December 19, 2017	Best Lead Performer in a Movie	Daniel Kaluuya	Nominated	
IGN Awards	December 19, 2017	Best Supporting Performer in a Movie	Lil Rel Howery	Nominated	
IGN Awards	December 19, 2017	Best Supporting Performer in a Movie	Allison Williams	Nominated	
IndieWire Critics Poll	December 19, 2017	Best Picture	Get Out	Won	
IndieWire Critics Poll	December 19, 2017	Best Director	Jordan Peele	5th Place	
IndieWire Critics Poll	December 19, 2017	Best Actor	Daniel Kaluuya	5th Place (Note: Tied with Gary Oldman for Darkest Hour.)	
IndieWire Critics Poll	December 19, 2017	Best Screenplay	Jordan Peele	Won	
IndieWire Critics Poll	December 19, 2017	Best Debut Feature	Get Out	Won	
Independent Spirit Awards	March 3, 2018	Best Feature	Get Out	Won	
Independent Spirit Awards	March 3, 2018	Best Director	Jordan Peele	Won	
Independent Spirit Awards	March 3, 2018	Best Male Lead	Daniel Kaluuya	Nominated	
Independent Spirit Awards	March 3, 2018	Best Screenplay	Jordan Peele	Nominated	
Independent Spirit Awards	March 3, 2018	Best Editing	Gregory Plotkin	Nominated	
London Film Critics Circle	January 28, 2018	Film of the Year	Get Out	Nominated	
London Film Critics Circle	January 28, 2018	Actor of the Year	Daniel Kaluuya	Nominated	
London Film Critics Circle	January 28, 2018	Screenwriter of the Year	Jordan Peele	Nominated	
London Film Critics Circle	January 28, 2018	British/Irish Actor of the Year	Daniel Kaluuya	Won	
Los Angeles Film Critics Association	January 13, 2018	Best Screenplay	Jordan Peele	Won	
MTV Movie & TV Awards	May 7, 2017	Movie of the Year	Jordan Peele	Nominated	
MTV Movie & TV Awards	May 7, 2017	Best Actor in a Movie	Daniel Kaluuya	Nominated	
MTV Movie & TV Awards	May 7, 2017	Best Comedic Performance	Lil Rel Howery	Won	
MTV Movie & TV Awards	May 7, 2017	Best Villain	Allison Williams	Nominated	
MTV Movie & TV Awards	May 7, 2017	Next Generation	Daniel Kaluuya	Won	
MTV Movie & TV Awards	May 7, 2017	Best Duo	Daniel Kaluuya and Lil Rel Howery	Nominated	
MTV Movie & TV Awards	May 7, 2017	Best Fight Against the System	Get Out	Nominated	
NAACP Image Awards	January 15, 2018	Outstanding Motion Picture	Get Out	Nominated	
NAACP Image Awards	January 15, 2018	Outstanding Actor in a Motion Picture	Daniel Kaluuya	Won	
NAACP Image Awards	January 15, 2018	Outstanding Supporting Actor in a Motion Picture	Lil Rel Howery	Nominated	
NAACP Image Awards	January 15, 2018	Outstanding Writing in a Motion Picture	Jordan Peele	Won	
NAACP Image Awards	January 15, 2018	Outstanding Directing in a Motion Picture	Jordan Peele	Won	
National Board of Review	January 9, 2018	Top Ten Films	Get Out	Won	
National Board of Review	January 9, 2018	Best Ensemble	The cast of Get Out	Won	
National Board of Review	January 9, 2018	Best Directorial Debut	Jordan Peele	Won	
National Society of Film Critics	January 6, 2018	Best Film	Get Out	2nd Place	
National Society of Film Critics	January 6, 2018	Best Director	Jordan Peele	2nd Place (Note: Tied with Paul Thomas Anderson for Phantom Thread.)	
National Society of Film Critics	January 6, 2018	Best Actor	Daniel Kaluuya	Won	
National Society of Film Critics	January 6, 2018	Best Screenplay	Jordan Peele	2nd Place	
New York Film Critics Circle	January 3, 2018	Best First Film	Get Out	Won	
New York Film Critics Online	December 10, 2017	Top Ten Films	Get Out	Won	
New York Film Critics Online	December 10, 2017	Best Screenplay	Jordan Peele	Won	
New York Film Critics Online	December 10, 2017	Best Debut as Director	Jordan Peele	Won	
Online Film Critics Society	December 28, 2017	Best Picture	Get Out	Won	
Online Film Critics Society	December 28, 2017	Best Director	Jordan Peele	Runner-up (Note: Tied with Guillermo del Toro for The Shape of Water.)	
Online Film Critics Society	December 28, 2017	Best Actor	Daniel Kaluuya	Runner-up	
Online Film Critics Society	December 28, 2017	Best Original Screenplay	Jordan Peele	Won	
Online Film Critics Society	December 28, 2017	Best Ensemble	The cast of Get Out	Nominated	
Online Film Critics Society	December 28, 2017	Best Breakout Star	Daniel Kaluuya	Runner-up	
Producers Guild of America	January 20, 2018	Best Theatrical Motion Picture	Jason Blum, Edward H. Hamm Jr., Sean McKittrick, and Jordan Peele	Nominated	
Publicists Guild Awards	March 2, 2018	Motion Picture	Get Out	Won	
San Diego Film Critics Society	December 11, 2017	Best Film	Get Out	Won	
San Diego Film Critics Society	December 11, 2017	Best Director	Jordan Peele	Nominated	
San Diego Film Critics Society	December 11, 2017	Best Original Screenplay	Jordan Peele	Won	
San Diego Film Critics Society	December 11, 2017	Best Supporting Actress	Catherine Keener	Nominated	
San Diego Film Critics Society	December 11, 2017	Best Comedic Performance	Lil Rel Howery	Nominated	
San Diego Film Critics Society	December 11, 2017	Best Ensemble	The cast of Get Out	Nominated	
San Francisco Film Critics Circle	December 10, 2017	Best Film	Get Out	Nominated	
San Francisco Film Critics Circle	December 10, 2017	Best Director	Jordan Peele	Nominated	
San Francisco Film Critics Circle	December 10, 2017	Best Original Screenplay	Jordan Peele	Won	
San Francisco Film Critics Circle	December 10, 2017	Best Actor	Daniel Kaluuya	Nominated	
Santa Barbara International Film Festival	January 31, 2018	Virtuoso Award	Daniel Kaluuya	Won	
Satellite Awards	February 10, 2018	Best Film	Get Out	Nominated	
Satellite Awards	February 10, 2018	Best Director	Jordan Peele	Won	
Satellite Awards	February 10, 2018	Best Original Screenplay	Jordan Peele	Nominated	
Satellite Awards	February 10, 2018	Best Art Direction and Production Design	Get Out	Nominated	
Saturn Awards	June 27, 2018	Best Horror Film	Get Out	Won	
Saturn Awards	June 27, 2018	Best Director	Jordan Peele	Nominated	
Saturn Awards	June 27, 2018	Best Writing	Jordan Peele	Nominated	
Saturn Awards	June 27, 2018	Best Actor	Daniel Kaluuya	Nominated	
Saturn Awards	June 27, 2018	Best Editing	Gregory Plotkin	Nominated	
Screen Actors Guild Awards	January 21, 2018	Outstanding Performance by a Cast in a Motion Picture	The cast of Get Out	Nominated	
Screen Actors Guild Awards	January 21, 2018	Outstanding Performance by a Male Actor in a Leading Role	Daniel Kaluuya	Nominated	
Seattle Film Critics Society	December 18, 2017	Best Picture of the Year	Get Out	Won	
Seattle Film Critics Society	December 18, 2017	Best Director	Jordan Peele	Nominated	
Seattle Film Critics Society	December 18, 2017	Best Actor in a Leading Role	Daniel Kaluuya	Nominated	
Seattle Film Critics Society	December 18, 2017	Best Screenplay	Jordan Peele	Nominated	
Seattle Film Critics Society	December 18, 2017	Best Editing	Gregory Plotkin	Nominated	
Seattle Film Critics Society	December 18, 2017	Best Ensemble	The cast of Get Out	Won	
St. Louis Film Critics Association	December 17, 2017	Best Film	Get Out	Nominated	
St. Louis Film Critics Association	December 17, 2017	Best Director	Jordan Peele	Nominated	
St. Louis Film Critics Association	December 17, 2017	Best Actor	Daniel Kaluuya	Nominated	
St. Louis Film Critics Association	December 17, 2017	Best Original Screenplay	Jordan Peele	Nominated	
Toronto Film Critics Association	December 10, 2017	Best Screenplay	Jordan Peele	Won	
Toronto Film Critics Association	December 10, 2017	Best First Feature	Get Out	Won	
Vancouver Film Critics Circle	January 6, 2018	Best Screenplay	Jordan Peele	Won	
Washington D.C. Area Film Critics Association	December 8, 2017	Best Film	Get Out	Won	
Washington D.C. Area Film Critics Association	December 8, 2017	Best Director	Jordan Peele	Nominated	
Washington D.C. Area Film Critics Association	December 8, 2017	Best Original Screenplay	Jordan Peele	Won	
Washington D.C. Area Film Critics Association	December 8, 2017	Best Actor	Daniel Kaluuya	Nominated	
Washington D.C. Area Film Critics Association	December 8, 2017	Best Editing	Gregory Plotkin	Nominated	
Women Film Critics Circle	December 17, 2017	Best Actor	Daniel Kaluuya	Nominated	
Women Film Critics Circle	December 17, 2017	The Invisible Woman Award	Betty Gabriel	Won	
World Soundtrack Awards	October 18, 2017	Discovery of the Year	Michael Abels	Nominated	
Writers Guild of America Awards	February 11, 2018	Best Original Screenplay	Jordan Peele	Won	

== See also ==
- 2017 in film
