= Gotham Independent Film Awards 2018 =

Annual US film awards ceremony

28th Annual Gotham Independent Film Awards
- Date: November 26, 2018
- Country: United States
- Presented by: Independent Filmmaker Project

Highlights
- Most wins: Eighth Grade and First Reformed (2)
- Most nominations: First Reformed (4)
- Best Feature: The Rider
- Breakthrough Director: Bo Burnham – Eighth Grade
- Website: https://gotham.ifp.org

The 28th Annual Gotham Independent Film Awards, presented by the Independent Filmmaker Project, were held on November 26, 2018. The nominees were announced on October 18, 2018. Actors Willem Dafoe and Rachel Weisz, director Paul Greengrass and producer Jon Kamen received tribute awards.

== Winners and nominees ==
=== Film ===
Best Feature: The Rider; The Favourite; First Reformed; If Beale Street Could Talk; Madeline's Madeline	Best Documentary Feature: Hale County This Morning, This Evening; Bisbee '17; Minding the Gap; Shirkers; Won't You Be My Neighbor?
Breakthrough Director: Bo Burnham – Eighth Grade; Ari Aster – Hereditary; Jennifer Fox – The Tale; Crystal Moselle – Skate Kitchen; Boots Riley – Sorry to Bother You	Breakthrough Actor: Elsie Fisher – Eighth Grade as Kayla Day; Yalitza Aparicio – Roma as Cleo; Helena Howard – Madeline's Madeline as Madeline; KiKi Layne – If Beale Street Could Talk as Clementine "Tish" Rivers; Thomasin McKenzie – Leave No Trace as Tom
Best Actor: Ethan Hawke – First Reformed as Reverend Ernst Toller; Adam Driver – BlacKkKlansman as Detective Flip Zimmerman; Ben Foster – Leave No Trace as Will; Richard E. Grant – Can You Ever Forgive Me? as Jack Hock; Lakeith Stanfield – Sorry to Bother You as Cassius "Cash" Green	Best Actress: Toni Collette – Hereditary as Annie Graham; Glenn Close – The Wife as Joan Castleman; Kathryn Hahn – Private Life as Rachel Biegler; Regina Hall – Support the Girls as Lisa Conroy; Michelle Pfeiffer – Where Is Kyra? as Kyra Johnson
Best Screenplay: Paul Schrader – First Reformed; Deborah Davis and Tony McNamara – The Favourite; Tamara Jenkins – Private Life; Andrew Bujalski – Support the Girls; Cory Finley – Thoroughbreds	Audience Award: Won't You Be My Neighbor?; Bisbee '17; Eighth Grade; The Favourite; First Reformed; Hale County This Morning, This Evening; Hereditary; If Beale Street Could Talk; Madeline's Madeline; Minding the Gap; The Rider; Shirkers; Skate Kitchen; Sorry to Bother You; The Tale

=== Television ===
Breakthrough Series – Long Form: Killing Eve; Alias Grace; Big Mouth; The End of the F***ing World; Pose; Sharp Objects	Breakthrough Series – Short Form: 195 Lewis; Cleaner Daze; Distance; The F Word; She's the Ticket

== Special awards ==
=== Special Jury Award – Ensemble Performance ===
- The Favourite – Olivia Colman, Emma Stone, and Rachel Weisz

=== Made in NY Award ===
- Sandra Lee

=== Gotham Tributes ===
- Willem Dafoe
- Paul Greengrass
- Jon Kamen
- Rachel Weisz
