= Gotham Independent Film Awards 2014 =

Independent film awards ceremony

24th Annual Gotham Independent Film Awards
- Date: December 1, 2014
- Country: United States
- Presented by: Independent Filmmaker Project
- Hosted by: Uma Thurman

Highlights
- Most wins: Birdman (2)
- Most nominations: Boyhood (5)
- Best Feature: Birdman
- Breakthrough Director: Ana Lily Amirpour – A Girl Walks Home Alone at Night
- Website: https://awards.thegotham.org/

The 24th Annual Gotham Independent Film Awards, presented by the Independent Filmmaker Project, were held on December 1, 2014. The nominees were announced on October 23, 2014. The ceremony was hosted by Uma Thurman.

== Winners and nominees ==
Best Feature: Birdman; Boyhood; The Grand Budapest Hotel; Love Is Strange; Under the Skin	Best Documentary Feature: Citizenfour; Actress; Life Itself; Manakamana; Point and Shoot
Breakthrough Director: Ana Lily Amirpour – A Girl Walks Home Alone at Night; James Ward Byrkit – Coherence; Dan Gilroy – Nightcrawler; Eliza Hittman – It Felt Like Love; Justin Simien – Dear White People	Breakthrough Actor: Tessa Thompson – Dear White People as Samantha "Sam" White; Riz Ahmed – Nightcrawler as Rick; Macon Blair – Blue Ruin as Dwight Evans; Ellar Coltrane – Boyhood as Mason Evans Jr.; Joey King – Wish I Was Here as Grace; Jenny Slate – Obvious Child as Donna Stern
Best Actor: Michael Keaton – Birdman as Riggan Thomson; Bill Hader – The Skeleton Twins as Milo Dean; Ethan Hawke – Boyhood as Mason Evans Sr.; Oscar Isaac – A Most Violent Year as Abel Morales; Miles Teller – Whiplash as Andrew Neiman	Best Actress: Julianne Moore – Still Alice as Dr. Alice Howland; Patricia Arquette – Boyhood as Olivia Evans; Scarlett Johansson – Under the Skin as The Female; Gugu Mbatha-Raw – Beyond the Lights as Noni Jean; Mia Wasikowska – Tracks as Robyn Davidson
Audience Award: Boyhood; Actress; Birdman; Citizenfour; Coherence; Dear White People; A Girl Walks Home Alone at Night; The Grand Budapest Hotel; It Felt Like Love; Life Itself; Love Is Strange; Manakamana; Nightcrawler; Point and Shoot; Under the Skin

== Special awards ==
=== Special Jury Award – Ensemble Performance ===
- Foxcatcher – Steve Carell, Mark Ruffalo, and Channing Tatum

=== Spotlight on Women Filmmakers "Live the Dream" Grant ===
- Chloé Zhao – Songs My Brothers Taught Me
  - Garrett Bradley – Below Dreams
  - Claire Carré – Embers

=== Gotham Tributes ===
- Tilda Swinton
- Bennett Miller
- Ted Sarandos
