= Procession (film) =

2021 American documentary film

- Promotional release poster
- Directed by: Robert Greene
- Produced by: Susan Bedusa; Bennett Elliott; Douglas Tirola
- Cinematography: Robert Kolodny
- Music by: Keegan DeWitt
- Production companies: 4th Row Films; Concordia Studio; Artemis Rising; Impact Partners
- Distributed by: Netflix
- Release dates: September 2, 2021 (Telluride); November 12, 2021 (United States)
- Running time: 116 minutes
- Country: United States
- Language: English

Procession is a 2021 American documentary film, directed and edited by Robert Greene. It follows six men, who suffered abuse by priests, looking for peace.

It had its world premiere at the 2021 Telluride Film Festival on September 2, 2021. A limited release followed on November 12, 2021, prior to streaming on Netflix on November 19, 2021.

== Synopsis ==
Six men who all suffered sexual abuse by Catholic priests when they were young look for peace by collaborating with the film crew to create fictionalized reenactments of their trauma.

== Release ==
The film had its world premiere at the 2021 Telluride Film Festival on September 2, 2021. Shortly after, Netflix acquired distribution rights to the film. It also screened at the Camden International Film Festival on September 17, 2021. and is scheduled to screen at AFI Fest on November 13, 2021. It was released in a limited release on November 12, 2021, prior to streaming on Netflix on November 19, 2021.

The film was nominated for at the Independent Spirit Award for Best Documentary Feature at the Independent Spirit Awards and shortlisted by Academy of Motion Picture Arts and Sciences the for best documentary at the 94th Academy Awards (but ultimately was not nominated). Robert Greene was awarded the prize for Outstanding Direction at the 2022 Cinema Eye Honors.

Robert Kolodny and David Williamson, the film's Director of Photography and Gaffer respectively, were nominated for Emmy Awards at the 43rd News & Documentary Emmy Awards in the category of Outstanding Lighting Direction and Scenic Design.

== Reception ==
On Rotten Tomatoes, Procession holds an approval rating of 97% based on 34 reviews, with an average rating of 8.7/10. The website's critics consensus reads: "Harrowing yet essential viewing, Procession probes the lasting legacy of trauma with heart-wrenching grace." On Metacritic, the film has a weighted average of 90 out of 100, based on 12 critics, indicating "universal acclaim". Procession received a nomination for a 2021 Peabody Award.
