= Bisbee '17 =

2018 American film

- Directed by: Robert Greene
- Produced by: Douglas Tirola; Susan Bedusa; Bennett Elliott
- Cinematography: Jarred Alterman
- Music by: Keegan DeWitt
- Release dates: January 20, 2018 (Sundance Film Festival); September 5, 2018
- Running time: 112 minutes
- Country: United States
- Language: English
- Box office: $117,470

Bisbee '17 (also Bisbee '17: A Story Told in Six Chapters) is a 2018 American film directed by Robert Greene. Partially documentary and partially based on a true story Western, it reflects on the events of the 1917 Bisbee Deportation, 100 years later; it is set in Bisbee, Arizona, both in 1917 and 2017.

== Synopsis ==
Five years after its statehood and a few months after the United States' entry into World War I, xenophobia and anti-unionism is growing in the southernmost towns of Arizona near the Mexican border. In Bisbee, immigrant workers organized and were violently rounded up and transported to the desert in New Mexico; not as famous as the events in nearby Tombstone, the deportation didn't live in the national memory, but is quietly remembered by the townsfolk today. And so at the 100 year anniversary, Bisbee citizens organized a re-enactment. The events unfold again, as if they were happening in 1917, framed alongside interviews with the present day locals.

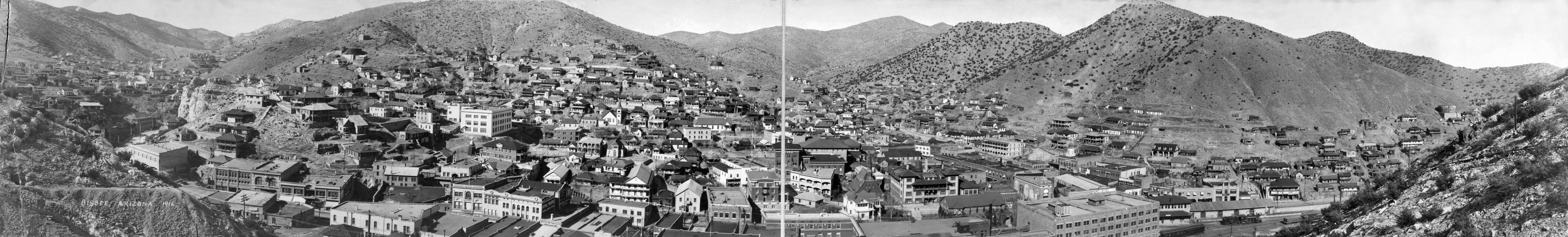
Panoramic view of Bisbee, Arizona, in 1916, shortly before the Bisbee Deportation

== Production ==
Multiple producers are listed for the film, they are, alphabetically: Susan Bedusa, Dan Cogan, Geralyn White Dreyfous, Bennett Elliott, Davis Guggenheim, Laurene Powell Jobs, Jenny Raskin, Jonathan Silberberg, Nicole Stott, Douglas Tirola, Scott Woelfel, and Stacey Woelfel.

The cast are local people, with a lot of focus placed on Fernando Serrano, a young Mexican-American who became the face of the film. His performance has been praised by several critics.

The film was scored by Keegan DeWitt, with Vox saying that the score "sounds ripped from a ghost movie, spiky and glassy and a little dissonant", but that it fits the tone of the film.

== Critical response ==
On Rotten Tomatoes the film has an approval rating of 93% based on reviews from 60 critics . The site's critical consensus reads, "Bisbee '17 offers one town's reckoning with its own history as a compelling argument that the mistakes of the past are truly corrected only when they're faced head on." It is listed as a "must see" with "universal acclaim" on Metacritic, having an 87 average from 22 reviews.

Writing for RogerEbert.com, Matt Zoller Seitz gave the film 3.5 out of 4 stars, praising its exploration of more than just the event itself and for the use of certain images, saying about both that "a series of shots of carved-out quarry rock, the multicolored layers stacked up in the frame become metaphors for the movie you're watching, one of many that Bisbee '17 supplies as it goes along". He also wrote that Errol Morris was clearly a big influence on the film.

Vanity Fair looked closer at the interviews with Bisbee residents, and compared the debate with the nation's present political situation in 2017; it notes that some of the views are "disconcerting" but is glad that the film doesn't make judgement. Alissa Wilkinson of Vox.com also compared the past with the present, calling the film an "unsettling cipher for America".

The film's use of acting within its narrative has been compared to the other Greene films Actress and Kate Plays Christine by multiple reviewers.
