= Gotham Independent Film Awards 2017 =

Annual US film awards ceremony

27th Annual Gotham Independent Film Awards
- Date: November 27, 2017
- Country: United States
- Presented by: Independent Filmmaker Project
- Hosted by: John Cameron Mitchell

Highlights
- Most wins: Get Out (3)
- Most nominations: Get Out (5)
- Best Feature: Call Me by Your Name
- Breakthrough Director: Jordan Peele – Get Out
- Website: https://gotham.ifp.org

The 27th Annual Gotham Independent Film Awards, presented by the Independent Filmmaker Project, were held on November 27, 2017. The nominees were announced on October 19, 2017. Actors Dustin Hoffman and Nicole Kidman, director Sofia Coppola, producer Jason Blum, cinematographer Ed Lachman and politician/environmentalist Al Gore received tribute awards. The ceremony was hosted by John Cameron Mitchell.

== Winners and nominees ==
=== Film ===
Best Feature: Call Me by Your Name; The Florida Project; Get Out; Good Time; I, Tonya	Best Documentary Feature: Strong Island; Ex Libris: The New York Public Library; Rat Film; Whose Streets?; The Work
Breakthrough Director: Jordan Peele – Get Out; Maggie Betts – Novitiate; Greta Gerwig – Lady Bird; Kogonada – Columbus; Joshua Z. Weinstein – Menashe	Breakthrough Actor: Timothée Chalamet – Call Me by Your Name as Elio Perlman; Mary J. Blige – Mudbound as Florence Jackson; Harris Dickinson – Beach Rats as Frankie; Kelvin Harrison Jr. – It Comes at Night as Travis; Brooklynn Prince – The Florida Project as Moonee
Best Actor: James Franco – The Disaster Artist as Tommy Wiseau; Willem Dafoe – The Florida Project as Bobby Hicks; Daniel Kaluuya – Get Out as Chris Washington; Robert Pattinson – Good Time as Constantine "Connie" Nikas; Adam Sandler – The Meyerowitz Stories as Danny Meyerowitz; Harry Dean Stanton as Lucky – Lucky	Best Actress: Saoirse Ronan – Lady Bird as Christine "Lady Bird" McPherson; Melanie Lynskey – I Don't Feel at Home in This World Anymore as Ruth Kimke; Haley Lu Richardson – Columbus as Casey; Margot Robbie – I, Tonya as Tonya Harding; Lois Smith – Marjorie Prime as Marjorie Lancaster
Best Screenplay: Jordan Peele – Get Out; Emily V. Gordon and Kumail Nanjiani – The Big Sick; Mike White – Brad's Status; James Ivory – Call Me by Your Name; Kogonada – Columbus; Greta Gerwig – Lady Bird	Audience Award: Get Out; Call Me by Your Name; Columbus; Ex Libris: The New York Public Library; The Florida Project; Good Time; I, Tonya; Lady Bird; Menashe; Novitiate; Rat Film; Strong Island; Whose Streets?; The Work

=== Television ===
Breakthrough Series – Long Form: Atlanta; Better Things; Dear White People; Fleabag; Search Party	Breakthrough Series – Short Form: The Strange Eyes of Dr. Myes; 555; Inconceivable; Junior; Let Me Die a Nun

== Special awards ==
=== Special Jury Award – Ensemble Performance ===
- Mudbound – Jonathan Banks, Mary J. Blige, Jason Clarke, Garrett Hedlund, Jason Mitchell, Rob Morgan, and Carey Mulligan

=== Made in NY Award ===
- Michael Kenneth Williams

=== Gotham Tributes ===
- Jason Blum
- Sofia Coppola
- Al Gore
- Dustin Hoffman
- Nicole Kidman
- Ed Lachman
