= Diane (2018 film) =

2018 film by Kent Jones

- Theatrical release poster
- Directed by: Kent Jones
- Written by: Kent Jones
- Produced by: Luca Borghese; Ben Howe; Caroline Kaplan; Oren Moverman
- Starring: Mary Kay Place; Jake Lacy; Deirdre O'Connell; Andrea Martin; Estelle Parsons
- Cinematography: Wyatt Garfield
- Edited by: Mike Selemon
- Music by: Jeremiah Bornfield
- Production companies: Sight Unseen Pictures; AgX
- Distributed by: IFC Films
- Release dates: April 22, 2018 (Tribeca); March 29, 2019 (United States)
- Running time: 95 minutes
- Country: United States
- Language: English
- Box office: $339,838

Diane is a 2018 American drama film written and directed by Kent Jones in his narrative directorial debut. It stars Mary Kay Place in the title role, with Jake Lacy, Deirdre O'Connell, Andrea Martin, and Estelle Parsons in supporting roles. It revolves around a selfless woman whose unwavering service to others hides a lifelong secret.

The film had its world premiere at the 17th Tribeca Film Festival on April 22, 2018, where it won three prizes, including the Founders Award for Best U.S. Narrative Feature. It was released in select theaters and on VOD on March 29, 2019, by IFC Films. It received generally positive reviews from critics, who praised Place's performance and Jones' direction and screenplay. At the 35th Independent Spirit Awards, the film earned two nominations: Best First Feature and Best Female Lead (for Place).

== Plot ==
Diane Rhodes is a sixtysomething widow living in Pittsfield, Massachusetts whose days are taken up through service to others. She makes a to-do list for her day, before delivering a casserole to friends, one of whom is recovering from a recent accident. She makes a brief stop to pick up a teacher friend from school before delivering clean clothes to her adult son Brian. Brian, a heroin addict and alcoholic, lives in squalor with his likewise addict girlfriend Carla.

When Diane arrives at Brian's apartment, to which she has a key, she finds him passed out on the couch. She wakes him and they proceed to argue about his sobriety. He claims to be suffering from bronchitis and is angered at Diane's insinuation that he is not sober and needs to go back to the hospital where he detoxed. After she leaves, Diane visits her cousin Donna, who is in the hospital suffering from advanced cervical cancer. Donna is asleep when she arrives and Diane engages in banal conversations with the nursing staff.

The next days pass similarly, with Diane visiting Brian and Donna in succession. Brian continues to object to his mother's visits, while Donna rejects her nurses' offer of morphine and instead engages in playing gin rummy with Diane. After Donna's pain increases, Diane calls her aunt Madge, who a neighbor drives to the hospital. Donna is visibly soothed by her mother's presence.

Diane drives Madge to a family gathering with her aunts and uncles. After a tense exchange with her eldest aunt Ina, her aunt Mary tells a story about an encyclopedia salesman. Diane goes to dinner at a buffet restaurant with her best friend Bobbie. They have a conversation about how many people their age are dying.

Diane volunteers at a soup kitchen, where one of her favorite regulars, Tom, engages her in friendly conversation. Diane shows herself to have close familiarity with the layout of the kitchen and how much food should be out at any one time. When the power goes out, Diane and the other workers bring lit candles to the tables so the people can eat in peace.

During Diane's visits, Brian begins to visibly worsen. On one of her last visits, she finds him passed out in the bathroom and turns the shower on to shock him awake. She angrily tells him that he has to go back to the hospital and he lashes out verbally. Diane slaps him and leaves. At a subsequent dinner with Bobbie, she angrily states how tired she is of everyone talking about Brian, including her. Bobbie distracts her by talking about the history of the buffet restaurant they are eating at and how terrible the food is, which makes Diane laugh. When a server arrives at their table, Diane lies about how much they are enjoying the food.

While visiting Donna, Diane has an uncomfortable conversation with her about an incident in 1999 when their family was visiting Cape Cod when Diane left Brian and her husband at the family home and took off with Donna's boyfriend, Jess. Diane asks Donna if she has forgiven Diane. Donna pointedly says, "I've forgiven you, but I haven't forgotten," and tells Diane how much it hurt for her to take care of Brian while Diane left with Jess. Diane takes her coat and leaves. Diane visits Brian's apartment to find out he has disappeared. She searches for him and calls his phone to no avail. She visits on several subsequent days, but he does not reappear.

On a night where Diane works at the soup kitchen, Tom is reprimanded by another worker for attempting to go through the serving line a third time. Diane intervenes, tells Tom to get as much food as he wants, and upbraids the other worker, yelling at her about how she has no right to humiliate people just because they are poor. Bobbie pulls Diane into a side room and tells her that she must get some peace. As Diane struggles to regain her composure, Bobbie gently tells her to take as much time as she needs "and come out when you're good and ready."

After once again visiting Brian's empty apartment, Diane goes to a bar where she used to be a regular. She drinks margaritas and listens to the jukebox. After she becomes visibly intoxicated, the waitress cuts her off while the bartender makes a phone call. Diane exits the bar, collapses, and begins sobbing. Her aunts and friends arrive to drive her home.

Diane receives a call that Donna is dying and rushes to the hospital. As she enters the room to see her family quietly watching Donna in her last moments, her phone rings. She realizes it is Brian and steps into the hall to answer it. When she verifies that he is fine, she goes back into the hospital room, where Donna has now died. Madge hugs Diane and tells her that Donna loved her, which makes Diane break down.

Diane meets Brian at a small restaurant where he is far more put together and coherent. He tells her that he had to get help himself and that he went to a facility on Cape Cod to do so. Diane initially says that she has something to tell him, but when she is interrupted by the waitress bringing coffee, she changes her mind and tells Brian she will tell him about it later.

An indeterminate amount of time passes. Diane attends a service at a Pentecostal church, visibly uncomfortable in the open worship going on. At the front of the service, Brian, now wearing a wedding ring, assists in a trust fall exercise.

During a conversation with Jennifer, a manicurist, Diane talks about how all her aunts have died except Ina, the eldest. Jennifer discusses how she knows Diane's daughter-in-law Tally and they show mutual disapproval at the depth and fervor of Tally and Brian's faith. When Jennifer asks Diane if she is getting her nails done to attend an aunt's funeral, Diane hesitates before saying she is going to funeral of a good friend who loved getting her nails done. Bobbie's funeral is briefly shown.

Diane visits Brian and Tally to have lunch. As she brings in grocery bags and starts cooking, she hears them openly praying about her. At lunch, they begin to discuss whether Diane will join their church. She is visibly uncomfortable and tries to change the subject. As they persist, she becomes increasingly irritated and finally angry, lashing out at Brian for his selfishness. He turns the accusation back on her, reminding her of how she left him when she took off with Jess. Diane leaves.

Diane begins writing confessional poetry, seemingly inspired by the work of Emily Dickinson, which she keeps by her bedside. She has a vivid dream in which Jess appears and injects her with heroin, though a later journal entry states that Jess appeared much kinder in her dream than he was in real life. While shopping for groceries, Diane sees the former co-worker at the soup kitchen. They pointedly avoid each other. When a call from Brian comes in, Diane declines to answer.

Diane has a conversation with Ina about how she doesn't know how to cope with Brian's religiosity. Ina tells her of a friend who substituted religion for alcohol – one addiction for another. She reassures Diane that Brian will come around.

Diane is briefly seen attending Ina's funeral. When cleaning up the soup kitchen one night, Diane accidentally drops a dirty pan in the kitchen. Tom comes in to help her clean up. Diane apologizes repeatedly, but Tom insists on her sitting down while he cleans. As he does so, he tells Diane how she reminds him of one of his aunts, who apologized for everything, thinking she could never atone for some imagined sin. Diane, barely keeping tears at bay, tells him how she has caused a great deal of pain. He finishes cleaning and tells her that when she serves him food, he feels salvation.

Late one night, Brian arrives at Diane's, intoxicated. He bitterly discusses his unhappiness in his marriage and apologizes for his cruelty to his mother. When she tells him how she cannot forgive herself for leaving him, he tells her that he was never truly angry with her and that he forced himself into feeling anger toward her because he felt he should. They reconcile before Brian leaves, wryly telling Diane he has to go "back to Jesusland." Diane prepares to go to bed, turning off the light for a moment before turning it back on and pulling her to-do list out, adding more entries to it.

In the film's final scene, a visibly older Diane stands outside, filling bird feeders in the snow. As she lifts the bag of birdseed and prepares to go back inside, she pauses, her mind racing with thoughts about what she has to do. She quickly becomes confused and is unable to latch onto a single thought. She collapses into the snow as a woman offscreen calls her name and runs up to her. Diane closes her eyes.

== Cast ==
- Mary Kay Place as Diane
- Jake Lacy as Brian
- Deirdre O'Connell as Donna
- Glynnis O'Connor as Dottie
- Joyce Van Patten as Madge
- Phyllis Somerville as Ina
- Andrea Martin as Bobbie
- Estelle Parsons as Mary
- Danielle Ferland as Birdie Rymanowski
- Ray Iannicelli as Al Rymanowski
- Celia Keenan-Bolger as Tally
- Charles Weldon as Tom
- Marcia Haufrecht as Carol Rymanowski
- Barbara Andres as Dallas
- Kerry Flanagan as Nurse Jackie
- Cara Yeates as Dorie
- Gabriella Rhodeen as Carla
- Paul McIsaac as George
- Teri Gibson as Avis
- Mary Fuller as Diana
- Robert Vincent Smith as David
- Patrick Husted as Bill
- LaChanze as Jennifer
- George Riddle as Les

== Production ==
Kent Jones took decades and multiple drafts to complete the screenplay for Diane, which was inspired by the women in his family. Jones said about his approach to making his first narrative film:

There are a lot of ways to talk about why I made my first narrative feature at the age that I did, but one of those ways is to say that everything that I valued in cinema — everything that I valued in the original movies I loved — it was all about the kind of attention that you can bring to filmmaking. It had nothing to do with preconceived ideas. It was just about the work and a direct response to it.

The film was produced by Luca Borghese, Ben Howe, Caroline Kaplan, and Oren Moverman, while Martin Scorsese, Julia Lebedev, Leonid Lebedev, and Eddie Vaisman served as executive producers. Principal photography took place in Kingston, New York, and lasted 20 days in early 2017.

== Release ==
Diane had its world premiere at the 17th Tribeca Film Festival on April 22, 2018, and was then screened at several film festivals. In August 2018, IFC Films acquired U.S. distribution rights to the film. It was given a limited theatrical release on March 29, 2019, and was simultaneously released on video on demand.

== Reception ==
=== Box office ===
Diane made $27,043 from three theaters in its opening weekend, an average of $9,014 per venue. The film ultimately grossed $339,838 in the United States.

=== Critical response ===
On the review aggregator website Rotten Tomatoes, 93% of 100 critics' reviews are positive, with an average rating of 7.9/10. The website's consensus reads: "A small-scale drama rich with meaning, Diane offers audiences an uncommonly empathetic and wise look at life — and stellar work from Mary Kay Place in the title role." Metacritic, which uses a weighted average, assigned the film a score of 86 out of 100, based on 28 critics, indicating "universal acclaim".

Justin Chang of the Los Angeles Times described the film as "a wise, captivating and continually surprising character study" and commented, "Place commands nearly every frame with a kind of hard-bitten luminosity."

Jeannette Catsoulis of The New York Times stated, "Diane amounts to an act of cinematic bravery, not just in its choice of tough-sell material, but in the patience with which Jones tends it. Parts of his story don't quite work; but by examining a life from the angle of its final destination, the movie offers a rich and tender study of a woman hollowed out by remorse."

Ann Hornaday of The Washington Post gave the film 3 out of 4 stars and remarked, "Thanks to Place's down-to-earth, unaffected performance and the filmmaker's own sensitivity, Diane grows in scope and sensibility, taking on the epic dimensions of time and the unbreakable ties that bind."

Owen Gleiberman of Variety noted, "Diane is the most accomplished dramatic feature I've seen at the Tribeca Film Festival. It's a tender, wrenching, and beautifully made movie." Gleiberman also wrote, "Place's performance has a forlorn gravity, but it's also full of spirit and pluck, and an anger you don't want to get in the way of" and "the film's ending is majestic."

David Ehrlich of IndieWire gave the film a grade of "B+" and opined, "The film acquires the hallucinatory feeling of life itself. It grows even more elliptical and dreamlike, as Jones shifts our focus from the known to the unknown, from the life of the body to the life of the spirit."

David Rooney of The Hollywood Reporter stated, "Although the drama appears to be veering toward devastating tragedy, it makes a graceful turn instead in a more contemplative, interior direction, reflecting on time and memory."

David Edelstein of New York Magazine commented, "Trying to forestall our loneliness is what connects us. That's not a depressing conclusion — it's the beginning of a design for living. In its mundane way, Diane gives you a glimpse of the sublime."

Nell Minow of RogerEbert.com gave the film 3.5 out of 4 stars and wrote, "Kent has assembled a superb group of character actors here, who tell lived-in stories with extraordinary sensitivity and grace. […] Place is a marvel, showing us the longing Diane can barely acknowledge to herself."

=== Accolades ===
Award	Category	Recipient(s)	Result	Ref.
Boston Society of Film Critics Awards	Best Actress	Mary Kay Place	Nominated	
Gotham Independent Film Awards	Audience Award	Kent Jones, Luca Borghese, Ben Howe, Caroline Kaplan, Oren Moverman	Nominated	
Gotham Independent Film Awards	Breakthrough Director Award	Kent Jones	Nominated	
Gotham Independent Film Awards	Best Actress	Mary Kay Place	Nominated	
Independent Spirit Awards	Best Female Lead	Mary Kay Place	Nominated	
Independent Spirit Awards	Best First Feature	Kent Jones, Luca Borghese, Ben Howe, Caroline Kaplan, Oren Overman	Nominated	
IndieWire Critics Poll	Best Lead Actress	Mary Kay Place	Nominated	
Locarno Film Festival	Prize of the Ecumenical Jury – Special Mention	Kent Jones	Won	
Locarno Film Festival	Best Film		Nominated	
Los Angeles Film Critics Awards	Best Actress	Mary Kay Place	Won	
National Society of Film Critics Awards	Best Actress	Mary Kay Place	Won	
Tribeca Film Festival	Best Cinematography	Wyatt Garfield	Won	
Tribeca Film Festival	Best Narrative Feature	Kent Jones	Won	
Tribeca Film Festival	Best Screenplay	Kent Jones	Won	
Women Film Critics Circle Awards	Best Actress	Mary Kay Place	Nominated	
