= Flo Ankah =

French-American actress

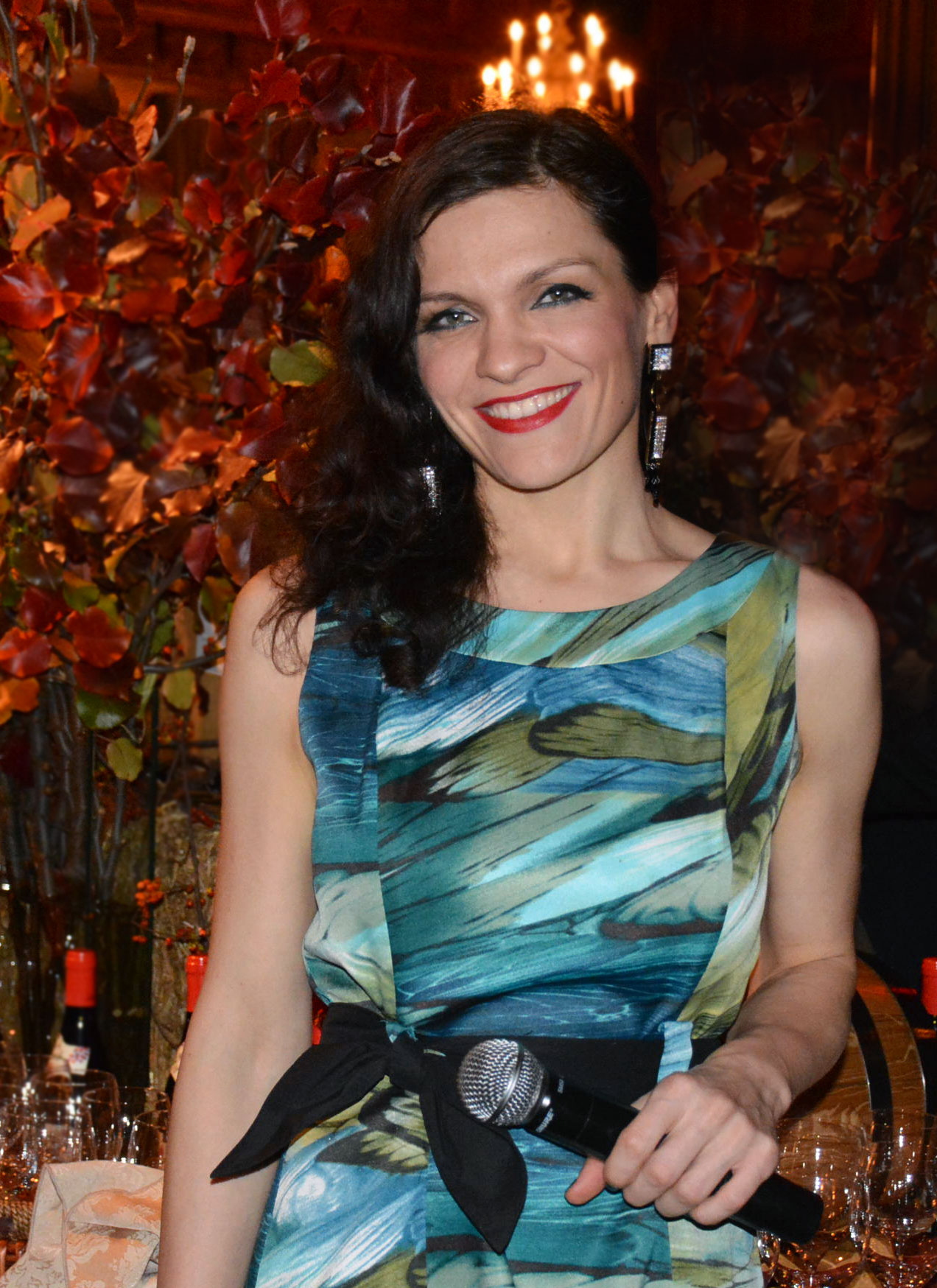
- Ankah in 2014
- Born: Bourgoin-Jallieu, France
- Citizenship: France and United States
- Occupations: Actor; Singer; Director
- Website: floankah.com

Flo Ankah is a French and naturalized American actress, director, and singer residing in New York City. She founded Simple Production in 2006.

== Career ==
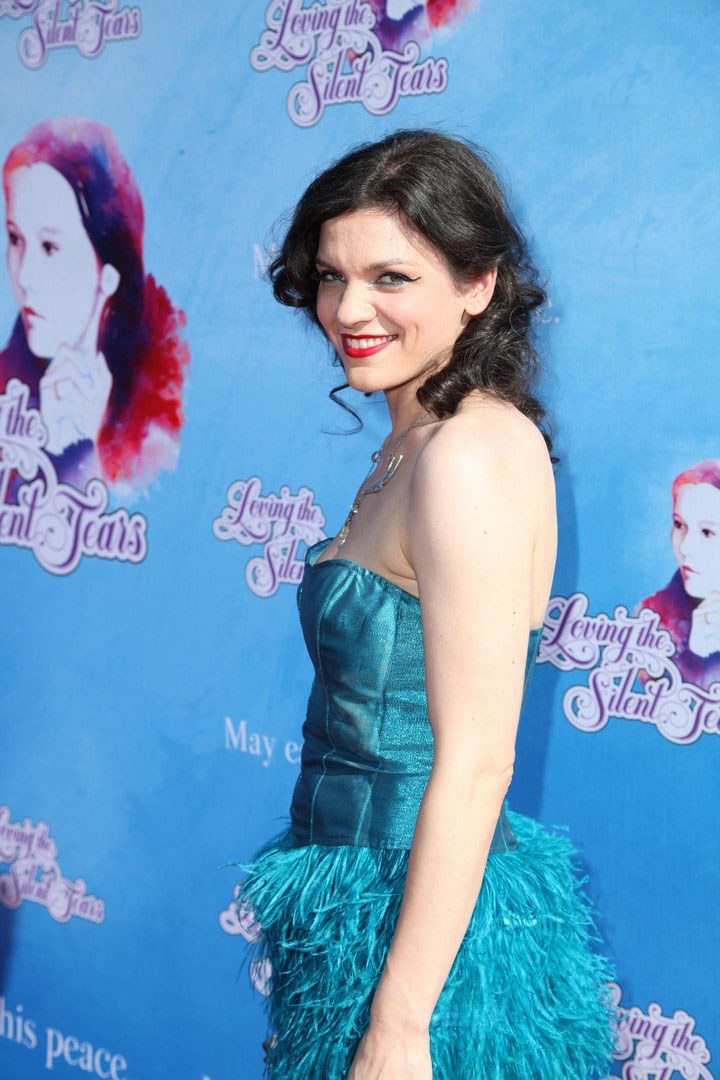
Starring in Loving the Silent Tears, at the Shrine Auditorium, LA - Oct 2012

=== Vocalist ===
Known in the nightclub scene performing with jazz improvisers, she is the bandleader of the Third Set Collective.

Flo stars in the Broadway-style musical Loving the Silent Tears, directed by Vincent Paterson, at the Shrine Auditorium. Her solo show Edith Piaf Alive premiered at Joe's Pub in the Public Theater; other sold out performances include Feinstein's/54 Below and Symphony Space; appearances include the Museum of Modern Art, Bryant Park and the New York Botanical Garden. Her interpretation of "Michelle" was included in The Beatles Complete on Ukulele.

=== Actress ===
Flo Ankah has appeared in film (Listen Up Philip, Then She Found Me) and television (One Life to Live). Featured as a voice artist in feature films (Stillwater, Magic in the Moonlight, My Old Lady, The Limits of Control), numerous television commercials, and is the voice for the French version of Vice News Tonight. Performed for artists such as Mina Nishimura, and Meredith Monk (at the Solomon R. Guggenheim Museum). Alumna of the Atlantic Acting School, and member of the Academy of Television Arts and Science since 2017.

=== Writer-Director ===
One Way and Waterfront Access? are Flo Ankah's award-winning films. She showed her choreography at Movement Research at the Judson Church, HERE Arts Center, and Dixon Place. Flo Ankah is an Alumna of the Kennedy Center Playwriting intensive.

== Works ==
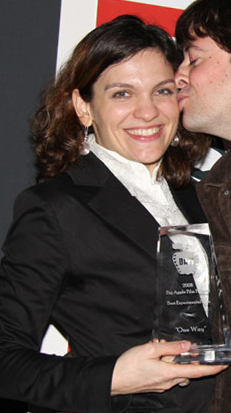
Winning Best experimental film at the Big Apple Film Festival, 2008

Film Acting

- Listen Up Philip - (2014) Brandy, girlfriend to Jonathan Pryce's character.

Playwriting

- Out of the Box - (2018) 10-mins play, Athena Writes Fellowship

Solo Performance

- Edith Piaf Alive - (2012) a play about the Little Sparrow, Joe's Pub.
- Love is French - (2013) a modern twist to vintage tunes, Miami-Dade County Auditorium.
- April in Paris - (2016) a musical tribute to the French spirit, Feinstein's/54 Below.

Art House Film

- ONE WAY - (2008) Best Experimental Film, 5th Big Apple Film Festival
- Waterfront Access? - (2010) Golden Reel Award, Tiburon International Film Festival

Publications

- When Will Women Lead Storytelling in Hollywood? - Film essay published on the Clyde Fitch Report
