= Fake It So Real =

2014 American documentary film

- Directed by: Robert Greene
- Produced by: Douglas Tirola
- Starring: Zane Riley; Chris Solar; Gabriel Croft; J-Prep; Keith Matthews
- Distributed by: Factory 25
- Release date: 2011
- Running time: 91 minutes
- Country: United States
- Language: English

Fake It So Real is a 2011 American present tense documentary film that follows a group of ragtag wrestlers in North Carolina as they prepare for a big show. Functioning both as an essay on performance and a commentary on the working-class South.

== Synopsis ==
Director Robert Greene is cousins with amateur wrestler Chris Solar. This connection sparked the idea to make a film about the wrestling scene in working class North Carolina. The film follows the preparation for a DIY match, tracking wrestlers Gabriel Croft, J-Prep, Keith Matthews, Pitt, Zane Riley, Brandon Powers, David Hayes, Hojo Devlin, Mikado, and AG Smooth.

Robert Greene describes the film as "Fake It So Real follows a group of independent pro wrestlers in North Carolina over one week leading up to a single show. What emerges over this week is the sense of purpose that wrestling gives these guys and the camaraderie and real family that they create around their passion for performing and competing for a small but very vocal fanbase. The film is really about doing something that matters to you at all costs."

== Critical reception ==
The New York Times called the film "agonizingly genuine" while The New Yorker's Richard Brody said "Though the matches themselves, with their crude narrative frameworks and stereotypes, may be something of an anticlimax, the film unearths the tough and complex life experiences they distill."

The film played at both Maryland Film Festival and Visions du Reel, eventually being released by Factory 25. In 2024 Vinegar Syndrome released a special edition Blu-ray of the film.

== Awards ==
Sarasota Film Festival

- Nominated, Best Documentary Feature
