= Gotham Independent Film Award for Best Actress =

Annual US film award

The Gotham Independent Film Award for Best Actress was one of the annual Gotham Independent Film Awards awarded between 2013 and 2020. In 2021, it was replaced by the gender neutral awards for Outstanding Lead Performance and Outstanding Supporting Performance.

== Winners and nominees ==
=== 2010s ===
| Year | Winner and nominees | Film | Role | Ref. |
|---|---|---|---|---|
| 2013 | Brie Larson | Short Term 12 | Grace Howard | |
| 2013 | Cate Blanchett | Blue Jasmine | Jeanette "Jasmine" Francis | |
| 2013 | Scarlett Johansson | Don Jon | Barbara Sugarman | |
| 2013 | Amy Seimetz | Upstream Color | Kris | |
| 2013 | Shailene Woodley | The Spectacular Now | Aimee Finecky | |
| 2014 | Julianne Moore | Still Alice | Dr. Alice Howland | |
| 2014 | Patricia Arquette | Boyhood | Olivia Evans | |
| 2014 | Scarlett Johansson | Under the Skin | The Female | |
| 2014 | Gugu Mbatha-Raw | Beyond the Lights | Noni Jean | |
| 2014 | Mia Wasikowska | Tracks | Robyn Davidson | |
| 2015 | Bel Powley | The Diary of a Teenage Girl | Minnie Goetze | |
| 2015 | Cate Blanchett | Carol | Carol Aird | |
| 2015 | Blythe Danner | I'll See You in My Dreams | Carol Petersen | |
| 2015 | Brie Larson | Room | Joy "Ma" Newsome | |
| 2015 | Lily Tomlin | Grandma | Elle Reid | |
| 2015 | Kristen Wiig | Welcome to Me | Alice Klieg | |
| 2016 | Isabelle Huppert | Elle | Michèle Leblanc | |
| 2016 | Kate Beckinsale | Love & Friendship | Lady Susan Vernon | |
| 2016 | Annette Bening | 20th Century Women | Dorothea Fields | |
| 2016 | Ruth Negga | Loving | Mildred Loving | |
| 2016 | Natalie Portman | Jackie | Jacqueline Kennedy Onassis | |
| 2017 | Saoirse Ronan | Lady Bird | Christine "Lady Bird" McPherson | |
| 2017 | Melanie Lynskey | I Don't Feel at Home in This World Anymore | Ruth Kimke | |
| 2017 | Haley Lu Richardson | Columbus | Casey | |
| 2017 | Margot Robbie | I, Tonya | Tonya Harding | |
| 2017 | Lois Smith | Marjorie Prime | Marjorie Lancaster | |
| 2018 | Toni Collette | Hereditary | Annie Graham | |
| 2018 | Glenn Close | The Wife | Joan Castleman | |
| 2018 | Kathryn Hahn | Private Life | Rachel Biegler | |
| 2018 | Regina Hall | Support the Girls | Lisa Conroy | |
| 2018 | Michelle Pfeiffer | Where Is Kyra? | Kyra Johnson | |
| 2019 | Awkwafina | The Farewell | Billi Wang | |
| 2019 | Elisabeth Moss | Her Smell | Becky Something | |
| 2019 | Mary Kay Place | Diane | Diane | |
| 2019 | Florence Pugh | Midsommar | Dani Ardor | |
| 2019 | Alfre Woodard | Clemency | Warden Bernadine Williams | |

=== 2020s ===
| Year | Winner and nominees | Film | Role | Ref. |
|---|---|---|---|---|
| 2020 | Nicole Beharie | Miss Juneteenth | Turquoise Jones | |
| 2020 | Jessie Buckley | I'm Thinking of Ending Things | Young Woman | |
| 2020 | Carrie Coon | The Nest | Allison O'Hara | |
| 2020 | Frances McDormand | Nomadland | Fern | |
| 2020 | Yuh-jung Youn | Minari | Soon-ja | |

== Multiple nominees ==
2 nominations

- Cate Blanchett
- Scarlett Johansson
- Brie Larson

== See also ==
- Academy Award for Best Actress
- Critics' Choice Movie Award for Best Actress
- Independent Spirit Award for Best Female Lead
- BAFTA Award for Best Actress in a Leading Role
- Golden Globe Award for Best Actress – Motion Picture Drama
- Golden Globe Award for Best Actress – Motion Picture Musical or Comedy
- Screen Actors Guild Award for Outstanding Performance by a Female Actor in a Leading Role
