= Kim Walker (actress) =

American actress (1968–2001)

- Walker in Heathers (1988)
- Born: Kimberly Anne Walker; June 19, 1968; New York City, U.S.
- Died: March 6, 2001 (aged 32); Los Angeles, California, U.S.
- Occupation: Actress
- Years active: 1986–2000

Kimberly Anne Walker (June 19, 1968 – March 6, 2001) was an American actress.

== Early life ==
Kimberly Anne Walker was born on June 19, 1968 in Manhattan, New York, the daughter of Ruth Mary (née Weigel) and Herb Walker. She attended Grace Church School and Fiorello H. LaGuardia High School, where she was a classmate of Christian Slater and Jennifer Aniston, before graduating from The Professional Children's School in 1986. She reportedly remained close friends with Slater and Aniston throughout her life, sharing a Los Angeles apartment with the latter during the early stages of their acting careers.

== Career ==
Walker is best known for her role as Heather Chandler in the dark comedy film Heathers (1988). She also starred as Judith in the drama film A Reason to Believe (1995).

== Death ==
At an unknown date several years before her death, Walker had been diagnosed with a malignant glioma, a type of brain tumor. In January 1999, she underwent a craniotomy in an attempt to treat the tumor. On March 6, 2001, at the age of 32, she died at her home in the Studio City neighborhood of Los Angeles from a brain herniation caused by the tumor. She was buried at Pinelawn Memorial Park in Farmingdale, New York.

In 2002, the Kim Walker Memorial Fund was established at Grace Church School, from where she had graduated. Her family also established the Kim Walker Shining Star Drama Fund at the school. The annual Kim Walker Shining Star Drama Award, created by her mother and brother, honors students of the school with dedication and talent in the performing arts.

== Filmography ==
Year	Title	Role	Notes
1986	Crime Story	Teenager	Episode: "Old Friends, Dead Ends"
1987	Student Exchange	Kit	Television film
1988	Heathers	Heather Chandler	
1989	TV 101	Becky	Episode: "Clicks"
1989	Say Anything...	Sheila	
1989	Highway to Heaven	Ellen Kayhill	Episode: "The Source"
1989	Deadly Weapon	Traci	
1989	The Preppie Murder	Candace	Television movie
1990	The Outsiders	Cherry Valance	13 episodes
1990	Hunter	Allison Janowitz	Episode: "Where Echoes End"
1991	The Julie Show	Kiki	Television movie
1992	Nervous Ticks	Janice	
1992	Picket Fences	Debbie Caton	Episode: Pilot
1992	Down the Shore	Hillary	Episode: Hey Sis, You Up?
1993	Matlock	Becky Smith	Episode: "The Competition"
1993	The Adventures of Brisco County, Jr.	Caitlin Ward	Episode: "Mail Order Brides"
1994	The Favor	Jill Topical	Alternative title: The Indecent Favour
1994	Gambler V: Playing for Keeps	Louisa	Television movie
1995	A Reason to Believe	Judith	
1998	Somewhere in the City	Molly, Texas Acting Student	
2000	Killing Cinderella	Laurel	Final role
