= Gotham Independent Film Awards 2019 =

Entertainment accolade

29th Annual Gotham Independent Film Awards
- Date: December 2, 2019
- Country: United States
- Presented by: Independent Filmmaker Project

Highlights
- Most wins: Marriage Story (4)
- Most nominations: The Farewell, Marriage Story, The Last Black Man in San Francisco, and Uncut Gems (4)
- Best Feature: Marriage Story
- Breakthrough Director: Laure de Clermont-Tonnerre – The Mustang
- Website: https://gotham.ifp.org

The 29th Annual Gotham Independent Film Awards, presented by the Independent Filmmaker Project, were held on December 2, 2019. The nominees were announced on October 24, 2019. Actors Sam Rockwell and Laura Dern, director Ava DuVernay and producer Glen Basner received tribute awards.

== Winners and nominees ==
=== Film ===
Best Feature: Marriage Story; The Farewell; Hustlers; Uncut Gems; Waves	Best Documentary Feature: American Factory; Apollo 11; The Edge of Democracy; Midnight Traveler; One Child Nation
Breakthrough Director: Laure de Clermont-Tonnerre – The Mustang; Kent Jones – Diane; Joe Talbot – The Last Black Man in San Francisco; Olivia Wilde – Booksmart; Phillip Youmans – Burning Cane	Breakthrough Actor: Taylor Russell – Waves as Emily Williams; Julia Fox – Uncut Gems as Julia Holmes; Aisling Franciosi – The Nightingale as Clare Carroll; Chris Galust – Give Me Liberty as Vic; Noah Jupe – Honey Boy as Young Otis Lort; Jonathan Majors – The Last Black Man in San Francisco as Montgomery "Mont" Allen
Best Actor: Adam Driver – Marriage Story as Charlie Barber; Willem Dafoe – The Lighthouse as Thomas Wake; Aldis Hodge – Clemency as Anthony Woods; André Holland – High Flying Bird as Ray Burke; Adam Sandler – Uncut Gems as Howard Ratner	Best Actress: Awkwafina – The Farewell as Billi Wang; Elisabeth Moss – Her Smell as Becky Something; Mary Kay Place – Diane as Diane; Florence Pugh – Midsommar as Dani Ardor; Alfre Woodard – Clemency as Warden Bernadine Williams
Best Screenplay: Noah Baumbach – Marriage Story; Lulu Wang – The Farewell; Tarell Alvin McCraney – High Flying Bird; Jimmie Fails, Joe Talbot, and Rob Richert – The Last Black Man in San Francisco; Ari Aster – Midsommar	Audience Award: Marriage Story; American Factory; Apollo 11; Booksmart; Burning Cane; Diane; The Edge of Democracy; The Farewell; Hustlers; The Last Black Man in San Francisco; Midnight Traveler; The Mustang; One Child Nation; Uncut Gems; Waves

=== Television ===
Breakthrough Series – Long Form: When They See Us; Chernobyl; David Makes Man; My Brilliant Friend; Unbelievable	Breakthrough Series – Short Form: PEN15; Ramy; Russian Doll; Tuca & Bertie; Undone

== Special awards ==
=== Made in NY Award ===
- Jason DaSilva

=== Gotham Tributes ===
- Glen Basner
- Laura Dern
- Ava DuVernay
- Sam Rockwell
