= A Reason to Believe =

1995 American film

- Directed by: Douglas Tirola
- Written by: Douglas Tirola
- Produced by: Ged Dickersin; Douglas Tirola; Christopher Trela
- Starring: Jay Underwood; Allison Smith; Danny Quinn; Georgia Emelin; Kim Walker; Keith Coogan; Christopher Birt; Lisa Lawrence; Obba Babatundé; Holly Marie Combs
- Cinematography: Sarah Cawley
- Edited by: Sabine Hoffmann
- Music by: Lee Holdridge; Yuri Gorbachow; Jeffrey Kimball
- Release date: September 22, 1995 (United States)
- Running time: 109 minutes
- Country: United States
- Language: English

A Reason to Believe is a 1995 American drama independent film directed by Douglas Tirola. The film is set in Oxford, Ohio, and Cincinnati, Ohio, and was released on September 22, 1995.

== Plot ==
Charlotte, a popular girl on campus, goes to a wild party while her boyfriend Wesley is not in town. When she realizes she's become too drunk, she tries to leave the party. But Jim, whom she danced with at the party, soon joins her and forces Charlotte into a sexual encounter. Feeling shame and self-blame, she grapples to find the courage to speak her mind. When she does, many of her friends don't believe her. In the meantime, Jim honestly doesn't think what happened that night was rape. But as members of his own fraternity and campus feminist groups begin to unpiece the puzzle, the ensuing experience challenges the trust and friendship of college students who thought they would be friends forever.

== Cast ==
- Jay Underwood - Jim Curran
- Allison Smith - Charlotte Byrne
- Danny Quinn - Wesley
- Georgia Emelin - Linda Perryman
- Kim Walker - Judith
- Keith Coogan - Potto
- Christopher Birt - Gary
- Lisa Lawrence - Alison
- Holly Marie Combs - Sharon
- Obba Babatundé - Prof. Thurman
- Mark Metcalf - Dean Kirby
- Robin Riker - Constance
- Afton Smith - Becky
- Joe Flanigan - Eric Sayles
- David Overlund - Freddy
- Jim Kieffer - Dave Brown
- Mary Thomas - Tracy
- Michelle Stratton - Amy
- Rachel Parker - Donna
- Sally Kenyon - Daisy
- Andy Holcomb - Harvey
- Cary Spadafora - Nancy
