= Grace Church School =

Location
- 84-96 Fourth Avenue; 46 Cooper Square; New York, NY; US; 40.731892°N 73.990445°W

Information
- Type: Independent, Coeducational, and College Preparatory School
- Established: 1894
- Founder: Grace Church
- Headmaster: Robert M. Pennoyer II
- Faculty: 216
- JK-12: Jr. K–12
- Enrollment: 802
- Colors: Blue and White
- Athletics: Basketball, Climbing
- Affiliations: Guild of Independent Schools of New York; New York State Association of Independent Schools; National Association of Independent Schools; National Association of Episcopal Schools; Grace Church
- Website: Official website
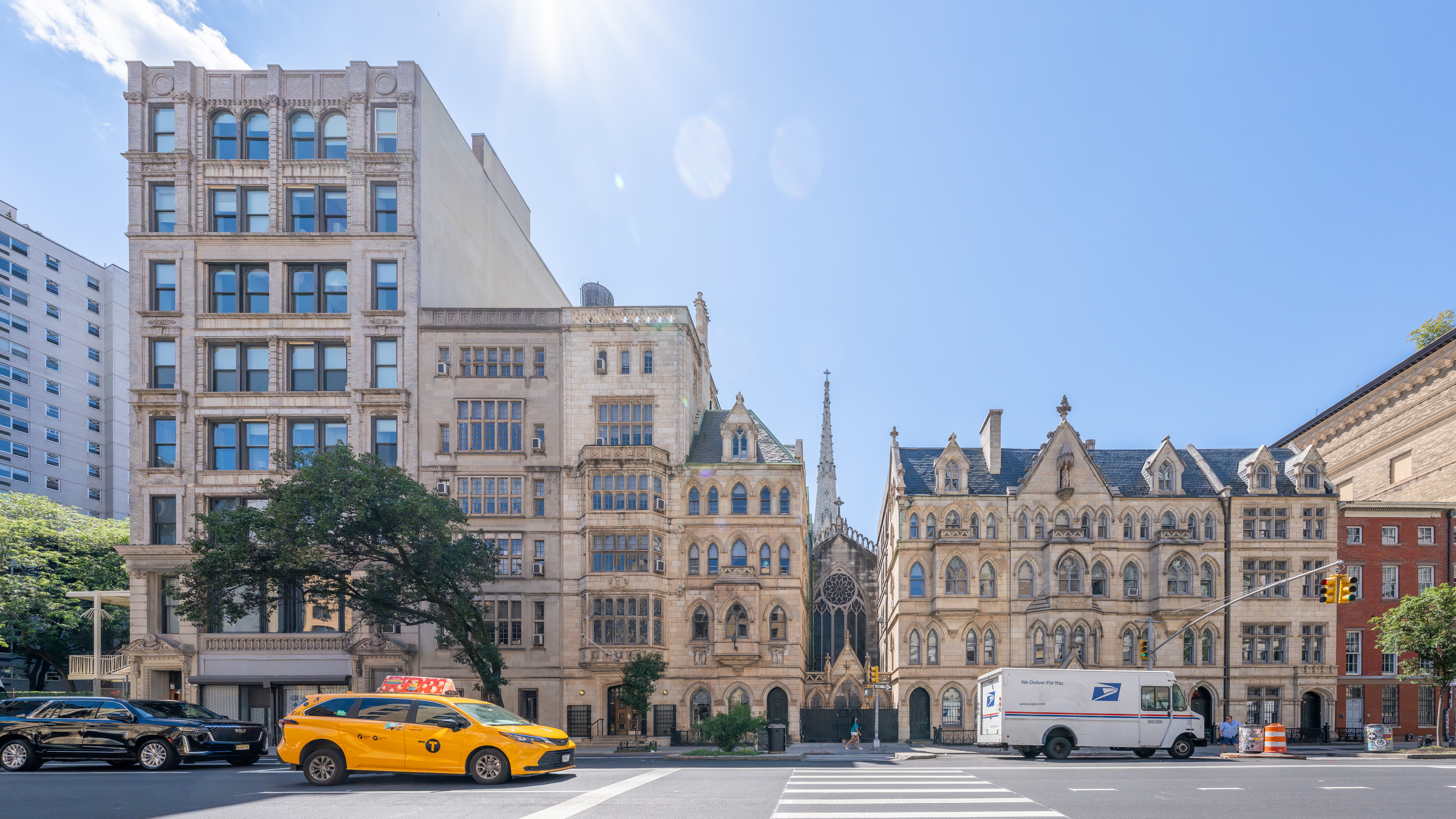
- Historic landmarked church house along 4th Avenue provides space for Junior Kindergarten through Grade 8

Grace Church School is a private school whose original building is located at 86 Fourth Avenue between East 10th and East 12th Streets in the East Village neighborhood of the borough of Manhattan in New York City. The school was founded in 1894 by the Grace Church as the first choir boarding school in New York City. The private day school, which much resembles the school today, began in 1934. Grace Church School's High School Division opened in 2012 and is located at 46 Cooper Square. In the 2015–2016 school year, the school opened for the first time as a Junior Kindergarten through 12th grade program.

In 1947 Grace became a co-educational school and was admitted to the Guild of Independent Schools of New York City. In the following decade the school began to expand its facilities to accommodate a growing student body. From the original 16 choristers, Grace has grown to its current enrollment of more than 725 students drawn from a wide variety of ethnic, economic, and religious backgrounds.

While the school has continued its close relationship with Grace Church, since 1972 it has been governed by an independent Board of Trustees, and it is a fully accredited member of the New York State Association of Independent Schools and the National Association of Independent Schools. Grace Church School is also a member of the National Association of Episcopal Schools. In 2006, the School became a legal entity separate from the Church, and now owns the buildings at 84-96 Fourth Avenue, including the historic and landmarked church houses Clergy House, Memorial House and Neighborhood House.

In 2015, Grace Church School introduced "antiracist" language into its curriculums. Teachers of Grace Church School described "sustained pressure" to accept these changes, and the school later reprimanded a math teacher who criticized the initiative. In a private conversation, the school head conceded that Grace Church School demonized white students. Some students also echoed objections to the initiative.

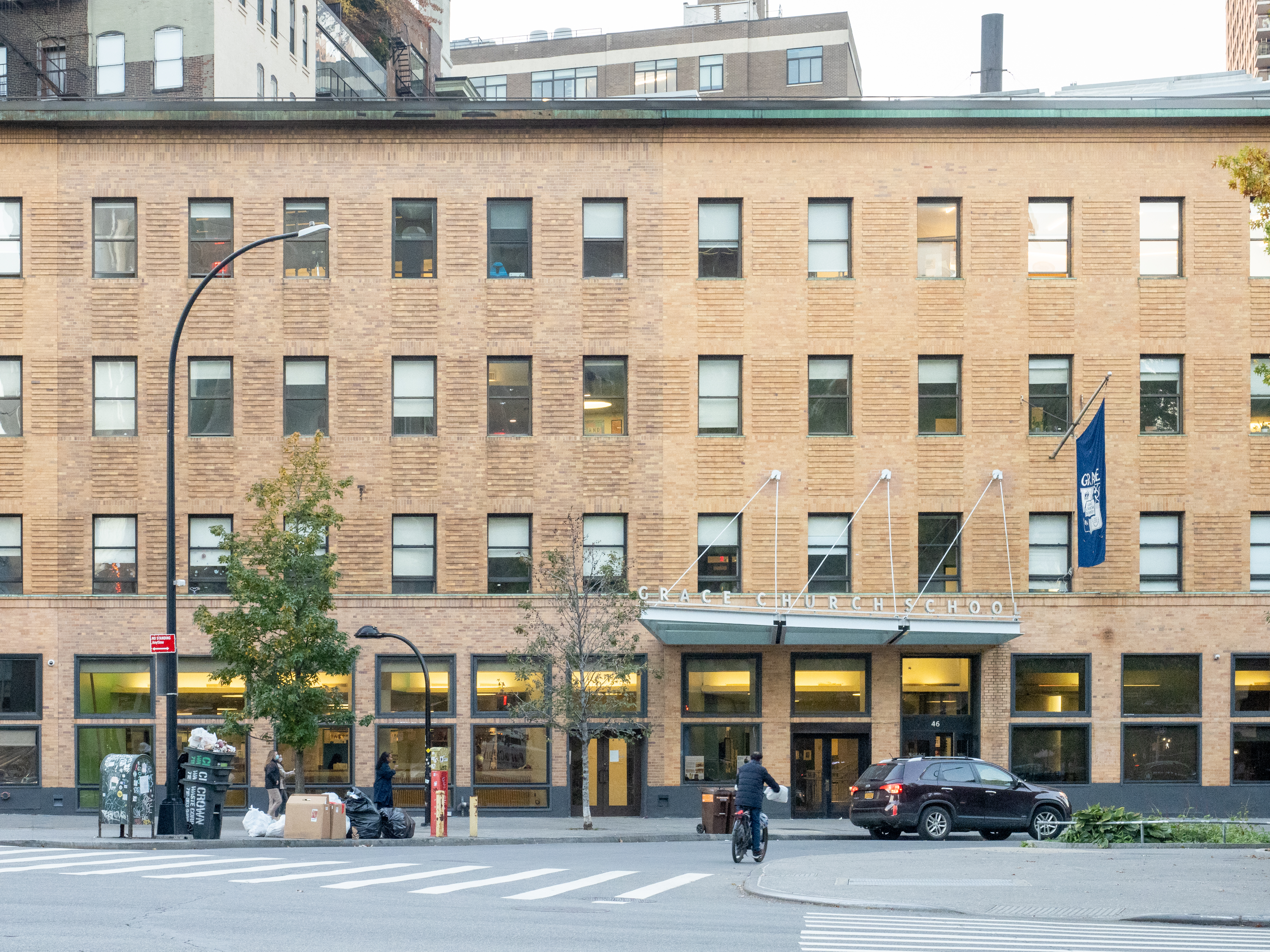
High School at 46 Cooper Square

The Grace Church School's high school building is located in Cooper Square. It was inaugurated in 2011. A rooftop addition by MBB Architects provided a 14,000 square foot gymnasium and athletic center.

== Notable alumni ==
- David Brooks – columnist for the New York Times; contributor to The NewsHour with Jim Lehrer on PBS; and author of Bobos in Paradise and On Paradise Drive
- Peter H. Christensen – academic
- Nicholas Confessore – New York Times reporter
- David Duchovny – actor, "The X-Files" and "Californication" TV series
- Romy Mars
- Kim Walker – actress
- Judith Warner – New York Times columnist and author
- Matthew Yglesias – professional blogger
- Theodor Holm Nelson – futurist and author
