= Brandy Burre =

American actress (born 1974)

- Born: September 27, 1974 (age 51); Sandusky, Ohio, U.S.
- Education: Ohio University (BFA, MFA)
- Children: 2

Brandy Burre (born September 27, 1974) is an American actress, best known for her portrayal of Theresa D'Agostino on the HBO series The Wire.

== Early life and education ==
Burre was born in Sandusky, Ohio. She earned a Bachelor of Fine Arts and Master of Fine Arts in acting at Ohio University.

== Career ==
Burre has performed on the stage in addition to her work in film and television. In 2014, documentary filmmaker Robert Greene collaborated with Burre to produce the critically acclaimed film Actress, a portrayal of her tumultuous return to acting after several years dedicated to building a family.

== Filmography ==
=== Film ===
Year	Title	Role	Notes
2004	Perfect Poison	Maria	
2014	Listen Up Philip	Flo	
2014	Actress	—N/a	Documentary
2016	Slash	Cheryl	
2016	Good Funk	Truism	
2017	Evolution: Siren	Brandy	
2018	Poor Jane	Jane	

=== Television ===
Year	Title	Role	Notes
2004–2006	The Wire	Theresa D'Agostino	15 episodes
2021	Bull	Dr. Soto	Episode: "The Bad Client"
