= Listen Up Philip =

2014 film by Alex Ross Perry

- Theatrical release poster
- Directed by: Alex Ross Perry
- Written by: Alex Ross Perry
- Produced by: James M. Johnston; Toby Halbrooks; David Lowery; Katie Stern; Joshua Blum
- Starring: Jason Schwartzman; Elisabeth Moss; Krysten Ritter; Joséphine de La Baume; Jonathan Pryce
- Cinematography: Sean Price Williams
- Edited by: Robert Greene
- Music by: Keegan DeWitt
- Production companies: Faliro House Productions; Sailor Bear Productions; Washington Square Films
- Distributed by: Tribeca Films
- Release dates: January 20, 2014 (Sundance); October 17, 2014 (United States)
- Running time: 109 minutes
- Countries: United States; Greece
- Language: English
- Box office: $200,126

Listen Up Philip is a 2014 comedy-drama film written and directed by Alex Ross Perry. The film had its world premiere at 2014 Sundance Film Festival on January 20, 2014, and won the Special Jury Prize at the 2014 Locarno International Film Festival.

== Plot ==
Philip is an acclaimed but abrasive young writer waiting for the publication of his second novel. He feels bored of his daily life and his shaky relationship with photographer girlfriend Ashley. In all of this chaos, his idol, veteran novelist Ike Zimmerman, offers him accommodation at his summer home, an isolated place where he might find peace.

== Cast ==
- Jason Schwartzman as Philip Lewis Friedman
- Elisabeth Moss as Ashley Kane
- Krysten Ritter as Melanie Zimmerman
- Joséphine de La Baume as Yvette Dussart
- Jonathan Pryce as Ike Zimmerman
- Jess Weixler as Holly Kane
- Dree Hemingway as Emily
- Kate Lyn Sheil as Nancy
- Daniel London as Seth
- Lee Wilkof as Uncle Jonathan
- Steven Boyer as Parker
- Brandy Burre as Flo
- Flo Ankah as Brandy
- Eric Bogosian as the narrator
- Wai Ching Ho as Helen (uncredited)

== Reception ==
Listen Up Philip received positive reviews from critics. Rotten Tomatoes gives the film 82% based on 137 critics, with an average rating of 7.58/10. The site's critics consensus reads: "As thought provoking as it is uncompromising, Listen Up Philip finds writer-director Alex Ross Perry taking a creative step forward while hearkening back to classic neurotic comedies of (19)70s cinema". On Metacritic, it has an average score of 76% based on reviews from 34 critics, indicating "generally favorable" reviews.

Scott Foundas of Variety, in his review said that "Jason Schwartzman shines as a self-absorbed writer who doesn't quite learn the error of his ways in Alex Ross Perry's sharp and darkly funny third feature." Todd McCarthy in his review for The Hollywood Reporter praised the film by saying that "[An] indisputably talented work for its risk-taking, dark humor and barbed portraiture of creative individuals." Richard Brody of The New Yorker, praised the film by saying that "I can't think of a recent movie that stages with as much joy and wonder the sense of living a life that becomes, directly or obliquely, in action or in idea, the stuff of art." Sam Fragoso in his review for RogerEbert.com said that "Alex Ross Perry's third feature film is his most narratively satisfying and intellectually demanding one, demonstrating a maturation in both style and substance." Rodrigo Perez of Indiewire, graded the film A− and said that "A deeply misanthropic portrait of narcissism, the brittle nature of artistic talent and the struggles of living in New York City, this toxic comedy pulls very few punches when it needs to get really nasty."

The A.V. Club's Ignatiy Vishnevetsky called it "a howlingly funny black comedy with really sharp teeth", going on to say: "Writing pithy wisecracks is easy. What Perry does is write banter that reveals his character's insecurities and weaknesses; [...] There's a level of criticism at play in the film, which immediately sets it apart from similarly set New York art-world horror stories, but it doesn't cancel out the writer-director's clear empathy for his characters, who never quite manage to empathize with each other. This sort of mature perspective is a rare thing, and Listen Up Philip establishes Perry as a major talent."
