= Midnight Traveler =

- Theatrical release poster
- Directed by: Hassan Fazili
- Written by: Emelie Mahdavian
- Produced by: Emelie Mahdavian; Su Kim
- Starring: Nargis Fazili; Zahra Fazili; Fatima Hussaini; Hassan Fazili
- Cinematography: Fatima Hussaini; Hassan Fazili; Nargis Fazili; Zahra Fazili
- Edited by: Emelie Mahdavian
- Music by: Gretchen Jude
- Production company: Old Chilly Pictures
- Distributed by: Oscilloscope (US)
- Release dates: January 27, 2019 (Sundance); September 18, 2019 (US)
- Running time: 87 minutes
- Countries: United States; Qatar; Canada; United Kingdom
- Language: Dari

Midnight Traveler is a 2019 documentary film directed by Hassan Fazili. Filmed on three smartphones by Fazili and his wife, Fatima Hussaini, and their two daughters, it chronicles their three-year journey from their home in Afghanistan to Europe in search for asylum.

The film premiered in the World Cinema Documentary Competition at the Sundance Film Festival in January 2019, where it won the Special Jury Award for No Borders. It also screened in the Panorama section at the Berlin International Film Festival in February 2019, where it won the second prize in the documentary section. It was nominated for Best Documentary at the 2019 Gotham Independent Film Awards. PBS aired the film as part of the POV series on December 30, 2019. As an episode of the series, the film received a Peabody Award in 2020.

== Background ==
Fazili and Hussaini, who are self-taught filmmakers, owned Kabul's Art Café and Restaurant, a place where men and women with reformist beliefs would congregate, until conservative religious leaders organized a boycott and a police raid, forcing the couple to shut it down. In 2015, after Fazili's documentary about Mullah Tur Jan, a former Taliban commander who renounced the cause, aired on national television, Taliban murdered Mullah Tur Jan and put a bounty on Fazili's head. The Fazilis fled to Tajikistan and applied for asylum, but after 14 months, they were deported back to Afghanistan. This is the context in which the film begins.

== Content ==
The family leaves for Europe, on the so-called "Balkan route". They reach Turkey through Iran by car, and then Bulgaria with the help of smugglers. They find a place to stay at a refugee camp but fall victim to hate crime and travel illegally to Serbia. On the way to Serbia, they are forced to camp out for days. They arrive at a refugee camp in Krnjača, Serbia, where they spend many months waiting to be able to request asylum to Hungary. After 475 days in Serbia, the family travels to Hungary. They are detained in the Röszke Transit Zone in Hungary for nearly three months while their asylum case is processed. Finally, they are granted refugee status into the European Union, three years after fleeing Afghanistan.

== Aftermath ==
Without permission from authorities, the Fazilis moved to Germany the same month they were granted refugee status, because of the poor treatment they received in the detention center in Hungary. German authorities declined the Fazilis' request to stay, forcing them to live in poor condition in Hungary until November 2019. They were then granted permanent residency in Germany.

== Production ==
Persian-speaking filmmaker Emelie Mahdavian, who produced and edited the film, set up "contact points" in each country to copy footage Fazili stored in SD cards and send it to her in the United States so that, once the footage was received, the family could delete old footage and secure storage space on their phones to shoot new footage. Mahdavian joined Fazili in Serbia to work on story development and record voice-over. 300 hours of footage and 25 hours of voice-over were edited down to the 87-minute film. While the Fazilis were waiting for their asylum request to be processed, the production team joined them in Germany to work on post-production.

== Release ==
In March 2019, Oscilloscope acquired the North American rights to the film. It released the film theatrically on September 18, 2019.

== Reception ==
On review aggregator website Rotten Tomatoes, the film holds an approval rating of 100%, based on 47 reviews, and an average rating of 8.1/10. The site's critical consensus reads, "Midnight Traveler puts a harrowing personal face on the modern refugee crisis, driving home the heartbreakingly relatable odysseys of the displaced." On Metacritic, the film has a weighted average score of 79 out of 100, based on 18 critics, indicating "generally favorable reviews".

Wendy Ide of Screen International called the film an "affecting, essential documentary" and wrote, "the suffering, fear and humiliation that they experience is balanced by moments of warmth and an artist's magpie eye for unexpected glimpses of beauty. It's a remarkable achievement." Simran Hans of The Observer wrote, "the combination of perspectives paints a vivid and hopeful portrait of a family, as well as an indictment of the refugee crisis".

Gary Garrison of The Playlist gave the film an A− grade, writing, "It does not set out to tell The Refugee story, nor does it shoehorn statistics in about violence in Afghanistan or families forced from their homes ... Midnight Traveler, rather, is a film about a family, about the hardship and inhumanity they have endured, about their bravery, about their love, about their hope, and, above all else, about their desire to be safe and in control of their lives and bodies and destinies and fates."

Manohla Dargis of The New York Times wrote, "What largely distinguishes Midnight Traveler is its anxious intimacy, a sense of uneasy closeness that pulls you into a family circle that at times gets very small ... The filmmakers are chronicling their own lives, of course. But they are also documenting a far larger catastrophe, one that comes in different languages and affects innumerable families."

Vanessa H. Larson of The Washington Post described the film as "the extraordinary first-person account of filmmaker Hassan Fazili's escape from Afghanistan with his family" and wrote, "The film captures not only the harrowing moments of their ordeal but also the sheer tedium of the seemingly endless waiting and uncertainty that come with being refugees."

Doreen St. Félix of The New Yorker wrote, "There is a defiance to the Fazilis' methods of documenting their hell on earth. The film has flair, a sense of style and drama, and of playfulness." St. Félix called for better recognition of the film's "narrative and aesthetic strengths", which she argued "are not superficial flourishes but indeed inseparable from how we observe the family unit".

== See also ==
List of films shot on mobile phones
