= Kate Plays Christine =

- Theatrical release poster
- Directed by: Robert Greene
- Written by: Robert Greene
- Produced by: Susan Bedusa
- Starring: Kate Lyn Sheil
- Cinematography: Sean Price Williams
- Edited by: Robert Greene
- Music by: Keegan DeWitt
- Production companies: Faliro House; 4th Row Films; Prewar Cinema
- Distributed by: Grasshopper Film
- Release dates: January 24, 2016 (SFF); August 24, 2016
- Running time: 112 minutes
- Country: United States
- Language: English
- Box office: $27,364

Kate Plays Christine is a 2016 American documentary film written and directed by Robert Greene. It follows actress Kate Lyn Sheil's preparation for the role of Christine Chubbuck, a newscaster who committed suicide on live television in 1974, for a fictitious film. It is one of the two films about Chubbuck that premiered at the 2016 Sundance Film Festival, the other being Christine.

== Release ==
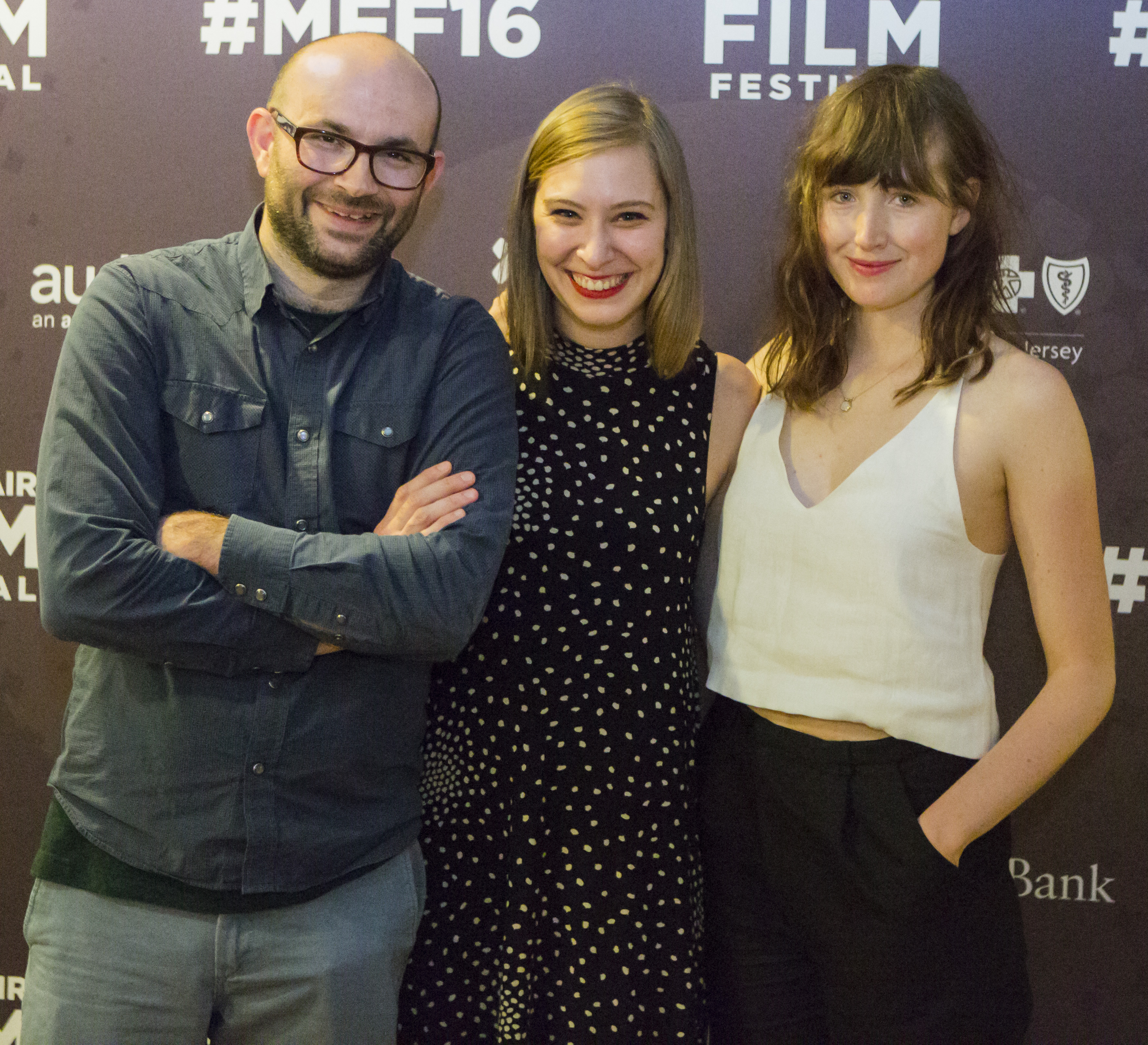
Director Robert Greene, producer Bennett Elliott, lead actress Kate Lyn Sheil at the Montclair Film Festival in 2016

The film premiered on January 24, 2016, at the 2016 Sundance Film Festival in the U.S. Documentary Competition section, where it won the Special Jury Award for Writing. It was also selected to screen at the 66th Berlin International Film Festival in February 2016. Grasshopper Film acquired the US distribution rights to the film in April 2016. The film received a very limited release on August 26, 2016; shown on a total 10 screens, between the US and UK, over the next four months, it grossed $27,364 at the box office.

== Critical response ==
On the review aggregator website Rotten Tomatoes, 83% of 70 critics' reviews are positive, with an average rating of 7.2/10. The website's consensus reads: "Kate Plays Christine blurs genres—and the line between fact and reality—with a cleverly provocative docudrama look at newscaster Christine Chubbuck's life and death." Metacritic, which uses a weighted average, assigned the film a score of 75 out of 100, based on 19 critics, indicating "generally favorable" reviews.
