= Robert Greene (filmmaker) =

American filmmaker (born 1976)

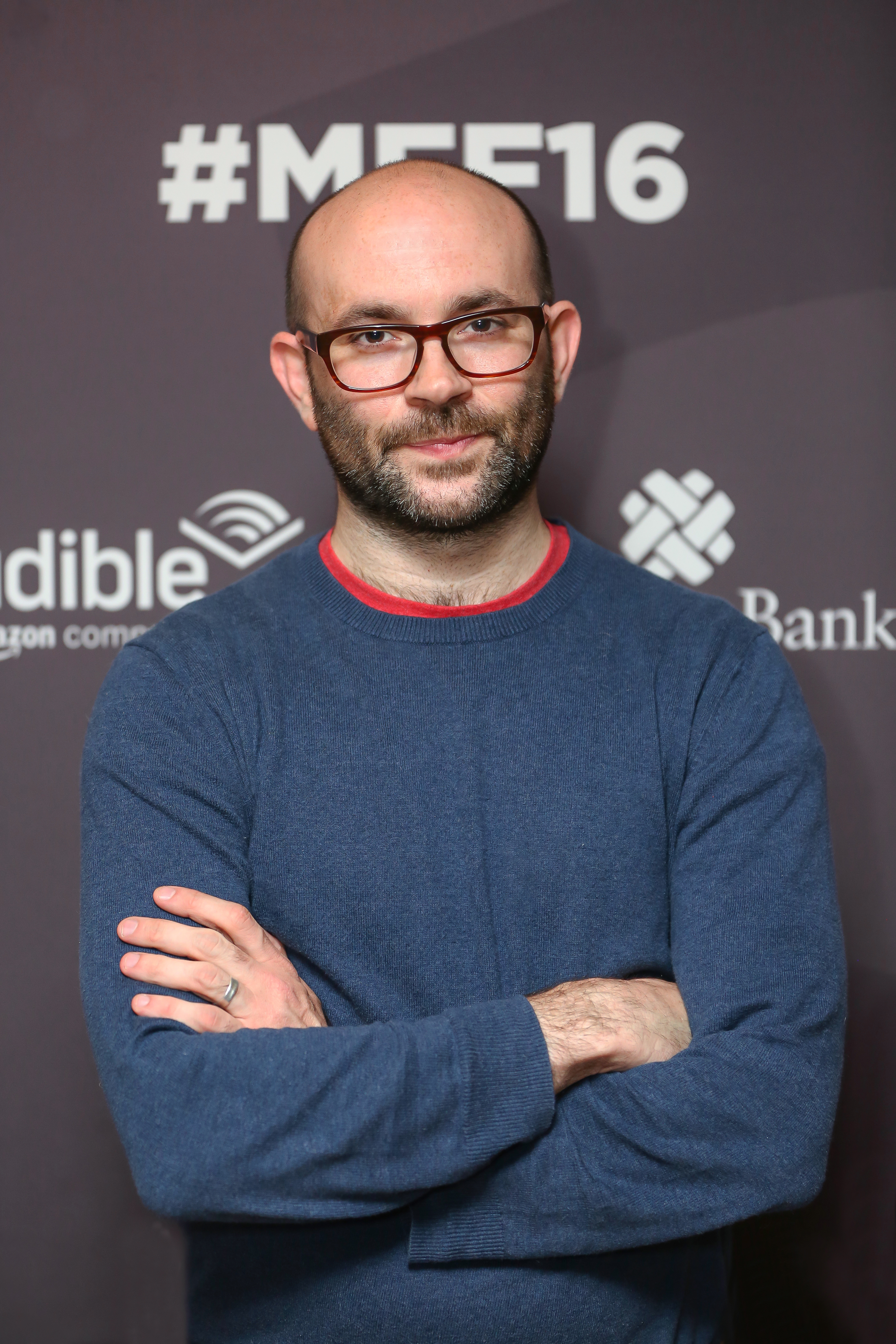
- Greene in 2016
- Born: May 25, 1976 (age 50); Charlotte, North Carolina
- Occupations: Film director, Editor, Producer, Professor
- Years active: 2002–present

Robert Greene (born May 25, 1976) is an American documentary filmmaker, editor, and writer. His documentaries include Procession, Bisbee '17, Kate Plays Christine, Actress, and Fake It So Real. He was named one of the 10 Filmmakers to Watch in 2014 by The Independent, and is "filmmaker-in-chief" at the Murray Center for Documentary Journalism at the University of Missouri, beginning in 2015.

== Life and career ==
Robert Greene was born in Charlotte, North Carolina. He was a graduate of Sun Valley High School (North Carolina). He received his bachelor's degree from North Carolina State University in 2000, majoring in Communication and Multidisciplinary Film Studies. He received his M.F.A. in Media Arts Studies at City College of New York. During his studies in New York, he worked at Kim's Video. In 2002, Greene began working at 4th Row Films, starting as freelance editor. In 2004 he began working a full-time as a post-production supervisor. During this time, he worked with producers Douglas Tirola and Susan Bedusa on films including All In: The Poker Movie (2008), Making the Boys (2011), and An Omar Broadway Film (2008). While he was at 4th Row, Greene directed and produced Owning the Weather (2009) about humanity's attempts to control climate, and Kati with an I (2010).

In 2011 he released Fake It So Real, his third feature as director, a documentary following a Lincolnton, North Carolina independent wrestling group over the week leading up to a big show. In 2012 he left 4th Row Films to work on independent projects. In 2014 he directed Actress, a documentary about actress Brandy Burre as she attempts to return to her acting career after abandoning it to concentrate on raising a family. In 2016 he directed Kate Plays Christine, a more experimental work depicting actress Kate Lyn Sheil's preparations to portray the role of Christine Chubbuck, a real-life news reporter who took her own life on national television in 1974.

In 2021, Robert Greene premiered Procession at the Telluride Film Festival where it was acquired by Netflix. Procession follows six men who suffered sexual abuse by Catholic priests band together to become a makeshift family, and find empowerment by creating fictional scenes depicting rituals of power in the church. The film was nominated for at the Independent Spirit Award for Best Documentary Feature at the Independent Spirit Awards and shortlisted by Academy of Motion Picture Arts and Sciences the for best documentary at the 94th Academy Awards.

In 2026 it was announced that Greene's next film Too Much Sugar would premiere at the 83rd Venice International Film Festival in the Orizzonti section. The Missouri based film follows Ryan “Holli-wood” Hollinger, a formerly incarcerated amateur MMA fighter and father of six as he tries to keep his family together. The film finds Robert Greene continuing down the path of utilizing therapy and collaboration as a cinematic tool.

Robert Greene has worked with Sean Price Williams and Alex Ross Perry, having edited Perry's feature film Listen Up Philip, as well as Amanda Rose Wilder's Approaching the Elephant, Nick Berardini's Tom Swift and His Electric Rifle, and Robert Kolodny's The Featherweight. In 2015 Greene was appointed filmmaker-in-chief at the new Jonathan B. Murray Center for Documentary Journalism at the University of Missouri in Columbia, MO. He is also an assistant professor in their Journalism and Film Studies programs.

He is a writer, critic and reviewer, contributing regularly to Sight & Sound as well as to other print and online publications including Filmmaker, Criterion, and Criticwire. Present Tense: Notes on American Nonfiction Cinema 1998-2013, his first book, was released by The Critical Press in July 2015.

== Influences ==
Robert Greene cites a variety of filmmakers and directors as influences for his work, including Frederick Wiseman, Albert and David Maysles, Rainer Werner Fassbinder, Jean-Luc Godard, John Cassavetes, and Kon Ichikawa. Robert Greene has called Peter Watkins' Edvard Munch his favorite film of all time.

For Actress, Robert Greene was interested in Wiseman and Douglas Sirk for their mastery of visuals and definitive style, on how their influence could be incorporated in telling Burre's story.

== Filmography ==
=== As director ===
- Too Much Sugar (2026)
- Procession (2021)
- Bisbee '17 (2018)
- Kate Plays Christine (2016)
- Actress (2014)
- Fake It So Real (2011)
- Goodbye Engineer (2011)
- Kati With an I (2010)
- Owning the Weather (2009)

=== As editor ===
- Pavements (2024) (also producer)
- The Featherweight (2023)
- Her Smell (2018)
- Golden Exits (2017)
- Tom Swift and His Electric Rifle (2015)
- 7 Chinese Brothers (2015)
- Queen of Earth (2015)
- Listen Up Philip (2014)
- Christmas, Again (2014)
- Approaching the Elephant (2014) (also producer)
- If You Take This (2014) (also producer)
- The Vanquishing of the Witch Baba Yaga (2014) (additional editing)
- Hellaware (2013) (additional editing)
- Hey Bartender (2013)
- Lenny Cooke (2013)
- All In: The Poker Movie (2012)
- Making the Boys (2011)
- An Omar Broadway Film (2008)
