= Douglas Tirola =

American film director

Doug Tirola
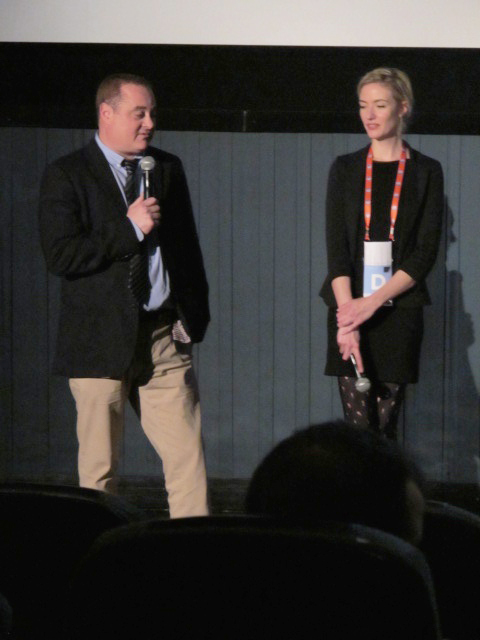
- Tirola at the Tribeca Film Festival showing of his documentary film National Lampoon: Drunk Stoned Brilliant Dead, 16 April 2015.
- Born: 1966; United States
- Occupation(s): Film director, producer

Douglas Tirola, also known as Doug Tirola, is an American filmmaker and writer who has worked as a director, executive producer and a producer. He is the owner and president of 4th Row Films, a movie and television production company. Tirola's work includes A Reason to Believe (1995), Hey Bartender (2013) and National Lampoon: Drunk Stoned Brilliant Dead (2015).

== Awards ==
Hey Bartender was nominated in the Special/Documentary category at the 2015 James Beard Foundation Broadcast Media Awards. Actress was nominated for Best Documentary at the 2014 Gotham Independent Film Awards. 2 nominations, 0 wins.

== Filmography ==
Projects Tirola has worked on include:

- Undercover Blues (1993)
- A Reason to Believe (1995)
- The Lucky Ones (2004)
- All In: The Poker Movie (2009)
- Making the Boys (2009)
- Folks! (2010)
- Fake It So Real (2011)
- Hey Bartender (2013)
- Actress (2014)
- Taking the Heat (TV Movie) (2015)
- The X Effect (TV series) (2015)
- National Lampoon: Drunk Stoned Brilliant Dead (2015)
- Bloodroot (2019)
- Bernstein's Wall (2021)
