= Gotham Independent Film Award for Best Actor =

Former annual US film award

The Gotham Independent Film Award for Best Actor was one of the annual Gotham Independent Film Awards awarded between 2013 and 2020. In 2021, it was replaced by the gender neutral awards for Outstanding Lead Performance and Outstanding Supporting Performance.

== Winners and nominees ==
=== 2010s ===
Year	Winner and nominees	Film	Role	Ref.
2013	Matthew McConaughey	Dallas Buyers Club	Ron Woodroof	
2013	Chiwetel Ejiofor	12 Years a Slave	Solomon Northup	
2013	Oscar Isaac	Inside Llewyn Davis	Llewyn Davis	
2013	Robert Redford	All Is Lost	Our Man	
2013	Isaiah Washington	Blue Caprice	John Muhammad	
2014	Michael Keaton	Birdman	Riggan Thomson	
2014	Bill Hader	The Skeleton Twins	Milo Dean	
2014	Ethan Hawke	Boyhood	Mason Evans Sr.	
2014	Oscar Isaac	A Most Violent Year	Abel Morales	
2014	Miles Teller	Whiplash	Andrew Neiman	
2015	Paul Dano	Love & Mercy	Brian Wilson - Past	
2015	Christopher Abbott	James White	James White	
2015	Kevin Corrigan	Results	Danny Flynn	
2015	Peter Sarsgaard	Experimenter	Stanley Milgram	
2015	Michael Shannon	99 Homes	Rick Carver	
2016	Casey Affleck	Manchester by the Sea	Lee Chandler	
2016	Jeff Bridges	Hell or High Water	Marcus Hamilton	
2016	Adam Driver	Paterson	Paterson	
2016	Joel Edgerton	Loving	Richard Loving	
2016	Craig Robinson	Morris from America	Curtis Gentry	
2017	James Franco	The Disaster Artist	Tommy Wiseau	
2017	Willem Dafoe	The Florida Project	Bobby Hicks	
2017	Daniel Kaluuya	Get Out	Chris Washington	
2017	Robert Pattinson	Good Time	Constantine "Connie" Nikas	
2017	Adam Sandler	The Meyerowitz Stories	Danny Meyerowitz	
2017	Harry Dean Stanton	Lucky	Lucky	
2018	Ethan Hawke	First Reformed	Ernst Toller	
2018	Adam Driver	BlacKkKlansman	Detective Flip Zimmerman	
2018	Ben Foster	Leave No Trace	Will	
2018	Richard E. Grant	Can You Ever Forgive Me?	Jack Hock	
2018	Lakeith Stanfield	Sorry to Bother You	Cassius "Cash" Green	
2019	Adam Driver	Marriage Story	Charlie Barber	
2019	Willem Dafoe	The Lighthouse	Thomas Wake	
2019	Aldis Hodge	Clemency	Anthony Woods	
2019	André Holland	High Flying Bird	Ray Burke	
2019	Adam Sandler	Uncut Gems	Howard Ratner	

=== 2020s ===
Year	Winner and nominees	Film	Role	Ref.
2020	Riz Ahmed	Sound of Metal	Ruben Stone	
2020	Chadwick Boseman (posthumous)	Ma Rainey's Black Bottom	Levee	
2020	Jude Law	The Nest	Rory O'Hara	
2020	John Magaro	First Cow	Otis "Cookie" Figowitz	
2020	Jesse Plemons	I'm Thinking of Ending Things	Jake	

== Multiple nominees ==
3 nominations

- Adam Driver

2 nominations

- Willem Dafoe
- Oscar Isaac
- Ethan Hawke
- Adam Sandler

== See also ==
- Academy Award for Best Actor
- Critics' Choice Movie Award for Best Actor
- Independent Spirit Award for Best Male Lead
- BAFTA Award for Best Actor in a Leading Role
- Golden Globe Award for Best Actor – Motion Picture Drama
- Golden Globe Award for Best Actor – Motion Picture Musical or Comedy
- Screen Actors Guild Award for Outstanding Performance by a Male Actor in a Leading Role
