= The Work (film) =

- Theatrical release poster
- Directed by: Jairus McLeary
- Produced by: Alice Henty; Eon McLeary; Jairus McLeary; Miles McLeary; Angela Sostre
- Cinematography: Arturo Santamaria
- Edited by: Amy Foote
- Music by: Adrian Miller
- Production company: Blanketfort Media
- Distributed by: The Orchard; Topic
- Release dates: March 11, 2017 (SXSW); October 20, 2017 (US)
- Running time: 87 minutes
- Country: United States
- Language: English
- Box office: $5,853

The Work is a 2017 American documentary film following three civilians on a four-day group therapy retreat with men who are incarcerated at Folsom State Prison. The film is the directorial debut of Jairus McLeary and was co-directed by Gethin Aldous. Jairus McLeary produced the film with Alice Henty and his brothers Eon McLeary and Miles McLeary.

== Crew ==
- Jairus McLeary – director, producer
- Gethin Aldous – co-director, executive producer
- James McLeary – executive producer
- Alice Henty – producer
- Eon McLeary – producer
- Miles McLeary – producer
- Angela Sostre – producer
- Arturo Santamaria – director of photography
- Mathew Rudenberg – camera operator
- Amy Foote – editor
- Tom Curley – sound designer

== Production ==
The Work centers on three civilians participating in a four-day group therapy retreat in Folsom State Prison in Folsom, California. The retreat is run by the Inside Circle Foundation, a non-profit organization of which James McLeary, the McLeary brothers' father and a psychologist, is chief executive officer and the retreat's organizer. Eon, Jairus, and Miles had volunteered in the program for over seven years, starting in 2001, and were eventually granted permission by Folsom's inmates to film there.

The film was shot in 2009 and 2010, and over 300 hours of footage was recorded by the time post-production began. Gethin Aldous, a "friend of a friend of a friend" of the McLearys, was brought in as a co-director in 2014 or 2015 after the McLearys insisted he do the program first. Aldous introduced the McLearys to editor Amy Foote, producer Alice Henty, and assistant editor Mike Vass who rounded out the post-production crew.

== Release ==
The Work premiered at South by Southwest on March 11, 2017, and won the Grand Jury Prize for Best Documentary Feature. The award was voted on by journalist Eugene Hernandez, film critic Ann Hornaday, and reporter Eric Hynes. The film's North American distribution rights were acquired by The Orchard and First Look Media's entertainment studio Topic on April 7, 2017, with The Orchard handling the film's theatrical distribution.

The film opened in New York City theaters on October 20, 2017, and in Los Angeles on October 27. The Work received a theatrical roll out in several other U.S. states starting on October 29 in Washington, with releases in 13 states spanning from October 31 to February 23, 2018.

=== Box office ===
The Work grossed $3,286 in Los Angeles on its opening weekend from October 27 to 29. It grossed $2,567 over the remainder of its Los Angeles release. The film closed on November 2, grossing $5,853 domestically.

=== Critical response ===
The review aggregator website Rotten Tomatoes reported a 100% approval rating based on 58 reviews, with an average score of 8.2/10. The website's critical consensus reads, "The Work takes a gut-wrenching look at lives all too often written off as lost causes, persuasively arguing that growth and change can be waiting where we least expect it." Metacritic, which uses a weighted average, assigned a score of 84 out of 100 based on 13 critics, indicating "universal acclaim".

Sean L. Malin of The Austin Chronicle praised Amy Foote's editing and the film's "impeccable fusion of dramatic timing, visual tension, and sociopolitical relevancy". Sheri Linden of The Hollywood Reporter called it a "remarkable piece of reportage", praising the pacing, absence of interviews, "dynamic camerawork of cinematographer Arturo Santamaria", and Foote's "astute editing". Peter Debrudge of Variety said that the film's "empathetic connection is so direct and so strong, audiences may be driven to weep as well", and praised the camerawork for "offering us a seat in the circle, or else directly over the shoulders of those involved".
