= Point and Shoot (film) =

- Promotional poster for Point and Shoot
- Directed by: Marshall Curry
- Written by: Marshall Curry
- Produced by: Marshall Curry; Elizabeth Martin; Matthew VanDyke
- Cinematography: Alan Jacobsen; Matthew VanDyke
- Edited by: Marshall Curry
- Music by: James Baxter
- Animation by: Joe Posner
- Production companies: Marshall Curry Productions LLC; ITVS; BBC; Cinereach
- Distributed by: The Orchard
- Release dates: April 18, 2014 (Tribeca Film Festival); October 31, 2014 (United States)
- Running time: 82 minutes
- Country: United States
- Language: English

Point and Shoot is a 2014 documentary film written and directed by Marshall Curry. It was produced by Marshall Curry, Elizabeth Martin and Matthew VanDyke.

== Synopsis ==
Point and Shoot tells the story of Matthew VanDyke, a sheltered 26-year-old who left his Baltimore home and set off on a self-described "crash course in manhood." While on a 35,000-mile motorcycle trip through Northern Africa and the Middle East, he struck up an unlikely friendship with a Libyan hippie. When revolution broke out in Libya, VanDyke decided to join his friend in the fight against dictator Muammar Gaddafi. With a gun in one hand and a camera in the other, VanDyke joined and documented the war until he was captured by Gaddafi forces and held for six months in solitary confinement.

== Release ==
The film was acquired by theatrical distributors The Orchard and was released in theaters on October 31, 2014.

== Reception ==
The film has a 74% approval rating on review aggregator Rotten Tomatoes, based on 54 reviews, with an average rating of 6.6/10. The website's critical consensus reads, "Thrilling and thought-provoking, Point and Shoot captures one man's fascinating — if troublingly narcissistic — 'crash course in manhood.'" On Metacritic, the film has a weighted average score of 65 out of 100, based on 23 critics, indicating "generally favorable reviews".

In The Washington Post, Ann Hornaday described the film as an "absorbing, ingeniously crafted documentary" that gives the viewer a "street-level glimpse of the realities of war." Stephen Holden wrote in The New York Times that the film suggests "the addictive rush of battlefield adventure is hard-wired into the male psyche." Peter Bradshaw criticized the film in The Guardian, stating that the movie focusses on VanDyke himself and fails to explore the wider geopolitical context of the Libyan conflict.

== Awards ==
- Tribeca Film Festival, Best Documentary Feature (winner)
- Independent Film Festival of Boston, Special Jury Prize (winner)
- Little Rock Film Festival, Special Jury Prize: Extraordinary Courage in Filmmaking - Matthew VanDyke (winner)
- Emmy Award, Outstanding Graphic Design & Art Direction (nominee)
- Gotham Independent Film Awards, Best Documentary (nominee)
- International Documentary Association, Best Documentary (nominee)
- Cinema Eye Honors, Outstanding Achievement in Editing (nominee)

== See also ==
- The Motorcycle Diaries (film)
- Long Way Down
- Long Way Round
