= Houston Film Critics Society Awards 2019 =

American film awards

13th Houston Film Critics Society Awards
- Date: January 2, 2020
- Location: Museum of Fine Arts, Houston, Texas
- Presented by: Houston Film Critics Society
- Website: houstonfilmcritics.com

The 13th Houston Film Critics Society Awards were held on January 2, 2020, at the Museum of Fine Arts, Houston (MFAH) in Texas. The nominations were announced on December 16, 2019.

== Winners and nominees ==
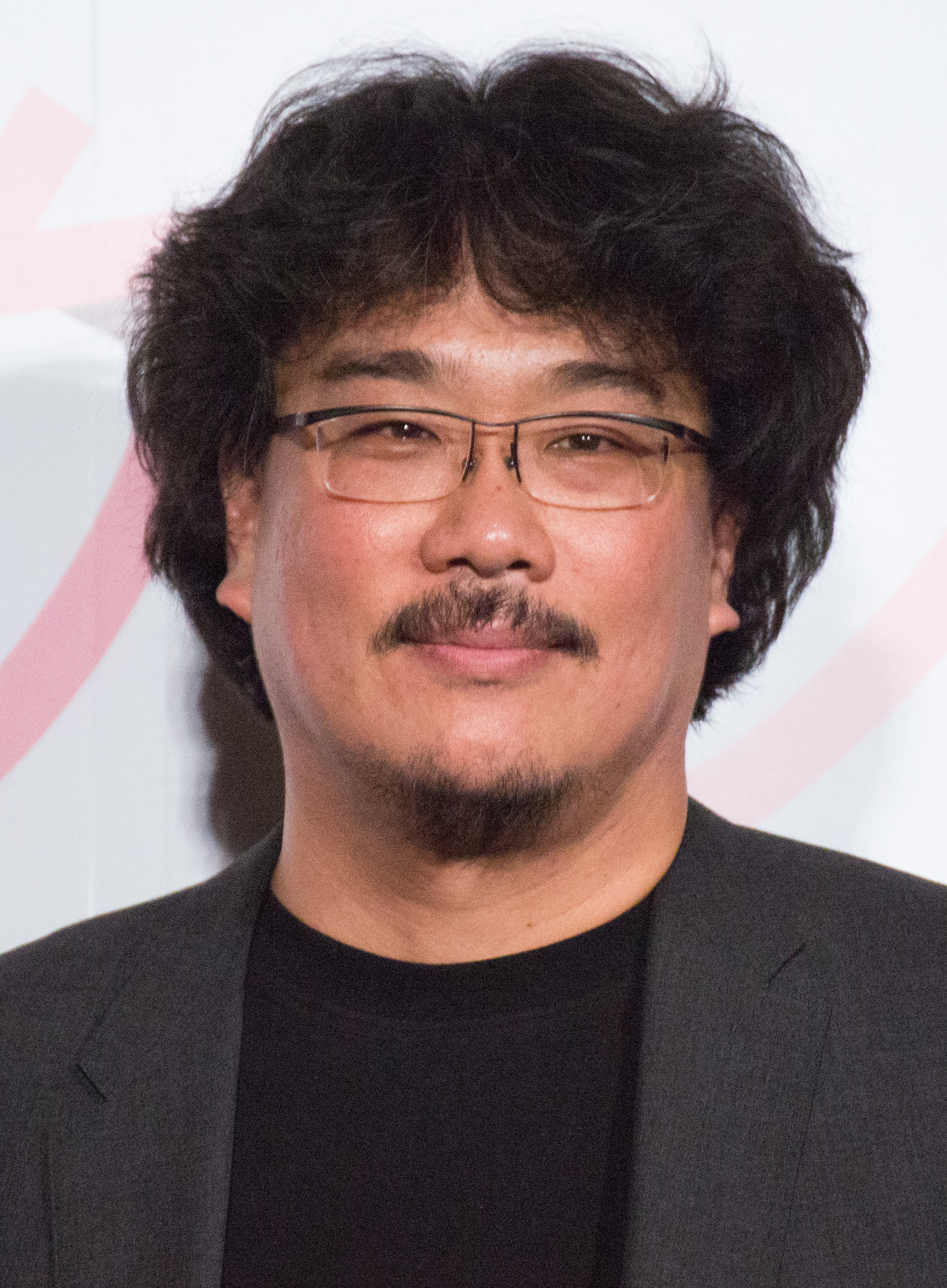
Bong Joon-ho, Best Director winner

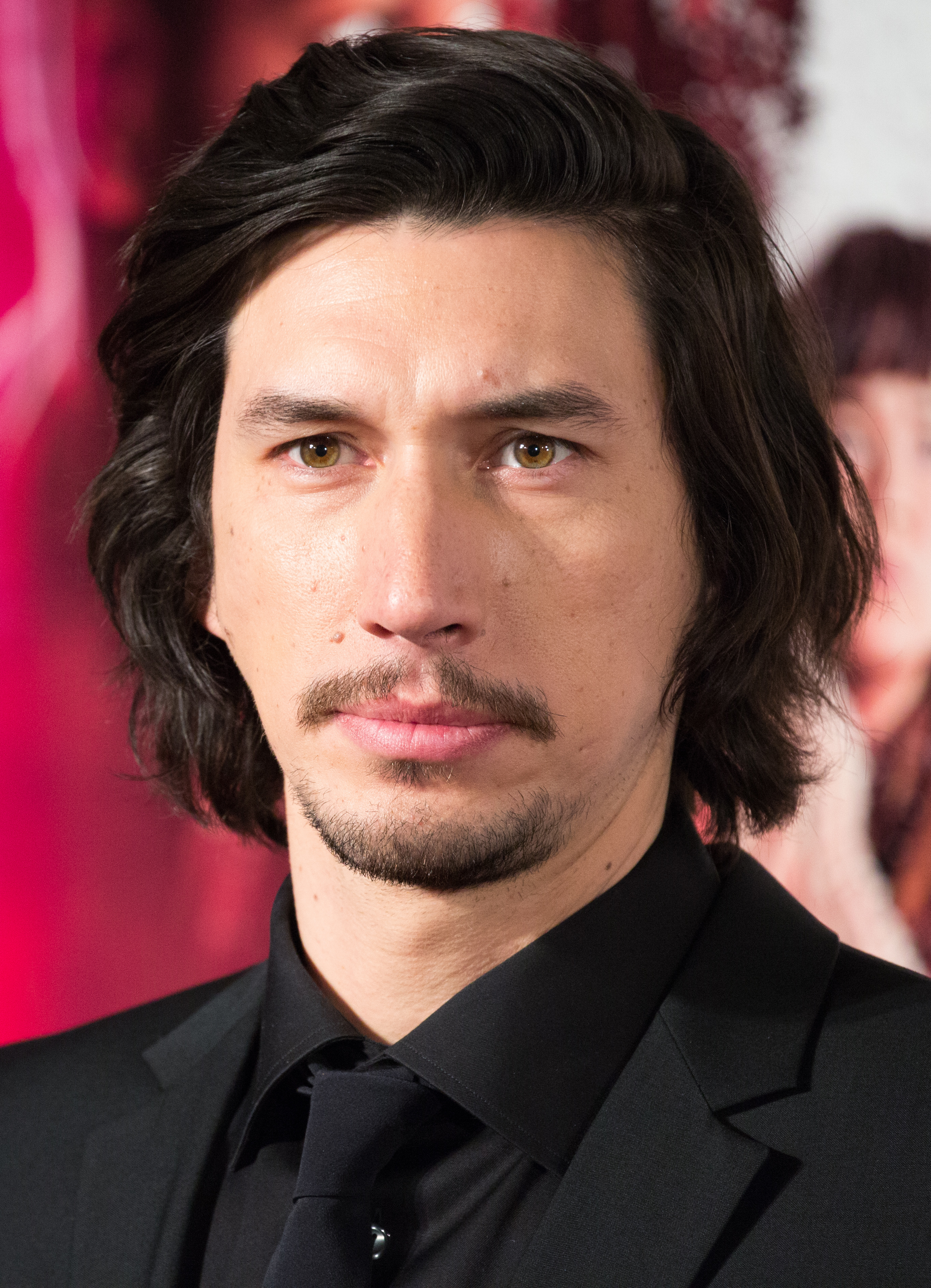
Adam Driver, Best Actor winner

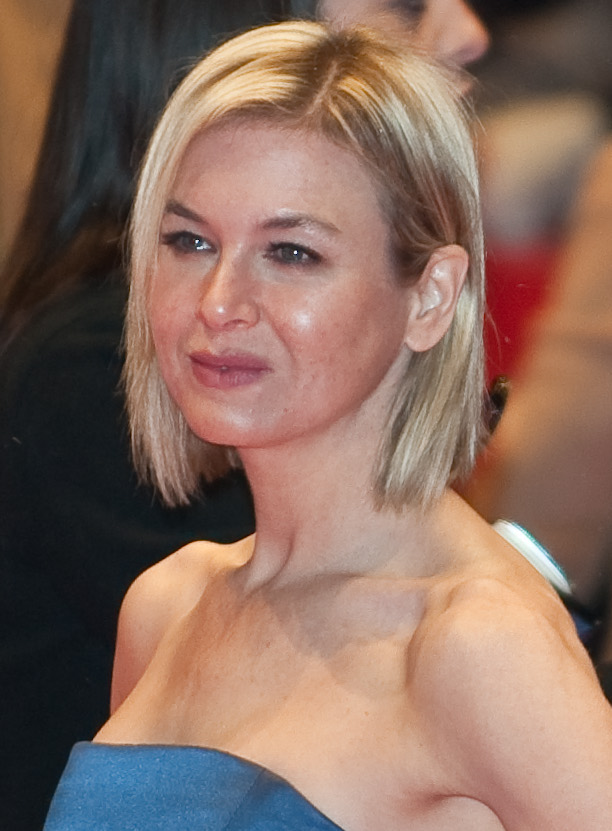
Renée Zellweger, Best Actress winner

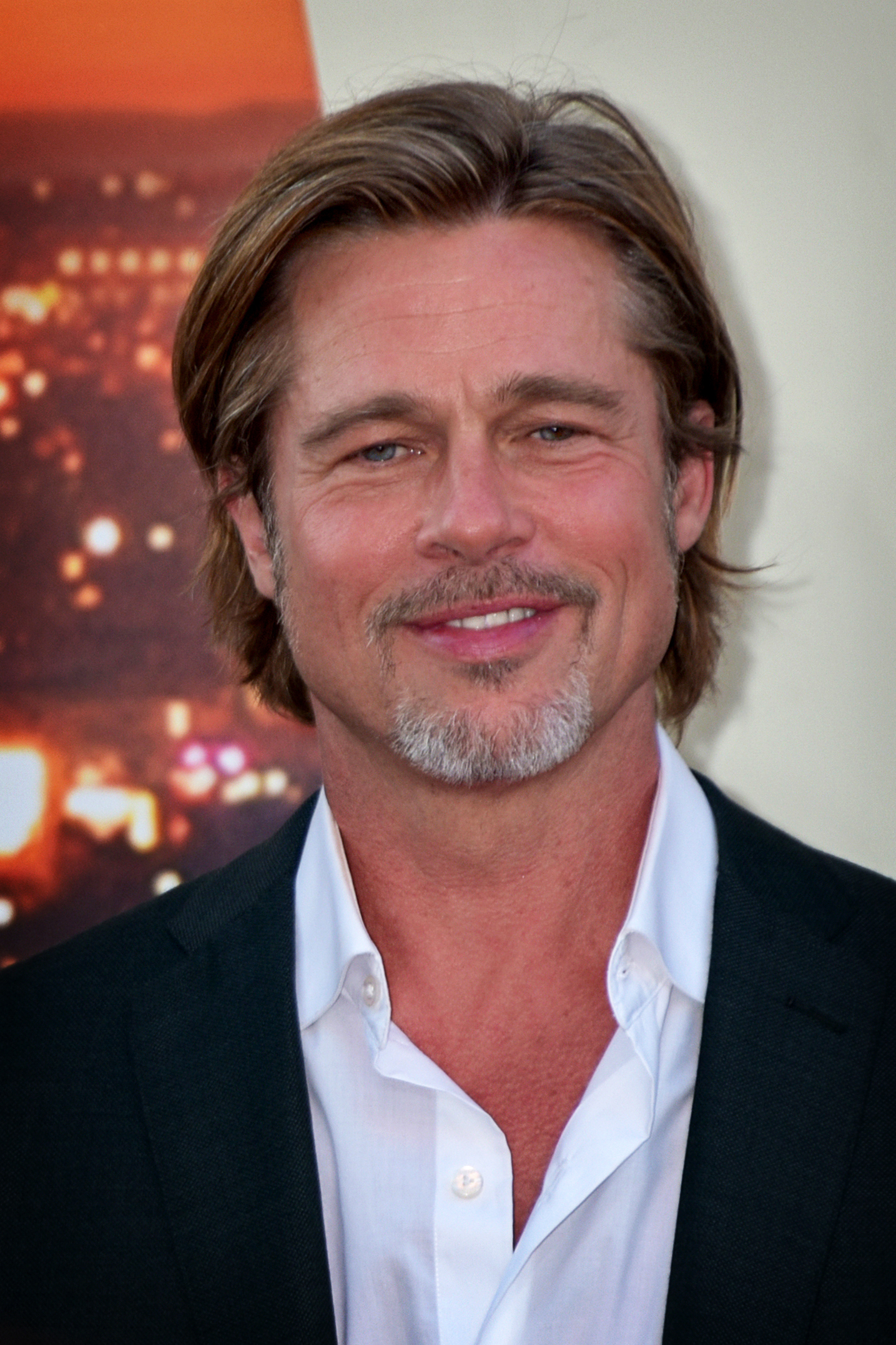
Brad Pitt, Best Supporting Actor winner

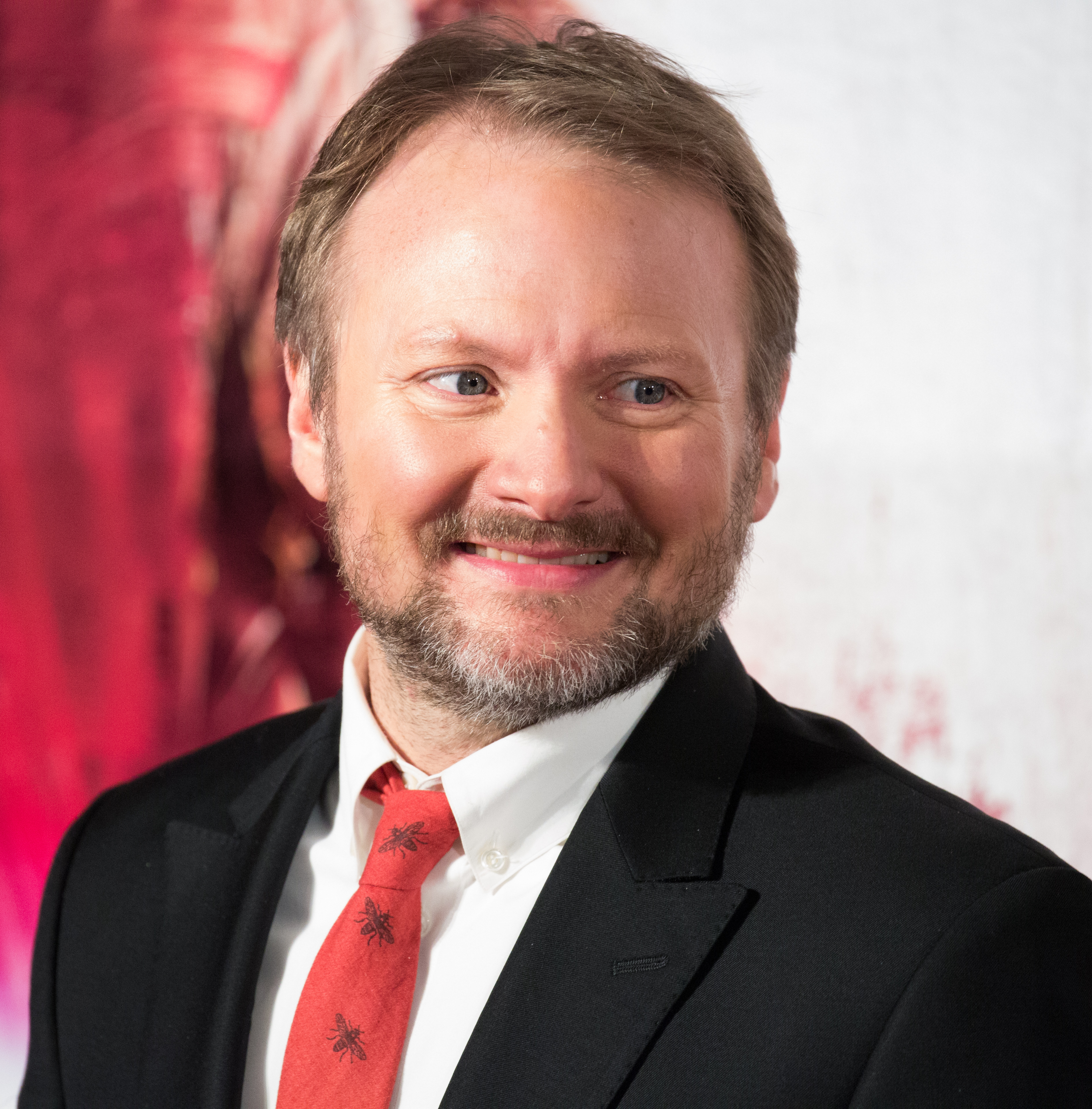
Rian Johnson, Best Screenplay winner

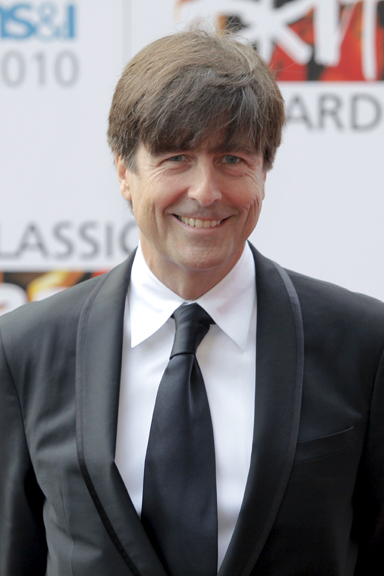
Thomas Newman, Best Original Score winner

Winners are listed first and highlighted with boldface.

Best Picture	Best Director
**Parasite**; 1917; The Farewell; The Irishman; Jojo Rabbit; Joker; Knives Out; Marriage Story; Once Upon a Time in Hollywood; Uncut Gems	**Bong Joon-ho – Parasite**; Sam Mendes – 1917; Martin Scorsese – The Irishman; Quentin Tarantino – Once Upon a Time in Hollywood; Lulu Wang – The Farewell
Best Actor	Best Actress
**Adam Driver – Marriage Story**; Leonardo DiCaprio – Once Upon a Time in Hollywood; Eddie Murphy – Dolemite Is My Name; Joaquin Phoenix – Joker; Adam Sandler – Uncut Gems	**Renée Zellweger – Judy**; Awkwafina – The Farewell; Scarlett Johansson – Marriage Story; Lupita Nyong'o – Us; Saoirse Ronan – Little Women; Charlize Theron – Bombshell
Best Supporting Actor	Best Supporting Actress
**Brad Pitt – Once Upon a Time in Hollywood**; Willem Dafoe – The Lighthouse; Anthony Hopkins – The Two Popes; Al Pacino – The Irishman; Joe Pesci – The Irishman	**Zhao Shu-zhen – The Farewell**; Kathy Bates – Richard Jewell; Laura Dern – Marriage Story; Scarlett Johansson – Jojo Rabbit; Florence Pugh – Little Women; Margot Robbie – Bombshell
Best Screenplay	Best Animated Feature
**Knives Out – Rian Johnson**; The Farewell – Lulu Wang; Marriage Story – Noah Baumbach; Once Upon a Time in Hollywood – Quentin Tarantino; Parasite – Bong Joon-ho and Han Jin-won	**Toy Story 4**; Frozen 2; How to Train Your Dragon: The Hidden World; I Lost My Body; Missing Link; A Shaun the Sheep Movie: Farmageddon
Best Documentary Feature	Best Foreign Language Film
**Apollo 11**; American Factory; The Biggest Little Farm; For Sama; Hail Satan?; They Shall Not Grow Old	**Parasite (South Korea)**; Atlantics (Senegal); Corpus Christi (Poland); Les Misérables (France); Monos (Colombia); Pain and Glory (Spain)
Best Original Score	Best Original Song
**1917 – Thomas Newman**; Joker – Hildur Guðnadóttir; Little Women – Alexandre Desplat; Marriage Story – Randy Newman; Us – Michael Abels	**"Glasgow (No Place Like Home)" – Wild Rose**; "Home to You" – The Aeronauts; "I Punched Keanu Reeves" – Always Be My Maybe; "(I'm Gonna) Love Me Again" – Rocketman; "Into the Unknown" – Frozen 2; "Stand Up" – Harriet
Best Cinematography	Best Visual Effects
**1917 – Roger Deakins**; The Irishman – Rodrigo Prieto; Joker – Lawrence Sher; Once Upon a Time in Hollywood – Robert Richardson; Parasite – Hong Kyung-pyo	**1917**; Ad Astra; Avengers: Endgame; Jumanji: The Next Level; The Lion King; Star Wars: The Rise of Skywalker
Best Movie Poster Art	Best Stunt Coordination Team
**Once Upon a Time in Hollywood**; Birds of Passage; John Wick: Chapter 3 – Parabellum; The Last Black Man in San Francisco; Parasite; Portrait of a Lady on Fire	**John Wick: Chapter 3 – Parabellum**; Crawl; Ford v Ferrari; Furie; Shadow
Texas Independent Film Award	Texas Independent Film Visionary
**Bull**; Building the American Dream; Nothing Stays the Same; Seadrift; Sleeping in Plastic; The Story of the Saxon Bar	**Tim Tsai – Seadrift**
Lifetime Achievement Award	Outstanding Achievement Award
**Roger Corman**	**Trey Edward Shults**

== Films with multiple nominations and awards ==
The following films received multiple nominations:

Nominations	Films
7	Once Upon a Time in Hollywood
6	Marriage Story
6	Parasite
5	1917
5	The Farewell
5	The Irishman
4	Joker
3	Little Women
2	Bombshell
2	Jojo Rabbit
2	Knives Out
2	Uncut Gems
2	Us

The following films received multiple awards:

Awards	Films
3	1917
3	Parasite
2	Once Upon a Time in Hollywood
