= List of awards and nominations received by Awkwafina =

Awkwafina awards and nominations
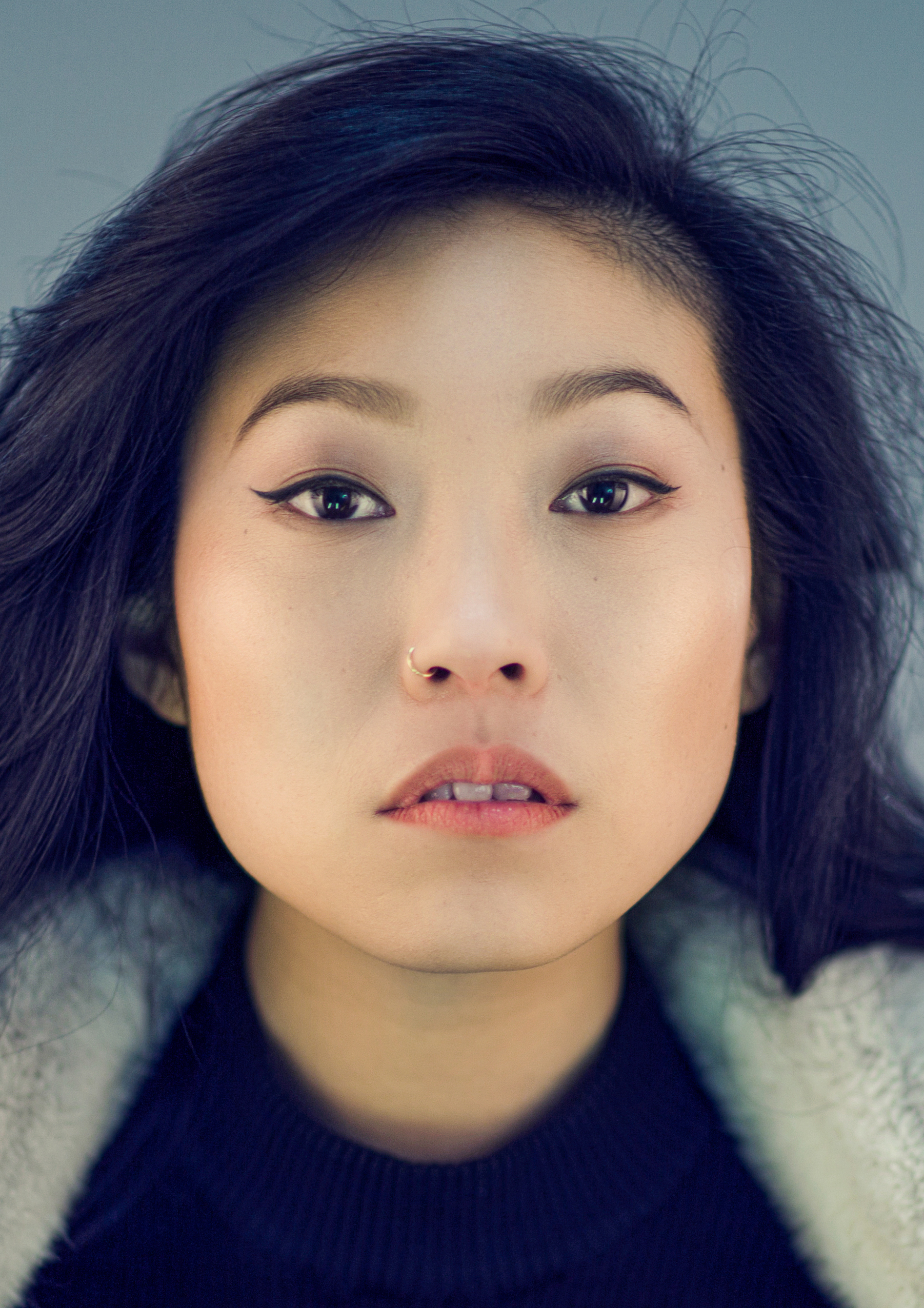
Awkwafina in 2018
Awards and nominations
Award	Wins	Nominations
Totals
AACTA Awards	0	1
Alliance of Women Film Journalists	0	1
The Asian Awards	1	1
Austin Film Critics Association	0	2
British Academy Film Awards	0	1
Chicago Film Critics Association	0	1
Critics' Choice Movie Awards	0	1
Children's and Family Emmy Awards	0	1
Dallas–Fort Worth Film Critics Association	1	1
Dorian Awards	1	1
Dublin Film Critics' Circle Awards	1	1
Georgia Film Critics Association	0	1
Golden Globe Awards	1	1
Gotham Awards	1	1
Hawaii International Film Festival	1	1
Hollywood Creative Alliance	0	2
Houston Film Critics Society	0	1
IndieWire Critics Poll	1	1
MTV Movie & TV Awards	0	2
Nickelodeon Kids' Choice Awards	0	3
Online Film Critics Society	0	1
Primetime Emmy Awards	1	2
San Diego Film Critics Society Awards	0	2
San Francisco Bay Area Film Critics Circle	0	1
Santa Barbara International Film Festival	1	1
Saturn Awards	0	1
Screen Actors Guild Awards	0	1
Seattle Film Critics Society	0	1
Teen Choice Awards	0	1
Washington D.C. Area Film Critics Association	0	1
Wins	8
Nominations	39

Nora Lum (Chinese: 林家珍; pinyin: Lín Jiāzhēn), known professionally as Awkwafina, is an American actress, comedian, writer, producer, and rapper. In 2014, Awkwafina debuted as an actress from the third season of Girl Code. Before rising to prominence, she played supporting roles in the comedy films Neighbors 2: Sorority Rising (2016), Ocean's 8 (2018), and Jumanji: The Next Level (2019). In 2018, Awkwafina starred in Jon M. Chu's romantic-comedy Crazy Rich Asians. Her performance in the film was widely praised by the critics and audiences. Awkwafina, went on to win the Satellite Award for Best Actress in a Motion Picture – Comedy or Musical, and she was nominated for the Screen Actors Guild Award for Outstanding Performance by a Cast in a Motion Picture, MTV Movie Award for Best Comedic Performance, and MTV Movie Award for Best Breakthrough Performance.

In 2019, Awkwafina appeared in Lulu Wang's comedy-drama The Farewell. A film about a Chinese-American family who discover that their grandmother has only a short while left to live, they decide not to tell her and schedule a family gathering before she dies. Her performance in the film was widely praised by the critics and she went on to win numerous accolades. Awkwafina won the Satellite Award for Best Actress in a Motion Picture – Comedy or Musical, Golden Globe Award for Best Actress in a Motion Picture – Musical or Comedy, Virtuoso Award from the Santa Barbara International Film Festival, and the Gotham Independent Film Award for Best Actress. She became the first woman of Asian descent to capture a Golden Globe in a lead actress film category after winning Best Actress – Motion Picture Comedy or Musical. In 2020, Awkwafina was nominated for the BAFTA Rising Star Award.

For starring and producing the TV movie Quiz Lady (2023), she won the Primetime Emmy Award for Outstanding Television Movie.

== Awards and nominations ==
Awards and nominations received by Awkwafina
Award	Year	Category	Nominated work	Result	Ref.
AACTA Awards	2019	Best International Lead Actress	The Farewell	Nominated	
Alliance of Women Film Journalists	2019	Best Actress	The Farewell	Nominated	
Alliance of Women Film Journalists	2019	Best Breakthrough Performance	The Farewell	Nominated	
The Asian Awards	2019	Outstanding Achievement in Cinema	Crazy Rich Asians	Won (Note: Award shared with other main cast members)	
Austin Film Critics Association	2019	Best Actress	The Farewell	Nominated	
Austin Film Critics Association	2019	Breakthrough Artist Award	The Farewell	Nominated	
British Academy Film Awards	2019	Rising Star Award	—	Nominated	
Critics' Choice Movie Awards	2019	Best Actress	The Farewell	Nominated	
Children's and Family Emmy Awards	2024	Outstanding Children's Personality	A Real Bug's Life	Nominated	
Online Film Critics Society	2019	Best Actress	The Farewell	Nominated	
Dorian Awards	2019	We're Wilde About You / Rising Star of the Year	—	Won	
Dorian Awards	2020	Film Performance of the Year – Actress	The Farewell	Nominated	
Dallas–Fort Worth Film Critics Association	2019	Best Actress	The Farewell	5th Place	
Dublin Film Critics' Circle	2019	Best Actress	The Farewell	8th place	
Golden Globe Awards	2019	Best Actress in a Motion Picture – Musical or Comedy	The Farewell	Won	
Gotham Awards	2019	Best Actress	The Farewell	Won	
Georgia Film Critics Association	2019	Best Actress	The Farewell	Nominated	
Hawaii International Film Festival	2018	Halekulani Maverick Award	—	Won	
Hollywood Creative Alliance	2019	Best Actress	The Farewell	Nominated	
Hollywood Creative Alliance	2024	Best Actress in a Limited Series or TV Movie	Quiz Lady	Nominated	
Houston Film Critics Society	2019	Best Actress	The Farewell	Nominated	
IndieWire Critics Poll	2019	Best Actress	The Farewell	5th place	
MTV Movie & TV Awards	2019	Best Comedic Performance	Crazy Rich Asians	Nominated	
MTV Movie & TV Awards	2019	Best Breakthrough Performance	Crazy Rich Asians	Nominated	
Nickelodeon Kids' Choice Awards	2022	Favorite Voice from an Animated Movie	The SpongeBob Movie: Sponge on the Run and Raya and the Last Dragon	Nominated	
Nickelodeon Kids' Choice Awards	2023	Favorite Voice from an Animated Movie (Female)	The Bad Guys	Nominated	
Nickelodeon Kids' Choice Awards	2024	Favorite Female Voice from an Animated Movie	Kung Fu Panda 4	Nominated	
Online Film Critics Society	2019	Best Actress	The Farewell	Nominated	
Primetime Emmy Awards	2023	Outstanding Short Form Comedy, Drama or Variety Series	Awkwafina is Hangin' with Grandma (Note: Credited as Nora Lum.)	Nominated	
Primetime Emmy Awards	2024	Outstanding Television Movie	Quiz Lady (Note: As a producer.)	Won	
Screen Actors Guild Awards	2018	Outstanding Performance by a Cast in a Motion Picture	Crazy Rich Asians	Nominated	
Satellite Awards	2019	Best Actress in a Motion Picture – Comedy or Musical	The Farewell	Won	
Saturn Awards	2022	Best Film Supporting Actress	Shang-Chi and the Legend of the Ten Rings	Won	
San Diego Film Critics Society	2018	Best Comedic Performance	Crazy Rich Asians	Nominated	
San Diego Film Critics Society	2019	Best Actress	The Farewell	Nominated	
Seattle Film Critics Society	2019	Best Actress	The Farewell	Nominated	
San Francisco Bay Area Film Critics Circle	2019	Best Actress	The Farewell	Nominated	
Santa Barbara International Film Festival	2020	Virtuoso Award	The Farewell	Won	
Teen Choice Awards	2019	Choice Comedy Movie Actress	Crazy Rich Asians	Nominated	
Washington D.C. Area Film Critics Association	2019	Best Actress	The Farewell	Nominated	
