= Children of the New World =

Collection of science fiction short stories

- Cover of the book
- Author: Alexander Weinstein
- Language: English
- Genre: Science fiction, Short Stories
- Publisher: Picador (imprint)
- Publication date: September 13. 2016
- Publication place: United States
- Media type: Print (paperback), e-book
- Pages: 240
- ISBN: 978-1250098993

Children of the New World is a collection of science fiction short stories by Alexander Weinstein.

== Content ==
- "Saying Goodbye to Yang"
- "The Cartographers"
- "Heartland"
- "Excerpts from The New World Authorized Dictionary"
- "Moksha"
- "Children of the New World"
- "Fall Line"
- "A Brief History of Failed Revolution"
- "Migration"
- "The Pyramid and the Ass"
- "Rocket Night"
- "Openness"
- "Iceage"

== Reception ==
Children of the New World was chosen by The New York Times as one of the 100 Notable Books of 2016.

== Film adaptations ==
In June 2018, it was reported that producer Theresa Park had acquired the screen rights to "Saying Goodbye to Yang". It was later announced that the adaptation would be directed by South Korean-American filmmaker Kogonada. The film, titled After Yang, was released in 2021.

Lulu Wang, director of The Farewell, announced in July 2019 that she was working on a sci-fi film as an adaptation of the book.
