= Matthew Friedman (film editor) =

American film editor

Matthew Friedman is an American film editor and senior lecturer at the AFI Conservatory. He won the American Cinema Editors Eddie Award for best feature film editing for his work on Palm Springs, which broke the existing Sundance film sales record by sixty-nine cents. Friedman was nominated for the ACE Eddie the previous year as well for The Farewell, his third collaboration with director Lulu Wang,

His credits also include John Tucker Must Die, What Happens in Vegas, Step Up Revolution, and Alvin and the Chipmunks: The Squeakquel. (edited the second film of Alvin and the Chipmunks; following the retirement of Peter E. Berger) Friedman played the voice of the talking bird in Scary Movie 2.

Friedman is a member of the American Cinema Editors and the Academy of Motion Picture Arts and Sciences.

== Partial filmography ==
Year	Film	Director	Notes
2006	John Tucker Must Die	Betty Thomas	
2008	What Happens in Vegas	Tom Vaughan	
2009	Dragonball Evolution	James Wong	
2009	Alvin and the Chipmunks: The Squeakquel	Betty Thomas	
2012	Step Up Revolution	Scott Speer	
2014	Posthumous	Lulu Wang	
2015	Touch	Lulu Wang	Short Film
2018	Step Sisters	Charles Stone III	
2019	The Farewell	Lulu Wang	Nominated — ACE Eddie for Best Edited Feature Film - Comedy or Musical
2020	Life in a Year	Mitja Okorn	
2020	Palm Springs	Max Barbikow	Won — ACE Eddie for Best Edited Feature Film - Comedy or Musical
2021	The Starling	Theodore Melfi	
