= Blaccent =

Accent associated with AAVE

Blaccent (a portmanteau of black and accent; also sometimes spelled as blackcent) is a term used, broadly, to describe the accent associated with African-American Vernacular English (AAVE). It is most commonly used to describe the often feigned use of AAVE by non-black people, which is considered by critics to be a form of cultural appropriation. In the 2010s and 2020s, it became prominently associated with non-black media figures, such as rapper Iggy Azalea and actress Awkwafina. The use of blaccents in American entertainment has been traced back to 19th-century blackface performances and rock history. The term has also been applied in politics, such as when Hillary Clinton was criticized for using one during her 2008 U.S. presidential campaign.

== Definition and criticism ==
The term blaccent is a portmanteau of the words black and accent. It can be used to describe any accent associated with the use of African-American Vernacular English (AAVE), but is more commonly used to describe a feigned or affected accent used by those who are not African-American in an attempt to imitate AAVE speech patterns. The first usage of the term blaccent to describe African-American accents in general appeared on forums online in 2003, though it became more commonly associated with non-black imitations of AAVE by the 2010s.

Criticisms of blaccents often view them as a form of cultural appropriation and stem from their being used to make their users appear cool, typically for financial gain. American author Mikki Kendall stated that a blaccent is a "fake accent racists and cultural appropriators use when they mimic black people" despite African-Americans not all sharing the same accent. American activist Bree Newsome has decried blaccents as a form of minstrelsy, particularly due to their users' discarding of it upon wanting to "distance themselves from blackness", while professor Danielle Bainbridge likened it to what she called "vocal blackface". For The New York Times, linguist John McWhorter wrote that the perception of non-black individuals' blaccents were distinct from those of black people due to the potential for linguistic discrimination against the latter group.

== In entertainment ==
For the Journal of the American Musicological Society, Matthew D. Morrison wrote that the stereotypical dialect used in Thomas D. Rice's 19th-century blackface performances of the song "Jump Jim Crow" as the character Jim Crow served as a precursor to the blaccent. Blaccents have been popular in American entertainment since the 1920s according to Bainbridge, who has pointed to the radio series Amos 'n' Andy, which featured white actors playing black characters, and Elvis Presley's success after his 1956 recording of the song "Hound Dog" as early examples of blaccents in American media. Author Carvell Wallace wrote in 2016 that blaccents were "so deeply woven into rock history that we usually don't notice it", citing Presley, Roger Daltrey, Mick Jagger, Janis Joplin, Joe Cocker, and Sting as examples. For Vulture, Lauren Michele Jackson also wrote that blaccents "apart from the actual speech patterns of black people" have been used "since America had a theater tradition to call its own".

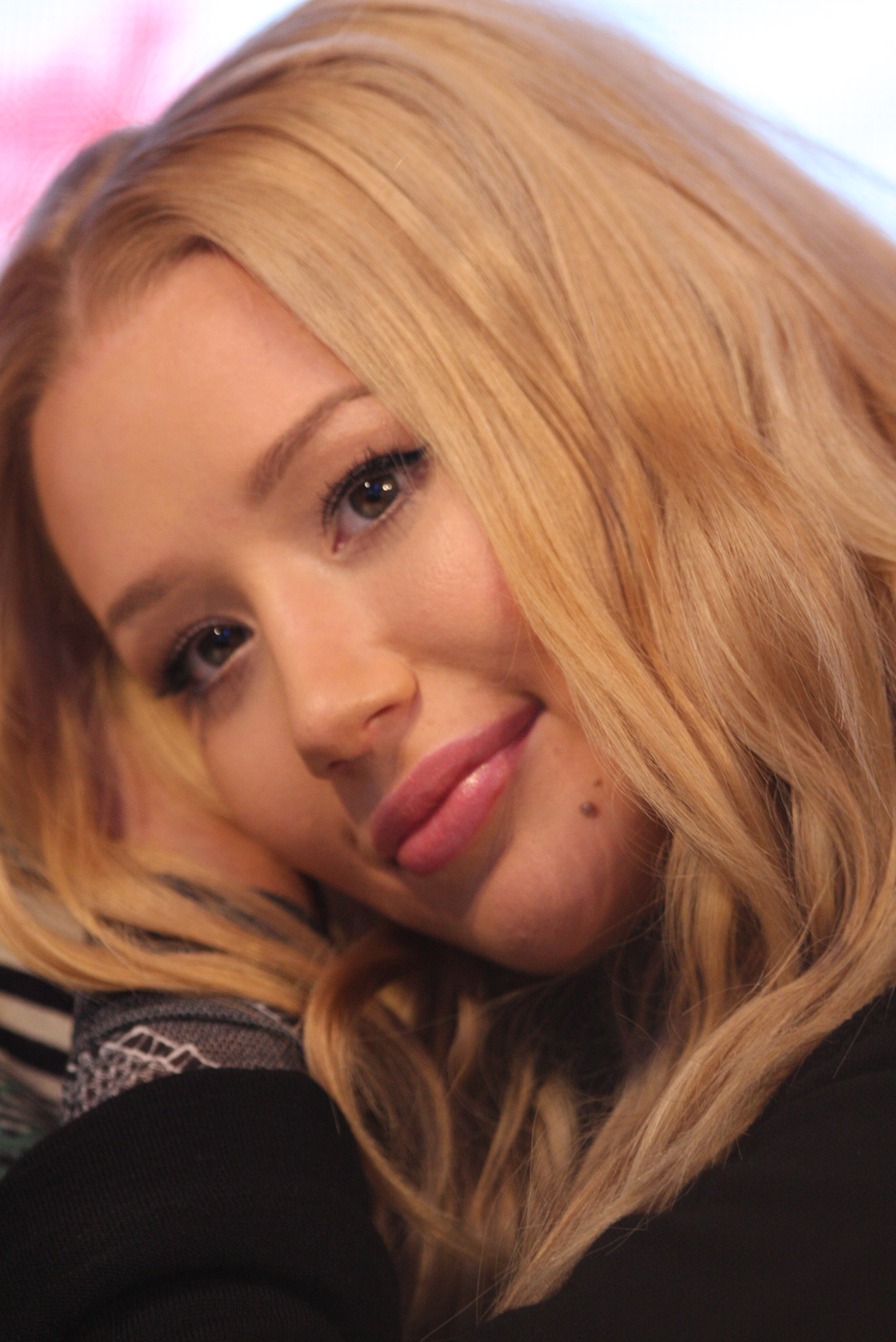
The term blaccent became associated with Australian rapper Iggy Azalea (pictured) starting in 2015 due to her rapping voice, which mimicked patterns of AAVE

In 2015, rapper Eve used the term "blaccent" to describe the rapping voice of Iggy Azalea, a white Australian rapper. The term "blaccent" was later used frequently to describe and criticize Azalea's rapping style. A 2015 assessment of Azalea's discography by linguists Maeve Eberhardt and Kara Freeman published in the Journal of Sociolinguistics concluded that Azalea's success due to the "overzealous" use of AAVE in her music, including through a more frequent lack of copula in her music than other black rappers and her use of the monophthongal ai, was reliant on appropriation and white privilege. Kristen S. He of Vice wrote in 2017 that Azalea had "conditioned us to hear blaccents as both inauthentic and offensive".

Bhad Bhabie first rose to fame due to her blaccent on a viral 2016 episode of the talk show Dr. Phil and for her saying the phrase, "Catch me outside, how 'bout that?" A 2016 MTV.com op-ed by Wallace accused Meghan Trainor of using a blaccent on her song "No", with Sean L. Maloney writing for Nashville Scene the year prior that she "loves slathering her faux-Southern blaccent all over every song". Trainor later stated that her voice was derived from her father being "very soulful" and "think[ing] he's James Brown sometimes". Social media users accused Ariana Grande of using a blaccent in a 2018 interview for Billboard, in which she described a photo of herself as a baby by saying, "Bitch, that's my cookie, that's my juice, okay? Carry on. Thank you, next." YouTuber Lilly Singh faced criticisms of cultural appropriation, partially based on her alleged use of a blaccent, in 2019. For The Cut, Lauren Levy wrote in 2019 that a crop of influencers, including Lil Tay, Bhad Bhabie, and Woah Vicky, had become known for being "white but speak[ing] in blaccent", among other attributes, in order to become "living, breathing memes".

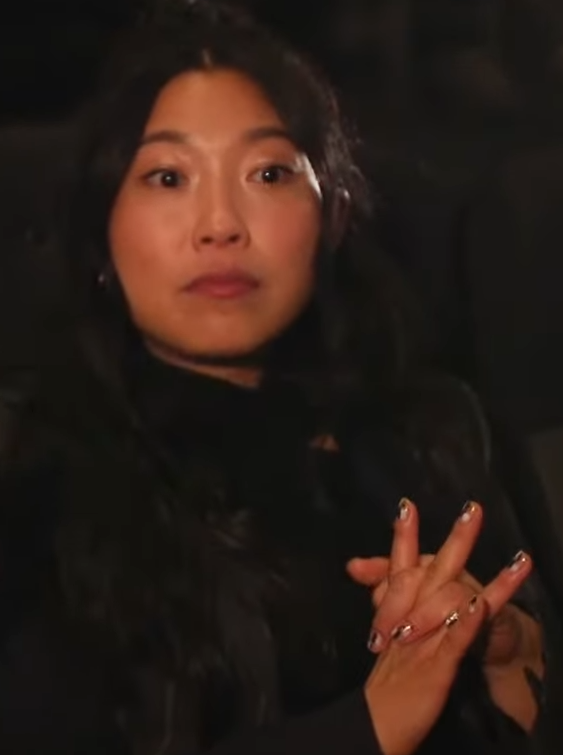
American actress and rapper Awkwafina (pictured) became a prominent subject of blaccent accusations in the early 2020s on social media due to her roles in the 2018 films Crazy Rich Asians and Ocean's 8

Awkwafina, an American actress and rapper of Asian descent, came under fire in the late 2010s and early 2020s for her alleged use of a blaccent in her comedy, her music, such as in her 2012 song "My Vag", and in her film roles, particularly her character of Peik Lin in the 2018 film Crazy Rich Asians, who uses aspects of AAVE such as the habitual be, and in Ocean's 8, particularly on social media. According to Jackson, Awkwafina's use of a blaccent in Crazy Rich Asians revitalized the use of the term itself in 2018, which had "hardly [been] seen since Iggy Azalea could claim song of the summer". In a 2021 interview with Reuters about her blaccent, she stated that she was "open to the conversation" and that it was "a little bit multi-faceted and layered". She also faced backlash that year due to a resurfaced interview with Vice about her refusal to do accents for a role, which Twitter users criticized as antithetical to her use of a blaccent. She tweeted an apology in 2022, attributing her "American identity" to her schoolmates as a child, the films and television shows she watched growing up, and her love of hip hop music. Critics and social media users criticized her statement as a non-apology apology for the blaccent and she soon announced her departure from Twitter. In 2023, Nardos Haile of Salon wrote that her blaccent was "thick" and "infamous" and jokingly called her a "blaccent queen".

Other non-black celebrities also courted controversy for using blaccents throughout the 2020s, including singer Olivia Rodrigo, actor Chet Hanks, YouTuber Bretman Rock, and model Alex Consani. The 2020 film Zola stars Riley Keough as Stefani, a stripper who speaks in a blaccent. Its director, Janicza Bravo, described the character's blaccent as intentionally making the character seem like "a minstrel". In Britney Spears's 2023 memoir The Woman in Me, she described an instance in which her ex-boyfriend, Justin Timberlake, spoke in a blaccent to singer Ginuwine by saying "fo shiz" and calling him his "homie". A clip of Michelle Williams reading the passage for the audiobook version of the memoir went viral online soon after its release and sparked discussions online about the use of blaccents for commercial gain.

Comedian Matt Rife was described, both by Vox in 2023 and by McWhorter for The New York Times in 2024, as using a blaccent in several of his stand-up comedy routines.

== In politics ==
During her 2008 U.S. presidential campaign, Hillary Clinton was criticized in the media for what critics described as her putting on a "blackcent" or "black-cent" when speaking to black audiences, particularly while speaking at the historically black First Baptist Church in Selma, Alabama in March 2007.

In 2019, conservative media outlets, including Fox News, the Washington Examiner, Newsmax, and The Daily Wire, accused U.S. representative Alexandria Ocasio-Cortez of affecting a blaccent during a speech for a mostly black audience at a convention for Al Sharpton's civil rights organization, the National Action Network. Ocasio-Cortez tweeted that she "grew up in a distinct linguistic culture & had to learn to navigate class enviros at school/work" in response to the accusations, adding, "I am from the Bronx. I act & talk like it."
