= Zhao Shu-zhen =

Chinese actress

- 趙淑珍
- Born: 1944 (age 80–81); Harbin, Heilongjiang, Manchukuo
- Occupation: Actress

Zhao Shu-zhen
- Simplified Chinese: 赵淑珍
- Traditional Chinese: 趙淑珍
Transcriptions
Standard Mandarin
- Hanyu Pinyin: Zhào Shūzhēn

Zhao Shu-zhen (Chinese: 趙淑珍; born c. 1944) is a Chinese film, stage and television actress. She is best known internationally for her portrayal of the grandmother (Nai Nai 奶奶 Nǎinai, which means paternal grandmother in Mandarin) in Lulu Wang's film The Farewell (2019), which earned her many accolades including the Independent Spirit Award for Best Supporting Female.

== Career ==
Zhao has appeared in over 100 plays for the Harbin Grand Theatre.

Zhao's role as Nai Nai in The Farewell has received critical acclaim and numerous awards. For the role, she won Best Supporting Actress from the San Diego Film Critics Society Awards 2019, the Houston Film Critics Society Awards 2019, and the 2019 Chicago Indie Critics Awards and a 2020 Independent Spirit Award for Best Supporting Female.

== Filmography ==
=== Film ===
| Year | Title | Role | Notes |
|---|---|---|---|
| 2019 | The Farewell | Nai Nai (奶奶) | |

=== Television ===
| Year | Title | Role | Notes |
|---|---|---|---|
| 2018–2019 | The Story of Ming Lan | Wang Lao Tai Tai | |

== Awards and nominations ==
| Year | Award | Category | Nominated work | Result |
|---|---|---|---|---|
| 2018 | The Actors of China | Best Performance by an Actress-Red Team | The Story of Ming Lan | Nominated |
| 2019 | Detroit Film Critics Society Awards | Best Supporting Actress | The Farewell | Won |
| 2019 | Los Angeles Film Critics Association | Best Supporting Actress | The Farewell | Runner-up |
| 2019 | 24th Satellite Awards | Best Supporting Actress | The Farewell | Nominated |
| 2020 | 25th Critics' Choice Awards | Best Supporting Actress | The Farewell | Nominated |
| 2020 | 35th Independent Spirit Awards | Best Supporting Female | The Farewell | Won |
| 2020 | Hollywood Critics Association Awards | Best Supporting Actress | The Farewell | Nominated |
| 2020 | Chicago Film Critics Association | Best Supporting Actress | The Farewell | Nominated |
| 2020 | Chicago Independent Film Critics Circle Awards | Best Supporting Actress | The Farewell | Won |
| 2020 | Houston Film Critics Society Awards | Best Supporting Actress | The Farewell | Won |
| 2020 | Central Ohio Film Critics Association | Best Supporting Actress | The Farewell | Nominated |
| 2020 | Georgia Film Critics Association Awards | Best Supporting Actress | The Farewell | Nominated |
| 2020 | Florida Film Critics Circle | Best Supporting Actress | The Farewell | Nominated |
| 2020 | AARP Movies For Grownups | Best Supporting Actress | The Farewell | Nominated |
| 2020 | Gold Derby Awards | Supporting Actress | The Farewell | Won |
| 2020 | Gold Derby Awards | Breakthrough Performer | The Farewell | Nominated |
| 2020 | Online Film Critics Society Awards | Best Supporting Actress | The Farewell | Nominated |
| 2020 | San Diego Film Critics Society Awards | Best Supporting Actress | The Farewell | Won |
| 2020 | Seattle Film Critics Awards | Best Supporting Actress | The Farewell | Nominated |
| 2020 | Washington DC Area Film Critics Association Awards | Best Supporting Actress | The Farewell | Won |
| 2020 | San Francisco Film Critics Circle | Best Supporting Actress | The Farewell | Nominated |
| 2020 | Alliance of Women Film Journalists | Actress Defying Age and Ageism | The Farewell | Won |
| 2020 | Alliance of Women Film Journalists | Best Supporting Actress | The Farewell | Won |
