= After Yang =

2021 American film by Kogonada

- Theatrical release poster
- Directed by: Kogonada
- Written by: Kogonada
- Based on: "Saying Goodbye to Yang" by Alexander Weinstein
- Produced by: Theresa Park; Andrew Goldman; Caroline Kaplan; Paul Mezey
- Starring: Colin Farrell; Jodie Turner-Smith; Justin H. Min; Malea Emma Tjandrawidjaja; Haley Lu Richardson
- Cinematography: Benjamin Loeb
- Edited by: Kogonada
- Music by: Aska Matsumiya; Ryuichi Sakamoto
- Production companies: A24; Cinereach; Per Capita Productions
- Distributed by: A24; Showtime
- Release dates: July 8, 2021 (Cannes); March 4, 2022 (United States)
- Running time: 96 minutes
- Country: United States
- Language: English
- Budget: $9–20 million
- Box office: $729,254

After Yang is a 2021 American science fiction drama film written, directed, and edited by Kogonada. It stars Colin Farrell, Jodie Turner-Smith, Justin H. Min, Malea Emma Tjandrawidjaja, and Haley Lu Richardson. It is one of the final feature films (Note: Along with Hirokazu Kore-eda’s Monster.) scored by composer Ryuichi Sakamoto before his death in 2023. The plot follows a family's attempts to repair their android son after he becomes unresponsive, and can no longer assist their adoptive Chinese daughter. It delves into themes of memory, mortality, loss, and what it means to be human.

The film had its world premiere at the Cannes Film Festival on July 8, 2021, and was released on March 4, 2022, by A24 and Showtime. It received generally positive reviews from critics. Since its release, it has been cited as among the best films of the 2020s and the best science fiction films of the 21st century.

== Plot ==
In a calm, "cozy," yet distant and unspecified future following an implied, non-dystopian, post-apocalyptic event, Jake and Kyra live with their adopted daughter, Mika, as well as Yang, a robotic teenage boy. Jake and Kyra bought Yang, a culture unit, as a way for Mika to connect with her Chinese heritage through sharing stories and facts. One day, following a family dance competition, Yang becomes unresponsive; however, he is no longer under warranty as he had been bought from defunct reseller Second Siblings, instead of his original manufacturer, Brothers & Sisters Incorporated. Jake, whose tea shop is struggling, seeks an affordable way to repair Yang.

A local repair store, Quick Fix, runs a diagnostic test and finds that Yang's computing core has malfunctioned and needs replacing; the technician recommends outfitting Yang with an entirely new unit before his body begins to decompose, a substantial financial cost. However, as Jake realizes how upset Mika is at the loss of her "brother", he becomes determined to save Yang, out of principle, despite Kyra's suggestion that Mika could benefit from experiencing grief. In a flashback, Yang reassures a curious Mika that she is still a valuable part of their family, despite their adoption of her.

On the recommendation of his neighbor, George, Jake takes Yang to Russ, a backstreet technician who offers to perform an illegal repair of Yang's core (against the original manufacturer’s terms and Brothers & Sisters' user agreement). Russ discovers what he believes to be a hidden camera inside of Yang; Jake takes the "camera" to a museum specialist named Cleo, who tells him that it is, in fact, Yang's memory bank—a device that records each unit's key experiences, which Brothers & Sisters has long denied exists, in order to avoid a "privacy" scandal. Jake watches Yang's "memories", short clips from each day of his life, many of which feature an unknown, young blonde woman. The next day, Jake picks Yang up from Russ and takes him to Cleo, who attempts a more sophisticated repair of the core. In a flashback, Yang becomes sad about his inability to truly experience life the same way that humans do.

Jake visits locations from Yang's memories to inquire about the blonde woman; neighbor George's daughter reveals that the woman is Ada, a clone who was secretly visiting Yang while the rest of the family were at work and school. Ada then visits the house, and confirms Jake's suspicions that she and Yang had been in a relationship. Mika continues to struggle with Yang's life being in-limbo, and Jake and Kyra decide the time has come to accept his death. They donate him to a museum, and both Mika and Ada say goodbye to his body. In a flashback, Yang and Kyra discuss the improbability of an afterlife.

Jake tracks down Nancy, whom he believes to be Yang's previous and first owner. However, she explains that she bought Yang from Second Siblings as a refurbished unit, as well, before returning him five days later. Jake unlocks more of the memory bank to reveal Yang's true first life, in which he developed a relationship with another woman named Ada. This original Ada cared for the aging mother in Yang's first family, but later died in a car accident, and thus was cloned. The cloned Ada tells Jake that she had been told the person in Yang's memories was her great-aunt, but that Yang never revealed this original relationship.

Kyra and Jake agree that they don't want Yang's body to go on display at the museum, but that his memories must be preserved and shared, as his existence mattered to many people. That night, Mika tells Jake that she does not want to say goodbye to Yang. Jake agrees, and Mika begins to sing a song previously heard in one of Yang's memories.

== Cast ==
- Colin Farrell as Jake
- Jodie Turner-Smith as Kyra
- Justin H. Min as Yang
- Malea Emma Tjandrawidjaja as Mika
- Orlagh Cassidy as Lillian
- Ritchie Coster as Russ
- Sarita Choudhury as Cleo
- Clifton Collins Jr. as George
- Ava DeMary as Vicky
- Haley Lu Richardson as Ada

== Production ==
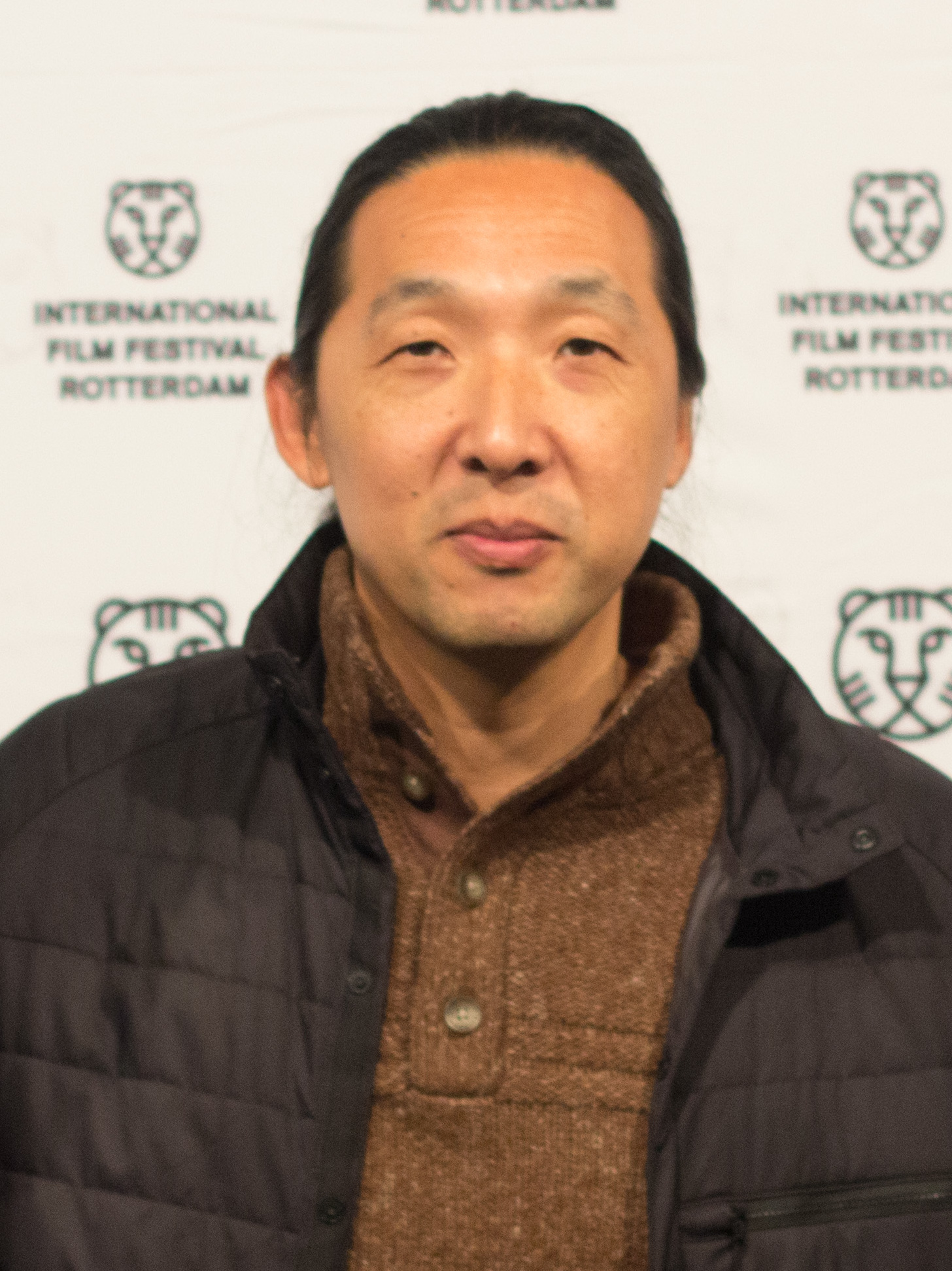
Writer, director, and editor Kogonada

In June 2018, it was reported that producer Theresa Park had acquired screen rights to Saying Goodbye to Yang, a short story written by Alexander Weinstein, which would be written and directed as a film by Kogonada. In February 2019, it was announced that Colin Farrell would star in After Yang, which would be distributed by A24. In April 2019, Golshifteh Farahani, Justin H. Min, Sarita Choudhury, and Haley Lu Richardson joined the cast. In May 2019, Jodie Turner-Smith and Clifton Collins Jr. joined the cast, with Turner-Smith replacing Farahani. Principal photography began on May 1, 2019.

== Release ==
The film had its world premiere at the Cannes Film Festival on July 8, 2021 before having its North American premiere on January 21, 2022 at the Sundance Film Festival, where it won the Alfred P. Sloan Prize. It was released simultaneously in theaters and streaming on Showtime on March 4, 2022. By 2024, it was available to stream on Amazon Prime Video.

== Reception ==
=== Box office ===
In the United States and Canada, After Yang earned an estimated $46,872 from twenty-four theaters in its opening weekend. Internationally, the film grossed $625,282 for a worldwide total of $672,154, against a production budget of $9–20 million.

=== Critical response ===
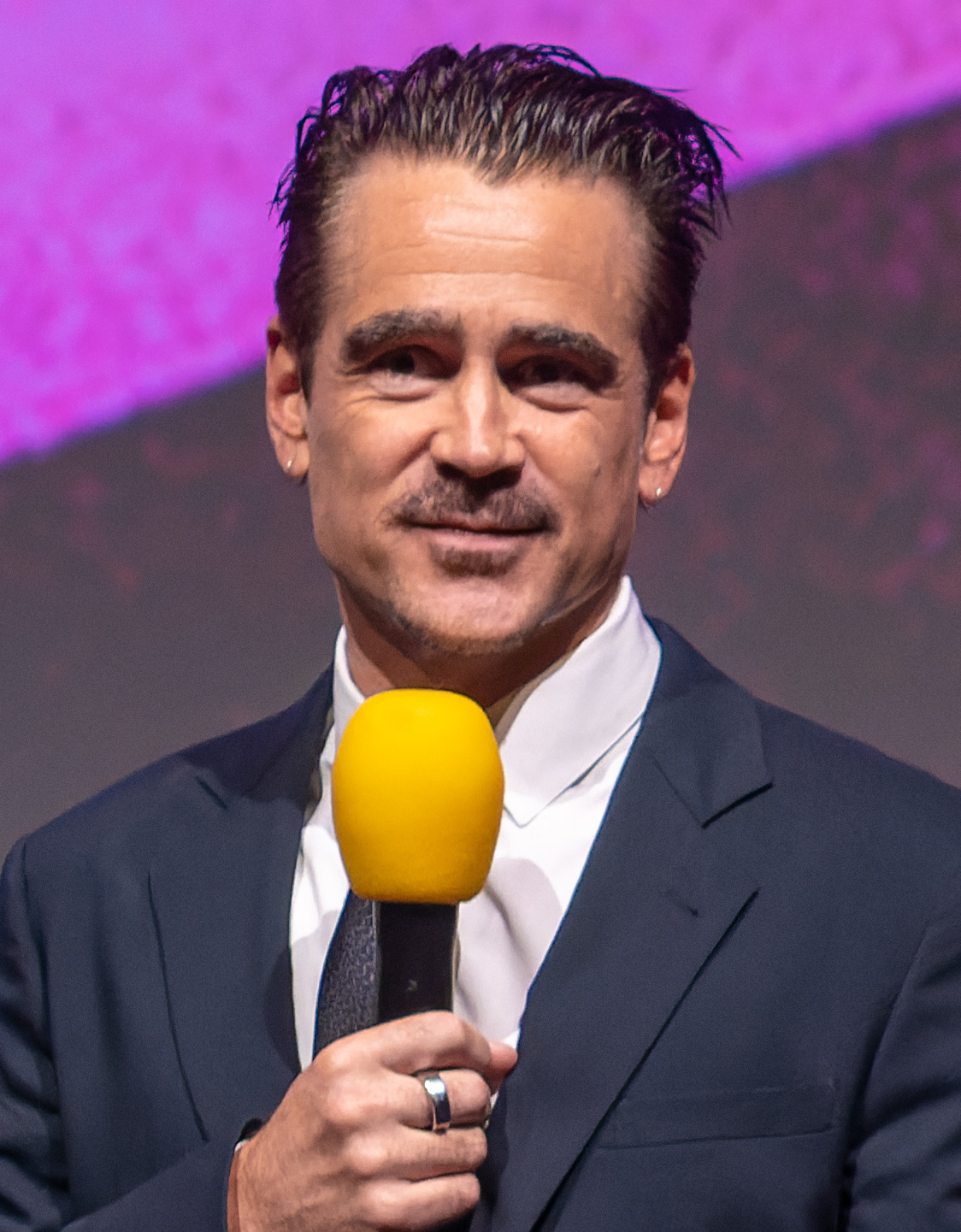
Colin Farrell was praised for his performance.

On the review aggregator website Rotten Tomatoes, 89% of 238 critics' reviews are positive, with an average rating of 7.9/10. The website's consensus reads: "Although its reach occasionally exceeds its grasp, After Yang yields rich rewards for those willing to settle into its low-key wavelength." Metacritic, which uses a weighted average, assigned the film a score of 78 out of 100, based on 44 critics, indicating "generally favorable" reviews.

Writing for The New York Times, Brandon Yu described the film as an existential crisis for humanity that asked the viewer to evaluate what it means to be alive. Polygon's Leo Kim stated the film considers many issues, including "a testament on loss, an examination of our reliance on technology, and a deeply human story about care". Richard Brody of The New Yorker wrote the characters in the film live in a "soft techno-fascism of petty pleasures and alluring surfaces that Kogonada boldly, slyly renders appealing." David Sims from The Atlantic wrote the film asked what it means to be human in a world filled with technology, and that "the result is a pensive drama that plays like a quiet mystery, seeking to understand not just its human protagonist but the deeper underpinnings of all social connections."

In 2023, IndieWire ranked it at number 9 on its list of "The 55 Best Science Fiction Films of the 21st Century," with Christian Zilko writing "While films about humans having close relationships with AI once seemed dystopian, the technology’s seeming inevitability has created a need for more empathetic art about the subject. Kogonada fills that void with a beautifully subtle touch, resulting in a film that feels just as human as the "technosapiens" in it. Collider ranked it at number 19 on its list of the "20 Best Drama Movies of the 2020s So Far," writing "While there have been countless science fiction films about the dangers of artificial intelligence (and for good reason), After Yang takes a more heartfelt approach by examining how the inclusion of a robotic child impacts a family" and that the film "feels surprisingly realistic in its depiction of having difficult conversations with loved ones." In 2024, it ranked number 105 on Rolling Stone's inaugural list of the "150 Best Science Fiction Films of All Time," with Keith Phipps writing "Kogonada offers a few suggestions of the broader near-future world in which the story takes place but keeps the focus on the emotions experienced by each family member in the wake of Yang’s seemingly permanent departure, a loss that becomes a mirror to how they view life and the meanings of endings."
