= Awkwafina =

American actress and rapper (born 1988)

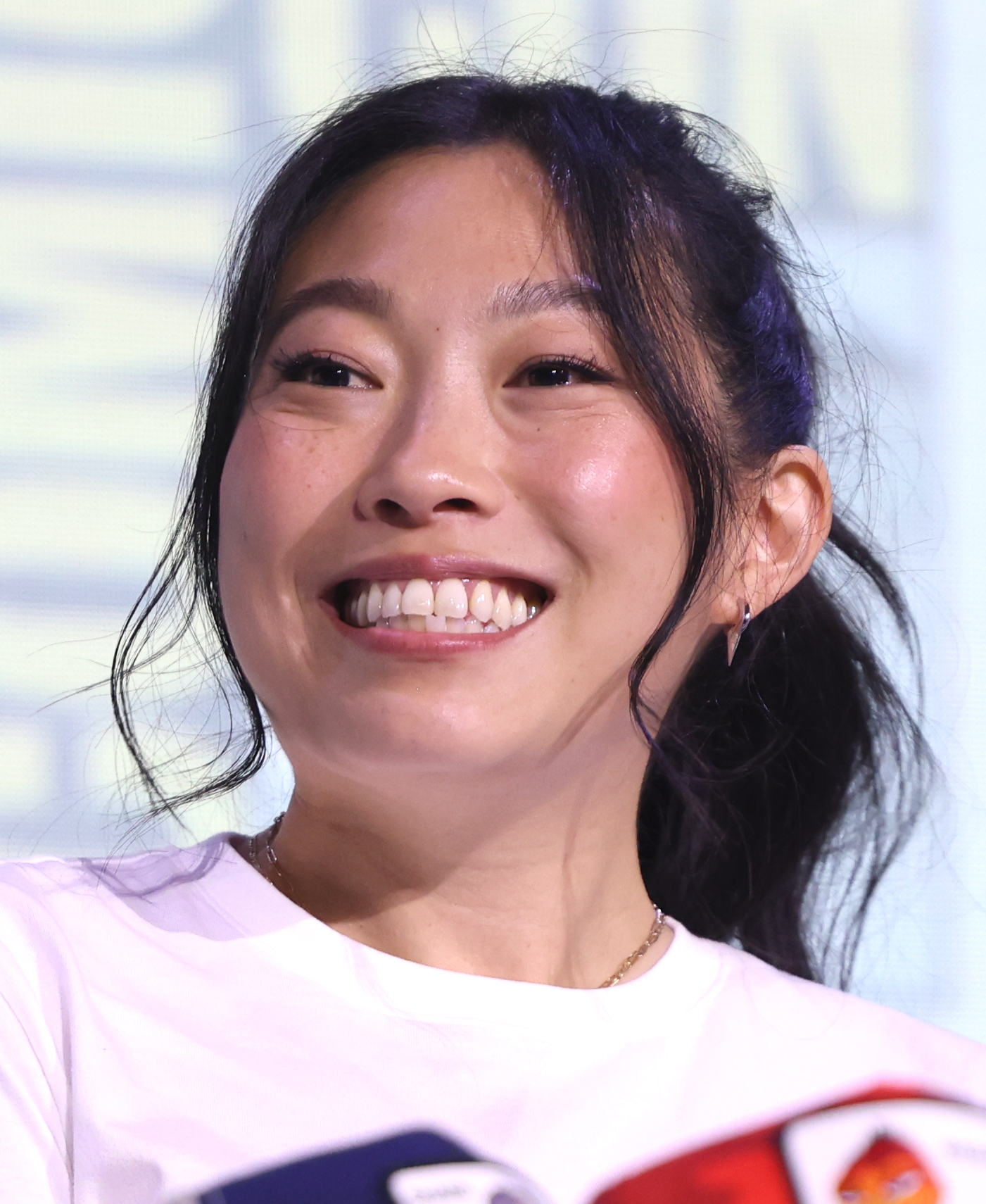
- Awkwafina at the 2025 San Diego Comic-Con
- Born: Nora Lum; June 2, 1988 (age 38); Stony Brook, New York, U.S.
- Education: University at Albany (BA)
- Occupation: Actress • rapper • comedian
- Years active: 2001–present
- Awards: Full list
- Musical career
- Origin: Queens, New York City, U.S.
- Genres: Alternative hip hop; comedy hip hop; East Coast hip hop
- Instrument: Vocals

Chinese name
- Chinese: 林家珍
Transcriptions
Standard Mandarin
- Hanyu Pinyin: Lín Jiāzhēn
Yue: Cantonese
- Jyutping: lam4 gaa1 zan1

Awkwafina
- Chinese: 奥卡菲娜
Transcriptions
Standard Mandarin
- Hanyu Pinyin: Àokǎfēinà
- Website: awkwafina.com

Nora Lum (born June 2, 1988), known professionally as Awkwafina, (Note: Pronunciation: /ˌɔːkwəˈfiːnə/, AW-kwə-FEE-nə) is an American actress, rapper, and comedian. She rose to prominence in 2012 when her rap song "My Vag" became popular on YouTube. She then released her debut album, Yellow Ranger (2014), and appeared on the MTV comedy series Girl Code (2014–2015). She expanded to films with supporting roles in the comedies Neighbors 2: Sorority Rising (2016), Ocean's 8 (2018), Crazy Rich Asians (2018), and Jumanji: The Next Level (2019). For her starring role as a grieving young woman in The Farewell (2019), she won a Golden Globe Award.

From 2020 to 2023, Awkwafina was a co-creator, writer, and executive producer of the Comedy Central series Awkwafina Is Nora from Queens, in which she played a fictionalized version of herself. In 2021, she portrayed Katy in the Marvel Cinematic Universe superhero film Shang-Chi and the Legend of the Ten Rings. She has voiced roles in Storks (2016), The Angry Birds Movie 2 (2019), Raya and the Last Dragon (2021), The Little Mermaid, Migration (both 2023), Kung Fu Panda 4, IF (both 2024), and Descendants: Wicked Wonderland (2026) as well as The Bad Guys film franchise (2022–present). She won the Primetime Emmy Award for Outstanding Television Movie for producing the TV movie Quiz Lady (2023).

== Early life and education ==
Nora Lum was born in Stony Brook, New York, the only child of Wally Lum (Chinese: 林希凡), a Chinese American, and Tia Lum (born Hong Hyun Joo), a Korean American. Her father worked in the information technology field, and her mother was a painter. Her paternal family were restaurateurs; her great-grandfather, Jimmy Lum (林华耀), immigrated to the United States in 1937 from Xinhui, Guangdong, and opened the Cantonese restaurant Lum's in Flushing, Queens, one of the neighborhood's first Chinese restaurants. Her paternal grandparents remained in China until 1965, settling in Whitestone, Queens with relatives. Her maternal family immigrated to the United States in 1972 from Gunwi County, Daegu.

Awkwafina's mother died from pulmonary hypertension in 1992 when she was four, and Awkwafina was raised by her father and paternal grandparents. Awkwafina's Chinese name was chosen by her grandfather, Lum Ye Wau (林以和), who was a research assistant at Columbia University. She became especially close to her grandmother, Powah Lum (劉寶華; 1933/34–2026), who was a nurse at Stony Brook University Hospital.

Awkwafina grew up in Forest Hills, Queens, and attended Fiorello H. LaGuardia High School, where she played the trumpet and was trained in classical music and jazz. At age 15, she adopted the stage name Awkwafina, originally a nickname coined by one of her friends, which she described as "definitely a person I repressed" and an alter ego to her "quiet and more passive" personality during her college years. Her stage name referenced the way that brands such as Neutrogena feminize themselves, and her self-perception as "awkwardly fine". She cited Charles Bukowski, Anaïs Nin, Joan Didion, Tom Waits, and Chet Baker as early influences. From 2006 to 2008, she learned Mandarin at Beijing Language and Culture University to communicate with her paternal grandmother. She majored in journalism and women's studies at the University at Albany and graduated in 2011.

== Career ==
Awkwafina began rapping at 13. She got her start producing music with GarageBand but eventually learned Logic Pro and Ableton. In 2012, her song "My Vag" became popular on YouTube. She wrote the song in college as a response to Mickey Avalon's "My Dick (Tribute to Nate)". She was fired from her job at a publishing house when her employer recognized her in the video. Her solo hip-hop album Yellow Ranger was released on February 11, 2014. Its 11 tracks include a number of her previous singles released on YouTube, including the title track "Yellow Ranger", "Queef" and "NYC Bitche$". In 2014, Awkwafina appeared in six episodes of the third and fourth seasons of Girl Code. In 2015 she co-hosted its spin-off, Girl Code Live, on MTV.

In 2016, she collaborated with comedian Margaret Cho on "Green Tea", a song that pokes fun at Asian stereotypes. She was part of the lineup at Tenacious D's Festival Supreme on October 25, 2014. She was also a disc jockey (DJ) at bars in New York. She is profiled in the 2016 documentary Bad Rap, an official selection at the 2016 Tribeca Film Festival. It puts the spotlight on her and Asian-American rappers such as Dumbfoundead, Rekstizzy and Lyricks. She released a 7-track EP, In Fina We Trust, on June 8, 2018; it won the 2019 A2IM Libera Award for Best Hip-Hop/Rap Album.

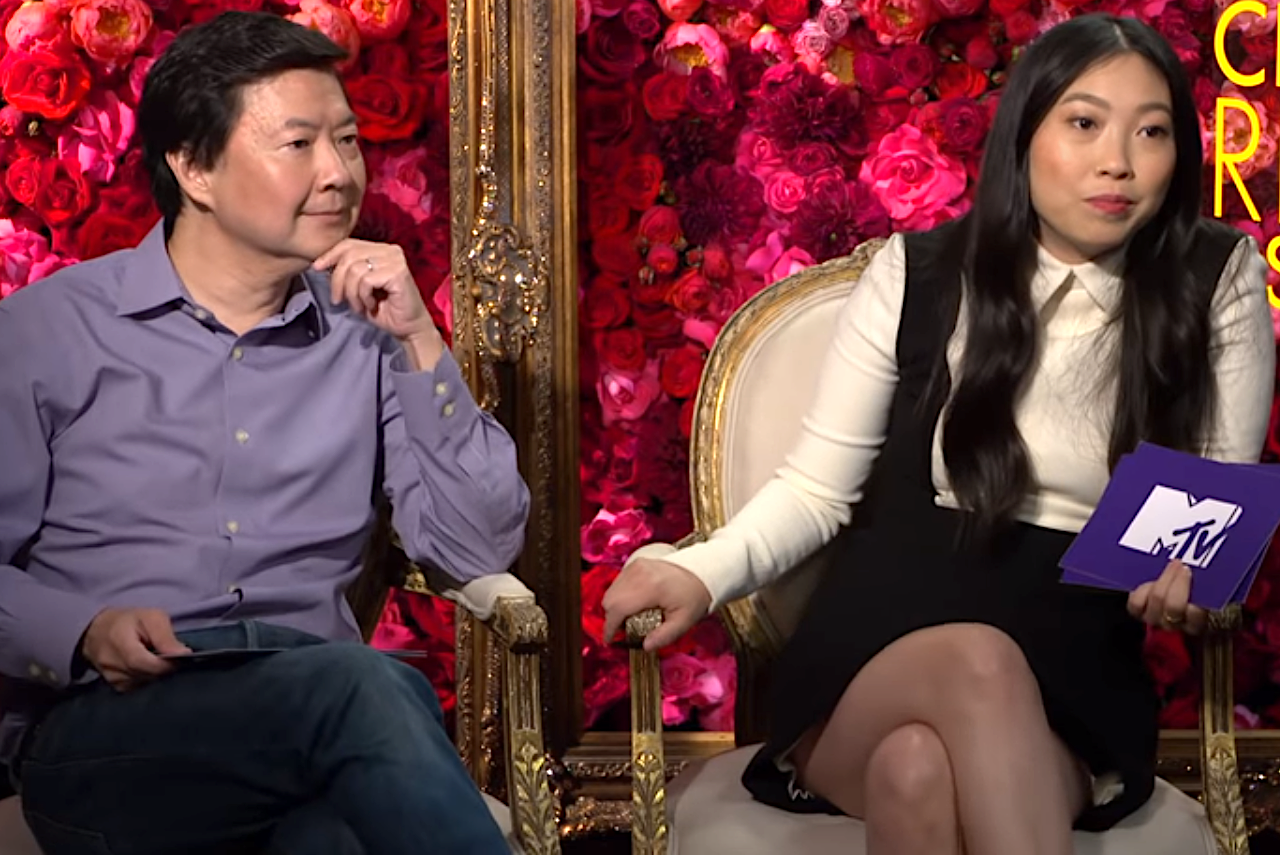
Awkwafina with Ken Jeong in 2018

Awkwafina hosted the short-form talk show web series Tawk for the digital production company Astronauts Wanted from 2015 to 2017. The first season premiered on YouTube and was picked up for exclusive streaming on Verizon's Go90 platform. It was an Official Honoree at the 2016 Webby Awards and was nominated for a 2016 Streamy Award in the News and Culture category. In 2016 she played a supporting role as Christine, a member of Kappa Nu in Neighbors 2: Sorority Rising, and voiced Quail in the animated comedy film Storks. In 2018 she starred in the indie comedy Dude, playing Rebecca, one of four best friends. She was among the principal cast in Ocean's 8, the all-female spinoff to the Ocean's Trilogy. She then co-starred in the film Crazy Rich Asians, directed by Jon M. Chu, playing Goh Peik Lin, a Singaporean college friend of lead character Rachel Chu (Constance Wu). She had a recurring role in the Hulu original series Future Man in 2017. She hosted the 2018 iHeartRadio MMVAs.

Awkwafina hosted the October 6, 2018, episode of Saturday Night Live, becoming the second East Asian-American woman to host the show (after Lucy Liu, whose episode Awkwafina cites as her inspiration to one day be famous enough to host SNL). She did an impression of Sandra Oh, who later in the season became the first East Asian-Canadian woman to host an SNL episode and the third East Asian woman to host overall.

In 2019, Awkwafina starred in the film The Farewell, directed by Lulu Wang. She played Billi, a writer who visits her ill grandmother in China. The film received critical acclaim. Awkwafina received the Golden Globe Award for Best Actress – Motion Picture Comedy or Musical, becoming the first person of Asian descent to win a Golden Globe Award in any lead actress film category, after being only the sixth woman of Asian descent to be nominated in the lead actress in a musical or comedy category. In the same year, she starred as avatar Ming Fleetfoot in the film Jumanji: The Next Level, which was a commercial success. In July 2019, Awkwafina was cast as Katy in Marvel Studios' Shang-Chi and the Legend of the Ten Rings alongside actors Simu Liu and Tony Leung Chiu-wai. Directed by Destin Daniel Cretton, the film was released in theaters on September 3, 2021, earning critical praise and grossing $430.5 million. She won the Saturn Award for Best Supporting Actress for her performance in Shang-Chi. In August 2019, Disney announced that Awkwafina would voice Sisu the dragon in the animated film Raya and the Last Dragon, which was released on March 5, 2021. Awkwafina improvised much of her dialogue for the film, drawing comparisons to Robin Williams' performance as the Genie in Aladdin.

From 2020–2023, Awkwafina starred in the comedy series Awkwafina Is Nora from Queens; she is also a writer and executive producer of that show. As part of the promotional campaign, she recorded new announcements for the 7 train of the New York City Subway, making jokes, such as "This is Hunters Point Avenue, a friendly reminder that seats are for people, not your bag" and "This is 46th Street, which is a lucky number, I just learned that on the internet. Also learned that pigeons and doves are the same things, WHAT?!", at every stop. These recordings were used until the series premiered on January 22. In a season one episode, Simu Liu made a guest appearance before the release of Shang-Chi and the Legend of the Ten Rings. In October 2023, National Geographic announced that Awkwafina narrated the documentary series A Real Bug's Life.

== Public image ==
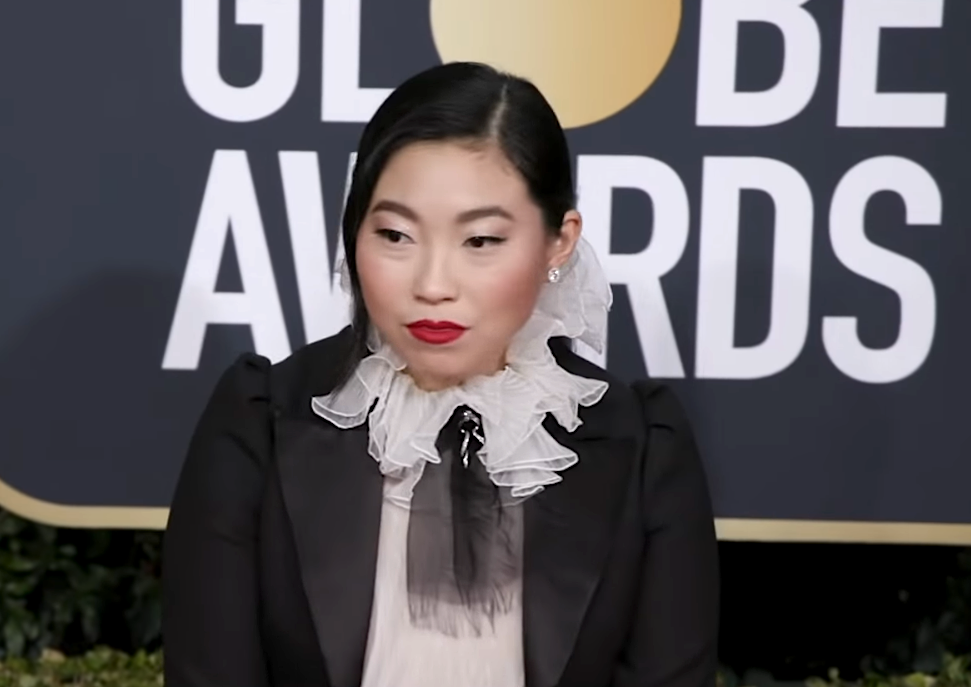
Awkwafina on the red carpet of the 77th Golden Globe Awards in 2020

Awkwafina has developed a profile as a fashion model, appearing regularly on magazine covers including Vogue, Allure, Harper's Bazaar, Cosmopolitan, Marie Claire, and feminist magazine Bust. In 2018, she was featured in Gap's "Logo Remix" campaign, which featured up-and-coming artists who "are remixing creative culture on their own terms" alongside SZA, Sabrina Claudio and Naomi Watanabe. Awkwafina was honored as Kore Asian Media's Female Breakout of the Year in 2017.

Awkwafina has expressed support for Time's Up, a movement started by Hollywood celebrities against sexual harassment. She has also advocated for more female directors and against the stereotyping of Asians in media.

Awkwafina has faced criticism for cultural appropriation of African-American Vernacular English (AAVE), including her use of a "blaccent", and mannerisms stereotypic of the African-American community. In 2018, she said, "I welcome that conversation because as an Asian-American identity, we're still trying to figure out what that is." On February 5, 2022, Awkwafina tweeted, "My immigrant background allowed me to carve an American identity [...] as a non-black POC, I stand by the fact that I will always listen and work tirelessly to understand the history and context of AAVE". Certain activists criticized this response as being several years late and unapologetic. Conversely, Vulture writer Lauren Michele Jackson wrote that Awkwafina does not "conjure blackness any more than Ed Sheeran's bars", adding that, "In conversations around Awkwafina's blaccent, the actress's regional and musical background has been used to both defend and attack her".

== Other ventures ==
Before launching her entertainment career, she worked as an intern at the Gotham Gazette in New York City; as an intern at the Times Union newspaper in Albany, New York; and as a publicity assistant for publishing house Rodale Books, which fired her after they discovered her music videos. She later worked at a vegan bodega. In 2015, she released a New York City guidebook, Awkwafina's NYC. On May 16, 2019, she headlined The Infatuation's annual food festival, EEEEEATSCON, where she spoke about her upbringing in Queens, and her family's Cantonese restaurant.

== Filmography ==
Key
| † | Denotes films that have not yet been released |

=== Film ===
| Year | Title | Role | Notes |
|---|---|---|---|
| 2016 | Bad Rap | Herself | Documentary |
| 2016 | Neighbors 2: Sorority Rising | Christine | |
| 2016 | Storks | Quail | Voice cameo role |
| 2018 | Dude | Rebecca | |
| 2018 | Ocean's 8 | Constance | |
| 2018 | Crazy Rich Asians | Goh Peik Lin | |
| 2019 | The Farewell | Billi Wang | |
| 2019 | Paradise Hills | Yu | |
| 2019 | The Angry Birds Movie 2 | Courtney | Voice role |
| 2019 | Between Two Ferns: The Movie | Herself | |
| 2019 | Jumanji: The Next Level | Ming Fleetfoot | |
| 2020 | The SpongeBob Movie: Sponge on the Run | Otto | Voice role |
| 2021 | Breaking News in Yuba County | Mina | |
| 2021 | Raya and the Last Dragon | Sisu | Voice role |
| 2021 | Shang-Chi and the Legend of the Ten Rings | Katy | |
| 2021 | Swan Song | Kate | |
| 2022 | The Bad Guys | Ms. Tarantula | Voice role |
| 2022 | The Bad Guys in Maraschino Ruby | Ms. Tarantula | Voice role; short film |
| 2023 | Renfield | Rebecca Quincy | |
| 2023 | The Little Mermaid | Scuttle | Voice role |
| 2023 | Once Upon a Studio | Sisu | Voice role; short film; archival recordings |
| 2023 | Quiz Lady | Anne | |
| 2023 | Migration | Chump | Voice role |
| 2024 | Migration: Fly Hard | Chump | Voice role; short film |
| 2024 | Kung Fu Panda 4 | Zhen | Voice role |
| 2024 | Kung Fu Panda: Dueling Dumplings | Zhen | Voice role; short film |
| 2024 | IF | Bubble IF | Voice role |
| 2024 | Jackpot! | Katie | |
| 2025 | The Bad Guys in Little Lies and Alibis | Ms. Tarantula | Voice role; short film |
| 2025 | The Bad Guys 2 | Ms. Tarantula | Voice role |
| 2026 | Descendants: Wicked Wonderland | Chessy Cheshire | Voice role |
| 2026 | Wildwood | Septima | Voice role |
| 2026 | The Man with the Bag † | Nadia Nyce | Post-production |
| 2026 | Jumanji: Open World † | Ming Fleetfoot | Post-production |
| TBA | Kaet Might Die † | Kaet | Main role Executive Producer |
| TBA | Thumb † | TBA | Post-production |

Key
| † | Denotes television productions that have not yet been released |

=== Television ===
| Year | Title | Role | Notes |
|---|---|---|---|
| 2014–15 | Girl Code | Herself | 6 episodes |
| 2015 | Girl Code Live | Herself (co-host) | 10 episodes |
| 2015 | Regular Show | Apple (voice) | Episode: "Hello China" |
| 2015–17 | Tawk | Herself (host) | 36 episodes |
| 2016 | Mary + Jane | Gina | Episode: "Noachella" |
| 2017 | Future Man | Woman at Video Game Store | 3 episodes |
| 2018 | Animals. | Annie (voice) | Episode: "Roachella" |
| 2018 | Saturday Night Live | Herself (host) | Episode: "Awkwafina/Travis Scott" |
| 2019 | Weird City | Charlotta | Episode: "Below" |
| 2019 | The Simpsons | Carmen (voice); Dr. Chang (voice) | Episode: "Bart vs. Itchy & Scratchy"; Episode: "D'oh Canada" |
| 2019 | Tuca & Bertie | Bertie's Left Boob (voice) | Episode: "The Promotion" |
| 2019 | The Dark Crystal: Age of Resistance | skekLach the Collector (voice) | 7 episodes |
| 2020–23 | Awkwafina Is Nora from Queens | Nora Lin | 27 episodes Also co-creator, writer and executive producer |
| 2020 | One World: Together at Home | Herself | Television special |
| 2022 | The Boys Presents: Diabolical | Sky / Areola / Turd (voice) | Episode: "BFFS"; Also writer |
| 2024–25 | A Real Bug's Life | Narrator | Documentary series |
| 2025 | No Taste Like Home with Antoni Porowski | Herself | Episode: "Awkwafina and her Korean Heritage" |
| 2025 | Black Mirror | Kimmy | Episode: "Hotel Reverie" |
| 2025 | Poker Face | Maddie Saint Marie | Episode: "A New Lease on Death" |
| 2025 | Marvel Zombies | Katy (voice) | 3 episodes |
| 2026 | Awkwafina: The Unlikely Cook | Herself | Apple TV travel series |

=== Web ===
| Year | Title | Role | Notes |
|---|---|---|---|
| 2021 | Discord: The Movie | Herself | With Danny DeVito |

=== Miscellaneous work ===
| Year | Title | Role | Notes |
|---|---|---|---|
| 2026 | Rock 'n' Roller Coaster Starring The Muppets | Herself | Cameo; Disney's Hollywood Studios attraction |

== Discography ==
Studio albums
| Title | Details |
|---|---|
| Yellow Ranger | Released: February 11, 2014; Label: self-released; Format: Digital download |
| In Fina We Trust | Released: June 8, 2018; Label: self-released; Format: Digital download |

Studio singles
| Title | Year | Album |
|---|---|---|
| "My Vag" | 2012 | Non-album single |
| "NYC Bitche$" | 2013 | Yellow Ranger |
| "Mayor Bloomberg (Giant Margaritas)" | 2013 | Yellow Ranger |
| "Queef" | 2013 | Yellow Ranger |
| "Daydreamin'" | 2014 | Non-album single |
| "Come Stop Me" (featuring Dumbfoundead) | 2014 | Non-album single |
| "Yellow Alert" (featuring Dumbfoundead) | 2016 | Non-album single |
| "Green Tea" (featuring Margaret Cho) | 2016 | Non-album single |
| "Pockiez" | 2018 | In Fina We Trust |

== Awards, nominations and recognitions ==
Awkwafina was honored as Kore Asian Media's Female Breakout of the Year in 2017. For her performance in the comedy-drama film The Farewell, she received the Golden Globe Award for Best Actress – Motion Picture Comedy or Musical, the Satellite Award for Best Actress – Motion Picture Musical or Comedy, and the Santa Barbara International Film Festival Virtuoso Award, among numerous other nominations. Alongside the film's ensemble, she was nominated for the Screen Actors Guild Award for Outstanding Performance by a Cast in a Motion Picture. Awkwafina also received a nomination for the BAFTA Rising Star Award.

For starring and producing in the 2023 TV Movie Quiz Lady she won the Primetime Emmy Award for Outstanding Television Movie.

== See also ==
- Asian Americans in arts and entertainment
- Chinese people in New York City
- Koreans in New York City
