= Yellow Ranger (album) =

Album by Awkwafina

Studio album by Awkwafina
- Released: February 11, 2014
- Genre: Hip hop
- Length: 31:18
- Labels: Yellow Ranger, EMPIRE

Awkwafina chronology
Yellow Ranger (2014)	In Fina We Trust (2018)

Yellow Ranger is the debut album of American actress and rapper Awkwafina, released February 11, 2014. The title is a reference to the fictional character Trini Kwan of Mighty Morphin Power Rangers, who (like Awkwafina) is an East Asian American woman. The album was touted as a feminist tract and included previously released songs, such as "NYC Bitche$", "Queef" and "Yellow Ranger". The album was written and co-produced by Awkwafina. She recorded the original version of "My Vag" solely on GarageBand. The track "Mayor Bloomberg (Giant Margarita)" was inspired by the New York soda ban.

== Track listing ==
1. "Intro III" – 4:46
2. "Yellow Ranger" – 1:30
3. "Queef" – 3:14
4. "NYC Bitche$" – 3:10
5. "Janet Reno Mad" – 3:39
6. "Mayor Bloomberg (Giant Margarita)" – 2:46
7. "Fresh Water Salmon" – 2:52
8. "Marijuana" – 2:05
9. "Flu Shot" – 2:03
10. "Come Stop Me" (featuring Dumbfoundead) – 2:13
11. "My Vag" (Vag Redux Edition) – 3:00
