= Posthumous (2014 film) =

2014 American romantic comedy

- Film poster
- Directed by: Lulu Wang
- Written by: Lulu Wang
- Produced by: Bernadette Bürgi
- Starring: Brit Marling; Jack Huston
- Cinematography: Stefan Ciupek
- Edited by: Matthew Friedman; Antje Zynga
- Music by: Brian Crosby; Dustin O'Halloran
- Distributed by: The Orchard
- Release date: October 4, 2014 (Zurich)
- Running time: 94 minutes
- Countries: United States; Germany
- Language: English

Posthumous is a 2014 American-German film directed by Lulu Wang and starring Brit Marling and Jack Huston. It is Wang's directorial debut.

== Plot ==
Frustrated with his lack of success, artist Liam Price (Jack Huston) destroys his work in front of a Berlin gallery. However, when he passes out drunk, a homeless man steals his belongings. The man is found dead with Liam's drawings and everyone believes that he is Liam and has killed himself. When Liam realizes his art is worth more after his death, he devises an elaborate plan to make money off of his supposed demise. Meanwhile, an American journalist (Brit Marling) decides to write a story on Liam's life, which puts his ruse in jeopardy.

== Cast ==
- Brit Marling as McKenzie Grain
- Jack Huston as Liam Price
- Lambert Wilson as Daniel S. Volpe
- Alexander Fehling as Erik Adler
- Tom Schilling as Ben
- Nikolai Kinski as Kaleb Moo
- Isabelle Redfern as Randy
- Martin Stange as Detective
- Fabian Stumm as Curator 1
- Harald Siebler as Arman Rubell
- Julie Trappett as Shannon
- Pamela Knaack as Camille Seekamp

== See also ==
- List of American films of 2014
