= Houston Film Critics Society Award for Best Supporting Actress =

Annual US film award

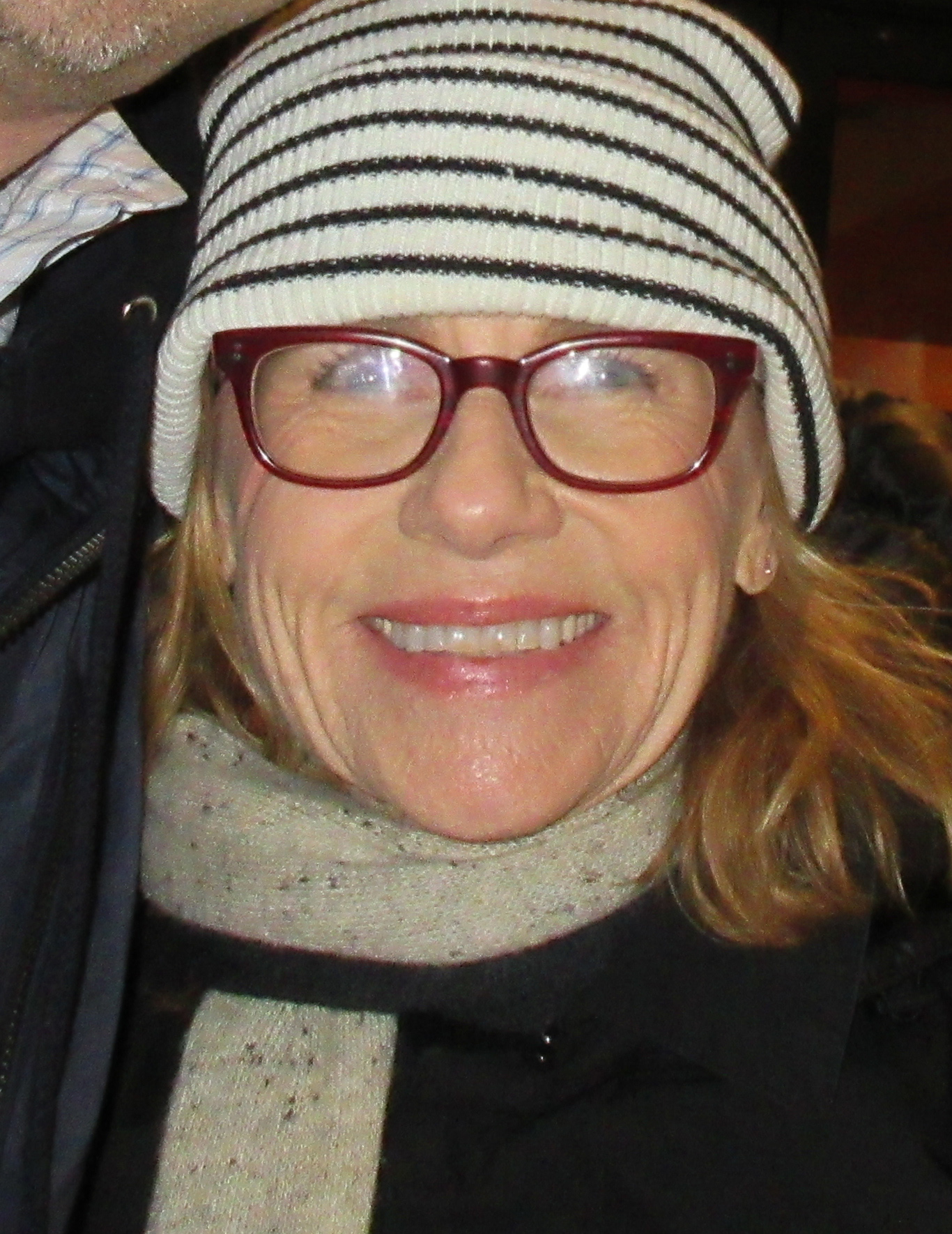
- The 2025 recipient: Amy Madigan
- Awarded for: Best Performance by an Actress in a Supporting Role
- Country: United States
- Presented by: Houston Film Critics Society
- First award: Amy Ryan; Gone Baby Gone (2007)
- Currently held by: Amy Madigan; Weapons (2025)
- Website: houstonfilmcritics.org

The Houston Film Critics Society Award for Best Supporting Actress is an annual award given by the Houston Film Critics Society. It is given in honor of an actress who has delivered an outstanding performance in a supporting role.

== Winners ==
- † = Winner of the Academy Award for Best Supporting Actress
- ‡ = Nominated of the Academy Award for Best Supporting Actress

=== 2000s ===
Year	Winner and nominees	Film	Role
2007	Amy Ryan ‡	Gone Baby Gone	Helene McCready
2007	Cate Blanchett ‡	I'm Not There	Jude Quinn
2007	Catherine Keener	Into the Wild	Jan Burres
2007	Kelly Macdonald	No Country for Old Men	Carla Jean Moss
2007	Tilda Swinton †	Michael Clayton	Karen Crowder
2008	Viola Davis ‡	Doubt	Mrs. Miller
2008	Amy Adams ‡	Doubt	Sister James
2008	Penélope Cruz †	Vicky Cristina Barcelona	María Elena
2008	Taraji P. Henson ‡	The Curious Case of Benjamin Button	Queenie
2008	Marisa Tomei ‡	The Wrestler	Pam / Cassidy
2009	Anna Kendrick ‡	Up in the Air	Natalie Keener
2009	Penélope Cruz ‡	Nine	Carla Albanese
2009	Vera Farmiga ‡	Up in the Air	Alex Goran
2009	Mo'Nique †	Precious	Mary Lee Johnston
2009	Samantha Morton	The Messenger	Olivia Pitterson

=== 2010s ===
Year	Winner and nominees	Film	Role
2010	Hailee Steinfeld ‡	True Grit	Mattie Ross
2010	Helena Bonham Carter ‡	The King's Speech	Queen Elizabeth The Queen Mother
2010	Melissa Leo †	The Fighter	Alice Eklund-Ward
2010	Julianne Moore	The Kids Are All Right	Jules Allgood
2010	Jacki Weaver ‡	Animal Kingdom	Janine "Smurf" Cody
2011	Shailene Woodley	The Descendants	Alex King
2011	Jessica Chastain ‡	The Help	Celia Rae Foote
2011	Melissa McCarthy ‡	Bridesmaids	Megan Price
2011	Janet McTeer ‡	Albert Nobbs	Hubert Page
2011	Octavia Spencer †	The Help	Minny Jackson
2012	Anne Hathaway †	Les Misérables	Fantine
2012	Amy Adams ‡	The Master	Peggy Dodd
2012	Judi Dench	Skyfall	M
2012	Sally Field ‡	Lincoln	Mary Todd Lincoln
2012	Helen Hunt ‡	The Sessions	Cheryl Cohen-Greene
2013	Lupita Nyong'o †	12 Years a Slave	Patsey
2013	Jennifer Lawrence ‡	American Hustle	Rosalyn Rosenfeld
2013	Octavia Spencer	Fruitvale Station	Wanda Johnson
2013	June Squibb ‡	Nebraska	Kate Grant
2013	Oprah Winfrey	The Butler	Gloria Gaines
2014	Patricia Arquette †	Boyhood	Olivia Evans
2014	Jessica Chastain	A Most Violent Year	Anna Morales
2014	Keira Knightley ‡	The Imitation Game	Joan Clarke
2014	Emma Stone ‡	Birdman	Sam Thomson
2014	Tilda Swinton	Snowpiercer	Minister Mason
2015	Rooney Mara ‡	Carol	Therese Belivet
2015	Jennifer Jason Leigh ‡	The Hateful Eight	Daisy Domergue
2015	Alicia Vikander †	The Danish Girl	Gerda Wegener
2015	Alicia Vikander	Ex Machina	Ava
2015	Kate Winslet ‡	Steve Jobs	Joanna Hoffman
2016	Viola Davis †	Fences	Rose Maxson
2016	Greta Gerwig	20th Century Women	Abigail "Abbie" Porter
2016	Naomie Harris ‡	Moonlight	Paula
2016	Octavia Spencer ‡	Hidden Figures	Dorothy Vaughan
2016	Michelle Williams ‡	Manchester by the Sea	Randi
2017	Allison Janney †	I, Tonya	LaVona Golden
2017	Holly Hunter	The Big Sick	Beth Gardner
2017	Dafne Keen	Logan	Laura Kinney / X-23
2017	Laurie Metcalf ‡	Lady Bird	Marion McPherson
2017	Octavia Spencer ‡	The Shape of Water	Zelda Fuller
2018	Rachel Weisz ‡	The Favourite	Sarah Churchill
2018	Amy Adams ‡	Vice	Lynne Cheney
2018	Claire Foy	First Man	Janet Armstrong
2018	Regina King †	If Beale Street Could Talk	Sharon Rivers
2018	Emma Stone ‡	The Favourite	Abigail Hill
2019	Zhao Shu-zhen	The Farewell	Nai Nai
2019	Kathy Bates ‡	Richard Jewell	Barbara "Bobi" Jewell
2019	Laura Dern †	Marriage Story	Nora Fanshaw
2019	Scarlett Johansson ‡	Jojo Rabbit	Rosie Betzler
2019	Florence Pugh ‡	Little Women	Amy March
2019	Margot Robbie ‡	Bombshell	Kayla Pospisil

=== 2020s ===
Year	Winner and nominees	Film	Role
2020	Maria Bakalova ‡	Borat Subsequent Moviefilm	Tutar Sagdiyev
2020	Ellen Burstyn	Pieces of a Woman	Elizabeth
2020	Olivia Colman ‡	The Father	Anne
2020	Amanda Seyfried ‡	Mank	Marion Davies
2020	Youn Yuh-jung †	Minari	Soon-ja
2021	Ann Dowd	Mass	Linda
2021	Jessie Buckley ‡	The Lost Daughter	Young Leda Caruso
2021	Ariana DeBose †	West Side Story	Anita
2021	Kirsten Dunst ‡	The Power of the Dog	Rose Gordon
2021	Aunjanue Ellis ‡	King Richard	Oracene "Brandy" Price
2022	Kerry Condon ‡	The Banshees of Inisherin	Siobhán Súilleabháin
2022	Jessie Buckley	Women Talking	Mariche
2022	Jamie Lee Curtis †	Everything Everywhere All at Once	Deirdre Beaubeirdre
2022	Stephanie Hsu ‡	Everything Everywhere All at Once	Joy Wang / Jobu Tupaki
2022	Janelle Monáe	Glass Onion: A Knives Out Mystery	Cassandra "Andi" Brand and Helen Brand
2023	Da'Vine Joy Randolph ‡	The Holdovers	Mary Lamb
2023	Emily Blunt ‡	Oppenheimer	Katherine "Kitty" Oppenheimer
2023	Danielle Brooks ‡	The Color Purple	Sofia
2023	Rachel McAdams	Are You There God? It's Me, Margaret.	Barbara Simon
2023	Rosamund Pike	Saltburn	Elspbeth Catton
2024	Zoe Saldaña †	Emilia Pérez	Rita Mora Castro
2024	Ariana Grande ‡	Wicked	Galinda Upland
2024	Felicity Jones ‡	The Brutalist	Erzsébet Tóth
2024	Isabella Rossellini ‡	Conclave	Sister Agnes
2024	Margaret Qualley	The Substance	Sue
2025	Amy Madigan	Weapons	Gladys
2025	Ariana Grande	Wicked: For Good	Galinda Upland
2025	Inga Ibsdotter Lilleaas	Sentimental Value	Agnes Borg Pettersen
2025	Wunmi Mosaku	Sinners	Annie
2025	Teyana Taylor	One Battle After Another	Perfidia Beverly Hills

== Multiple Winners ==
=== 2 Wins ===
- Viola Davis (2008, 2016)
