= Alexander Weinstein (author) =

American short story writer

- Education: MFA in Creative Writing-Fiction
- Alma mater: Indiana University Bloomington
- Occupation: Author
- Writing career
- Language: English
- Notable work: Children of the New World
- Website: www.alexanderweinstein.com

Alexander Weinstein is an American short story writer and filmmaker. He is the founder and director of The Martha's Vineyard Institute of Creative Writing. He is best known for his 2016 collection Children of the New World, which was chosen by The New York Times as one of the 100 Notable Books of 2016.

== Early life and education ==
Weinstein was born in Brooklyn, New York, New York. He graduated from Naropa University, earning a bachelor's in arts. He then went on to Indiana University Bloomington, earning dual masters in English and Creative Writing-Fiction in 2008.

== Short stories ==
- "The Apocalypse Tales", Notre Dame Review
- "The Cartographers", Chattahoochee Review
- "Children of the New World", Pleiades
- "Excerpts from the World Authorized Dictionary", Cream City Review
- "The Final Days of Father Troll", Western Humanities Review
- "Heartland", Pleiades
- "The Great Flood", Permafrost
- "Ice Age", Natural Bridge
- "Impossible Shapes", Sou’Wester
- "Migration", PRISM International
- "Rocket Night", Southern Indiana Review
- "Shared Love", Midwestern Gothic

Collections

- Children of the New World: Stories, Picador
- Universal Love: Stories, Picador

== Non-fiction ==
- "Towards a Moral Fiction", Pleiades
- "Reincarnations of Space-Men", Lalitamba
