= Lauren Michele Jackson =

American culture critic (born 1991)

- Occupations: Culture critic, scholar, writer
- Known for: White Negroes (2019)
- Title: Assistant professor

Academic background
- Education: University of Illinois at Urbana–Champaign (BA); University of Chicago (PhD)
- Thesis: Black Vertigo: Nausea, Aphasia, and Bodily Noise, 1970s to the present (2019)

Academic work
- Discipline: English, African-American studies
- Institutions: Northwestern University

Lauren Michele Jackson (born 1991) is an American culture critic and assistant professor of English and African American studies at Northwestern University. Her first book, White Negroes (2019), is a nonfiction collection of essays that explores cultural appropriation.

== Career ==
Jackson attended University of Illinois at Urbana-Champaign for her bachelor's degree. She received her doctoral degree in English Language and Literature from University of Chicago. Her dissertation is titled "Black Vertigo: Nausea, Aphasia, and Bodily Noise, 1970s to the present." In 2019, Jackson was hired at Northwestern University as an assistant professor in the departments of English and African American studies.

Jackson began freelance writing when she was a doctoral student. She has written for Vulture, The Paris Review, and The New Yorker, among others.

Jackson's debut book, White Negroes: Cornrows Were in Vogue... and Other Thoughts on Cultural Appropriation "explores how appropriation manifests in music, art, memes, and more." It was published by Beacon Press in November 2019. The title was inspired by the 1957 Norman Mailer essay "The White Negro". Reviewing the book for Vox, Alanna Okun wrote, "Using case studies ranging from the Kardashians to Miley Cyrus to Paula Deen to Big Dick Energy, she explores and pinpoints the term with nuance, curiosity, and wryness."

She was named a contributing writer for The New Yorker in September 2020.

== Bibliography ==
- Jackson, Lauren Michele (2019). White Negroes: When Cornrows Were in Vogue… and Other Thoughts on Cultural Appropriation. Beacon Press. ISBN 978-0-8070-1180-5.
- Jackson, Lauren Michele (2026). Back: Essays on the Soul and Spine of America. Amistad. ISBN 978-0-06-304390-9.
