= Lulu Wang (filmmaker) =

American filmmaker

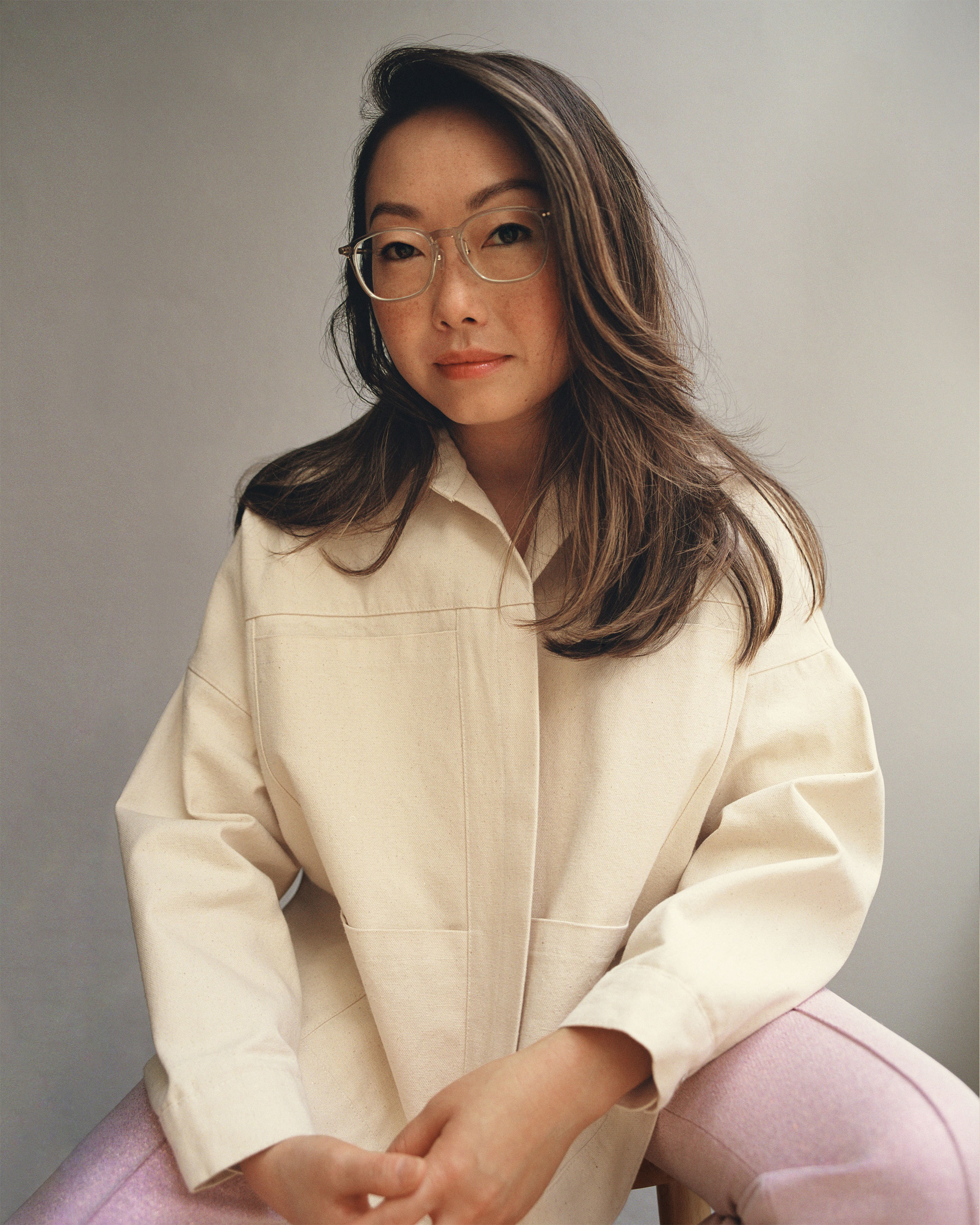
- Wang in 2024
- Born: February 25, 1983 (age 43); Beijing, China
- Education: New World School of the Arts
- Alma mater: Boston College
- Occupations: Film director; screenwriter; producer
- Years active: 2005–present
- Spouse: Barry Jenkins (m. 2024)
- Children: 1

Lulu Wang (Chinese: 王子逸; pinyin: Wáng Zǐyì; born February 25, 1983) is a Chinese-born American filmmaker. She is best known for writing and directing the comedy-drama films Posthumous (2014) and The Farewell (2019). For the latter, she received the Independent Spirit Award for Best Film and the film was named one of the top ten films of 2019 by the American Film Institute. Wang has also written, produced, and directed several short films, documentaries, and music videos.

== Early life and education ==
Wang was born in Beijing. Her father Haiyan Wang was a Chinese diplomat to the USSR and her mother Jian Yu is a former cultural critic and editor at the Beijing Literary Gazette. She has a younger brother, Anthony. Wang spent her early years in Beijing with her parents and briefly lived with her paternal grandmother for a year in Changchun, Jilin, before emigrating to Miami at age 6 because her father was pursuing a PhD at the University of Miami.

She is a classically trained pianist, starting lessons at age four and attending the New World School of the Arts. Her parents encouraged her to become a professional pianist; her mother took her to a local church in Miami every day to practice before they were able to buy a piano for her. Wang ultimately decided against a career in music when she was at college.

Wang studied music and literature at Boston College from 2001 and graduated in 2005 with a double major in literature and music. Wang says she was inspired to become a filmmaker after watching Steven Shainberg's 2002 film Secretary in her senior year. She then took two film production courses and made several short films while still at college. After learning the art of film and producing a few short student films and documentaries, Wang moved to Hollywood in 2007 to fully pursue her love for writing.

== Career ==
=== 2005–2007: Beginnings ===
Filmmaking found itself early in Wang's career, but instead of movie theaters her content was exhibited in courtrooms. Shown for mediation and court cases, she created short “day in the life” videos for legal firms for her startup business, capturing injured victims’ daily struggles in mundane activities. She interviewed many clients and their families in an attempt to show the extent of their injuries.

In 2005, while still a student, Wang received the Best Beginning Film Award at the Boston College Baldwin Awards for Storyteller, which she made together with fellow Boston College student Tony Hale. They went on to win the Baldwin Award for Best Picture for the short film Pisces at the Boston College Baldwin Film Festival the following year. Wang and Hale also collaborated on the 2006 documentary short, Fishing the Gulf, on over-fishing in Panama. Her next project was the 2007 short film Can-Can, based on a short story by Arturo Vivante about marriage and infidelity.

=== 2008–2015: Posthumous and breakthrough ===
In 2008, shortly after moving to Los Angeles, Wang interned for a producer alongside Bernadette Bürgi. After a trip to IKEA, the two decided to make a film together due to their mutual affection for storytelling and romantic comedies. Wang and Bürgi set up their own production company Flying Box Productions; Wang directed multiple web shorts and music videos and, in 2014, her first feature film, Posthumous. Set in Berlin, Germany, Posthumous is an American-German co-production starring Brit Marling and Jack Huston. Wang was so dedicated to having Huston in the film, she wrote a heartfelt letter to him, which he later admitted was the reason he signed on to the first-time writer/director's project. The film debuted at the Zurich Film Festival on 4 October 2014, played in the U.S. at the Miami International Film Festival, and has been released worldwide.

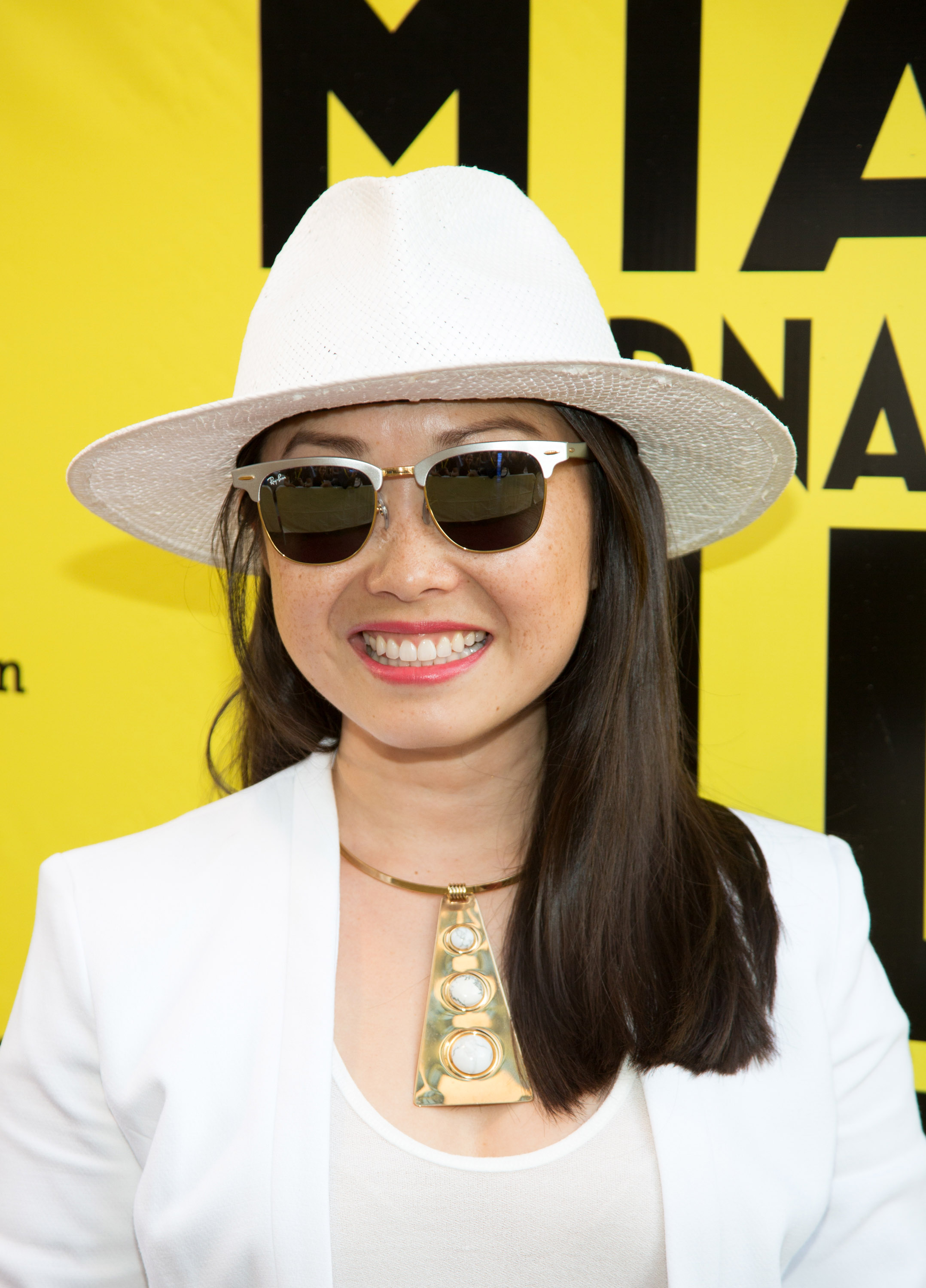
Wang at the Miami International Film Festival in 2015

In 2014, Wang was awarded the Chaz and Roger Ebert Directing Fellowship at the Film Independent Spirit Awards. The same year, she was chosen as a Film Independent Project Involve Directing Fellow. Wang's 2015 short film Touch premiered at the Palm Springs International ShortFest. Touch was an NBCU Short Film Festival finalist, was selected by the American Cinematheque for its Annual Focus on Female Directors, and won Best Drama at the Asians on Film Festival.

=== 2016–present: The Farewell and acclaim ===
In May 2016, Wang wrote and narrated a story, "What You Don't Know", for the radio program This American Life. Later that year, development began on a feature film based on the story with producer Chris Weitz, who had heard it on the radio. In 2017, Wang was chosen to participate in Sundance Institute’s FilmTwo Initiative, which provides guidance for filmmakers creating their second feature films.

In January 2019, Wang's second feature film, The Farewell, premiered at the Sundance Film Festival, where it was picked up for worldwide distribution by A24. The film follows struggling New York City artist Billi (played by Awkwafina in her first dramatic role), who travels to China for a family reunion to visit her dying grandmother. The family has decided to keep the truth about her condition a secret from Nai Nai (Mandarin for "grandmother") and sets up a wedding as a pretense for their reunion. Wang based the film on her own grandmother's illness, which also included her family setting up a wedding as a pretense; the film opens with a title card stating Based on an actual lie. The film is presented for the most part in Mandarin Chinese with English subtitles. It was filmed in the neighborhood where Wang's grandmother lived and Wang cast her actual great aunt Lu Hong to play herself in the film. After its Sundance premiere, numerous publications listed The Farewell as a standout at the festival, including Variety, Thrillist, and Rolling Stone. Despite being an award winning film now, Lulu Wang struggled with American financiers when pitching the movie The Farewell. It was suggested to Wang that she added a prominent white character into her movie and to switch the genre of the movie from drama to comedy. Even when pitching the movie to a Chinese financier, incorporating a white character was suggested. “People are so influenced by Hollywood” Wang says and she strived to break out that box by refusing to “whitewash” the film.

In an IndieWire critics survey published after the festival, The Farewell was voted Best Film and Best Screenplay and Wang was voted Best Director. The film holds a 99% Critics Consensus rating on Rotten Tomatoes, based on 207 reviews.

In January 2019, Variety named Wang one of ten "Directors to Watch." In an interview with the publication, she described her next project as "very grounded science fiction."

The Farewell opened in limited release in four US theaters on July 12, 2019. The film opened to a gross of $351,330, averaging $87,833 per theater, surpassing the average of Avengers: Endgame which averaged $76,601 in 4,662 theaters for a gross of $357,115,007 on its opening weekend. The Farewell was released nationwide in the US on August 2, 2019.

The film attracted less interest in China, however, leading Variety to label it a box office "flop" in China, then the world's second-largest film market.

On December 4, 2019, the American Film Institute announced that The Farewell was one of that year's ten recipients of the 2019 AFI Awards for "films that are culturally and artistically representative" of 2019's "most significant achievements in the art of the moving image."

For her role as Billi, Awkwafina was awarded the Golden Globe Award for Best Actress in a Motion Picture – Musical or Comedy on January 5, 2020. The Farewell won the Independent Spirit Award for Best Feature at the 35th Independent Spirit Awards in Santa Monica, California on February 8, 2020. When awarded for her movie The Farewell, Wang dedicated her speech to talk about the lack of female director nominees. Wang states programs and encouragement are not "enough" and that the filmmaking industry needs to give women more jobs. Lulu Wang further emphasized the importance of making the same bets on female filmmakers as they do with male filmmakers.

On January 28, 2021 Apple released an 11-minute short film called Nian written and directed by Wang, celebrating the 2021 Chinese New Year. The short film was shot in its entirety using an iPhone 12 Pro Max.

Wang's next project is a film adaptation of Alexander Weinstein's collection of science fiction short stories, Children of the New World. She has said that the project "centers on questions of family."

Most recently, she, along with Dani Melia had launched Local Time Productions, with a first-look deal at Amazon Studios.

== Personal life ==
Wang is fluent in English and Mandarin Chinese and also speaks some Spanish. She began dating fellow filmmaker Barry Jenkins in 2018. In December 2024, they were married at a private ceremony. They had a child in 2025.

== Filmmaking ==
=== Influences and approach ===
Cinematic influences were limited for Wang's film The Farewell. Previewed in her roadblocks to find financiers, producing a narrative that authentically communicated the Asian immigrant experience was considered new territory and there were few to none “comps” or comparatives, to guarantee its success. Because there were few films with which to compare the narrative, Wang's main influences were her family. In an attempt to curate and maintain authenticity, she requested her father to read the script and repeatedly asked “does this feel like I am properly representing everyone”. Through his perspective, the mundaneness garnered questions about interest and why the narrative was not dramatized further to satiate Western audiences.

When filming The Farewell in particular, the autobiographical narrative required an inquisitional approach to writing and directing, forcing Wang to take on a role not dissimilar to a journalist in an attempt to extract the raw emotions her family members experienced in regards to maintaining the lie about Nai Nai's illness as well as the identity struggle of being a hyphenate. In fact, amidst production Wang's family expressed uncertainty in her narrative claiming there are things she “doesn’t know enough about China to write the story”, evoking a sense of responsibility to research and interrogate further about her grandmother's history and her individual family members’ perspectives. An interview process ensued in an attempt to absorb as much authenticity as possible, sometimes provoking painful memories. Lu Hong, Wang's real great aunt, was cast as herself, evoking palpable emotional conflict in her performance, but also giving feedback behind the screen on accuracy, easing ethical quandaries and providing emotional support.

=== Collaborators ===
Wang's newest endeavor is an Amazon series in collaboration with producer and actress Nicole Kidman called “Expats”, based on the novel The Expatriates by Janice YK Lee. Bound by a sudden tragedy, three American women from Hong Kong form a complex bond that proves to be ever changing. Wang remarks on the series as an “examination of privilege, in many different ways whether it’s race, class, colorism” and expresses her excitement in the newly acquired creative freedom.

== Favorite films ==
In a 2022 poll with Sight and Sound, Wang named these ten films as her favorite.

- Yi Yi (2000)
- The Apartment (1960)
- Playtime (1967)
- Nights of Cabiria (1957)
- Viridiana (1961)
- Chungking Express (1994)
- Tokyo Story (1953)
- Jeanne Dielman, 23 Quai du Commerce, 1080 Bruxelles (1975)
- The Conversation (1974)
- Vagabond (1985)

== Filmography ==
=== Film ===
Short film

Year	Title	Director	Writer	Producer	Notes
2005	Pisces	Yes	Yes	Yes	
2006	Fishing the Gulf	Yes	No	No	Documentary short
2007	Can-Can	Yes	Yes	Yes	
2015	Touch	Yes	Yes	No	
2021	Nian	Yes	Yes	No	
2021	30/30 Vision: 3 Decades of Strand Releasing	Yes	Yes	No	Anthology film segment co-directed with Anna Franquesa-Solano

Feature film

Year	Title	Director	Writer	Producer	Distributor
2014	Posthumous	Yes	Yes	No	The Orchard
2019	The Farewell	Yes	Yes	Yes	A24

=== Television ===
Year	Title	Director	Writer	Executive producer	Episode	Distributor
2024	Expats	Yes	Yes	Yes	"The Peak"	Amazon MGM Studios
2024	Expats	Yes	No	Yes	"Mongkok"	Amazon MGM Studios
2024	Expats	Yes	No	Yes	"Mid-Levels"	Amazon MGM Studios
2024	Expats	Yes	No	Yes	"Mainland"	Amazon MGM Studios
2024	Expats	Yes	Yes	Yes	"Central"	Amazon MGM Studios
2024	Expats	Yes	No	Yes	"Home"	Amazon MGM Studios

=== Music videos ===
Year	Title	Artist	Notes
2011	"Nobody Told Me"	Vintage Trouble	
2014	"Still and Always Will"	Vintage Trouble	

== Awards and nominations ==
Year	Association	Category	Work	Result	Ref.
2020	British Academy Film Award	Best Film Not in the English Language	The Farewell	Nominated	
2020	Golden Globe Award	Best Foreign Language Film	The Farewell	Nominated	
2020	Independent Spirit Award	Best Feature	The Farewell	Won	
2019	American Film Institute	Top 10 Films	The Farewell	Won	
2019	Sundance Film Festival	Grand Prize Jury	The Farewell	Nominated	
2019	Palm Springs International Film Festival	Directors to Watch	The Farewell	Won	
2019	Gotham Award	Best Feature	The Farewell	Nominated	
2019	Gotham Award	Best Screenplay	The Farewell	Nominated	
2019	Gotham Award	Audience Award	The Farewell	Nominated	
2019	Broadcast Film Critics Association	Best Screenplay	The Farewell	Nominated	
2019	Chicago Film Critics Association Award	Best Original Screenplay	The Farewell	Nominated	
2019	Chicago Film Critics Association Award	Breakthrough Filmmaker	The Farewell	Nominated	
2019	Columbus Film Critics Association Award	Best Original Screenplay	The Farewell	Nominated	
2019	Denver Film Critics Society Award	Best Original Screenplay	The Farewell	Nominated	
2019	Florida Film Critics Circle Award	Best Original Screenplay	The Farewell	Nominated	
2019	Florida Film Critics Circle Award	Pauline Kael Breakout Award	The Farewell	Nominated	
2019	Georgia Film Critics Association Award	Best Original Screenplay	The Farewell	Nominated	
2019	Hollywood Critics Association Award	Best Original Screenplay	The Farewell	Nominated	
2019	Houston Film Critics Society Award	Best Screenplay	The Farewell	Nominated	
2019	Satellite Award	Best Original Screenplay	The Farewell	Nominated	
2019	North Carolina Film Critics Association Award	Best Original Screenplay	The Farewell	Nominated	
2019	North Texas Film Critics Association Award	Best Director	The Farewell	Nominated	
2019	Online Association of Female Film Critics Award	Best Original Screenplay	The Farewell	Nominated	
2019	San Francisco Bay Area Film Critics Circle Award	Best Original Screenplay	The Farewell	Nominated	
2019	Seattle Film Critics Society Award	Best Original Screenplay	The Farewell	Nominated	
2019	Seattle Film Critics Society Award	Best Foreign Language Film	The Farewell	Nominated	
2024	Gotham TV Awards	Spotlight Tribute	Expats	Won	
2024	IndieWire Honors	Crossover Award	Expats	Won	

== See also ==
- List of Boston College people
