= The Farewell (2019 film) =

American film by Lulu Wang

- Theatrical release poster
- Directed by: Lulu Wang
- Written by: Lulu Wang
- Produced by: Daniele Melia; Marc Turtletaub; Peter Saraf; Andrew Miano; Chris Weitz; Jane Zheng; Lulu Wang; Anita Gou
- Starring: Awkwafina; Tzi Ma; Diana Lin; Zhao Shu-zhen
- Cinematography: Anna Franquesa Solano
- Edited by: Michael Taylor; Matthew Friedman
- Music by: Alex Weston
- Production companies: Ray Productions; Big Beach; Depth of Field; Kindred Spirit
- Distributed by: A24
- Release dates: January 25, 2019 (Sundance); July 12, 2019 (United States)
- Running time: 100 minutes
- Country: United States
- Languages: Mandarin; English
- Budget: $3 million
- Box office: $25.5 million

The Farewell is a 2019 American comedy-drama film, written and directed by Lulu Wang. It stars Awkwafina, Tzi Ma, Diana Lin, and Zhao Shuzhen. The film follows a Chinese American woman named Billi, who learns her grandmother (referred to as Nai Nai) has only a short while left to live. Wishing to see Nai Nai before she dies but also not wanting to reveal her fatal illness to her, Billi's family uses an impromptu wedding as a pretense to gather in their hometown. Throughout the preparation for the wedding, Billi struggles with conflicted feelings about her family's deception and whether she should reveal the truth to Nai Nai.

The film is based in part on director Wang's life experiences, which she first publicly discussed as part of her radio story "What You Don't Know", which appeared as part of an episode of This American Life.

The Farewell premiered at the Sundance Film Festival on January 25, 2019 and was theatrically released in the United States on July 12 by A24. It received widespread acclaim from critics, with particular praise for Wang's screenplay and the performances of Awkwafina and Zhao Shuzhen. At the 77th Golden Globe Awards, the film was nominated for Best Foreign Language Film and Best Actress, with Awkwafina winning for the latter. The Farewell has dialogue in both English and Mandarin Chinese.

== Plot ==
Aspiring Chinese-American writer Billi maintains a close relationship with her Nai Nai (paternal grandmother) who lives in Changchun, China. After receiving a rejection letter for a Guggenheim Fellowship, she discovers from her parents, Haiyan and Jian, that Nai Nai has been diagnosed with terminal lung cancer, and is predicted to have only a few months left to live.

Through deception and manipulation of medical test results, the diagnosis is kept a secret from Nai Nai herself. She is, instead, falsely told that her recent doctor visits have only revealed benign findings. A wedding for Billi's cousin from Japan, Hao Hao, has been planned in China as an excuse to unite the family to spend what is expected to be one last time with Nai Nai. Fearing Billi will end up exposing the lie to her grandmother, Haiyan and Jian tell her to remain in New York City.

Billi disobeys her parents' orders and flies to Changchun shortly after the rest of the family arrive. She assures her parents that she will not reveal the cancer diagnosis to Nai Nai. Throughout the trip, however, she clashes with the rest of the family over their deliberate dishonesty towards her grandmother. Guilt-ridden, Billi expresses conflicted thoughts with her parents over the Chinese cultural beliefs that result in a family refusing to disclose a life-threatening disease, including the trauma of her grandfather dying without her knowledge after they moved to the United States.

One night, her uncle, Haibin, contends that the lie allows the family to bear the emotional burden of the diagnosis, rather than Nai Nai herself—a practice of collectivism that he acknowledges differs from the individualistic values common in Western culture. Billi later learns that Nai Nai also told a similar lie to her husband up until his death when he was terminally ill.

On the day of the wedding, both Haibin and Hao Hao break down in tears on separate occasions but manage to proceed through the banquet without raising Nai Nai's suspicions. Billi intercepts Nai Nai's medical test results from the hospital and has it altered to reflect a clean bill of health, helping to maintain the lie.

That night, Nai Nai gives Billi a hóngbāo, encouraging her to spend the money as she chooses. Billi admits that she wants to stay in Changchun to spend more time with Nai Nai, but Nai Nai declines, telling her that she needs to live her own life. When Billi reveals the Guggenheim Fellowship rejection to her, Nai Nai encourages Billi to keep an open mind and not get hung up on this failure, "don't be the bull endlessly ramming its horns into the corner of the room." She says that "life is not about what things one does, but more so about how one goes about doing them".

Billi keeps her promise to maintain the lie. She shares a tearful goodbye with Nai Nai as the visiting family members return to their homes in Japan and America. A title card reveals that six years after her diagnosis, the woman Nai Nai's character was based on, Wang's grandmother, is still alive.

== Cast ==
- Awkwafina as Billi Wang (王比莉)
- Tzi Ma as Haiyan Wang (王海燕), Billi's father
- Diana Lin as Jian Lu (陆建), Billi's mother
- Zhao Shu-zhen as Nai Nai (奶奶; 'Paternal grandmother'), Billi's paternal grandmother
- Lu Hong (playing herself) as Little Nai Nai (姨奶奶; 'Great Aunt/The sister of the mother of one's father'), Billi's grandmother's younger sister
- Jiang Yongbo as Haibin Wang (王海滨), Haiyan's older brother
- Chen Han as Hao Hao (浩浩), Haibin's son
- Aoi Mizuhara as Aiko (爱子), Hao Hao's Japanese fiancée
- Zhang Jing as Yuping, Haiyan's cousin
- Li Xiang as Aunty Ling, Haibin's wife
- Yang Xuejian as Mr. Li
- Jim Liu as Dr. Song (宋医生)

== Production ==
Lulu Wang faced obstacles when pitching her film about a Chinese American family. She says she had many disheartening encounters with American and Chinese financiers who wanted to include a "prominent white character into the narrative and punch up the nuanced drama to turn it into a broad comedy."

Wang later created an episode titled "What You Don't Know" for This American Life in April, 2016 based on her family's story. This caught the attention of producer Chris Weitz who helped secure financing for the film.

Wang said that the film was based on her grandmother's illness, stating that "I always felt the divide in my relationship to my family versus my relationship to my classmates and to my colleagues and to the world that I inhabit. That's just the nature of being an immigrant and straddling two cultures."

The film was primarily shot in Changchun, China, over the course of 24 days in June 2018. Filming also took place in New York. In an interview with Filmmaker, cinematographer Anna Franquesa Solano stated that the references for the film included Force Majeure and Still Walking. However, she added that her main source of inspiration came from "spending time with Lulu's family at their home in Changchun, during pre-production."

Director Lulu Wang says that she kept the secret from her grandmother during and after film production. It was awkward to keep the secret when the grandmother visited the filming, a block from her home. Wang claims her grandmother eventually found out when a friend sent her a review of the film.

== Release ==
The film had its premiere in the U.S. Dramatic Competition section at the 2019 Sundance Film Festival on January 25, 2019. In January 2019, A24 acquired worldwide distribution rights to the film for $7 million, over Netflix, Amazon Studios, and Fox Searchlight Pictures. It was released in the United States on July 12, 2019. A fully Chinese-subtitled version of the film played in select theaters on September 8, 2019.

== Reception ==
=== Box office ===
The Farewell grossed $17.7 million in the United States and Canada, and $7.8 million in other territories, for a total worldwide gross of $25.5 million, against a production budget of $3 million.

In its opening weekend the film made $355,662 from four theaters for an average of $88,916 per venue; at the time, it was the best average of 2019, besting Avengers: Endgame's $76,601. It expanded to 35 theaters in its second weekend and earned $1.14 million, then made $1.5 million from 135 theaters in its third. It continued to expand in the following weeks, making $2.4 million from 426 theaters and then $2.2 million from 705 theaters. The film expanded further to over 800 theaters in the next few weeks, $1.4 million from 861 theaters, $882,623 from 816 theaters and $841,414 from 891 theaters.

The Farewell was a box office "flop" in China, grossing only $580,000 by January 2020 in what was then the world's second-largest film market. According to Sixth Tone, the film's delayed theatrical release—to prevent it from being lost in the hype surrounding Disney’s Frozen 2—was a big factor in the low gross since many in China had already seen it abroad or online.

=== Critical response ===
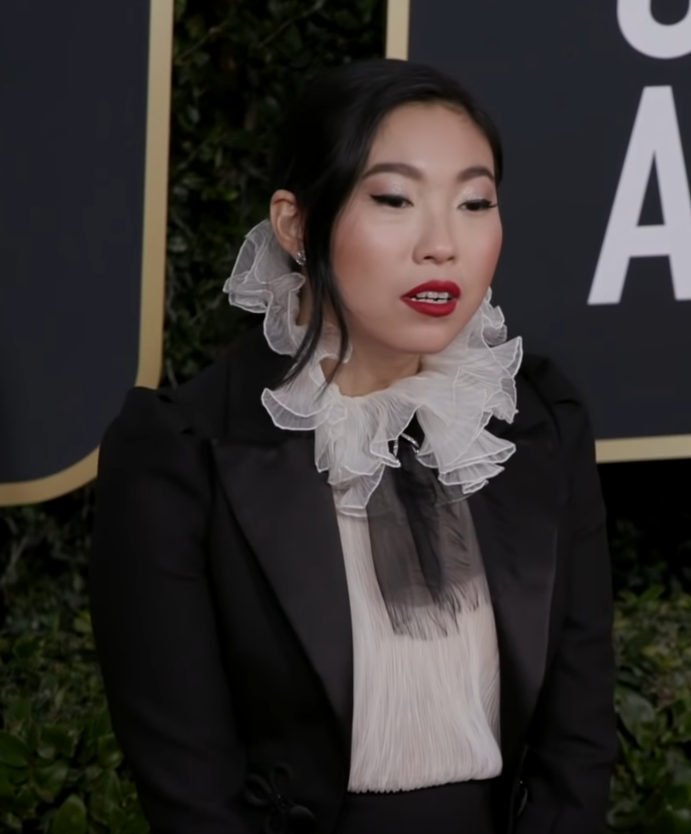
Awkwafina's performance as Billi garnered widespread critical acclaim.

On Rotten Tomatoes, the film holds an approval rating of 97%, with an average rating of 8.5/10, based on 345 reviews. The website's critics' consensus reads: "The Farewell deftly captures complicated family dynamics with a poignant, well-acted drama that marries cultural specificity with universally relatable themes." On Metacritic, the film has a weighted average score of 89 out of 100 based on 47 critic reviews, indicating "universal acclaim".

Eric Kohn of IndieWire gave the film an A− grade and praised Awkwafina's performance, writing, "As a Chinese-American grappling with the traditionalism of her past and its impact on the future, she's an absorbing engine for the movie's introspective look at a most unusual family reunion." Christy Lemire writing for RogerEbert.com gave the film 4 out of 4 stars, saying Zhao Shuzhen is "the most frequent source of laughs", but went on to say that "as delightful as [Zhao] is in this crucial, central role, she will also quietly rip your heart out by the film's end".

Richard Lawson of Vanity Fair wrote, "Wang movingly tells not just a story about the negotiations of familial love, but also of the immigrant experience, of revisiting one's homeland to, in some senses, say goodbye to it." David Rooney of The Hollywood Reporter commented, "its moments of sweet sentimentality are fully earned and heartfelt." Brian Lowry of CNN.com described it as a "small, melancholy movie that explores cultural differences and dealing with death in an utterly charming, understated manner." Hong Kong playwright Jingan Young commented on the film's depiction of the differences between western and Chinese family values, claiming that "the family’s decision to tell a 'good lie' is a metaphor for the collective delusion of living under the Chinese Communist party."

In 2021, members of Writers Guild of America West (WGAW) and Writers Guild of America, East (WGAE) voted the film's screenplay 91st in WGA’s 101 Greatest Screenplays of the 21st Century (so far).

=== Accolades ===
Year	Award	Category	Nominated work	Result	Ref.
2020	Golden Globe Awards	Best Actress – Musical or Comedy	Awkwafina	Won	
2020	Golden Globe Awards	Best Foreign Language Film	The Farewell	Nominated	
2020	British Academy Film Awards	Best Film Not in the English Language	Lulu Wang and Daniele Melia	Nominated	
2020	Critics' Choice Awards	Best Actress	Awkwafina	Nominated	
2020	Critics' Choice Awards	Best Supporting Actress	Zhao Shuzhen	Nominated	
2020	Critics' Choice Awards	Best Original Screenplay	The Farewell	Nominated	
2020	Critics' Choice Awards	Best Comedy	The Farewell	Nominated	
2020	Independent Spirit Awards	Best Feature	Lulu Wang	Won	
2020	Independent Spirit Awards	Best Supporting Female	Zhao Shuzhen	Won	
2019	Gotham Awards	Best Feature	The Farewell	Nominated	
2019	Gotham Awards	Best Actress	Awkwafina	Won	
2019	Gotham Awards	Best Screenplay	Lulu Wang	Nominated	
2019	Sundance London	Audience Favourite	The Farewell	Won	
2019	Palm Springs International Film Festival	Directors to Watch	Lulu Wang	Won	
2020	Santa Barbara International Film Festival	Virtuoso Award	Awkwafina	Won	
2019	Rome Film Festival	BNL People's Choice Award	The Farewell	Nominated	
2019	National Board of Review	Top 10 Independent Films	The Farewell	Won	
2019	American Film Institute Awards	AFI Movies of the Year	The Farewell	Won	
2020	Casting Society of America	Feature – Comedy	Leslie Woo	Nominated	
2020	Hollywood Critics Association Awards	Best Picture	The Farewell	Nominated	
2020	Hollywood Critics Association Awards	Best Actress	Awkwafina	Nominated	
2020	Hollywood Critics Association Awards	Best Supporting Actress	Zhao Shuzhen	Nominated	
2020	Hollywood Critics Association Awards	Best Original Screenplay	The Farewell	Nominated	
2020	Hollywood Critics Association Awards	Best Female Director	Lulu Wang	Nominated	
2020	Hollywood Critics Association Awards	Independent Film	The Farewell	Won	
2020	Hollywood Critics Association Awards	Foreign Language Film	The Farewell	Nominated	
2019	Chicago Film Critics Association	Most Promising Filmmaker	Lulu Wang	Won	
2019	Chicago Film Critics Association	Best Foreign Language Film	The Farewell	Nominated	
2019	Chicago Film Critics Association	Best Actress	Awkwafina	Nominated	
2019	Chicago Film Critics Association	Best Supporting Actress	Zhao Shuzhen	Nominated	
2019	Chicago Film Critics Association	Best Original Screenplay	Lulu Wang	Nominated	
2019	Detroit Film Critics Society Awards	Best Ensemble	The Farewell	Nominated	
2019	Detroit Film Critics Society Awards	Breakthrough	Lulu Wang	Nominated	
2019	San Diego Film Critics Society Awards	Best Actress	Awkwafina	Nominated	
2019	San Diego Film Critics Society Awards	Best Supporting Actress	Zhao Shuzhen	Won	
2019	San Diego Film Critics Society Awards	Best Foreign Language Film	The Farewell	Nominated	
2020	Houston Film Critics Society Awards	Best Picture	The Farewell	Nominated	
2020	Houston Film Critics Society Awards	Best Actress	Awkwafina	Nominated	
2020	Houston Film Critics Society Awards	Best Supporting Actress	Zhao Shuzhen	Won	
2020	Houston Film Critics Society Awards	Best Director	Lulu Wang	Nominated	
2020	Houston Film Critics Society Awards	Best Screenplay	The Farewell	Nominated	
2019	Los Angeles Film Critics Association	Best Supporting Actress	Zhao Shuzhen	Runner-up	
2019	Satellite Awards	Best Actress – Comedy or Musical	Awkwafina	Won	
2019	Satellite Awards	Best Supporting Actress	Zhao Shuzhen	Nominated	
2019	Satellite Awards	Best Motion Picture – Comedy	The Farewell	Nominated	
2019	Satellite Awards	Best Original Screenplay	The Farewell	Nominated	
2019	Atlanta Film Festival	Audience Award – Feature Film	The Farewell	Won	
2019	Heartland Film Festival	Truly Moving Picture Award	The Farewell	Won	
2019	Seminci	Youth Jury	The Farewell	Won	
2020	AACTA Awards	Best International Actress	Awkwafina	Nominated	
2020	AARP Movies For Grownups	Best Picture	The Farewell	Nominated	
2020	AARP Movies For Grownups	Best Supporting Actress	Zhao Shuzhen	Nominated	
2020	AARP Movies For Grownups	Best Intergenerational	The Farewell	Won	
2020	AARP Movies For Grownups	Best Foreign Language Film	The Farewell	Nominated	
