= IndieWire Critics Poll =

Indiewire Critics Poll
- Country: United States
- Presented by: Indiewire
- First award: 2006
- Website: http://www.indiewire.com

The IndieWire Critics Poll is an annual poll by American film industry and film criticism website IndieWire that recognizes the best in American and international films in a ranking of ten or five films across different categories.

The winners are chosen by the votes of the critics from IndieWire and other invited critics from around the world. The poll began in 2006.

== Categories ==
As of 2024, rankings for nine categories were presented:

=== Current ===
- Best Film
- Best Director
- Best Performance
- Best Screenplay
- Best Cinematography
- Best International Film
- Best Documentary
- Best First Feature
- Best Film Opening Next Year

=== Discontinued ===
- Best Lead Performance (Best Actor and Best Actress)
- Best Supporting Performance (Best Supporting Actor and Best Supporting Actress)
- Best Undistributed Film
- Best Original Score/Soundtrack
- Best Editing
- Best Overlooked Film
- Most Anticipated Film
- Best Editing
- Best Animated Film
- Best Ensemble

== Editions ==
- 2006
- 2007
- 2008
- 2009
- 2010
- 2011
- 2012
- 2013
- 2014
- 2015
- 2016
- 2017
- 2018
- 2019
- 2020
- 2021
- 2022
- 2023
- 2024

== Winners and nominees ==
=== Best Film ===
Year	1st Place	2nd Place	3rd Place	4th Place	5th Place	6th Place	7th Place	8th Place	9th Place	10th Place
2006	The Death of Mr. Lazarescu	L'Enfant	The Departed	Inland Empire	Army of Shadows (Note: While the film was released in 1969 in France and in 1970 in Italy, it was not released in the United States until 2006.)	Three Times	Old Joy	United 93	Children of Men	Half Nelson
2007	There Will Be Blood	Zodiac	No Country for Old Men	Syndromes and a Century	4 Months, 3 Weeks, 2 Days	I'm Not There	The Assassination of Jesse James by the Coward Robert Ford	Colossal Youth	Killer of Sheep (Note: While the film premiered at Whitney Museum in 1978, it was not released in American theaters until 2007.)	Offside
2008	Flight of the Red Balloon	A Christmas Tale	WALL-E	Wendy and Lucy	Happy-Go-Lucky	Paranoid Park	Still Life	Silent Light	Synecdoche, New York	Waltz with Bashir
2009	Summer Hours	The Hurt Locker; A Serious Man	Inglourious Basterds	Fantastic Mr. Fox	35 Shots of Rum	The Headless Woman	Two Lovers	Up	Police, Adjective	In the Loop
2010	The Social Network	Carlos	Winter's Bone	Black Swan	Everyone Else	Dogtooth	The Ghost Writer	Mother	I Am Love	Another Year; Wild Grass
2011	The Tree of Life	Melancholia	A Separation	Drive	Uncle Boonmee Who Can Recall His Past Lives	Certified Copy	Mysteries of Lisbon	Hugo	Margaret	Meek's Cutoff
2012	Holy Motors	Zero Dark Thirty	The Master	Amour	This Is Not a Film	Moonrise Kingdom	Beasts of the Southern Wild	Once Upon a Time in Anatolia	The Turin Horse	Lincoln
2013	12 Years a Slave	Inside Llewyn Davis	Before Midnight	Her	Gravity	The Act of Killing	Leviathan	Blue Is the Warmest Colour	Upstream Color	Frances Ha
2014	Boyhood	Under the Skin	The Grand Budapest Hotel	Birdman	Inherent Vice	Goodbye to Language	Ida	Whiplash	Only Lovers Left Alive	Selma
2015	Mad Max: Fury Road	Carol	Spotlight	Inside Out	Phoenix	Brooklyn	Anomalisa	The Assassin	The Look of Silence	Son of Saul
2016	Moonlight	Manchester by the Sea	La La Land	Toni Erdmann	O.J.: Made in America	Paterson	The Handmaiden	Arrival	Hell or High Water	Jackie
2017	Get Out	Lady Bird	Dunkirk	Phantom Thread	The Florida Project	The Shape of Water	Call Me by Your Name	Personal Shopper	Three Billboards Outside Ebbing, Missouri	The Post
2018	Roma	First Reformed	Burning	The Favourite	Cold War	Shoplifters	BlacKkKlansman	Zama	You Were Never Really Here	If Beale Street Could Talk
2019	Parasite	The Irishman	Marriage Story	Once Upon a Time...in Hollywood	Portrait of a Lady on Fire	Pain and Glory	Uncut Gems	The Souvenir	Joker	Little Women
2020	Nomadland	Never Rarely Sometimes Always	First Cow	Lovers Rock	I'm Thinking of Ending Things	Beanpole	Time	Da 5 Bloods	Martin Eden	Bacurau
2021	The Power of the Dog	Drive My Car	Licorice Pizza	The Worst Person in the World	Memoria	The French Dispatch	Flee	Petite Maman	Passing	C'mon C'mon
2022	Tár	Aftersun	The Banshees of Inisherin	Everything Everywhere All At Once	The Fabelmans	Decision to Leave	Nope	RRR	Top Gun: Maverick	All the Beauty and the Bloodshed
2023	Killers of the Flower Moon	Oppenheimer	Poor Things	Past Lives	May December	The Zone of Interest	Anatomy of a Fall	Barbie	The Holdovers	Asteroid City
2024	Anora	The Brutalist	Nickel Boys	All We Imagine as Light	Challengers	I Saw the TV Glow	The Substance	Dune: Part Two	Do Not Expect Too Much from the End of the World	Hard Truths

=== Best Director ===
Year	1st Place	2nd Place	3rd Place	4th Place	5th Place	6th Place	7th Place	8th Place	9th Place	10th Place
2006	Martin Scorsese (The Departed)	David Lynch (Inland Empire)	Cristi Puiu (The Death of Mr. Lazarescu)	Alfonso Cuarón (Children of Men); Jean-Pierre and Luc Dardenne (L'Enfant)		—N/a				
2007	Paul Thomas Anderson (There Will Be Blood)	David Fincher (Zodiac)	Joel and Ethan Coen (No Country for Old Men)	Todd Haynes (I'm Not There)	Cristian Mungiu (4 Months, 3 Weeks and 2 Days)	—N/a				
2008	Hou Hsiao-hsien (Flight of the Red Balloon)	Mike Leigh (Happy-Go-Lucky)	Arnaud Desplechin (A Christmas Tale); José Luis Guerin (In the City of Sylvia)		Carlos Reygadas (Silent Light)	—N/a				
2009	Kathryn Bigelow (The Hurt Locker)	Lucrecia Martel (The Headless Woman)	Olivier Assayas (Summer Hours)	Claire Denis (35 Shots of Rum); James Gray (Two Lovers)	Joel and Ethan Coen (A Serious Man); Michael Haneke (The White Ribbon)	—N/a				
2010	David Fincher (The Social Network)	Olivier Assayas (Carlos)	Darren Aronofsky (Black Swan)	Roman Polanski (The Ghost Writer)	Gaspar Noé (Enter the Void)	—N/a				
2011	Terrence Malick (The Tree of Life)	Martin Scorsese (Hugo); Lars von Trier (Melancholia)	Nicolas Winding Refn (Drive)	Raúl Ruiz (Mysteries of Lisbon)	Kelly Reichardt (Meek's Cutoff)	—N/a				
2012	Kathryn Bigelow (Zero Dark Thirty)	Paul Thomas Anderson (The Master)	Leos Carax (Holy Motors)	Michael Haneke (Amour)	Miguel Gomes (Tabu)	—N/a				
2013	Steve McQueen (12 Years a Slave)	Alfonso Cuarón (Gravity)	Joel and Ethan Coen (Inside Llewyn Davis)	Spike Jonze (Her)	Shane Carruth (Upstream Color)	David O. Russell (American Hustle)	Paolo Sorrentino (The Great Beauty)	Martin Scorsese (The Wolf of Wall Street)	Richard Linklater (Before Midnight)	Harmony Korine (Spring Breakers)
2014	Richard Linklater (Boyhood)	Wes Anderson (The Grand Budapest Hotel)	Alejandro G. Iñárritu (Birdman)	Jonathan Glazer (Under the Skin)	Jean-Luc Godard (Goodbye to Language)	Ava DuVernay (Selma)	Paul Thomas Anderson (Inherent Vice)	David Fincher (Gone Girl)	Damien Chazelle (Whiplash)	Paweł Pawlikowski (Ida)
2015	George Miller (Mad Max: Fury Road)	Todd Haynes (Carol)	Hou Hsiao-hsien (The Assassin)	László Nemes (Son of Saul)	Tom McCarthy (Spotlight)	Alejandro G. Iñárritu (The Revenant)	Christian Petzold (Phoenix)	Charlie Kaufman, Duke Johnson (Anomalisa)	John Crowley (Brooklyn)	Guy Maddin, Evan Johnson (The Forbidden Room)
2016	Barry Jenkins (Moonlight)	Damien Chazelle (La La Land)	Maren Ade (Toni Erdmann)	Kenneth Lonergan (Manchester by the Sea)	Park Chan-wook (The Handmaiden)	Pablo Larraín (Jackie)	Kelly Reichardt (Certain Women); Denis Villeneuve (Arrival)		Paul Verhoeven (Elle)	Martin Scorsese (Silence)
2017	Paul Thomas Anderson (Phantom Thread)	Luca Guadagnino (Call Me by Your Name)	Greta Gerwig (Lady Bird)	Sean Baker (The Florida Project)	Jordan Peele (Get Out)	—N/a				
2018	Alfonso Cuarón (Roma)	Lee Chang-Dong (Burning)	Lynne Ramsay (You Were Never Really Here)	Yorgos Lanthimos (The Favourite)	Paul Schrader (First Reformed)	—N/a				
2019	Bong Joon-ho (Parasite)	Martin Scorsese (The Irishman)	Quentin Tarantino (Once Upon a Time... in Hollywood)	Céline Sciamma (Portrait of a Lady on Fire)	Josh Safdie and Benny Safdie (Uncut Gems)	Noah Baumbach (Marriage Story)	Pedro Almodóvar (Pain and Glory)	Greta Gerwig (Little Women)	Joanna Hogg (The Souvenir)	Todd Phillips (Joker)
2020	Chloe Zhao (Nomadland)	Steve McQueen (Lovers Rock)	Eliza Hittman (Never Rarely Sometimes Always)	Kelly Reichardt (First Cow)	David Fincher (Mank)	Spike Lee (Da 5 Bloods)	Charlie Kaufman (I'm Thinking of Ending Things)	Pietro Marcello (Martin Eden)	Kantemir Balagov (Beanpole)	Lee Isaac Chung (Minari)
2021	Jane Campion (The Power of the Dog)	Ryusuke Hamaguchi (Drive My Car)	Apichatpong Weerasethakul (Memoria)	Denis Villeneuve (Dune)	Paul Thomas Anderson (Licorice Pizza)	Wes Anderson (The French Dispatch)	David Lowery (The Green Knight)	Steven Spielberg (West Side Story)	Pablo Larraín (Spencer)	Celine Sciamma (Petite Maman)
2022	Todd Field (Tár)	Daniel Kwan and Daniel Scheinert (Everything Everywhere All at Once)	S. S. Rajamouli (RRR)	Steven Spielberg (The Fabelmans)	Charlotte Wells (Aftersun)	Park Chan-wook (Decision to Leave)	Martin McDonagh (The Banshees of Inisherin)	Jerzy Skolimowski (EO)	Jordan Peele (Nope)	Alice Diop (Saint Omer)
2023	Martin Scorsese (Killers of the Flower Moon)	Christopher Nolan (Oppenheimer)	Jonathan Glazer (The Zone of Interest)	Yorgos Lanthimos (Poor Things)	Todd Haynes (May December)	Greta Gerwig (Barbie)	Celine Song (Past Lives)	Wes Anderson (Asteroid City)	Justine Triet (Anatomy of a Fall)	Albert Serra (Pacifiction)
2024	Brady Corbet (The Brutalist)	RaMell Ross (Nickel Boys)	Sean Baker (Anora)	Payal Kapadia (All We Imagine as Light)	Luca Guadagnino (Challengers)	Jane Schoenbrun (I Saw the TV Glow)	Coralie Fargeat (The Substance)	Jacques Audiard (Emilia Pérez)	Bertrand Bonello (The Beast)	Edward Berger (Conclave)

=== Best Performance ===
Year	1st Place	2nd Place	3rd Place	4th Place	5th Place	6th Place	7th Place	8th Place	9th Place	10th Place
Best Lead Performance
2006	Helen Mirren (The Queen)	Ryan Gosling (Half Nelson)	Laura Dern (Inland Empire)	Sacha Baron Cohen (Borat)	Forest Whitaker (The Last King of Scotland)	Will Oldham (Old Joy)	Meryl Streep (The Devil Wears Prada)	Ioan Fiscuteanu (The Death of Mr. Lazarescu)	Penélope Cruz (Volver)	Sandra Hüller (Requiem)
2007	Daniel Day-Lewis (There Will Be Blood)	Anamaria Marinca (4 Months, 3 Weeks and 2 Days)	Julie Christie (Away from Her)	Carice van Houten (Black Book)	Viggo Mortensen (Eastern Promises)	Marion Cotillard (La Vie en Rose)	George Clooney (Michael Clayton)	Mathieu Amalric (The Diving Bell and the Butterfly)	Michael Shannon (Bug)	Elliot Page (Juno)
2008	Mickey Rourke (The Wrestler)	Sally Hawkins (Happy-Go-Lucky)	Michelle Williams (Wendy and Lucy)	Sean Penn (Milk)	Juliette Binoche (Flight of the Red Balloon)	Asia Argento (Boarding Gate, The Mother of Tears, The Last Mistress)	Melissa Leo (Frozen River)	Anne Hathaway (Rachel Getting Married)	Guillaume Depardieu (The Duchess of Langeais)	Philip Seymour Hoffman (Synecdoche, New York)
2009	Tilda Swinton (Julia)	Charlotte Gainsbourg (Antichrist)	Jeremy Renner (The Hurt Locker)	María Onetto (The Headless Woman); Joaquin Phoenix (Two Lovers)	Tom Hardy (Bronson)	Matt Damon (The Informant!); Colin Firth (A Single Man)	Michael Stuhlbarg (A Serious Man)	Jeff Bridges (Crazy Heart); Nicolas Cage (Bad Lieutenant: Port of Call New Orleans); Meryl Streep (Julie & Julia)	Arta Dobroshi (Lorna's Silence); Carey Mulligan (An Education); Gabourey Sidibe (Precious)	Catalina Saavedra (The Maid)
2010	Edgar Ramírez (Carlos)	Jesse Eisenberg (The Social Network)	Natalie Portman (Black Swan)	Jennifer Lawrence (Winter's Bone)	Kim Hye-ja (Mother)	Tilda Swinton (I Am Love)	Jeon Do-yeon (Secret Sunshine)	Isabelle Huppert (White Material)	Lesley Manville (Another Year)	Ryan Gosling (Blue Valentine)
2011	Michael Fassbender (Shame); Michael Shannon (Take Shelter)	Anna Paquin (Margaret)	Juliette Binoche (Certified Copy)	Yoon Jeong-hee (Poetry)	Kirsten Dunst (Melancholia)	Elizabeth Olsen (Martha Marcy May Marlene)	Tilda Swinton (We Need to Talk About Kevin)	Jean Dujardin (The Artist)	Charlize Theron (Young Adult)	George Clooney (The Descendants)
2012	Denis Lavant (Holy Motors)	Joaquin Phoenix (The Master)	Daniel Day-Lewis (Lincoln)	Jessica Chastain (Zero Dark Thirty)	Emmanuelle Riva (Amour)	Jean-Louis Trintignant (Amour)	Rachel Weisz (The Deep Blue Sea)	Quvenzhané Wallis (Beasts of the Southern Wild)	Nina Hoss (Barbara)	Jennifer Lawrence (Silver Linings Playbook)
2013	Chiwetel Ejiofor (12 Years a Slave)	Adèle Exarchopoulos (Blue Is the Warmest Colour)	Cate Blanchett (Blue Jasmine)	Oscar Isaac (Inside Llewyn Davis)	Greta Gerwig (Frances Ha)	Brie Larson (Short Term 12)	Robert Redford (All Is Lost)	Joaquin Phoenix (Her)	Matthew McConaughey (Dallas Buyers Club)	Sandra Bullock (Gravity)
2014
2014	Best Lead Actor									
2014	Ralph Fiennes (The Grand Budapest Hotel)	Jake Gyllenhaal (Nightcrawler)	Michael Keaton (Birdman)	Timothy Spall (Mr. Turner)	Joaquin Phoenix (Inherent Vice)	David Oyelowo (Selma)	Eddie Redmayne (The Theory of Everything)	Tom Hardy (Locke)	Jack O'Connell (Starred Up)	Benedict Cumberbatch (The Imitation Game)
2014	Best Lead Actress									
2014	Marion Cotillard (Two Days, One Night)	Scarlett Johansson (Under the Skin)	Rosamund Pike (Gone Girl)	Essie Davis (The Babadook)	Marion Cotillard (The Immigrant)	Julianne Moore (Still Alice)	Reese Witherspoon (Wild)	Tilda Swinton (Only Lovers Left Alive)	Jenny Slate (Obvious Child)	Anne Dorval (Mommy)
2015
2015	Best Lead Actor									
2015	Michael Fassbender (Steve Jobs)	Géza Röhrig (Son of Saul)	Michael B. Jordan (Creed)	Christopher Abbott (James White)	Tom Courtenay (45 Years)	Leonardo DiCaprio (The Revenant)	Ben Mendelsohn (The Big Short)	Jason Segel (The End of the Tour)	Paul Dano (Love & Mercy)	Josh Lucas (The Mend)
2015	Best Lead Actress									
2015	Charlotte Rampling (45 Years)	Saoirse Ronan (Brooklyn)	Brie Larson (Room)	Nina Hoss (Phoenix)	Cate Blanchett (Carol)	Rooney Mara (Carol)	Charlize Theron (Mad Max: Fury Road)	Bel Powley (The Diary of a Teenage Girl)	Juliette Binoche (Clouds of Sils Maria)	Elisabeth Moss (Queen of Earth)
2016
2016	Best Lead Actor									
2016	Casey Affleck (Manchester by the Sea)	Adam Driver (Paterson)	Colin Farrell (The Lobster)	Peter Simonischek (Toni Erdmann)	Denzel Washington (Fences)	Joel Edgerton (Loving)	Ryan Gosling (La La Land)	Viggo Mortensen (Captain Fantastic)	Vincent Lindon (The Measure of a Man)	Ethan Hawke (Born to Be Blue)
2016	Best Lead Actress									
2016	Isabelle Huppert (Elle)	Natalie Portman (Jackie)	Sandra Hüller (Toni Erdmann)	Sônia Braga (Aquarius)	Emma Stone (La La Land)	Amy Adams (Arrival)	Rebecca Hall (Christine)	Ruth Negga (Loving)	Annette Bening (20th Century Women)	Isabelle Huppert (Things to Come)
2017
2017	Best Actor									
2017	Timothée Chalamet (Call Me by Your Name)	Daniel Day-Lewis (Phantom Thread)	Robert Pattinson (Good Time)	James Franco (The Disaster Artist)	Daniel Kaluuya (Get Out); Gary Oldman (Darkest Hour)	—N/a				
2017	Best Actress									
2017	Saoirse Ronan (Lady Bird)	Frances McDormand (Three Billboards Outside Ebbing, Missouri)	Cynthia Nixon (A Quiet Passion)	Sally Hawkins (The Shape of Water)	Kristen Stewart (Personal Shopper)	—N/a				
2018
2018	Best Actor									
2018	Ethan Hawke (First Reformed)	Joaquin Phoenix (You Were Never Really Here)	Willem Dafoe (At Eternity's Gate)	Rami Malek (Bohemian Rhapsody)	Viggo Mortensen (Green Book)	—N/a				
2018	Best Actress									
2018	Olivia Colman (The Favourite)	Yalitza Aparicio (Roma)	Toni Collette (Hereditary)	Joanna Kulig (Cold War)	Melissa McCarthy (Can You Ever Forgive Me?)	—N/a				
2019
2019	Best Actor									
2019	Adam Driver (Marriage Story)	Antonio Banderas (Pain and Glory)	Adam Sandler (Uncut Gems)	Joaquin Phoenix (Joker)	Robert De Niro (The Irishman)	Leonardo DiCaprio (Once Upon a Time...in Hollywood)	Eddie Murphy (Dolemite Is My Name)	Taron Egerton (Rocketman)	Song Kang-ho (Parasite)	Brad Pitt (Ad Astra)
2019	Best Actress									
2019	Lupita Nyong'o (Us)	Scarlett Johansson (Marriage Story)	Elisabeth Moss (Her Smell)	Renée Zellweger (Judy)	Awkwafina (The Farewell)	Florence Pugh (Midsommar)	Mary Kay Place (Diane)	Zhao Tao (Ash Is Purest White)	Saoirse Ronan (Little Women)	Adèle Haenel (Portrait of a Lady on Fire)
Best Performance
2020	Riz Ahmed (Sound of Metal)	Frances McDormand (Nomadland)	Chadwick Boseman (Ma Rainey's Black Bottom)	Delroy Lindo (Da 5 Bloods)	Maria Bakalova (Borat Subsequent Moviefilm)	Jessie Buckley (I'm Thinking of Ending Things)	Luca Marinelli (Martin Eden)	Gary Oldman (Mank)	Carrie Coon (The Nest)	Mads Mikkelsen (Another Round)
2021	Benedict Cumberbatch (The Power of the Dog)	Kristen Stewart (Spencer)	Renate Reinsve (The Worst Person in the World)	Nicolas Cage (Pig)	Alana Haim (Licorice Pizza)	Olivia Colman (The Lost Daughter)	Tessa Thompson (Passing)	Peter Dinklage (Cyrano)	Hidetoshi Nishijima (Drive My Car)	Will Smith (King Richard)
2022	Cate Blanchett (Tár)	Colin Farrell (The Banshees of Inisherin)	Michelle Yeoh (Everything Everywhere All at Once)	Danielle Deadwyler (Till)	Park Ji-min (Return to Seoul)	Brendan Fraser (The Whale)	Tilda Swinton (The Eternal Daughter)	Paul Mescal (Aftersun)	Mia Goth (Pearl)	Guslagie Malanda (Saint Omer); Austin Butler (Elvis); Léa Seydoux (One Fine Morning)
2023	Emma Stone (Poor Things)	Lily Gladstone (Killers of the Flower Moon)	Sandra Hüller (Anatomy of a Fall)	Cillian Murphy (Oppenheimer)	Charles Melton (May December)	Paul Giamatti (The Holdovers)	Ryan Gosling (Barbie)	Andrew Scott (All of Us Strangers)	Greta Lee (Past Lives); Jeffrey Wright (American Fiction)	Glenn Howerton (Blackberry); Benoît Magimel (Pacifiction); Koji Yakusho (Perfect Days); Franz Rogowski (Passages)
2024	Marianne Jean-Baptiste (Hard Truths)	Adrien Brody (The Brutalist)	Mikey Madison (Anora)	Demi Moore (The Substance)	Ilinca Manolache (Do Not Expect Too Much from the End of the World)	Nicole Kidman (Babygirl)	Colman Domingo (Sing Sing)	Daniel Craig (Queer)	Lea Seydoux (The Beast)	Fernanda Torres (I'm Still Here); Josh Hartnett (Trap)
2025	Rose Byrne (If I Had Legs I'd Kick You)	Ethan Hawke (Blue Moon)	Wagner Moura (The Secret Agent)	Jessie Buckley (Hamnet )	Timothée Chalamet (Marty Supreme)	Michael B. Jordan (Sinners)	TIE: Benicio Del Toro (One Battle After Another); Sean Penn (One Battle After Another)		Amanda Seyfried (The Testament of Ann Lee)	Renate Reinsve (Sentimental Value)

=== Best Screenplay ===
Year	1st Place	2nd Place	3rd Place	4th Place	5th Place	6th Place	7th Place	8th Place	9th Place	10th Place
2006	The Queen (Peter Morgan)	The Departed (William Monahan)	A Scanner Darkly (Richard Linklater); A Cock and Bull Story (Martin Hardy)		Brick (Rian Johnson)	—N/a				
2007	There Will Be Blood (Paul Thomas Anderson)	Margot at the Wedding (Noah Baumbach)	Michael Clayton (Tony Gilroy)	Zodiac (James Vanderbilt)	No Country for Old Men (Joel and Ethan Coen)	—N/a				
2008	Synecdoche, New York (Charlie Kaufman)	A Christmas Tale (Arnaud Desplechin, Emmanuel Bourdieu)	Rachel Getting Married (Jenny Lumet); Burn After Reading (Joel and Ethan Coen); In Bruges (Martin McDonagh); Happy-Go-Lucky (Mike Leigh)			—N/a				
2009	A Serious Man (Joel and Ethan Coen)	In the Loop (Armando Iannucci, Jesse Armstrong, Tony Roche, Simon Blackwell); Inglourious Basterds (Quentin Tarantino)	Fantastic Mr. Fox (Wes Anderson, Noah Baumbach)	Up in the Air (Jason Reitman, Sheldon Turner)	Duplicity (Tony Gilroy); Police, Adjective (Corneliu Porumboiu)	—N/a				
2010	The Social Network (Aaron Sorkin)	Everybody Else (Maren Ade)	Carlos (Olivier Assayas, Dan Franck)	Another Year (Mike Leigh); The Kids Are All Right (Lisa Cholodenko, Stuart Blumberg)	Mother (Bong Joon-Ho, Eun-kyo Park); Secret Sunshine (Lee Chang-dong)	—N/a				
2011	A Separation (Asghar Farhadi)	Margaret (Kenneth Lonergan)	Moneyball (Steven Zaillian, Aaron Sorkin)	Young Adult (Diablo Cody)	Certified Copy (Abbas Kiarostami); A Dangerous Method (Christopher Hampton); Mysteries of Lisbon (Carlos Saboga)	—N/a				
2012	Lincoln (Tony Kushner)	Zero Dark Thirty (Mark Boal)	The Master (Paul Thomas Anderson)	Moonrise Kingdom (Roman Coppola, Wes Anderson)	Looper (Rian Johnson); Amour (Michael Haneke)	—N/a				
2013	Before Midnight (Richard Linklater, Ethan Hawke, Julie Delpy)	Inside Llewyn Davis (Joel and Ethan Coen)	Her (Spike Jonze)	12 Years a Slave (John Ridley)	Frances Ha (Noah Baumbach)	American Hustle (Eric Warren Singer)	The World's End (Edgar Wright, Simon Pegg)	Computer Chess (Andrew Bujalski)	Nebraska (Bob Nelson)	Blue Jasmine (Woody Allen)
2014	The Grand Budapest Hotel (Wes Anderson, Hugo Guinness)	Boyhood (Richard Linklater)	Inherent Vice (Paul Thomas Anderson)	Listen Up Philip (Alex Ross Perry)	Birdman (Alejandro G. Iñárritu, Alexander Dinelaris, Nicolás Giacobone, Armando Bo)	Gone Girl (Gillian Flynn)	Whiplash (Damien Chazelle)	Force Majure (Ruben Östlund)	Nightcrawler (Dan Gilroy)	Calvary (John Michael McDonagh)
2015	Spotlight (Josh Singer, Tom McCarthy)	Carol (Phyllis Nagy)	Anomalisa (Charlie Kaufman)	Inside Out (Pete Docter, Ronnie del Carmen, Meg LeFauve, Josh Cooley)	Steve Jobs (Aaron Sorkin)	Brooklyn (Nick Hornby)	Ex Machina (Alex Garland)	Mistress America (Noah Baumbach, Greta Gerwig)	45 Years (Andrew Haigh)	Clouds of Sils Maria (Olivier Assayas)
2016	Manchester by the Sea (Kenneth Lonergan)	Moonlight (Barry Jenkins)	Love & Friendship (Whit Stillman)	Hell or High Water (Taylor Sheridan)	The Lobster (Yorgos Lanthimos, Efthimis Filippou)	Arrival (Eric Heisserer)	Toni Erdmann (Maren Ade)	Jackie (Noah Oppenheim)	Paterson (Jim Jarmusch)	La La Land (Damien Chazelle)
2017	Get Out (Jordan Peele)	Lady Bird (Greta Gerwig)	Phantom Thread (Paul Thomas Anderson)	Call Me by Your Name (James Ivory)	Three Billboards Outside Ebbing, Missouri (Martin McDonagh)	—N/a				
2018	The Favourite (Tony McNamara)	First Reformed (Paul Schrader)	Roma (Alfonso Cuarón)	Can You Ever Forgive Me? (Nicole Holofcener, Jeff Whitty)	Burning (Oh Jung-mi, Lee Chang-dong)	—N/a				
2019	Parasite (Bong Joon-ho, Han Jin-won)	Marriage Story (Noah Baumbach)	Once Upon a Time...in Hollywood (Quentin Tarantino)	The Irishman (Steven Zaillian)	Knives Out (Rian Johnson)	Little Woman (Greta Gerwig)	Pain and Glory (Pedro Almodóvar)	Uncut Gems (Josh Safdie, Benny Safdie, Ronald Bronstein)	The Farewell (Lulu Wang)	Portrait of a Lady on Fire (Céline Sciamma)
2020	I'm Thinking of Ending Things (Charlie Kaufman)	First Cow (Jonathan Raymond, Kelly Reichardt)	Never Rarely Sometimes Always (Eliza Hittman)	Promising Young Woman (Emerald Fennell)	Mank (Jack Fincher)	Fourteen (Dan Sallitt)	Minari (Lee Isaac Chung)	The Trial of the Chicago 7 (Aaron Sorkin)	One Night in Miami... (Kemp Powers)	Kajillionaire (Miranda July)
2021	Drive My Car (Ryusuke Hamaguchi, Takamasa Oe)	Licorice Pizza (Paul Thomas Anderson)	The French Dispatch (Wes Anderson)	The Power of the Dog (Jane Campion)	A Hero (Asghar Farhadi)	Wheel of Fortune and Fantasy (Ryusuke Hamaguchi)	The Lost Daughter (Maggie Gyllenhaal)	Pig (Michael Sarnoski, Vanessa Block)	The Worst Person in the World (Eskil Vogt, Joachim Trier)	Berman Island (Mia Hansen-Løve)
2022	Tár (Todd Field)	The Banshees of Inisherin (Martin McDonagh)	Everything Everywhere All at Once (Daniel Kwan and Daniel Scheinert)	Aftersun (Charlotte Wells)	Women Talking (Sarah Polley)	The Fabelmans (Steven Spielberg, Tony Kushner)	Crimes of the Future (David Cronenberg)	Glass Onion: A Knives Out Mystery (Rian Johnson)	Saint Omer (Alice Diop, Amrita David, Marie NDiaye)	The Eternal Daughter – (Joanna Hogg); After Yang – (Kogonada)
2023	May December (Samy Burch, Alex Mechanik)	Past Lives (Celine Song)	Anatomy of a Fall (Justine Triet, Arthur Harari)	The Holdovers (David Hemingson)	American Fiction (Cord Jefferson)	Killers of the Flower Moon (Eric Roth, Martin Scorsese)	Poor Things (Tony McNamara)	Oppenheimer (Christopher Nolan)	Barbie (Greta Gerwig, Noah Baumbach); The Zone of Interest (Jonathan Glazer)	Asteroid City (Wes Anderson, Roman Coppola)
2024	Anora (Sean Baker)	A Real Pain (Jesse Eisenberg)	The Brutalist (Brady Corbet, Mona Fastvold)	Challengers (Justin Kuritzkes)	Conclave (Peter Straughan)	The Substance (Coralie Fargeat)	All We Imagine as Light (Payal Kapadia)	Janet Planet (Annie Baker)	Nickel Boys (RaMell Ross, Joslyn Barnes)	I Saw the TV Glow (Jane Schoenbrun)

=== Best Cinematography ===
Year	1st Place	2nd Place	3rd Place	4th Place	5th Place	6th Place	7th Place	8th Place	9th Place	10th Place
2006	Children of Men (Emmanuel Lubezki)	Pan's Labyrinth (Guillermo Navarro); Three Times (Mark Lee Ping-bing)		Miami Vice (Dion Beebe)	Climates (Gökhan Tiryaki)	—N/a				
2007	There Will Be Blood (Robert Elswit)	The Assassination of Jesse James by the Coward Robert Ford (Roger Deakins)	Zodiac (Harris Savides)	No Country for Old Men (Roger Deakins)	The Diving Bell and the Butterfly (Janusz Kaminski)	—N/a				
Not presented (2008–2010)
2011	The Tree of Life (Emmanuel Lubezki)	Hugo (Robert Richardson)	Drive (Newton Thomas Sigel); Melancholia (Manuel Alberto Claro)	Tinker Tailor Soldier Spy (Hoyte van Hoytema)	Meek's Cutoff (Christopher Blauvelt)	—N/a				
Not presented (2012)
2013	Gravity (Emmanuel Lubezki)	Inside Llewyn Davis (Bruno Delbonnel)	12 Years a Slave (Sean Bobbitt)	To the Wonder (Emmanuel Lubezki)	Spring Breakers (Benoît Debie)	Leviathan (Lucien Castaing-Taylor, Verena Paravel)	Her (Hoyte van Hoytema)	Nebraska (Phedon Papamichael)	The Grandmaster (Philippe Le Sourd)	The Great Beauty (Luca Bigazzi)
2014	Birdman (Emmanuel Lubezki)	Mr. Turner (Dick Pope)	The Grand Budapest Hotel (Robert Yeoman)	The Immigrant (Darius Khondji)	Under the Skin (Daniel Landin)	Ida (Łukasz Żal, Ryszard Lenczewski)	Goodbye to Language (Fabrice Aragno)	Inherent Vice (Robert Elswit)	Interstellar (Hoyte van Hoytema)	Selma (Bradford Young)
2015	Carol (Edward Lachman)	Mad Max: Fury Road (John Seale)	The Assassin (Mark Lee Ping-bing)	The Revenant (Emmanuel Lubezki)	Sicario (Roger Deakins)	Hard to Be a God (Vladimir Ilin, Yuriy Klimenko)	Son of Saul (Mátyás Erdély)	The Hateful Eight (Robert Richardson)	Brooklyn (Yves Bélanger)	The Duke of Burgundy (Nick Knowland)
2016	Moonlight (James Laxton)	La La Land (Linus Sandgren)	Arrival (Bradford Young)	The Handmaiden (Chung Chung-hoon)	Jackie (Stéphane Fontaine)	American Honey (Robbie Ryan)	The Neon Demon (Natasha Braier)	Knight of Cups (Emmanuel Lubezki)	Cameraperson (Kirsten Johnson)	Nocturnal Animals (Seamus McGarvey)
2017	Blade Runner 2049 (Roger Deakins)	Dunkirk (Hoyte van Hoytema)	Phantom Thread (Paul Thomas Anderson)	Call Me by Your Name (Sayombhu Mukdeeprom); The Shape of Water (Dan Laustsen)		—N/a				
2018	Roma (Alfonso Cuarón)	Cold War (Łukasz Żal)	If Beale Street Could Talk (James Laxton)	First Man (Linus Sandgren)	The Favourite (Robbie Ryan)	—N/a				
2019	1917 (Roger Deakins)	Once Upon a Time...in Hollywood (Robert Richardson)	Portrait of a Lady on Fire (Claire Mathon)	The Lighthouse (Jarin Blaschke)	Parasite (Hong Kyung-pyo)	The Irishman (Rodrigo Prieto)	A Hidden Life (Jörg Widmer)	—N/a	—N/a	Uncut Gems (Darius Khondji)
2020	Nomadland (Joshua James Richards)	Mank (Erik Messerschmidt)	Vitalina Varela (Leonardo Simões)	Lovers Rock (Shabier Kirchner)	Never Rarely Sometimes Always (Hélène Louvart)	I'm Thinking of Ending Things (Łukasz Żal)	First Cow (Christopher Blauvelt)	Tenet (Hoyte van Hoytema)	Beanpole (Ksenia Sereda)	The Painted Bird – (Vladimír Smutný); Gunda – (Egil Håskjold Larsen, Viktor Kossakovsky)
2021	The Power of the Dog (Ari Wegner)	Dune (Greig Fraser)	Spencer (Claire Mathon)	The Green Knight (Andrew Droz Palermo)	West Side Story (Janusz Kamiński)	The Tragedy of Macbeth (Bruno Delbonnel)	Memoria (Sayombhu Mukdeeprom)	Passing (Eduard Grau)	The French Dispatch (Robert Yeoman)	Belfast (Haris Zambarloukos)
2022	Decision to Leave (Kim Ji-yong)	Top Gun: Maverick (Claudio Miranda)	EO (Michał Dymek); Nope (Hoyte van Hoytema)		The Fabelmans (Janusz Kamiński)	The Banshees of Inisherin (Ben Davis)	Athena (Matias Boucard)	Avatar: The Way of Water (Russell Carpenter)	Bardo, False Chronicle of a Handful of Truths (Darius Khondji)	Ambulance (Roberto de Angelis)
2023	Oppenheimer (Hoyte van Hoytema)	Poor Things (Robbie Ryan)	Killers of the Flower Moon (Rodrigo Prieto)	The Zone of Interest (Łukasz Żal)	All Dirt Roads Taste of Salt (Jomo Fray)	Barbie (Rodrigo Prieto)	Pacifiction (Artur Tort)	El Conde (Edward Lachman)	Godland (Maria von Hausswolff)	John Wick: Chapter 4 (Dan Laustsen)
2024	Nickel Boys (Jomo Fray)	The Brutalist (Lol Crawley)	Nosferatu (Jarin Blaschke)	All We Imagine as Light (Ranabir Das)	Challengers (Sayombhu Mukdeeprom)	Dune: Part Two (Greig Fraser)	I Saw the TV Glow (Eric K. Yue)	The Girl with the Needle (Michał Dymek)	Inside the Yellow Cocoon Shell (Đinh Duy Hưng)	Conclave (Josée Deshaies)

=== Best International Film ===
Year	1st Place	2nd Place	3rd Place	4th Place	5th Place	6th Place	7th Place	8th Place	9th Place	10th Place
2017	BPM (Beats Per Minute) (France)	Faces Places (France)	The Square (Sweden)	Raw (France)	Thelma (Norway)	—N/a				
2018	Roma (Mexico)	Burning (South Korea)	Shoplifters (Japan)	Cold War (Poland)	Capernaum (Lebanon)	—N/a				
2019	Parasite (South Korea)	Pain and Glory (Spain)	Portrait of a Lady on Fire (France)	Atlantics (France, Senegal)	Transit (Germany)	Monos (Colombia)	Long Day's Journey into Night (China)	An Elephant Sitting Still (China)	Synonyms (Israel, France)	Les Misérables (France)
2020	Bacurau (Brazil)	Beanpole (Russia)	Another Round (Denmark)	Vitalina Varela (Portugal)	Martin Eden (Italy)	Collective (Romania)	Wolfwalkers (Ireland)	And Then We Danced (Georgia, Sweden)	The Painted Bird (Czech Republic)	His House (United Kingdom)
2021	Drive My Car (Japan)	The Worst Person in the World (Norway)	Memoria (Colombia)	Flee (Denmark)	Titane (France)	Wheel of Fortune and Fantasy (Japan)	Bad Luck Banging or Loony Porn (Romania)	What Do We See When We Look at the Sky? (Georgia)	Petite Maman (France)	A Hero (Iran)
2022	Decision to Leave (South Korea)	RRR (India)	EO (Polish)	All Quiet on the Western Front (Germany)	No Bears (Iran)	The Banshees of Inisherin (United Kingdom)	Saint Omer (France)	Happening (France)	Hit the Road (Iran)	Benediction (United Kingdom)
2023	Anatomy of a Fall (France)	The Zone of Interest (United Kingdom)	The Boy and the Heron (Japan)	Perfect Days (Japan)	Fallen Leaves (Finland)	The Taste of Things (France)	Pacifiction (France, Spain)	Godzilla Minus One (Japan)	Afire (Germany)	The Eight Mountains (Italy)
2024	All We Imagine as Light (India)	Do Not Expect Too Much from the End of the World (Romania)	The Seed of the Sacred Fig (Germany, Iran)	Evil Does Not Exist (Japan)	The Beast (France)	Close Your Eyes (Spain)	Flow (Latvia)	No Other Land (Palestine)	Emilia Pérez (France)	Kneecap (Ireland); Red Rooms (Canada)

=== Best Documentary ===
Year	1st Place	2nd Place	3rd Place	4th Place	5th Place	6th Place	7th Place	8th Place	9th Place	10th Place
2006	Iraq in Fragments	The Devil and Daniel Johnston	Our Daily Bread	Deliver Us from Evil	The Case of the Grinning Cat	—N/a				
2007	No End in Sight	Into Great Silence	The King of Kong; Lake of Fire		Manda Bala (Send a Bullet)	—N/a				
2008	Man on Wire	My Winnipeg	Standard Operating Procedure	Trouble the Water	Waltz with Bashir	—N/a				
2009	Anvil! The Story of Anvil	The Beaches of Agnès	The Cove	La Danse; Of Time and the City	24 City	—N/a				
2010	Exit Through the Gift Shop	Sweetgrass	Last Train Home	Inside Job; The Oath	Marwencol	—N/a				
2011	The Interrupters	Nostalgia for the Light	The Arbor	The Autobiography of Nicolae Ceaușescu	Project Nim	—N/a				
2012	This Is Not a Film	The Imposter	How to Survive a Plague	Room 237	The Central Park Five; The Gatekeepers; Jiro Dreams of Sushi; Searching for Sugar Man	—N/a				
2013	The Act of Killing	Stories We Tell	Leviathan	At Berkeley	Blackfish	Let the Fire Burn	Room 237	Cutie and the Boxer	After Tiller	La Camioneta
2014	Citizenfour	Life Itself	The Overnighters	Manakamana	Actress	National Gallery	Jodorowsky's Dune	The Missing Picture	Finding Vivian Maier	Tales of the Grim Sleeper
2015	The Look of Silence	Amy	In Jackson Heights	Listen to Me Marlon	Heart of a Dog	Going Clear	Kurt Cobain: Montage of Heck	Best of Enemies	Cartel Land	Iris
2016	O.J.: Made in America	Cameraperson	I Am Not Your Negro	13th	Weiner	Fire at Sea	Tower	Kate Plays Christine	De Palma	No Home Movie
2017	Faces Places	Dawson City: Frozen Time	Ex Libris – The New York Public Library	Kedi	Jane; Rat Film	—N/a				
2018	Minding the Gap	Won’t You Be My Neighbor?	Three Identical Strangers	Free Solo	Hale County This Morning, This Evening	—N/a				
2019	Apollo 11	American Factory	Honeyland	For Sama	One Child Nation	Varda by Agnès	Amazing Grace	Rolling Thunder Revue: A Bob Dylan Story	Hail Satan?	Diego Maradona
2020	Dick Johnson Is Dead	Time	Collective	City Hall	The Painter and the Thief	Bloody Nose, Empty Pockets	76 Days	The Social Dilemma	The Mole Agent	Totally Under Control
2021	Flee	Summer of Soul	Procession	The Velvet Underground	The Rescue	The Beatles: Get Back	Her Socialist Smile	All Light, Everywhere	The Sparks Brothers	Val; Attica
2022	All the Beauty and the Bloodshed	Fire of Love	Moonage Daydream	All That Breathes	Descendant	Navalny	Three Minutes: A Lengthening	The Janes	Mr. Bachmann and His Class	"Sr."; We Need to Talk About Cosby
2023	Kokomo City	Menus-Plaisirs – Les Troisgros	20 Days in Mariupol	De Humani Corporis Fabrica	Four Daughters; The Eternal Memory	Our Body	Beyond Utopia	A Still Small Voice	The Mission	Still: A Michael J. Fox Movie

=== Best First Feature ===
Year	1st Place	2nd Place	3rd Place	4th Place	5th Place	6th Place	7th Place	8th Place	9th Place	10th Place
2006	Brick	4	Little Miss Sunshine	The Puffy Chair; Man Push Cart		—N/a				
2007	Away from Her	Gone Baby Gone	Control; In Between Days		Persepolis	—N/a				
2008	Ballast	Hunger	Frozen River	Synecdoche, New York	Reprise	—N/a				
2009	Hunger	In the Loop	The Messenger	Afterschool; District 9 Munyurangabo	Medicine for Melancholy; A Single Man; Tulpan	—N/a				
2010	Exit Through the Gift Shop	Animal Kingdom	Tiny Furniture	Night Catches Us	Four Lions	—N/a				
2011	Martha Marcy May Marlene	Margin Call	Attack the Block	Bellflower	Pariah	—N/a				
2012	Beasts of the Southern Wild	Neighboring Sounds	How to Survive a Plague	Safety Not Guaranteed	Only the Young; The Cabin in the Woods	—N/a				
2013	Fruitvale Station	Wadjda	In a World...	Blue Caprice	The Act of Killing	Don Jon	Sun Don't Shine	Fill the Void	This Is the End	Gimme the Loot
2014	The Babadook	Nightcrawler	A Girl Walks Home Alone at Night	Obvious Child	Dear White People	Das merkwürdige Kätzchen	It Felt Like Love	Manakamana	John Wick	Coherence
2015	Son of Saul	The Diary of a Teenage Girl	Ex Machina	The Mend	James White (Josh Mond)	Mustang	The Tribe	Slow West	Approaching the Elephant	Bone Tomahawk
2016	The Witch	Krisha	The Edge of Seventeen	Swiss Army Man	Indignation; Kali Blues		Weiner	Under the Shadow; The Eyes of My Mother		Cameraperson
2017	Get Out	Columbus	Rat Film	Lady Macbeth	Raw; Wind River	—N/a				
2018	Sorry to Bother You	Eighth Grade	Hereditary	A Star Is Born	Minding the Gap	—N/a				
2019	Atlantics	Booksmart	The Last Black Man in San Francisco	An Elephant Sitting Still	Les Misérables	I Lost My Body	The Mustang	The Chambermaid	Burning Cane	End of the Century
2020	Promising Young Woman	The Vast of Night	The 40-Year-Old Version	One Night in Miami...	Relic	Sound of Metal	The Assistant	Ham on Rye	Babyteeth	The Climb
2021	The Lost Daughter	Passing	Pig	Shiva Baby	Summer of Soul	El Planeta	Test Pattern	Beginning	tick, tick... BOOM!	Identifying Features
2022	Aftersun	Saint Omer	Turning Red	Nanny	Murina	Hit the Road	Emily the Criminal	We're All Going to the World's Fair	The Inspection	Three Minutes: A Lengthening
2023	Past Lives	All Dirt Roads Taste of Salt	A Thousand and One	American Fiction	The Settlers	—N/a				
2024	Janet Planet	Good One	The People's Joker	Dìdi; Inside the Yellow Cocoon Shell	Blink Twice	—N/a				

=== Films Opening Next Year ===
Year	1st Place	2nd Place	3rd Place	4th Place	5th Place
2018	High Life	Transit	Birds of Passage	Her Smell; Everybody Knows; In Fabric	
Not presented (2019)
2020	New Order	Pieces of a Woman	Beginning	Nine Days	The Killing of Two Lovers
2021	Benediction	Hit the Road	Happening	We're All Going to the World's Fair	On the Count of Three; In Front of Your Face
2022	Showing Up	Godland	Close	De Humani Corporis Fabrica	Pacifiction
2023	Hit Man	The Bikeriders	The Beast	Evil Does Not Exist	Green Border
2024	Caught by the Tides	On Becoming a Guinea Fowl	Presence; April; Misericordia	The Shrouds	Eephus

== Discontinued categories and special awards ==
=== Best Supporting Performance ===
Year	1st Place	2nd Place	3rd Place	4th Place	5th Place	6th Place	7th Place	8th Place	9th Place	10th Place
2006	Mark Wahlberg (The Departed)	Shareeka Epps (Half Nelson)	Robert Downey Jr. (A Scanner Darkly)	Jackie Earle Haley (Little Children)	Nick Nolte (Clean)	Luminița Gheorghiu (The Death of Mr. Lazarescu)	Sergi López (Pan's Labyrinth)	Meryl Streep (A Prairie Home Companion)	Michael Sheen (The Queen)	Rinko Kikuchi (Babel)
2007	Cate Blanchett (I'm Not There)	Javier Bardem (No Country for Old Men)	Casey Affleck (The Assassination of Jesse James by the Coward Robert Ford)	Paul Dano (There Will Be Blood)	Amy Ryan (Gone Baby Gone)	Hal Holbrook (Into the Wild)	Tilda Swinton (Michael Clayton)	Robert Downey Jr. (Zodiac)	Jennifer Jason Leigh (Margot at the Wedding)	Tommy Lee Jones (No Country for Old Men)
2008	Heath Ledger (The Dark Knight)	Eddie Marsan (Happy-Go-Lucky)	Samantha Morton (Synecdoche, New York)	Josh Brolin (Milk)	Michael Shannon (Revolutionary Road)	Rosemarie DeWitt (Rachel Getting Married)	Robert Downey Jr. (Tropic Thunder)	Penélope Cruz (Vicky Cristina Barcelona)	Marisa Tomei (The Wrestler)	Viola Davis (Doubt)
2009	Christoph Waltz (Inglourious Basterds)	Mo'Nique (Precious)	Christian McKay (Me and Orson Welles)	Woody Harrelson (The Messenger)	Paul Schneider (Bright Star)	Mélanie Laurent (Inglourious Basterds)	Peter Capaldi (In the Loop)	Anna Kendrick (Up in the Air)	Vera Farmiga (Up in the Air)	Stanley Tucci (Julie & Julia)
2010	John Hawkes (Winter's Bone)	Christian Bale (The Fighter)	Michael Fassbender (Fish Tank)	Jacki Weaver (Animal Kingdom)	Mark Ruffalo (The Kids Are All Right)	Greta Gerwig (Greenberg)	Andrew Garfield (The Social Network)	Geoffrey Rush (The King's Speech); Olivia Williams (The Ghost Writer)	Lesley Manville (Another Year)	Melissa Leo (The Fighter)
2011	Christopher Plummer (Beginners)	Albert Brooks (Drive)	Jeannie Berlin (Margaret)	Jessica Chastain (Take Shelter)	Viggo Mortensen (A Dangerous Method)	Carey Mulligan (Shame)	Shailene Woodley (The Descendants)	Melissa McCarthy (Bridesmaids)	John Hawkes (Martha Marcy May Marlene)	J. Smith-Cameron (Margaret)
2012	Philip Seymour Hoffman (The Master)	Matthew McConaughey (Magic Mike)	Tommy Lee Jones (Lincoln)	Amy Adams (The Master)	Anne Hathaway (Les Misérables)	Christoph Waltz (Django Unchained)	Ann Dowd (Compliance)	Samuel L. Jackson (Django Unchained)	Jason Clarke (Zero Dark Thirty)	Robert De Niro (Silver Linings Playbook)
2013	Lupita Nyong'o (12 Years a Slave)	James Franco (Spring Breakers)	Michael Fassbender (12 Years a Slave)	Jared Leto (Dallas Buyers Club)	Léa Seydoux (Blue Is the Warmest Colour)	Jennifer Lawrence (American Hustle)	James Gandolfini (Enough Said)	June Squibb (Nebraska)	Barkhad Abdi (Captain Phillips)	Scarlett Johansson (Her)
2014
2014	Best Supporting Actor									
2014	J. K. Simmons (Whiplash)	Edward Norton (Birdman)	Ethan Hawke (Boyhood)	Josh Brolin (Inherent Vice)	Mark Ruffalo (Foxcatcher)	Jonathan Pryce (Listen Up Philip)	Tyler Perry (Tyler Perry)	Riz Ahmed (Nightcrawler)	Patrick d'Assumçao (Stranger by the Lake)	Steve Carell (Foxcatcher)
2014	Best Supporting Actress									
2014	Patricia Arquette (Boyhood)	Tilda Swinton (Snowpiercer)	Elisabeth Moss (Listen Up Philip)	Emma Stone (Birdman)	Agata Kulesza (Ida)	Carrie Coon (Gone Girl)	Jessica Chastain (A Most Violent Year)	Katherine Waterston (Inherent Vice)	Rene Russo (Inherent Vice)	Laura Dern (Wild)
2015
2015	Best Supporting Actor									
2015	Mark Rylance (Bridge of Spies)	Sylvester Stallone (Creed)	Oscar Isaac (Ex Machina)	Benicio del Toro (Sicario)	Michael Shannon (99 Homes)	Mark Ruffalo (Spotlight)	Paul Dano (Love & Mercy)	Idris Elba (Beasts of No Nation)	Emory Cohen (Brooklyn)	Richard Jenkins (Bone Tomahawk)
2015	Best Supporting Actress									
2015	Kristen Stewart (Clouds of Sils Maria)	Alicia Vikander (Ex Machina)	Cynthia Nixon (James White)	Jennifer Jason Leigh (The Hateful Eight)	Kate Winslet (Steve Jobs)	Rooney Mara (Carol)	Mya Taylor (Tangerine)	Jennifer Jason Leigh (Anomalisa)	Elizabeth Banks (Love & Mercy)	Tessa Thompson (Creed)
2016
2016	Best Supporting Actor									
2016	Mahershala Ali (Moonlight)	Alden Ehrenreich (Hail, Caesar!)	Lucas Hedges (Manchester by the Sea)	Jeff Bridges (Hell or High Water)	Trevante Rhodes (Moonlight)	Ralph Fiennes (A Bigger Splash)	Tom Bennett (Love & Friendship)	André Holland (Moonlight)	Michael Shannon (Nocturnal Animals)	John Goodman (10 Cloverfield Lane)
2016	Best Supporting Actress									
2016	Lily Gladstone (Certain Women)	Michelle Williams (Manchester by the Sea)	Naomie Harris (Moonlight)	Viola Davis (Fences)	Tilda Swinton (A Bigger Splash)	Greta Gerwig (20th Century Women)	Kate McKinnon (Ghostbusters)	Kristen Stewart (Certain Women)	Janelle Monáe (Hidden Figures)	Hayley Squires (I, Daniel Blake)
2017
2017	Best Supporting Actor									
2017	Willem Dafoe (The Florida Project)	Sam Rockwell (Three Billboards Outside Ebbing, Missouri)	Armie Hammer (Call Me by Your Name)	Michael Stuhlbarg (Call Me by Your Name)	Jason Mitchell (Mudbound)	—N/a				
2017	Best Supporting Actress									
2017	Laurie Metcalf (Lady Bird)	Tiffany Haddish (Girls Trip)	Allison Janney (I, Tonya)	Lesley Manville (Phantom Thread)	Holly Hunter (The Big Sick); Michelle Pfeiffer (Mother!)	—N/a				
2018
2018	Best Supporting Actor									
2018	Steven Yeun (Burning)	Richard E. Grant (Can You Ever Forgive Me?)	Hugh Grant (Paddington 2)	Adam Driver (BlacKkKlansman)	Sam Elliott (A Star Is Born)	—N/a				
2018	Best Supporting Actress									
2018	Rachel Weisz (The Favourite)	Regina King (If Beale Street Could Talk)	Emma Stone (The Favourite)	Elizabeth Debicki (Widows)	Thomasin McKenzie (Leave No Trace)	—N/a				
2019
2019	Best Supporting Actor									
2019	Joe Pesci (The Irishman)	Brad Pitt (Once Upon a Time...in Hollywood)	Al Pacino (The Irishman)	Willem Dafoe (The Lighthouse)	Song Kang-ho (Parasite)	Tom Hanks (A Beautiful Day in the Neighborhood)	Alan Alda (Marriage Story)	Tom Burke (The Souvenir)	Shia LaBeouf (Honey Boy)	Wesley Snipes (Dolemite Is My Name)
2019	Best Supporting Actress									
2019	Laura Dern (Marriage Story)	Jennifer Lopez (Hustlers)	Florence Pugh (Little Women)	Zhao Schuzhen (The Farewell)	Margot Robbie (Once Upon a Time...in Hollywood)	Da'Vine Joy Randolph (Dolemite Is My Name)	Julia Fox (Uncut Gems)	Annette Bening (The Report)	Scarlett Johansson (Jojo Rabbit)	Park So-dam (Parasite)

=== Best Undistributed Film ===
Year	1st Place	2nd Place	3rd Place	4th Place	5th Place	6th Place	7th Place	8th Place	9th Place	10th Place
2006	Woman on the Beach	Still Life	Colossal Youth	In Between Days	Private Fears in Public Places	—N/a				
2007	Secret Sunshine	Useless	In the City of Sylvia; The Romance of Astrea and Celadon	The Man from London; Profit Motive and the Whispering Wind	La France	—N/a				
2008	The Headless Woman	Night and Day	Tony Manero	Birdsong	24 City; 35 Shots of Rum; United Red Army	—N/a				
2009	Trash Humpers	To Die like a Man	Eccentricities of a Blonde-Haired Girl; Guy and Madeline on a Park Bench; Change Nothing	Ghost Town; White Material	Life During Wartime; You Won't Miss Me	—N/a				
2010	The Autobiography of Nicolae Ceaușescu; Film Socialisme	Mysteries of Lisbon	Oki's Movie	Black Venus; Tabloid	On Tour	—N/a				
2011	The Color Wheel	Green	Oslo, August 31st Sleeping Sickness	Policeman; Without	Two Years at Sea	—N/a				
2012	Sun Don't Shine	Our Children	Everybody in Our Family	Memories Look at Me	Tiger Tail in Blue	Gebo and the Shadow	The Final Member	Thursday Till Sunday	Twilight Portrait	Three Sisters
2013	Stray Dogs	Closed Curtain	Nobody's Daughter Haewon	Das merkwürdige Kätzchen	What Now? Remind Me	Abuse of Weakness	A Spell to Ward Off the Darkness	Tom at the Farm	Vic and Flo Saw a Bear	Our Sunhi
2014	Hill of Freedom	Journey to the West	The Wonders	From What Is Before	Blind	Approaching the Elephant	The Kindergarten Teacher	Pasolini	The Keeping Room	Stray Dog
2015	Chevalier	Right Now, Wrong Then	In Transit	One Floor Below	The Sky Trembles and the Earth Is Afraid and the Two Eyes Are Not Brothers	88:88	The Movement	The Brand New Testament	Lost and Beautiful	Cosmos
2016	Sieranevada	Nocturama	My Entire High School Sinking Into the Sea	Hermia & Helena	Yourself and Yours	Una	The Lure	Austerlitz	Prevenge	Dark Night
2017	Bodied	Spoor	Wajib	Caniba	Mrs. Fang; Mrs. Hyde	—N/a				
2018	Black Mother	Donbass	The Grand Bizarre	American Dharma	La Flor	—N/a				

=== Best Original Score or Soundtrack ===
Year	1st Place	2nd Place	3rd Place	4th Place	5th Place	6th Place	7th Place	8th Place	9th Place	10th Place
2012	The Master (Jonny Greenwood)	Beasts of the Southern Wild (Dan Romer, Benh Zeitlin)	Moonrise Kingdom (Alexandre Desplat)	Django Unchained	The Turin Horse (Mihály Víg); Zero Dark Thirty (Alexandre Desplat)	—N/a				
2013	Inside Llewyn Davis (T Bone Burnett)	Spring Breakers (Skrillex, Cliff Martinez)	Upstream Color (Shane Carruth)	12 Years a Slave (Hans Zimmer)	Her (Arcade Fire, Owen Pallett)	Gravity (Steven Price)	Bastards (Stuart A. Staples)	American Hustle (Danny Elfman)	Ain't Them Bodies Saints (Daniel Hart)	Frozen (Christophe Beck)
2014	Under the Skin (Mica Levi)	The Grand Budapest Hotel (Alexandre Desplat)	Inherent Vice (Jonny Greenwood)	Gone Girl (Trent Reznor, Atticus Ross)	Birdman (Antonio Sánchez)	Interstellar (Hans Zimmer)	Whiplash (Justin Hurwitz)	Only Lovers Left Alive (Jim Jarmusch, Carter Logan, Shane Stoneback, Jozef van Wissem)	Boyhood	Guardians of the Galaxy (Tyler Bates)
2015	Carol (Carter Burwell)	The Hateful Eight (Ennio Morricone)	Mad Max: Fury Road (Tom Holkenborg)	It Follows (Disasterpeace)	Sicario (Jóhann Jóhannsson)	The Duke of Burgundy (Faris Badwan, Rachel Zeffira)	The Revenant (Ryuichi Sakamoto, Bryce Dessner, Alva Noto)	Love & Mercy (Atticus Ross)	Inside Out (Michael Giacchino)	Creed (Ludwig Göransson)
2016	Jackie (Mica Levi)	La La Land (Justin Hurwitz)	Moonlight (Nicholas Britell)	Arrival (Jóhann Jóhannsson)	The Neon Demon (Cliff Martinez)	Sing Street	The Childhood of a Leader (Scott Walker)	American Honey; The Handmaiden (Yeong-wook Jo)		The Fits (Danny Bensi, Saunder Jurriaans)

=== Best Editing ===
Year	1st Place	2nd Place	3rd Place	4th Place	5th Place	6th Place	7th Place	8th Place	9th Place	10th Place
2014	Boyhood (Sandra Adair)	Whiplash (Tom Cross)	Birdman (Stephen Mirrione, Douglas Crise)	The Grand Budapest Hotel (Barney Pilling)	Gone Girl (Kirk Baxter)	Under the Skin (Paul Watts)	Goodbye to Language (Jean-Luc Godard)	Edge of Tomorrow (James Herbert, Laura Jennings)	Snowpiercer (Steve M. Choe, Kim Chang-ju)	Inherent Vice (Leslie Jones)
2015	Mad Max: Fury Road (Margaret Sixel)	Carol (Affonso Gonçalves)	Spotlight (Tom McArdle)	Sicario (Joe Walker)	The Big Short (Hank Corwin)	Steve Jobs (Elliot Graham)	The Forbidden Room (John Gurdebeke)	Creed (Claudia Castello, Michael Shawver)	The Assassin (Paulie Chih-Chia Huang)	The Mend (Joseph Krings)
2016	Moonlight (Nat Sanders, Joi McMillon)	O.J.: Made in America (Bret Granato, Maya Mumma, Ben Sozanski)	La La Land (Tom Cross)	Cameraperson (Nels Bangerter)	Jackie (Sebastián Sepúlveda)	Manchester by the Sea (Jennifer Lame)	Arrival (Joe Walker)	The Handmaiden (Jae-Bum Kim, Sang-beom Kim)	I Am Not Your Negro (Alexandra Strauss)	Nocturnal Animals (Joan Sobel)

=== Best Animated Film ===
Year	1st Place	2nd Place	3rd Place	4th Place	5th Place
2017	Coco	The Breadwinner	Loving Vincent	The Lego Batman Movie	My Entire High School Sinking Into the Sea

=== Most Anticipated Film ===
Year	1st Place	2nd Place	3rd Place	4th Place	5th Place	6th Place	7th Place	8th Place	9th Place	10th Place
2015	The Witch	The Lobster	Green Room	No Home Movie	Cemetery of Splendour	My Golden Days	Knight of Cups	The Treasure	Embrace of the Serpent	Krisha
2016	Blade Runner 2049	Star Wars: The Last Jedi	Dunkirk	Phantom Thread	Baby Driver	John Wick: Chapter 2	Alien: Covenant	The Beguiled	Wonder Woman	The Lost City of Z

=== Best Film of the Decade ===
Year	1st Place	2nd Place	3rd Place	4th Place	5th Place	6th Place	7th Place	8th Place	9th Place	10th Place
2009	Mulholland Drive (2001)	In the Mood for Love (2000)	Yi Yi (2000)	There Will Be Blood (2007)	Eternal Sunshine of the Spotless Mind (2004)	The New World (2005)	Before Sunset (2004)	Zodiac (2007)	Platform (2000)	A.I. Artificial Intelligence (2001)

=== Best Ensemble ===
Year	1st Place	2nd Place	3rd Place	4th Place	5th Place	6th Place	7th Place	8th Place	9th Place	10th Place
2011	Margaret	Bridesmaids	A Separation; Tinker Tailor Soldier Spy	Margin Call	The Descendants; House of Tolerance; Melancholia; Midnight in Paris	—N/a				
2012	Moonrise Kingdom	Lincoln	The Master; Silver Linings Playbook		Argo; Django Unchained	—N/a				
2013	12 Years a Slave	American Hustle	Inside Llewyn Davis	Nebraska	The World's End	Computer Chess	Short Term 12	Before Midnight	August: Osage County	Blue Jasmine

=== Best Overlooked Film ===
Year	1st Place	2nd Place	3rd Place	4th Place	5th Place	6th Place	7th Place	8th Place	9th Place	10th Place
2016	The Fits	Always Shine	Happy Hour	Krisha	Evolution	Embrace of the Serpent	Chevalier	Little Men	Sand Storm	Sunset Song
