= Globe discography =

Discography of Japanese band Globe

The discography of Japanese electronic pop band Globe includes studio, compilation and remix albums, an extended play, box sets, singles and video albums. The group's self-titled 1996 debut album sold more than four million copies in Japan, while the single "Departures" sold more than two million copies.

== Albums ==
=== Studio albums ===
Title	Album details	Peak chart positions	Sales	Certifications
Title	Album details	JPN	Sales	Certifications
Globe	Released: March 31, 1996; Label: Avex Globe; Formats: CD, digital download, streaming	1	JPN: 4,135,000	RIAJ (phy.): 4x Million
Faces Places	Released: March 12, 1997; Label: Avex Globe; Formats: CD, digital download, streaming	1	JPN: 3,240,000	RIAJ (phy.): 3x Million
Love Again	Released: March 31, 1998; Label: Avex Globe; Formats: CD, digital download, streaming	1	JPN: 1,650,000	RIAJ (phy.): 2x Million
Relation	Released: December 9, 1998; Label: Avex Globe; Formats: CD, digital download, streaming	1	JPN: 1,730,000	RIAJ (phy.): 2x Million
Outernet	Released: March 28, 2001; Label: Avex Globe; Formats: CD, digital download, streaming	9	JPN: 150,000	RIAJ (phy.): Gold
Lights	Released: February 6, 2002; Label: Avex Globe; Formats: CD, digital download, streaming	2	JPN: 270,000	RIAJ (phy.): Gold
Lights 2	Released: April 7, 2002; Label: Avex Globe; Formats: CD, digital download, streaming	2	JPN: 165,000	RIAJ (phy.): Gold
Level 4	Released: March 26, 2003; Label: Avex Globe; Formats: CD, digital download, streaming	17	JPN: 50,000	RIAJ (phy.): Gold
Globe 2 Pop/Rock	Released: August 10, 2005; Label: Avex Globe; Formats: CD, digital download, streaming	5	JPN: 50,000	
Maniac	Released: March 23, 2006; Label: Avex Globe; Formats: CD, digital download, streaming	12	JPN: 30,000	

=== Extended plays ===
Title	Album details	Peak chart positions	Sales
Title	Album details	JPN	Sales
New Deal	Released: August 9, 2006; Label: Avex Globe; Formats: CD, digital download, streaming	20	JPN: 14,000

=== Compilation albums ===
Title	Album details	Peak chart positions	Sales	Certifications
Title	Album details	JPN	Sales	Certifications
Cruise Record 1995-2000	Type: Greatest hits album; Released: September 22, 1999; Label: Avex Globe; Formats: CD, digital download, streaming	1	JPN: 2,760,000	RIAJ (phy.): 2x Million
8 Years: Many Classic Moments	Type: Greatest hits album; Released: November 27, 2002; Label: Avex Globe; Formats: CD, DVD-Audio, digital download, streaming	2	JPN: 290,000	RIAJ (phy.): Platinum
Ballads & Memories	Type: Ballad compilation; Released: December 26, 2002; Label: Avex Globe; Formats: CD, digital download, streaming	13	JPN: 60,000	
Globe Decade: Single History 1995-2004	Type: Singles compilation; Released: February 16, 2005; Label: Avex Globe; Formats: CD, digital download, streaming	8	JPN: 50,000	
15 Years: Best Hit Selection	Type: Greatest hits album; Released: September 29, 2010; Label: Avex Globe; Formats: CD, digital download, streaming	19	JPN: 15,000	RIAJ (dig.): Gold
15 Years: TK Selection	Type: Greatest hits album; Released: September 29, 2010; Label: Avex Globe; Formats: CD, digital download, streaming	38	JPN: 3,000	
#Globe20th: Special Cover Best	Type: Tribute album; Released: December 16, 2015; Label: Avex Globe; Formats: CD, digital download, streaming	8	JPN: 20,000	
All Singles & Other Best 30 Selection	Type: Singles compilation; Released: August 9, 2025; Label: Avex Globe; Formats: CD, digital download, streaming	18	JPN: 5,000	

=== Remix albums ===
Title	Album details	Peak chart positions	Sales	Certifications
Title	Album details	JPN	Sales	Certifications
First Reproducts	Released: March 31, 1999; Label: Avex Globe; Formats: CD, digital download, streaming	4	JPN: 500,000	RIAJ (phy.): Platinum
Super Eurobeat presents Euro Global	Released: August 30, 2000; Label: Avex Globe; Formats: CD, digital download, streaming	3	JPN: 280,000	RIAJ (phy.): Gold
Global Trance	Released: September 12, 2001; Label: Avex Globe; Formats: CD, digital download, streaming	4	JPN: 95,000	
Global Trance 2	Released: September 26, 2002; Label: Avex Globe; Formats: CD, digital download, streaming	22	JPN: 35,000	
Global Trance Best	Released: September 3, 2003; Label: Avex Globe; Formats: CD, digital download, streaming	15	JPN: 20,000	
House of Globe	Released: August 10, 2011; Label: Avex Globe; Formats: CD, digital download, streaming	81	JPN: 1,700	
Ragga Globe: Beautiful Journey	Cover and remix album; Released: August 10, 2011; Label: Avex Trax; Formats: CD, digital download, streaming	225	JPN: 400	
Global EDM Sessions	Released: March 27, 2013; Label: Avex Globe; Formats: CD, digital download, streaming	69	JPN: 2,000	
GDM	Released: February 5, 2014; Label: Avex Globe; Formats: CD, digital download, streaming	59	JPN: 1,000	
Remode 1	Released: August 5, 2015; Label: Avex Globe; Formats: CD, digital download	12	JPN: 8,500	
Deep Jazz Globe	Released: July 27, 2016; Label: Avex Globe; Formats: Digital download, streaming	—		
Remode 2	Released: August 3, 2016; Label: Avex Globe; Formats: CD, digital download, streaming	12	JPN: 5,000	
Globe Non-Stop Best: Essential Songs For You	Released: February 23, 2022; Label: Avex Infinity; Formats: CD, digital download, streaming	36	JPN: 2,500	

=== Box sets ===
Title	Album details	Peak chart positions	Sales
Title	Album details	JPN	Sales
Globe Decade: Complete Box Set 1995-2004	Box set containing twenty-nine singles, nine albums, and nine DVDs.; Released: February 16, 2005; Label: Avex Globe	158	JPN: 1,400
15 Years: Anniversary Box	Box set containing twenty CDs (studio, compilation and remix albums) and thirteen DVDs.; Released: September 29, 2010; Label: Avex Globe	66	JPN: 1,700
15 Years Chronicle: On-Air & Off-Air + Unreleased Tracks	Box set containing six DVDs and one CD.; Released: May 4, 2011; Label: Avex Globe	—	
10000 Days	Box set containing twelve CDs, one Blu-Ray audio disc, and four Blu-ray video discs.; Released: December 24, 2022; Label: Avex Globe	29	JPN: 4,300
Premium Limited 8-cm Single Box	Box set containing Globe's singles on 8-cm CD format.; Released: January 1, 2026; Label: Avex Globe	258	JPN: 200

== Singles ==
=== 1990s ===
List of singles as lead artist
Title	Year	Peak chart positions	Sales	Certifications	Album
Title	Year	JPN	Sales	Certifications	Album
"Feel Like Dance"	1995	3	JPN: 950,000	RIAJ (phy.): 2× Platinum	Globe
"Joy to the Love (Globe)"	1995	1	JPN: 800,000	RIAJ (phy.): Platinum	Globe
"Sweet Pain"	1995	2	JPN: 900,000	RIAJ (phy.): Platinum	Globe
"Departures"	1996	1	JPN: 2,300,000	RIAJ (phy.): 2x Million; RIAJ (dig.): Gold	Globe
"Freedom"	1996	3	JPN: 480,000	RIAJ (phy.): Platinum	Globe
"Is This Love"	1996	1	JPN: 530,000	RIAJ (phy.): 2× Platinum	Faces Places
"Can't Stop Fallin' in Love"	1996	1	JPN: 1,300,000	RIAJ (phy.): 3× Platinum	Faces Places
"Face"	1997	1	JPN: 1,300,000	RIAJ (phy.): 3× Platinum	Faces Places
"Faces Places"	1997	3	JPN: 400,000	RIAJ (phy.): Platinum	Faces Places
"Anytime Smokin' Cigarette"	1997	6	JPN: 150,000	RIAJ (phy.): Gold	Faces Places
"Wanderin' Destiny"	1997	2	JPN: 800,000	RIAJ (phy.): Million	Love Again
"Love Again"	1998	9	JPN: 190,000	RIAJ (phy.): Gold	Love Again
"Wanna Be a Dreammaker"	1998	1	JPN: 500,000	RIAJ (phy.): Platinum	Relation
"Sa Yo Na Ra"	1998	1	JPN: 470,000	RIAJ (phy.): Platinum	Relation
"Sweet Heart"	1998	1	JPN: 390,000	RIAJ (phy.): Platinum	Relation
"Perfume of Love"	1998	2	JPN: 470,000	RIAJ (phy.): Platinum	Relation
"Miss Your Body"	1999	6	JPN: 100,000	RIAJ (phy.): Gold	First Reproducts
"Still Growin' Up"	1999	4	JPN: 160,000	RIAJ (phy.): Gold	Cruise Record 1995-2000
"Biting Her Nails"	1999	13	JPN: 50,000		Cruise Record 1995-2000
"—" denotes a recording that did not chart or was not released in that territory.

=== 2000s–2010s ===
List of singles as lead artist
Title	Year	Peak chart positions	Sales	Certifications	Album
Title	Year	JPN	Sales	Certifications	Album
"On the Way to You" (feat. Keiko)	2000	5	JPN: 130,000		Outernet
"The Main Lord" (feat. Marc)	2000	15	JPN: 30,000		Outernet
"Throwin' Down in the Double 0" (feat. TK)	2000	10	JPN: 40,000		Outernet
"Tonikaku Mushō ni..."	2000	4	JPN: 130,000		Outernet
"Don't Look Back" / "Like a Prayer"	2000	5	JPN: 100,000		Outernet
"Garden"	2001	19	JPN: 19,000		Outernet
"Try This Shoot"	2001	10	JPN: 75,000		Lights
"Stop! In the Name of Love"	2001	7	JPN: 140,000		Lights
"Genesis of Next"	2001	8	JPN: 95,000		Lights
"Many Classic Moments"	2002	24	JPN: 25,000		Lights
"Over the Rainbow" / "Inspired from Red & Blue"	2002	10	JPN: 25,000		Lights 2
"Dreams from Above" (with Push)	2002	12	JPN: 25,000		Non-album single
"Seize the Light"	2002	8	JPN: 55,000		Level 4
"Tranceformation" (with Push)	2003	—			Non-album single
"Get It On Now" (feat Keiko)	2003	35	JPN: 7,000		Level 4
"Here I Am"	2005	9	JPN: 20,000		Globe 2 Pop/Rock
"They Fight Now" / "Single Walking" / "Self Control"	2011	—			Non-album singles
"—" denotes a recording that did not chart or was not released in that territory.

== Video releases ==
Title	Release date	Format	Catalog number
globe@4_domes 10000 DAYS Remaster Edition	August 9, 2023	Blu-ray	AVXG-72063
globe tour 1999 Relation Remaster Edition	August 28, 2024	Blu-ray	AVXG-72064
preview Another Edition Private Tour house of globe – Yoyogi White Theater 1996.9.27 –	September 27, 2025	Blu-ray	AVXG-72065
globe tour 1998 “Love again” Remaster Edition	August 5, 2026	Blu-ray	AVXG-72066

== See also ==
- List of best-selling music artists in Japan
