= 2016 IndieWire Critics Poll =

- Date: December 19, 2016

Highlights
- Best Film: Moonlight
- Most awards: Moonlight (6)
- Most nominations: Moonlight (10)

The 2016 IndieWire Critics Poll was the eleventh instance of the IndieWire Critics Poll, an annual poll hosted by the website IndieWire to recognize various film-related achievements, including the year's best film, best director, and best score/soundtrack. The winners of the 2016 poll were announced on December 19, 2016.

== Winners and nominees ==
Best Picture	Best Director
1st: Moonlight; 2nd: Manchester by the Sea; 3rd: La La Land; 4th: Toni Erdmann; 5th: O.J.: Made in America; 6th: Paterson; 7th: The Handmaiden; 8th: Arrival; 9th: Hell or High Water; 10th: Jackie	1st: Barry Jenkins – Moonlight; 2nd: Damien Chazelle – La La Land; 3rd: Maren Ade – Toni Erdmann; 4th: Kenneth Lonergan – Manchester by the Sea; 5th: Chan-wook Park – The Handmaiden; 6th: Pablo Larraín – Jackie; 7th: Kelly Reichardt – Certain Women (TIE); 7th: Denis Villeneuve – Arrival (TIE); 9th: Paul Verhoeven – Elle; 10th: Martin Scorsese – Silence
Best Actor	Best Actress
1st: Casey Affleck – Manchester by the Sea as Lee Chandler; 2nd: Adam Driver – Paterson as Paterson; 3rd: Colin Farrell – The Lobster as David; 4th: Peter Simonischek – Toni Erdmann as Winfried Conradi / Toni Erdmann; 5th: Denzel Washington – Fences as Troy Maxson; 6th: Joel Edgerton – Loving as Richard Loving; 7th: Ryan Gosling – La La Land as Sebastian Wilder; 8th: Viggo Mortensen – Captain Fantastic as Ben Cash; 9th: Vincent Lindon – The Measure of a Man as Thierry Taugourdeau; 10th: Ethan Hawke – Born to Be Blue as Chet Baker	1st: Isabelle Huppert – Elle as Michèle Leblanc; 2nd: Natalie Portman – Jackie as Jackie Kennedy; 3rd: Sandra Hüller – Toni Erdmann as Ines Conradi; 4th: Sônia Braga – Aquarius as Doña Clara (TIE); 4th: Emma Stone – La La Land as Mia Dolan (TIE); 6th: Amy Adams – Arrival as Louise Banks; 7th: Rebecca Hall – Christine as Christine Chubbuck; 8th: Ruth Negga – Loving as Mildred Loving; 9th: Annette Bening – 20th Century Women as Dorothea Fields; 10th: Isabelle Huppert – Things to Come as Nathalie Chazeaux
Best Supporting Actor	Best Supporting Actress
1st: Mahershala Ali – Moonlight as Juan; 2nd: Alden Ehrenreich – Hail, Caesar! as Hobie Doyle; 3rd: Lucas Hedges – Manchester by the Sea as Patrick Chandler; 4th: Jeff Bridges – Hell or High Water as Marcus Hamilton; 5th: Trevante Rhodes – Moonlight as Adult Chiron; 6th: Ralph Fiennes – A Bigger Splash as Harry Hawkes; 7th: Tom Bennett – Love & Friendship as Sir James Martin; 8th: André Holland – Moonlight as Adult Kevin; 9th: Michael Shannon – Nocturnal Animals as Carlos Holt; 10th: John Goodman – 10 Cloverfield Lane as Howard Stambler	1st: Lily Gladstone – Certain Women as Jamie; 2nd: Michelle Williams – Manchester by the Sea as Randi; 3rd: Naomie Harris – Moonlight as Paula; 4th: Viola Davis – Fences as Rose Maxson; 5th: Tilda Swinton – A Bigger Splash as Marianne Lane; 6th: Greta Gerwig – 20th Century Women as Abigail "Abbie" Porter; 7th: Kate McKinnon – Ghostbusters as Dr. Jillian "Holtz" Holtzmann; 8th: Kristen Stewart – Certain Women as Beth Travis; 9th: Janelle Monáe – Hidden Figures as Mary Jackson; 10th: Hayley Squires – I, Daniel Blake as Katie Morgan
Best Screenplay	Best Cinematography
1st: Manchester by the Sea – Kenneth Lonergan; 2nd: Moonlight – Barry Jenkins; 3rd: Love & Friendship – Whit Stillman; 4th: Hell or High Water – Taylor Sheridan; 5th: The Lobster – Yorgos Lanthimos and Efthimis Filippou; 6th: Arrival – Eric Heisserer; 7th: Toni Erdmann – Maren Ade; 8th: Jackie – Noah Oppenheim; 9th: Paterson – Jim Jarmusch; 10th: La La Land – Damien Chazelle	1st: Moonlight – James Laxton; 2nd: La La Land – Linus Sandgren; 3rd: Arrival – Bradford Young; 4th: The Handmaiden – Chung Chung-hoon; 5th: Jackie – Stéphane Fontaine; 6th: American Honey – Robbie Ryan; 7th: The Neon Demon – Natasha Braier; 8th: Knight of Cups – Emmanuel Lubezki; 9th: Cameraperson – Kirsten Johnson; 10th: Nocturnal Animals – Seamus McGarvey
Best Editing	Best Original Score or Soundtrack
1st: Moonlight – Nat Sanders and Joi McMillon; 2nd: O.J.: Made in America – Bret Granato, Maya Mumma, Ben Sozanski; 3rd: La La Land – Tom Cross; 4th: Cameraperson – Nels Bangerter; 5th: Jackie – Sebastián Sepúlveda; 6th: Manchester by the Sea – Jennifer Lame; 7th: Arrival – Joe Walker; 8th: The Handmaiden – Jae-Bum Kim, Sang-beom Kim; 9th: I Am Not Your Negro – Alexandra Strauss; 10th: Nocturnal Animals – Joan Sobel	1st: Jackie – Mica Levi; 2nd: La La Land – Justin Hurwitz; 3rd: Moonlight – Nicholas Britell; 4th: Arrival – Jóhann Jóhannsson; 5th: The Neon Demon – Cliff Martinez; 6th: Sing Street; 7th: The Childhood of a Leader – Scott Walker; 8th: American Honey (TIE); 8th: The Handmaiden – Yeong-wook Jo (TIE); 10th: The Fits – Danny Bensi, Saunder Jurriaans
Best Documentary	Best First Feature
1st place: O.J.: Made in America; 2nd place: Cameraperson; 3rd place: I Am Not Your Negro; 4th place: 13th; 5th place: Weiner; 6th place: Fire at Sea; 7th place: Tower; 8th place: Kate Plays Christine; 9th place: De Palma; 10th place: No Home Movie	1st: The Witch – Robert Eggers; 2nd: Krisha – Trey Edward Shults; 3rd: The Edge of Seventeen – Kelly Fremon Craig; 4th: Swiss Army Man – Dan Kwan, Daniel Scheinert; 5th: Indignation – James Schamus (TIE); 5th: Kali Blues – Gan Bi; 7th: Weiner – Josh Kriegman, Elyse Steinberg; 8th: Under the Shadow – Babak Anvari (TIE); 8th: The Eyes of My Mother – Nicolas Pesce (TIE); 10th: Cameraperson – Kirsten Johnson
Most Anticipated of 2017	Best Undistributed Film
1st place: Blade Runner 2049; 2nd place: Star Wars: The Last Jedi; 3rd place: Dunkirk; 4th place: Phantom Thread; 5th place: Baby Driver; 6th place: John Wick: Chapter 2; 7th place: Alien: Covenant; 8th place: The Beguiled; 9th place: Wonder Woman; 10th place: The Lost City of Z	1st place: Sieranevada; 2nd place: Nocturama; 3rd place: My Entire High School Sinking Into the Sea; 4th place: Hermia & Helena; 5th place: Yourself and Yours; 6th place: Una; 7th place: The Lure; 8th place: Austerlitz; 9th place: Prevenge; 10th place: Dark Night
Best Overlooked Film
1st place: The Fits; 2nd place: Always Shine; 3rd place: Happî awâ; 3rd place: Krisha; 5th place: Evolution; 6th place: Embrace of the Serpent; 7th place: Chevalier; 7th place: Little Men; 9th place: Sand Storm; 9th place: Sunset Song

== Multiple nominations and wins ==
=== Multiple nominations ===
Nominations	Films
10	Moonlight
9	La La Land
8	Jackie
7	Arrival
7	Manchester by the Sea
5	The Handmaiden
5	Toni Erdmann
4	Cameraperson
3	Certain Women
3	Hell or High Water
3	Nocturnal Animals
3	O.J.: Made in America
3	Paterson
2	American Honey
2	A Bigger Splash
2	Elle
2	Fences
2	The Fits
2	I Am Not Your Negro
2	Krisha
2	The Lobster
2	Love & Friendship
2	Loving
2	The Neon Demon
2	Weiner

=== Multiple wins ===
Wins	Films
6	Moonlight
