= Oricon Albums Chart =

Japanese music chart

The Oricon Albums Chart is the Japanese music industry standard albums popularity chart issued daily, weekly, monthly and yearly by Oricon. Oricon originally published LP, CT, Cartridge and CD charts prior to the establishment of the Oricon Albums Chart on October 5, 1987. The Oricon Albums Chart's rankings are based on physical albums' sales.

A Digital Albums Chart based on download sales was established on November 19, 2016. On December 24, 2018, Oricon introduced a Combined Albums Chart based on album-equivalent units. It counts physical sales, digital sales and streaming.

Charts are published every Tuesday in Oricon Style and on Oricon's official website. Every Monday, Oricon receives data from outlets, but data on merchandise sold through certain channels does not make it into the charts. For example, the debut single of NEWS, a pop group, was released only through 7-Eleven stores, which are not covered by Oricon, and its sales were not reflected in the Oricon charts. Oricon's rankings of record sales are therefore not completely accurate.

== Best-selling albums of all time ==
Rank	Year	Title	Artist	Sales
1	1999	First Love	Hikaru Utada	7,650,215
2	1998	B'z The Best "Pleasure"	B'z	5,135,922
3	1997	Review	Glay	4,875,980
4	2001	Distance	Hikaru Utada	4,469,135
5	1998	B'z The Best "Treasure"	B'z	4,438,742
6	2001	A Best	Ayumi Hamasaki	4,301,353
7	1996	Globe	Globe	4,136,460
8	2002	Deep River	Hikaru Utada	3,604,588
9	2000	Delicious Way	Mai Kuraki	3,530,000
10	1998	Time to Destination	Every Little Thing	3,520,330

== See also ==
- List of Oricon number-one albums
- Oricon Singles Chart
- List of best-selling singles in Japan
- List of best-selling albums in Japan
