= 2017 IndieWire Critics Poll =

- Date: December 19, 2017

Highlights
- Best Film: Get Out
- Most awards: Get Out (3)

The 2017 IndieWire Critics Poll was the twelfth instance of the IndieWire Critics Poll, an annual poll hosted by the website IndieWire to recognize various film-related achievements, including the year's best film, best director, and best score/soundtrack. The winners of the 2017 IndieWire Critics Poll were announced on December 19, 2017.

== Winners and nominees ==
Best Picture	Best Director
1st: Get Out; 2nd: Lady Bird; 3rd: Dunkirk; 4th: Phantom Thread; 5th: The Florida Project; 6th: The Shape of Water; 7th: Call Me by Your Name; 8th: Personal Shopper; 9th: Three Billboards Outside Ebbing, Missouri; 10th: The Post	1st: Paul Thomas Anderson – Phantom Thread; 2nd: Luca Guadagnino – Call Me by Your Name; 3rd: Greta Gerwig – Lady Bird; 4th: Sean Baker – The Florida Project; 5th: Jordan Peele – Get Out
Best Actor	Best Actress
1st: Timothée Chalamet – Call Me by Your Name; 2nd: Daniel Day-Lewis – Phantom Thread; 3rd: Robert Pattinson – Good Time; 4th: James Franco – The Disaster Artist; 5th: Daniel Kaluuya – Get Out (TIE); 5th: Gary Oldman – Darkest Hour (TIE)	1st: Saoirse Ronan – Lady Bird; 2nd: Frances McDormand – Three Billboards Outside Ebbing, Missouri; 3rd: Cynthia Nixon – A Quiet Passion; 4th: Sally Hawkins – The Shape of Water; 5th: Kristen Stewart – Personal Shopper
Best Supporting Actor	Best Supporting Actress
1st: Willem Dafoe – The Florida Project; 2nd: Sam Rockwell – Three Billboards Outside Ebbing, Missouri; 3rd: Armie Hammer – Call Me by Your Name; 4th: Michael Stuhlbarg – Call Me by Your Name; 5th: Jason Mitchell – Mudbound	1st: Laurie Metcalf – Lady Bird; 2nd: Tiffany Haddish – Girls Trip; 3rd: Allison Janney – I, Tonya; 4th: Lesley Manville – Phantom Thread; 5th: Holly Hunter – The Big Sick (TIE); 5th: Michelle Pfeiffer – Mother! (TIE)
Best Screenplay	Best Cinematography
1st: Get Out; 2nd: Lady Bird; 3rd: Phantom Thread; 4th: Call Me by Your Name; 5th: Three Billboards Outside Ebbing, Missouri	1st: Blade Runner 2049; 2nd: Dunkirk; 3rd: Phantom Thread; 4th: Call Me by Your Name (TIE); 4th: The Shape of Water (TIE)
Best Documentary	Best Debut Feature
1st: Faces Places; 2nd: Dawson City: Frozen Time; 3rd: Ex Libris – The New York Public Library; 4th: Kedi; 5th: Jane (TIE); 5th: Rat Film (TIE); 7th: I Call Him Morgan	1st: Get Out; 2nd: Columbus; 3rd: Rat Film; 4th: Lady Macbeth; 5th: Raw; 5th: Wind River (TIE)
Best Foreign Language Film	Best Animated Films
1st: BPM (Beats Per Minute); 2nd: Faces Places; 3rd: The Square; 4th: Raw; 5th: Thelma	1st: Coco; 2nd: The Breadwinner; 3rd: Loving Vincent; 4th: The Lego Batman Movie; 5th: My Entire High School Sinking Into the Sea
Best Undistributed Film	Best 2018 Movies Already Seen
1st: Bodied; 2nd: Spoor; 3rd: Wajib; 4th: Caniba; 4th: Mrs. Fang (TIE); 4th: Mrs. Hyde (TIE)	1st: Zama; 2nd: The Rider; 3rd: First Reformed; 4th: Lean on Pete; 5th: Sweet Country
