= Isiah Medina =

Canadian filmmaker

- Born: 1991 (age 34–35); Winnipeg, Canada
- Occupations: Director, writer, producer
- Years active: 2010–present

Isiah Medina (born 1991) is a Canadian experimental filmmaker from Winnipeg, Manitoba. He is the founder of the Toronto-based production company Quantity Cinema. Medina is known for his radical approach to intellectual montage and the cut, philosophy (most notably the work of Plato and Alain Badiou), and mathematics. He has been compared to Jean-Luc Godard, Sergei Eisenstein, Gregory Markopoulos, and Hollis Frampton.

Medina's 2015 feature debut 88:88 received a Vancouver Film Critics Circle nomination for Best Director of a Canadian Film at the Vancouver Film Critics Circle Awards 2016) and was listed as one of the best undistributed films of 2015 by Film Comment and Indiewire. 88:88 received widespread critical acclaim and played at the Locarno Film Festival, Toronto International Film Festival, New York Film Festival, Berlin Critics' Week, Mar del Plata International Film Festival, and the Viennale. His other films include Semi-Auto Colours (2010), Time is the Sun (2012), idizwadidiz (2016), log 2 (2020), Inventing the Future (2020) (an adaptation of Inventing the Future: Postcapitalism and a World Without Work), Night Is Limpid (2022), He Thought He Died (2023), and Gangsterism (2025).

His fifth feature, Gangsterism, had its world premiere at Toronto's Paradise Theatre in partnership with the screening series CONTOURS and curator Saffron Maeve.

== Selected filmography ==
- Semi-auto colours (2010)
- Time is the Sun (2012)
- Fare Well (2012)
- Light Buffer (2012)
- B. Outside of a School (2013)
- 88:88 (2015)
- idizwadidiz (2016)
- log 2 (2020)
- Inventing the Future (2020)
- Night is Limpid (2022)
- He Thought He Died (2023)
- Gangsterism (2025)
