= 2019 IndieWire Critics Poll =

- Date: December 16, 2019

Highlights
- Best Film: Parasite
- Most awards: Parasite (4)

The winners of the 2019 IndieWire Critics Poll were announced on December 16, 2019.

== Winners and nominees ==
Best Picture	Best Director
1st: Parasite; 2nd: The Irishman; 3rd: Marriage Story; 4th: Once Upon a Time...in Hollywood; 5th: Portrait of a Lady on Fire; 6th: Pain and Glory; 7th: Uncut Gems; 8th: The Souvenir; 9th: Joker; 10th: Little Women	1st: Bong Joon-ho – Parasite; 2nd: Martin Scorsese – The Irishman; 3rd: Quentin Tarantino – Once Upon a Time... in Hollywood; 4th: Céline Sciamma – Portrait of a Lady on Fire; 5th: Josh Safdie and Benny Safdie – Uncut Gems; 6th: Noah Baumbach – Marriage Story; 7th: Pedro Almodóvar – Pain and Glory; 8th: Greta Gerwig – Little Women; 9th: Joanna Hogg – The Souvenir; 10th: Todd Phillips – Joker
Best Actor	Best Actress
1st: Adam Driver – Marriage Story; 2nd: Antonio Banderas – Pain and Glory; 3rd: Adam Sandler – Uncut Gems; 4th: Joaquin Phoenix – Joker; 5th: Robert De Niro – The Irishman; 6th: Leonardo DiCaprio – Once Upon a Time...in Hollywood; 7th: Eddie Murphy – Dolemite Is My Name; 8th: Taron Egerton – Rocketman; 9th: Song Kang-ho – Parasite; 10th: Brad Pitt – Ad Astra	1st: Lupita Nyong'o – Us; 2nd: Scarlett Johansson – Marriage Story; 3rd: Elisabeth Moss – Her Smell; 4th: Renée Zellweger – Judy; 4th: Awkwafina – The Farewell; 6th: Florence Pugh – Midsommar; 7th: Mary Kay Place – Diane; 8th: Zhao Tao – Ash Is Purest White; 9th: Saoirse Ronan – Little Women; 10th: Adèle Haenel – Portrait of a Lady on Fire
Best Supporting Actor	Best Supporting Actress
1st: Joe Pesci - The Irishman; 2nd: Brad Pitt – Once Upon a Time...in Hollywood; 3rd: Al Pacino – The Irishman; 4th: Willem Dafoe – The Lighthouse; 5th: Song Kang-ho – Parasite; 6th: Tom Hanks – A Beautiful Day in the Neighborhood; 7th: Alan Alda – Marriage Story; 8th: Tom Burke – The Souvenir; 9th: Shia LaBeouf – Honey Boy; 10th: Wesley Snipes – Dolemite Is My Name	1st: Laura Dern – Marriage Story; 2nd: Jennifer Lopez – Hustlers; 3rd: Florence Pugh – Little Women; 4th: Zhao Schuzhen – The Farewell; 5th: Margot Robbie – Once Upon a Time...in Hollywood; 6th: Da'Vine Joy Randolph – Dolemite Is My Name; 7th: Julia Fox – Uncut Gems; 8th: Annette Bening – The Report; 9th: Scarlett Johansson – Jojo Rabbit; 10th: Park So-dam – Parasite
Best Screenplay	Best Cinematography
1st: Parasite – Bong Joon-ho, Han Jin-won; 2nd: Marriage Story - Noah Baumbach; 3rd: Once Upon a Time...in Hollywood - Quentin Tarantino; 4th: The Irishman - Steven Zaillian; 5th: Knives Out - Rian Johnson; 6th: Little Woman - Greta Gerwig; 7th: Pain and Glory - Pedro Almodóvar; 8th: Uncut Gems - Josh Safdie, Benny Safdie, Ronald Bronstein; 9th: The Farewell - Lulu Wang; 10th: Portrait of a Lady on Fire - Céline Sciamma	1st: 1917 - Roger Deakins; 2nd: Once Upon a Time...in Hollywood - Robert Richardson; 3rd: Portrait of a Lady on Fire - Claire Mathon; 4th: The Lighthouse - Jarin Blaschke; 5th: Parasite - Hong Kyung-pyo; 6th: The Irishman - Rodrigo Prieto; 7th: A Hidden Life - Jörg Widmer; 10th: Uncut Gems - Darius Khondji
Best Documentary	Best First Feature
1st: Apollo 11; 2nd: American Factory; 3rd: Honeyland; 4th: For Sama; 5th: One Child Nation; 6th: Varda by Agnes; 7th: Amazing Grace; 8th: Rolling Thunder Revue: A Bob Dylan Story; 9th: Hail Satan?; 10th: Diego Maradona	1st: Atlantics; 2nd: Booksmart; 3rd: The Last Black Man in San Francisco; 4th: An Elephant Sitting Still; 5th: Les Misérables; 6th: I Lost My Body; 7th: The Mustang; 8th: The Chambermaid; 9th: Burning Cane; 10th: End of the Century
Best Foreign Film
1st: Parasite; 2nd: Pain and Glory; 3rd: Portrait of a Lady on Fire; 4th: Atlantics; 5th: Transit; 6th: Monos; 7th: Long Day's Journey into Night; 8th: An Elephant Sitting Still; 9th: Synonyms; 10th: Les Misérables
