= 2015 IndieWire Critics Poll =

- Date: December 14, 2015

Highlights
- Best Film: Mad Max: Fury Road

The winners of the 2015 IndieWire Critics Poll were announced on December 14, 2015.

== Winners and nominees ==
Best Picture	Best Director
1st: Mad Max: Fury Road; 2nd: Carol; 3rd: Spotlight; 4th: Inside Out; 5th: Phoenix; 6th: Brooklyn; 7th: Anomalisa; 8th: The Assassin; 9th: The Look of Silence; 10th: Son of Saul	1st: George Miller – Mad Max: Fury Road; 2nd: Todd Haynes – Carol; 3rd: Hsiao-Hsien Hou – The Assassin; 4th: László Nemes – Son of Saul; 5th: Tom McCarthy – Spotlight; 6th: Alejandro G. Iñárritu – The Revenant; 7th: Christian Petzold – Phoenix; 8th: Charlie Kaufman, Duke Johnson – Anomalisa; 9th: John Crowley – Brooklyn; 10th: Guy Maddin, Evan Johnson – The Forbidden Room
Best Actor	Best Actress
1st: Michael Fassbender – Steve Jobs	1st: Charlotte Rampling – 45 Years
Best Supporting Actor	Best Supporting Actress
1st: Mark Rylance – Bridge of Spies	1st: Kristen Stewart – Clouds of Sils Maria
Best Screenplay	Best Cinematography
1st: Spotlight	1st: Carol; 2nd: Mad Max: Fury Road; 3rd: The Assassin; 4th: The Revenant; 5th: Sicario; 6th: Hard to Be a God; 7th: Son of Saul; 8th: The Hateful Eight; 9th: Brooklyn; 10th: The Duke of Burgundy
Best Documentary	Best Debut Feature
1st: The Look of Silence; 2nd: Amy; 3rd: In Jackson Heights; 4th: Listen to Me Marlon; 5th: Heart of a Dog; 6th: Going Clear: Scientology & the Prison of Belief; 7th: Cobain: Montage of Heck; 8th: Best of Enemies: Buckley vs. Vidal; 9th: Cartel Land; 10th: Iris	1st: Son of Saul
Best Original Score or Soundtrack	Best Editing
1st: Carol	1st: Mad Max: Fury Road
Best Undistributed Film	Most Anticipated of 2016
1st: Chevalier; 2nd: Right Now, Wrong Then; 3rd: In Transit; 4th: One Floor Below; 5th: The Sky Trembles and the Earth Is Afraid and the Two Eyes Are Not Brothers; 6th: 88:88; 7th: The Movement; 8th: The Brand New Testament; 9th: Lost and Beautiful; 10th: Cosmos	1st: The Witch
