= Keiko (musician) =

KEIKO
- Also known as: KCO
- Born: 山田 桂子 (Yamada Keiko); August 18, 1972 (age 54); Usuki, Ōita, Japan
- Genres: Japanese pop; Trance
- Occupation: Singer-songwriter
- Instrument: Vocals
- Years active: 1994–2011 (on hiatus)
- Labels: Avex Globe (as Keiko, 2003–2008 and KCO, 2010–present); Universal Sigma (as KCO, 2008–2010)
- Website: avexnet.or.jp/k-c-o/index.html

Keiko Yamada (山田 桂子, Yamada Keiko; born August 18, 1972) is the lead vocalist of the pop group Globe. Since 2001, she has had a solo career, starting with the single "A Song Is Born" in collaboration with Ayumi Hamasaki. In late 2003, she released her first solo EP called KCO. Keiko, under the name KCO, released her first solo album O-Crazy Luv on Universal in 2008. The album contains a total of 11 tracks, including her first single under the new name, "Haru no Yuki" (Spring Snow).

== Personal life ==
She was born in Usuki, Japan. In November 2002, she married fellow Globe member Tetsuya Komuro.

On October 24, 2011, Keiko was hospitalized and diagnosed with a subarachnoid haemorrhage. She subsequently underwent a five-hour surgery to repair the condition. She entered rehabilitation therapy, with a seemingly good prognosis.

In October 2019, it was reported that Keiko and Tetsuya Komuro were in the process of divorce mediation after revelations a year earlier of an affair with a nurse who was taking care of Keiko during her recovery from surgery. It was also reported that the revelation of this affair also prompted TK's precipitous retirement from the music industry. At this time, they were reportedly separated.

On February 26, 2021, it was announced that a divorce was established with Komuro.

== Discography ==
=== as Keiko ===
- "On the Way to YOU" (2000) (#5 in Japan)
- "A Song is Born" (with Ayumi Hamasaki, 2001) (#1 in Japan)
- "Be True" (with Cyber X) (2003) (#18 in Japan)
- KCO (2003) (#8 in Japan)

=== as KCO ===
- "Haru no Yuki" (春の雪, March 12, 2008)
- O-Crazy Luv (April 30, 2008)
- "Mystic Fawn"
