= 2018 IndieWire Critics Poll =

- Date: December 17, 2018

Highlights
- Best Film: Roma
- Most awards: Roma (4)

The winners of the 2018 IndieWire Critics Poll were announced on December 17, 2018.

== Winners and nominees ==
Best Picture	Best Director
1st: Roma; 2nd: First Reformed; 3rd: Burning; 4th: The Favourite; 5th: Cold War; 6th: Shoplifters; 7th: BlacKkKlansman; 8th: Zama; 9th: You Were Never Really Here; 10th: If Beale Street Could Talk	1st: Alfonso Cuarón – Roma; 2nd: Lee Chang-Dong – Burning; 3rd: Lynne Ramsay – You Were Never Really Here; 4th: Yorgos Lanthimos – The Favourite; 5th: Paul Schrader – First Reformed
Best Actor	Best Actress
1st: Ethan Hawke – First Reformed; 2nd: Joaquin Phoenix – You Were Never Really Here; 3rd: Willem Dafoe – At Eternity’s Gate; 4th: Rami Malek – Bohemian Rhapsody; 5th: Viggo Mortensen – Green Book	1st: Olivia Colman – The Favourite; 2nd: Yalitza Aparicio – Roma; 3rd: Toni Collette – Hereditary; 4th: Joanna Kulig – Cold War; 5th: Melissa McCarthy – Can You Ever Forgive Me?
Best Supporting Actor	Best Supporting Actress
1st: Steven Yeun – Burning; 2nd: Richard E. Grant – Can You Ever Forgive Me?; 3rd: Hugh Grant – Paddington 2; 4th: Adam Driver – BlacKkKlansman; 5th: Sam Elliott – A Star Is Born	1st: Rachel Weisz – The Favourite; 2nd: Regina King – If Beale Street Could Talk; 3rd: Emma Stone – The Favourite; 4th: Elizabeth Debicki – Widows; 5th: Thomasin McKenzie – Leave No Trace
Best Screenplay	Best Cinematography
1st: The Favourite; 2nd: First Reformed; 3rd: Roma; 4th: Can You Ever Forgive Me?; 5th: Burning	1st: Roma; 2nd: Cold War; 3rd: If Beale Street Could Talk; 4th: First Man; 5th: The Favourite
Best Documentary	Best Debut Feature
1st: Minding the Gap; 2nd: Won’t You Be My Neighbor?; 3rd: Three Identical Strangers; 4th: Free Solo; 5th: Hale County This Morning, This Evening	1st: Sorry to Bother You; 2nd: Eighth Grade; 3rd: Hereditary; 4th: A Star Is Born; 5th: Minding the Gap
Best Foreign Language Film	
1st: Roma; 2nd: Burning; 3rd: Shoplifters; 4th: Cold War; 5th: Capernaum
Best Undistributed Film	Best Films Opening in 2019
1st: Black Mother; 2nd: Donbass; 3rd: The Grand Bizarre; 4th: American Dharma; 5th: La Flor	1st: High Life; 2nd: Transit; 3rd: Birds of Passage; 4th: Her Smell (TIE); 4th: Everybody Knows (TIE); 4th: In Fabric (TIE)
