= O-Crazy Luv =

Studio album by KCO
- Released: 30 April 2008
- Genre: Pop
- Length: 56:03
- Label: Universal Sigma
- Producer: Tetsuya Komuro

O-Crazy Luv is Keiko Yamada's first full-length album, and her first album under the name KCO. The album contains a total of 11 tracks including her first solo single as KCO, "Haru no Yuki", and its B-side, "Mobile Emotion". The album comes in two editions, normal and limited edition. Both have alternate album covers which only differ slightly. The limited edition is packaged with a DVD containing the PV for "Haru no Yuki" and offshoot footage. Despite being a track on the album, the PV for "O-Crazy Luv" was not included in the DVD. It became available for download via iTunes. All songs featured in the album were produced by Tetsuya Komuro.

== Track listing ==
Track	Title	Length
01	Selfish	5:57
02	Haru no Yuki -Full Length- (春の雪-FULL LENGTH-)	6:48
03	Slide	5:11
04	Secret Comes	4:56
05	O-Crazy Luv	6:11
06	Hello UK	4:47
07	Sorry Lonely	3:57
08	Self Indication	3:59
09	Nemurasete (ネムラセテ)	4:55
10	Last Dance	5:00
11	Mobile Emotion	4:22

== Singles ==
- "Haru no Yuki" Release: 2008 March 12
