= Pietro Marcello =

Italian film director (born 1976)

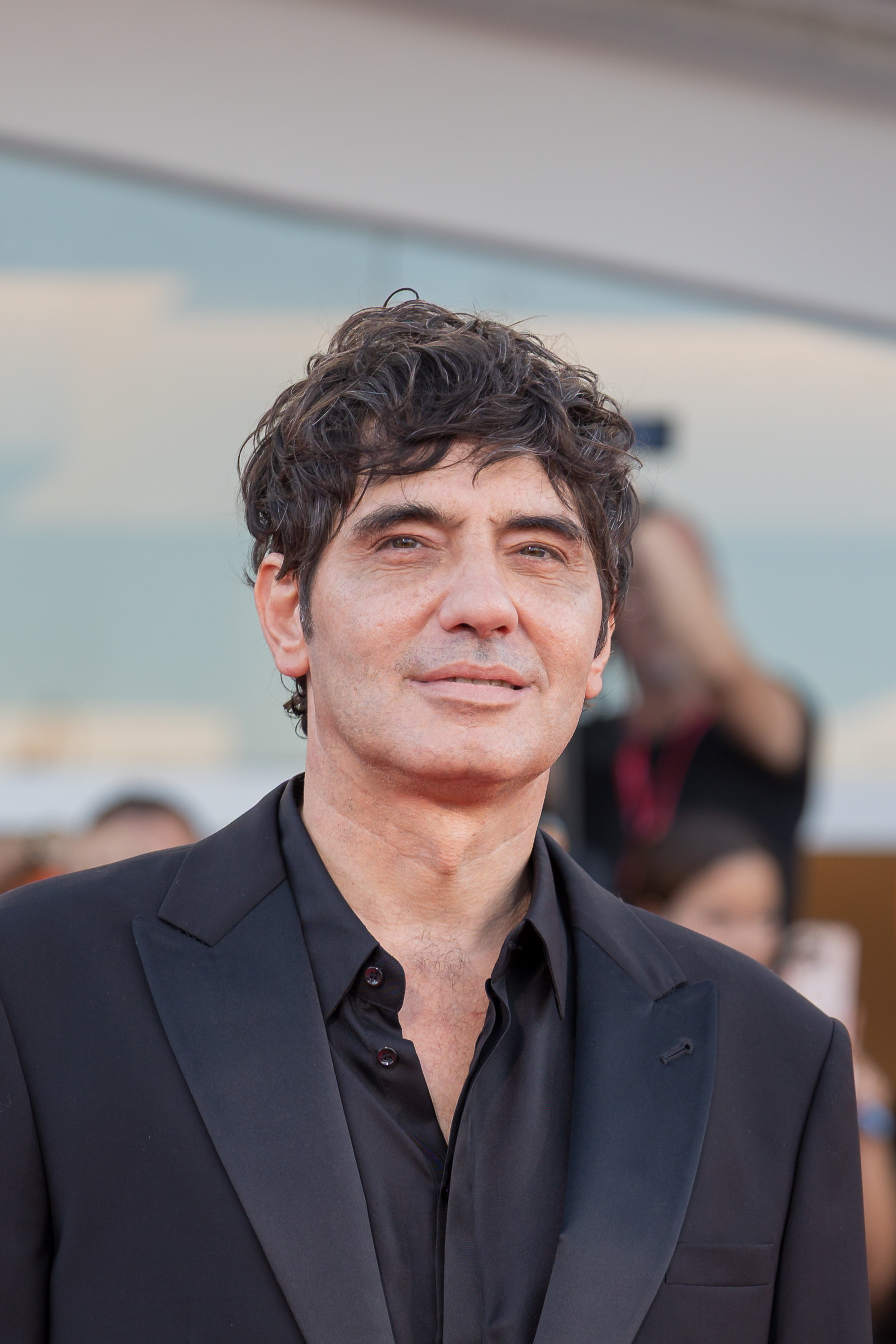
- Marcello in 2025
- Born: 2 July 1976 (age 50); Caserta, Italy
- Occupation: Film director
- Years active: 2004–present
- Known for: Martin Eden

Pietro Marcello (born 2 July 1976) is an Italian filmmaker. Most known for Martin Eden (2019), an adaptation of the 1909's Jack London classic novel of same name.

== Career ==
In 2009, Marcello's docudrama The Mouth of the Wolf (La bocca del lupo) follows Vincenzo Motta, who served a long sentence in a Genoa prison, and his love history with a trans woman named Mary Monaco in prison, Mary promised to wait for Enzo once she gets out of prison, but shortly after they find a home to share, she became addicted to heroin. The film had its world premiere at the 2009 Torino Film Festival winning the FIPRESCI Prize for best film. And was also selected for the 60th Berlin International Film Festival where it won the Caligari Film Award and the Teddy Award for best documentary.

Martin Eden, based on Jack London's classic novel, sets the classic book themes and characters against a post-war Naples-set background. The film had its world premiere at the main competition of the 76th Venice International Film Festival, Marcello received nominations at the 33rd European Film Awards, 65th David di Donatello (winning Best Adapted Screenplay), Gotham Independent Film Awards 2020, and won the Platform Prize at the 2019 Toronto International Film Festival (TIFF).

== Filmography ==
Year	English title	Original title	Notes
2007	Crossing the Line	Il passaggio della linea	Documentary
2009	The Mouth of the Wolf	La bocca del lupo	Documentary
2011	The Silence of Pelesjan	Il silenzio di Pelesjan	Documentary
2015	Lost and Beautiful	Bella e perduta	
2019	Martin Eden		Based on Martin Eden by Jack London
2021	For Lucio	Per Lucio	Documentary
2021	Futura		Documentary; Co-directed with Francesco Munzi and Alice Rohrwacher
2022	Scarlet	L’envol	
2025	Duse		
