= Martin Eden (2019 film) =

2019 film

- International film poster
- Directed by: Pietro Marcello
- Screenplay by: Maurizio Braucci; Pietro Marcello
- Based on: Martin Eden by Jack London
- Produced by: Pietro Marcello; Beppe Caschetto; Thomas Ordonneau; Michael Weber; Viola Fügen
- Starring: Luca Marinelli; Carlo Cecchi; Jessica Cressy; Vincenzo Nemolato; Marco Leonardi; Denise Sardisco; Carmen Pommella
- Cinematography: Alessandro Abate; Franco Di Giacomo
- Edited by: Aline Hervé; Fabrizio Federico
- Music by: Marco Messina; Sacha Ricci
- Production companies: Avventurosa; IBC Movie; Rai Cinema; Shellac Sud; The Match Factory
- Distributed by: 01 Distribution (Italy); Shellac Distribution (France); Kino Lorber (US)
- Release dates: 2 September 2019 (Venice); 4 September 2019 (Italy); 16 October 2019 (France)
- Running time: 129 minutes
- Countries: Italy; France
- Language: Italian
- Box office: $3 million

Martin Eden is a 2019 Italian-French historical romance drama film directed by Pietro Marcello. The film is loosely based on the novel of the same name by Jack London, in a Naples-set background, and follows an illiterate sailor's journey to establish himself as a writer in post-war Italy.

The film was selected to compete for the Golden Lion at the 76th Venice International Film Festival, where Luca Marinelli won the Volpi Cup for Best Actor.

== Plot ==
After saving Arturo, a young scion of the industrial middle class, from a beating, the sailor Martin Eden is invited to the boy’s family home. Here he meets Elena, Arturo’s beautiful sister, and falls in love with her at first sight. The cultured and refined young woman becomes not only the object of Martin’s affections but also a symbol of the social status he aspires to achieve. At the cost of enormous efforts and overcoming the obstacles represented by his humble origin, Martin pursues the dream of becoming a writer and—under the influence of the elderly intellectual Russ Brissenden—becomes involved in socialist circles, bringing him into conflict with Elena and her bourgeois world.

== Cast ==
- Luca Marinelli as Martin Eden
- Carlo Cecchi as Russ Brissenden
- Jessica Cressy as Elena Orsini
- Vincenzo Nemolato as Nino
- Marco Leonardi as Bernardo
- Denise Sardisco as Margherita
- Carmen Pommella as Maria
- Autilia Ranieri as Giulia
- Savino Paparella as Edmondo Peluso
- Elisabetta Valgoi as Matilde Orsini
- Pietro Ragusa as Mr. Orsini
- Giustiniano Alpi as Arturo Orsini
- Dario Iubatti as Leone
- Anna Patierno as Carmela
- Vincenza Modica as Annina
- Gaetano Bruno as Judge Mattei
- Maurizio Donadoni as Renato
- Lana Vladi as Rebecca
- Chiara Francini as Nora
- Aniello Arena as François
- Rinat Khismatouline as Corporal
- Giordano Bruno Guerri as Alfio

== Production ==
Principal photography for the film began in May 2018 in Naples, Italy.

== Release ==
The film had its world premiere at the Venice International Film Festival on 2 September 2019. It was screened at the 2019 Toronto International Film Festival in the Platform Prize program, winning the section main prize on 12 September.

It was released in Italy by 01 Distribution on 4 September 2019. It was released in France by Shellac Distribution on 16 October 2019.

== Reception ==
=== Box office ===
Martin Eden grossed $0 in North America and $3 million in other territories. Due to the ongoing COVID-19 pandemic, Kino Lorber had opted for a VOD release.

=== Critical response ===
On review aggregator Rotten Tomatoes, the film holds an approval rating of 87% based on 108 reviews, with an average rating of 7.4/10. According to the website's critical consensus: "Martin Eden uses one man's quest for fulfillment as fuel for an ambitious—and often rewarding—look at a complex array of social and personal themes." On Metacritic, the film holds a rating of 75 out of 100, based on 22 critics, indicating "generally positive reviews."
