= 88:88 =

2015 Canadian experimental film

- Directed by: Isiah Medina
- Written by: Isiah Medina
- Produced by: Isiah Medina
- Starring: Erik J. Berg; Eliza Bronte; Avery Medina; Myles Taylor; Anna Valencia
- Cinematography: Alexandre Galmard; Nic Kriellaars; Isiah Medina
- Edited by: Isiah Medina
- Music by: Kieran Daly; Alexandre Galmard
- Release date: August 12, 2015 (Locarno)
- Running time: 65 minutes
- Country: Canada
- Language: English

88:88 is a 2015 Canadian experimental docudrama film, directed by Isiah Medina. A meditation on poverty, the film depicts the economic struggles of a group of young people in Winnipeg, using editing instead of narrative to drive the film in a stream of consciousness manner described by some critics as the filmic equivalent of a mixtape.

The film's cast includes Erik J. Berg, Eliza Bronte, Avery Medina, Myles Taylor and Anna Valencia. The film's title is a reference to the 88:88 that displays on a digital clock after a power interruption.

The film premiered at the Locarno Film Festival in August 2015, and had its Canadian premiere at the 2015 Toronto International Film Festival.

The film was added to the Mubi platform in 2016, and to YouTube later in the year.

The film was named the sixth best undistributed film of 2015 in the 2015 IndieWire Critics Poll. At the 2016 Vancouver Film Critics Circle awards, Medina received a nomination for Best Director of a Canadian Film.
