= Feel Like Dance =

1995 single by Globe

Single by Globe

from the album Globe
- Language: Japanese; English
- Released: August 9, 1995
- Genre: J-pop; dance-pop
- Length: 5:57
- Label: Avex Globe
- Songwriter: Tetsuya Komuro
- Producer: Tetsuya Komuro

Globe singles chronology
"Feel Like Dance" (1995)	"Joy to the Love" (1995)

Music videos
- "Feel Like Dance" on YouTube

"Feel Like Dance" is the debut single by Japanese band Globe. Written by Tetsuya Komuro, the single was released on August 9, 1995, by Avex Globe.

== Background and release ==
"Feel Like Dance" was used as the theme song of the Fuji TV drama series Hitori ni Shinai de.

The single peaked at No. 3 on Oricon's weekly chart. It sold over 952,000 copies and was certified Double Platinum by the RIAJ.

== Track listing ==
All tracks are written by Tetsuya Komuro.

8cm CD single
No.	Title	Length
1.	"Feel Like Dance" (Original Mix)	5:57
2.	"Feel Like Dance" (Club Mix)	6:40
3.	"Feel Like Dance" (TV Mix)	5:53

== Charts ==
Weekly charts

Chart (1995)	Peak position
Oricon Weekly Singles Chart	3

Year-end charts

Chart (1995)	Peak position
Oricon Year-End Chart	36

== Certification ==
Region	Certification	Certified units/sales
Japan (RIAJ)	2× Platinum	800,000^{^}
^{^} Shipments figures based on certification alone.

== Cover versions ==
- Tomomi Kahara covered the song on her 2015 cover album Memories 3: Kahara Back to 1995.
- Tetsuya Komuro self-covered the song as a piano solo on the 2015 Globe tribute album #globe20th: Special Cover Best.
