= Departures (song) =

1996 single by Globe

Single by Globe

from the album Globe
- Language: Japanese; English
- Released: January 1, 1996
- Genre: J-pop; dance-pop
- Length: 5:15
- Label: Avex Globe
- Songwriter: Tetsuya Komuro
- Producer: Tetsuya Komuro

Globe singles chronology
"Sweet Pain" (1995)	"Departures" (1996)	"Freedom" (1996)

Music videos
- "Departures" on YouTube

"Departures" is the fourth single by Japanese band Globe. Written by Tetsuya Komuro, the single was released on January 1, 1996, by Avex Globe.

== Background and release ==
"Departures" was written by Komuro as a tie-in for JR East's "JR Ski Ski" campaign of 1996. The jacket photo was taken at the Ambassador Hotel in Los Angeles.

The single became Globe's second No. 1 on Oricon's weekly chart. It went on to become the second best-selling single in Japan in 1996 and it is the 15th best-selling physical single in Japan, having sold a total of 2.288 million copies.

== Music video ==
To celebrate the band's 20th anniversary, a new music video for "Departures" was released on May 3, 2016 as part of the "Music Video Drama Project." Directed by Shogo Yabuuchi and starring Ayaka Miyoshi, the video's theme is "breaking away from tragedy caused by love". In the video, Miyoshi plays a grief-stricken woman who exits a train and climbs a snowy mountain with a rifle in hand. Overwhelmed by her sadness, she fires her rifle in the air twice.

== Track listing ==
All tracks are written by Tetsuya Komuro.

8cm CD single
No.	Title	Length
1.	"Departures" (Radio Edit)	5:15
2.	"Departures" (Extended Mix)	6:48
3.	"Departures" (Instrumental)	5:15

== Charts ==
Weekly charts

Chart (1996)	Peak position
Oricon Weekly Singles Chart	1

Year-end charts

Chart (1996)	Peak position
Oricon Year-End Chart	2

== Certifications ==
Region	Certification	Certified units/sales
Japan (RIAJ) Physical	2× Million	2,000,000^{^}
Japan (RIAJ) Digital	Gold	100,000^{*}
Streaming
Japan (RIAJ)	Gold	50,000,000^{†}
^{*} Sales figures based on certification alone.^{^} Shipments figures based on certification alone.^{†} Streaming-only figures based on certification alone.

== Cover versions ==
- Demon Kogure covered the song on his 2009 album Girls' Rock: Tiara.
- Spontania covered the song on their self-titled 2010 album.
- AAA covered the song on their 2011 album Buzz Communication.
- Diana Garnet covered the song on her 2013 cover album Cover Girl
- Tomomi Kahara covered the song on her 2014 cover album Memories: Kahara Covers.
- Ms.OOJA covered the song on her 2014 cover album Woman 2: Love Song Covers.
- Hyde covered the song on the 2015 Globe tribute album #Globe20th: Special Cover Best.
- Desurabbits covered the song on their 2016 compilation album Exa Idol Complex: Super Duper!
- Raise A Suilen covered the song from Bang Dream.
