= Globe (album) =

Studio album by Globe
- Released: March 31, 1996
- Genre: J-pop; dance-pop
- Length: 57:03
- Language: Japanese; English
- Label: Avex Globe
- Producer: Tetsuya Komuro

Globe chronology
Globe (1996)	Faces Places (1997)

Singles from Globe
- 1. "Feel Like Dance" Released: August 9, 1995; 2. "Joy to the Love" Released: September 27, 1995; 3. "Sweet Pain" Released: November 1, 1995; 4. "Departures" Released: January 1, 1996; 5. "Freedom" Released: March 27, 1996

Globe (stylized as globe) is the debut studio album by Japanese band Globe. Released by Avex Trax on March 31, 1996, the album features the singles "Feel Like Dance", "Joy to the Love", "Sweet Pain", "Departures, and "Freedom". "Departures" sold over two million copies, becoming the second highest-selling single in Japan (behind Mr. Children's "Namonaki Uta").

The album hit No. 1 on Oricon's weekly albums chart. It sold over 4,136,000 copies and was certified as a 4 Million seller by the RIAJ.

== Track listing ==
All music is composed by Tetsuya Komuro

No.	Title	Lyrics	Length
1.	"Give You" (Instrumental)		1:13
2.	"Feel Like Dance"	Komuro	5:55
3.	"Gonna Be Alright"	Komuro; Marc	5:05
4.	"Departures"	Komuro; Marc	5:25
5.	"Regret of the Day"	Komuro; Marc	5:18
6.	"Joy to the Love"	Komuro	4:15
7.	"Sweet Pain"	Komuro	5:09
8.	"Always Together"	Komuro; Marc	5:16
9.	"Precious Memories"	Komuro	6:16
10.	"Freedom"	Komuro; Marc	5:13
11.	"Music Takes Me Higher"	Komuro; Marc	4:22
12.	"Lights Out"	Komuro	3:37
Total length:			57:03

2017 Deluxe Edition bonus tracks
No.	Title	Length
13.	"Feel Like Dance" (Instrumental)
14.	"Departures" (Album Mix Instrumental)
15.	"Joy to the Love" (Instrumental)
16.	"Sweet Pain" (Instrumental)
17.	"Always Together" (Instrumental)
18.	"Precious Memories" (Instrumental)
19.	"Freedom" (SG Instrumental Ver.)
20.	"Music Takes Me Higher" (Instrumental)

== Charts ==
Weekly charts

Chart (1996)	Peak position
Japanese Albums (Oricon)	1

Year-end charts

Chart (1996)	Peak position
Japanese Albums (Oricon)	1

Chart (1997)	Peak position
Japanese Albums (Oricon)	51

== Certification ==
Region	Certification	Certified units/sales
Japan (RIAJ)	4× Million	4,000,000^{^}
^{^} Shipments figures based on certification alone.

Preceded by Kiyokawa no Michi: 48-ban (Eiichi Arai)	Japan Record Award for the Best Album; 1996	Succeeded by Beloved (Glay)
