= Lost and Beautiful =

- Directed by: Pietro Marcello
- Written by: Pietro Marcello; Maurizio Braucci
- Produced by: Sara Fgaier; Pietro Marcello
- Starring: Sergio Vitolo
- Cinematography: Salvatore Landi; Pietro Marcello
- Music by: Marco Messina; Sacha Ricci
- Release date: 9 August 2015 (Locarno Film Festival)
- Running time: 88 minutes
- Language: Italian

Lost and Beautiful (Italian: Bella e perduta) is a 2015 Italian fantasy drama film produced, written and directed by Pietro Marcello. It was entered into the main competition at the 2015 Locarno Film Festival.

== Plot ==
Pulcinella, mask of the Campania tradition, intermediary between the living and the dead, has the mission of fulfilling the last wishes of a simple Campania shepherd, Tommaso Cestrone: to rescue a buffalo named Sarchiapone.

Pulcinella then goes to the Royal Palace of Carditello, a Bourbon residence abandoned to itself in the heart of the land of fires, of which Tommaso was the voluntary guardian and where the young buffalo is found. He takes it with him to the north, on a long journey through a beautiful and lost Italy.

== Cast ==
- Sergio Vitolo as Pulcinella
- Tommaso Cestrone as Tommaso
- Gesuino Pittalis as Pastore
- Elio Germano as Sarchiapone (voice)

== See also ==
- List of Italian films of 2015
