= Dark Night (2016 film) =

2016 film

- Film poster
- Directed by: Tim Sutton
- Written by: Tim Sutton
- Produced by: Alexandra Byer; Martin Marquet
- Starring: Robert Jumper; Anna Rose Hopkins
- Cinematography: Hélène Louvart
- Edited by: Jeanne Applegate
- Music by: Maica Armata
- Distributed by: Arbelos Films
- Release date: January 24, 2016 (Sundance)
- Running time: 85 minutes
- Country: United States
- Language: English

Dark Night is a 2016 American drama film directed by Tim Sutton. It is loosely based on the 2012 Aurora, Colorado shooting. For example, there are some differences in the film versus the event: the film is set in Florida, whereas the shooting occurred in Colorado; the identities of the Aurora shooter and the victims are altered in the film. It was screened in the Horizons section at the 73rd Venice International Film Festival. The film was shot in Sarasota, Florida.

== Plot ==
The film is told changing in between scenes of different characters in the duration of a whole day. A teenage boy named Aaron being interviewed with his mom, a shady man, some skaters; one of them with red hair, an army veteran, a therapy session group and a group of girls looking forward to going to the movies that night.

During the film, various scenes happen that give hints that one of them is planning a mass shooting. Aaron has apparent anti-social behaviors, subtle delusions of being the center of attention and an avid liking of shooting-genre videogames. The army veteran is seen attending a support group, cleaning various weapons and visiting a shooting range where he manages to headshot the targets.

From all the characters, the one who stands out are the shady man's hostile movements, as he makes recognition trips with Google Street View of a mall, counts the steps from the parking lot to the building and also is unstable and volatile. He looks for his ex-girlfriend who is at a guitar lesson while armed with an automatic rifle but hesitates and is incapable of doing her harm. Later, at one point he's seen trying different masks, one of them being a Batman mask.

At the end of the day in the evening, almost all the characters are together in a movie theater or in the immediate surroundings of it inside the mall. The shady man then arrives in tactical gear, with a maniacal smile and enters the mall through a service door.

The aftermath is shown in a single scene at the start of the movie with one of the girls sitting outside the mall, visibly traumatized, with some blood-stains in her outfit, alone and with flickering emergency lights illuminating her face.

== Cast ==
- Robert Jumper as Jumper
- Anna Rose Hopkins as Summer
- Rosie Rodriguez
- Karina Macias
- Aaron Purvis as Aaron
- Eddie Cacciola as Veteran

== Reception ==
On the review aggregator website Rotten Tomatoes, the film holds an approval rating of 62%, based on 52 reviews, with an average rating of 5.95/10. The website's critical consensus reads, "Dark Night's narrative coherence isn't always on par with its visual beauty, but for patient viewers, it adds up to an absorbing, thought-provoking, and thoroughly singular statement." On Metacritic, the film has a weighted average score of 60 out of 100, based on 22 critics, indicating "mixed or average" reviews.
