= Globe (band) =

Japanese pop band

- Also known as: Globe Extreme
- Origin: Japan
- Genres: Synthpop, trance, alternative, Eurobeat
- Years active: 1995–present
- Labels: Universal Records Japan; Avex Globe
- Members: Keiko Yamada; Tetsuya Komuro; Marc Panther
- Past members: Yoshiki
- Website: avex.jp/globe/

Globe (グローブ, Gurōbu; also styled as globe) is a dance-oriented Japanese pop band, formed in 1995 by the producer and songwriter Tetsuya Komuro. Originally consisting of Komuro, Keiko Yamada and Marc Panther, the group's singles consistently entered the charts. In late 2002, Yoshiki, the drummer and pianist of X Japan, joined the group, but he left the band about a year later.

Their self-titled 1996 debut album sold over four million copies and their 1998 single, "Wanna Be a Dreammaker", won the grand prix award at the 40th Japan Record Awards, the Japanese record industry's highest honor. Komuro said that there would be some collaboration work with other artists with the artist title of Globe Featuring, and Globe Extreme for collaborations with Yoshiki.

== Members ==
Globe

- Tetsuya "TK" Komuro – the ex-pianist, producer and mastermind of the band; in the Globe Extreme era he played the guitar instead of keyboards.
- Keiko Yamada – the main vocalist of the band; sings in Japanese and English.
- Marc Panther (real name Ryūichi Sakai (酒井 龍一, Sakai Ryūichi)) – the rapper of the band; sings in English, French and Japanese.

Globe Extreme

- Yoshiki – played piano and keyboards; joined in September 2002, but by August 2005 he was already out of Globe because of work matters.

Support musician

- Jinsei Rikori – drums and music programming

== Background ==
The Globe emblem, used by the band since its first album Globe, was released in 1996.

=== 1994–1998: Origins and early success ===
In the climb of his fame, producer Komuro organized one of his castings, searching for new singers in 1994 (especially one that was called Eurogroove Night). The young girl Keiko Yamada assisted, encouraged by her friends, and her voice undoubtedly attracted Komuro's attention instantly. He chose her initially for a solo career. Another one of the careers that TK was thinking about producing at that time was that of the model and MTV VJ Marc Panther, who knew English and French as well as from Japanese. Komuro finally had the idea to make a band using Yamada and Panther as main vocalists and himself as keyboard player and also some vocals.

The band signed with the Avex label in 1995, creating its own sub-label called "Avex Globe". In August 1995, the first single, "Feel Like Dance", was released. The fourth single, "Departures", released in 1996, sold more than 2 million copies. The band's first studio album, Globe, also released in 1996, managed to sell more than 4 million copies according to Oricon. It was the best selling album of the year. After having obtained such sales in only two years of work, with more than 12 million singles sold (only in Japan) and 13 million copies of albums, the band was established as a leading pop band in Japan.

The band released a second studio album, Faces Places, on March 12, 1997. To promote it, the band began their its large scale tour called Globe@4Domes in which they performed at the four biggest Japanese domes: Osaka, Fukuoka, Nagoya and Tokyo. A few months later, the band began its first overseas tour around Asia with Namie Amuro and TRF, also from the Komuro stable. In 1998, they released four singles in about one month in a project called the "Brand New Globe 4 Singles". One of them, "Wanna Be a Dreammaker", won the grand prix award at the Japan Record Award.

=== 1999–2002: Experimentation and declining sales ===
After a regular period of singles and albums, including a hit "best-of" compilation, Cruise Record 1995-2000 (#1 at Oricon), the band started to experiment with its music, exploring new musical areas. The first big step in this new era was the "Globe Featuring" project in 2000, in which each member of the band released one single as a solo artist. The most successful of the three singles was Yamada's "On the Way to You", and she went on her first solo nationwide tour of Japan because of the success.

As new music influences were being received in Japan, electronic music like trance became one of the main styles that Globe decided to try. However, this new style was not so well received by Globe's fans. Their fourth studio album, Outernet, sold poorly compared to previous works. Globe went from selling millions of copies of an album to selling a mere 100 thousand. Komuro, though, was not willing to give up his new style of music for the pop tunes that made Globe so popular in the early 1990s.

In 2002, Globe was even more into the trance style, releasing two studio albums that year: Lights and Lights2. In July 2002, Globe and the Belgian DJ Push collaborated on the single "Dreams From Above" for the set of Avex's Cyber Trance series. On September 1, Yoshiki, the former drummer and pianist of X Japan, joined Globe as its fourth member. Meanwhile, the band was appearing in A-Nation, and the news of the change quickly spread throughout Asia and the world. On November 22, it was announced that Komuro and Yamada were marrying. The ceremony was televised live, causing considerable controversy. The new era of the band, known as Globe Extreme (now with Yoshiki), began some weeks later, with the single "Seize the Light", a song created by Yoshiki and produced by Komuro. A second "best of" album was also released to commemorate the first eight years of Globe's musical career, entitled 8 Years: Many Classic Moments (#2 at Oricon).

=== 2003–2006: Hiatus, solo interests and new style ===
After the release of a new album called Level 4 and "Get It On feat. Keiko" (the only works with Yoshiki), the band went on a two-year break and its members pursued solo interests. Yamada was the first one to go solo, releasing her first single "KCO" in December 2003. In 2004, Panther started his solo project under the pseudonym of 245, a project that has plans for international projection beyond Japan. Later it was announced that the Globe Extreme era had ended and that Yoshiki was leaving the band. The band went back to having three members: TK, Yamada and Panther. Yoshiki's departure from the group was not completely clarified, but apparently the musician had other work-related commitments. The only release from Globe during 2004 was their complete singles collection, Globe Decade: Single History 1995-2004, which included all of the band's singles from "Feel Like Dance" to "Get It On feat. Keiko" (a limited edition deluxe box contained every single, album and DVD ever released by the band).

In 2005, after the two-year hiatus, Globe returned to the musical scene with a new single called "Here I Am" (used as the opening theme of the Black Jack anime), and in August of that year released their ninth studio album Globe2 Pop/Rock to commemorate their 11th anniversary. This album was supposed to be a continuation of the band's first album; the hard electronic music was replaced by pop and rock influences. They also released their first online single through iTunes Japan called "Judgement".

In 2006, it was announced that Globe was about to release its 31st single, "Soldier", on March 1. Later, the release was cancelled, and as its replacement the band released a new studio album on March 23, entitled Maniac. The album did not have any single or music video promoting it. Only "Soldier" was used in advertisements, using a few incomplete scenes from the shooting of the video in TV spots because the full music video was never finished. A few months later, the band went to Latin America to record new material for a first mini-album, New Deal, released on August 9, 2006. Latin American musical influences were the main theme of the mini-album, in which Spanish-language phrases were added to songs for the first time.

New Deal was the band's final album.

=== 2007–2008: TK's legal controversy and presumed hiatus ===
Although the band had not released anything since 2006's mini-album New Deal, no official announcement was made by TK that it had disbanded. Two new singles were originally set to be released in 2008, covers of TM Network's songs "Get Wild" and "Self Control", but these were cancelled by Avex because of Komuro's fraud controversy. All of their music was removed from digital downloads, such as iTunes, in both Japan and the US.

=== 2009–2016: Return from hiatus ===
On August 30, 2009, Globe officially announced its return at the A-nation music festival. TK appeared first, speaking about the return and the end of the legal issues. He played several of his greatest hits, both by Globe and songs he wrote for other artists, on piano. Yamada and Panther then joined him and they sang "Face" and "Many Classic Moments". Their music returned to iTunes in Japan and the US around this date.

On October 24, 2011, Yamada was admitted to hospital and diagnosed with a subarachnoid hemorrhage. She subsequently underwent a five-hour operation to repair the condition.

=== 2017–2021: possible return and Komuro–Yamada divorce ===
On June 28, 2017, Globe returned without Yamada and appeared during a televised show to perform with the singer Hiroko Shimabukuro of Speed. They performed the singles "Face" and "Precious Memories".

On August 15, Komuro posted on his Instagram a video in which Yamada can be heard interpreting an unpublished song, "Keiko 2016–2017".

TK wrote a comment -"After she got sick, I made a song for her to try to sing. It's Keiko's voice. I think she's getting better now" -which implied the entire Globe line-up was in the works of a reunion.

In January 2018, it was reported that Komuro had been having an affair with Yamada's nurse while she was in recovery. Shortly after this was reported, Komuro announced his retirement from the music industry, thus essentially putting an end to Globe, among his other projects. Since then, Komuro has returned to the music industry, and there were also reports of divorce settlement talks with Yamada. In February 2021, their divorce was finalized, and the future of Globe is more uncertain than ever. Both sides express the hope and possibility that despite their divorce, they could still work together as Globe in the future.

=== 2022–present: 10,000 days and 30th anniversary ===
On December 24, 2022, the group marked 10,000 days since its debut with the box set 10000 Days, which included the previously unreleased song "Whiteout". In August 2025, Globe celebrated its 30th anniversary with the six-disc compilation All Singles & Other Best 30 Selection, containing all 36 of its singles and 30 additional tracks. It was followed by a complete Blu-ray edition of the group's 1996 first tour, vinyl editions of its first four albums, and the limited Premium Limited 8cm Single Box. In August 2026, Avex released a remastered Blu-ray edition of the 1998 Love Again tour.

== Discography ==
Globe's self-titled debut album sold more than four million copies in Japan. The group followed it with albums including Faces Places, Love Again, Relation, Outernet, Lights and Lights 2. Its singles include "Feel Like Dance", "Departures", "Can't Stop Fallin' in Love", "Face", "Wanna Be a Dreammaker" and "Here I Am". The 2025 compilation All Singles & Other Best 30 Selection collected all 36 singles and 30 additional tracks.
