= De Palma (film) =

- Film poster
- Directed by: Noah Baumbach; Jake Paltrow
- Produced by: Noah Baumbach; Jake Paltrow
- Starring: Brian De Palma
- Edited by: Lauren Minnerath; Matt Mayer
- Production company: Empire Ward Pictures
- Distributed by: A24
- Release dates: September 9, 2015 (Venice); June 10, 2016 (United States)
- Running time: 107 minutes
- Country: United States
- Language: English
- Box office: $168,045

De Palma is a 2015 American documentary film directed by Noah Baumbach and Jake Paltrow about the director and screenwriter Brian De Palma. The documentary features clips from his films starring various frequent collaborators like Al Pacino, John Lithgow, Tom Cruise, Sean Penn, Nicolas Cage, Sean Connery, Michael Caine, John Travolta and various others.

== Release ==
It had its world premiere at the 72nd edition of the Venice Film Festival, where it screened out of competition.

== Reception ==
=== Critical response ===
On the review aggregator website Rotten Tomatoes, the film holds an approval rating of 95%, based on 112 reviews, with an average rating of 8.0/10. The site's consensus states: "De Palma may not make believers out of the director's detractors, but they'll likely share longtime fans' fascination with his career's worth of entertaining stories." It has a score of 83 out of 100 on Metacritic, based on 31 critics, indicating "universal acclaim".

== See also ==
- Vulgar auteurism
- New Hollywood
- Alfred Hitchcock
