= Faces Places =

Studio album by Globe
- Released: 1997
- Genre: Pop, alternative rock
- Length: 72:34
- Label: Avex Globe
- Producer: Tetsuya Komuro

Globe chronology
Globe (1996)	Faces Places (1997)	Love Again (1998)

Faces Places (stylized as FACES PLACES) is the second studio album by Globe released in 1997.

== Album information ==
Singles from the album were "Is This Love", "Can't Stop Fallin' in Love", "Face", "Faces Places" and "Anytime Smokin' Cigarette". Globe recorded the three songs "Is This Love", "Can't Stop Fallin' in Love" and "Face" by new arrangements on the album.

Faces Places debuted at the number-one position within its first week with sales of over 1,648,000 copies on the Japanese Oricon weekly album charts.

The album sold over three million copies and became the third best-selling album on the Oricon yearly album charts of 1997 behind Glay's album Review and Mr. Children's album Bolero.

The album won the 12th Japan Gold Disc Award for 'Pop Album of the Year'.

== Track listing ==
All composed and arranged by: Tetsuya Komuro
Lyric: Tetsuya Komuro & Mark (track: 2–4, 6–12), Mark (track: 5)

1. "Overdose"
2. "Degenerate"
3. "Faces Places"
4. "Is This Love"
5. "So Far Away From Home (Beautiful Journey)"
6. "A Temporary Girl"
7. "Because I Love the Night"
8. "Anytime Smokin' Cigarette"
9. "Watch the Movie"
10. "A Picture on My Mind"
11. "Face"
12. "Can't Stop Fallin' in Love"
13. "Can't Stop" (Piano Solo)
14. "Faces Places" (Remix)
