= My Entire High School Sinking into the Sea =

2016 film

- Theatrical release poster
- Directed by: Dash Shaw
- Written by: Dash Shaw
- Produced by: Kyle Martin; Craig Zobel; Dash Shaw
- Starring: Jason Schwartzman; Reggie Watts; Maya Rudolph; Lena Dunham; Susan Sarandon; Thomas Jay Ryan; Alex Karpovsky; John Cameron Mitchell
- Edited by: Alex Abrahams; Lance Edmands
- Music by: Rani Sharone
- Production companies: Washington Square Films; Electric Chinoland; Low Spark Films
- Distributed by: GKIDS
- Release dates: September 11, 2016 (TIFF); April 14, 2017 (United States)
- Running time: 75 minutes
- Country: United States
- Language: English
- Box office: $68,883

My Entire High School Sinking into the Sea is a 2016 American animated disaster teen comedy drama film produced, written and directed by Dash Shaw. The film stars Jason Schwartzman, Reggie Watts, Maya Rudolph, Lena Dunham, Susan Sarandon, Thomas Jay Ryan, Alex Karpovsky and John Cameron Mitchell. The film was selected to be screened in the Vanguard section at the 2016 Toronto International Film Festival, and was theatrically released in the United States on April 14, 2017 by GKIDS.

== Plot ==
Dash and his best friend Assaf are sophomores at Tides High School, a school located at a cliff edge above a fault line. The friends write as a team for the school newspaper, edited by mutual friend Verti. But one day Verti assigns Assaf to write a story solo about the new auditorium opening in the top floor, and Dash clearly picks up a relationship forming between Assaf and Verti. Feeling angered and betrayed, Dash writes a hurtful article about Assaf that provokes Principal Grimm to put a mark on his permanent record. Dash breaks into the school archives to find his record, but discovers evidence that Grimm had forged the inspection report for the auditorium. He also runs into Mary, a junior overachiever trying to find her confiscated cell phone. Dash tries to warn the rest of the students, but gets thrown into detention along with Mary for breaking into the archives, right when the auditorium opens causing the school to break off the cliff and fall into the ocean.

Dash rescues Assaf and Verti from the sophomore level library, and Verti figures out that they can swim through the seawater by breathing trapped pockets of air. Dash nearly drowns, but is rescued by Lunch Lady Lorraine. At the junior level floor, the teachers are trying to bring surviving kids in line. It takes Lorraine to calm down a riot; she further shows her survival skills by saving Verti from a group of drug dealing students. The trio plus Lorraine and Mary decide to make it to the roof, but no one else wants to follow them. At the senior level floor, they find Brent Daniels organizing a hostile cult around him. They then find Grimm, who admits to the forgery. Grimm points out that they can scale to the roof using the back of the auditorium bleachers, and then sacrifices his life to open the bleachers up. The five friends reach the roof just as rescue helicopters arrive. Lorraine rescues a handful of other students while some others escape using a makeshift raft. Dash and Assaf vow to write a book about the disaster.

Many weeks later, the surviving students attend a party for the release of Dash and Assaf's book, Our Entire High School Sinking into the Sea. Reviews of the book come out mixed to negative because of Dash's turgid prose. Lorraine notes to Dash that she has a new year's worth of students to feed and take care of, before leaving the party.

== Cast ==
- Jason Schwartzman as Dash / Robotics Kid / Random Man / Random Woman
- Lena Dunham as Mary
- Reggie Watts as Assaf / Trolls / Male Newscaster / Senior Guard / Senior Dude
- Maya Rudolph as Verti
- Susan Sarandon as Lunch Lady Lorraine
- Thomas Jay Ryan as Principal Grimm
- Alex Karpovsky as Drake
- Louisa Krause as Gretchen
- John Cameron Mitchell as Brent Daniels
- Matthew Maher as Senior Kyle
- Margo Martindale as Mrs. Brinson
- Adam Lustick as Benji

== Release ==
The film had its world premiere at the Toronto International Film Festival on September 11, 2016. It went onto screen at Fantastic Fest, New York Film Festival, AFI Fest,

In December 2016, GKIDS acquired U.S. distribution rights to the film. It was released on April 14, 2017.

== Reception ==
=== Critical response ===
My Entire High School Sinking into the Sea received positive reviews and holds an 84% approval rating on Rotten Tomatoes, with an average rating of 7.3/10, based on 73 reviews. The site's Critics Consensus states, "My Entire High School Sinking Into the Sea's attention-getting visual style matches debuting writer-director Dash Shaw's distinctive narrative approach -- and signals a bright future for a promising talent."

On review aggregator website Metacritic, the film received a score of 72 out of 100, based on 19 critics, indicating "generally favorable reviews".
