= Cinema Scope =

Film magazine

- Editor: Mark Peranson
- Categories: Film magazine
- Frequency: Quarterly
- First issue: 1999
- Final issue: 2024
- Country: Canada
- Based in: Toronto
- Language: English
- Website: www.cinema-scope.com
- ISSN: 1488-7002

Cinema Scope was an English-language film magazine published in Toronto, Canada.

== History and profile ==
The first issue of Cinema Scope was published in 1999. Up until 2022, the magazine compiled a list of the top ten films of each year.

Mark Peranson, the magazine's editor, was awarded the Clyde Gilmour Award by the Toronto Film Critics Association in 2009.

In 2023, Peranson suggested that the ninety-sixth issue of the magazine would likely be the penultimate issue in its current format.

== Annual Top 10 Lists ==
2005
#	Film	Director	Country
1.	L'Enfant	Jean-Pierre and Luc Dardenne	Belgium
2.	The Death of Mr. Lazarescu	Cristi Puiu	Romania
3.	Caché	Michael Haneke	France
4.	Land of the Dead	George A. Romero	USA
5.	Regular Lovers	Philippe Garrel	France
6.	The Sun	Alexander Sokurov	Russia
7.	A History of Violence	David Cronenberg	USA
8.	Three Times	Hou Hsiao-hsien	Taiwan
9.	The New World	Terrence Malick	USA
10.	Homecoming	Joe Dante	USA

2006
#	Film	Director	Country
1.	Syndromes and a Century	Apichatpong Weerasethakul	Thailand
2.	Black Book	Paul Verhoeven	Netherlands
3.	Colossal Youth	Pedro Costa	Portugal
4.	A Scanner Darkly	Richard Linklater	USA
5.	Borat	Larry Charles	USA
6.	Opera Jawa	Garin Nugroho	Indonesia
7.	Children of Men	Alfonso Cuarón	USA
8.	The Host	Bong Joon-ho	South Korea
9.	Inland Empire	David Lynch	USA
10.	Old Joy	Kelly Reichardt	USA

2007
#	Film	Director	Country
1.	There Will Be Blood	Paul Thomas Anderson	USA
2.	Zodiac	David Fincher	USA
3.	Secret Sunshine	Lee Chang-dong	South Korea
4.	Unas fotos en la ciudad de Sylvia	José Luis Guerín	Spain
5.	Paranoid Park	Gus Van Sant	USA
6.	Profit Motive and the Whispering Wind	John Gianvito	USA
7.	My Winnipeg	Guy Maddin	Canada
8.	Go Go Tales	Abel Ferrara	Italy; USA
9.	La France	Serge Bozon	France
10.	4 Months, 3 Weeks and 2 Days	Cristian Mungiu	Romania

2008
#	Film	Director	Country
1.	Liverpool	Lisandro Alonso	Argentina
2.	Birdsong	Albert Serra	Spain
3.	Wendy and Lucy	Kelly Reichardt	USA
4.	24 City	Jia Zhangke	China
5.	RR	James Benning	USA
6.	Our Beloved Month of August	Miguel Gomes	Portugal
7.	Ballast	Lance Hammer	USA
8.	Itinéraire de Jean Bricard	Jean-Marie Straub, Danièle Huillet	France
9.	Still Walking	Hirokazu Kore-eda	Japan
10.	The Headless Woman	Lucrecia Martel	Argentina

2009
#	Film	Director	Country
1.	Police, Adjective	Corneliu Porumboiu	Romania
2.	Everyone Else	Maren Ade	Germany
3.	To Die Like a Man	João Pedro Rodrigues	Portugal
4.	Inglourious Basterds	Quentin Tarantino	USA
5.	Sweetgrass	Lucien Castaing-Taylor, Ilisa Barbash	USA
6.	Fantastic Mr. Fox	Wes Anderson	USA
7.	Trash Humpers	Harmony Korine	USA
8.	Alamar	Pedro Gonzalez-Rubio	Mexico
9.	Vincere	Marco Bellocchio	France
10.	Mother	Bong Joon-ho	South Korea

2010
#	Film	Director	Country
1.	Uncle Boonmee Who Can Recall His Past Lives	Apichatpong Weerasethakul	Thailand
2.	The Autobiography of Nicolae Ceaușescu	Andrei Ujică	Romania
3.	Mysteries of Lisbon	Raúl Ruiz	Portugal
4.	Film Socialisme	Jean-Luc Godard	France
5.	Winter Vacation	Li Hongqi	China
6.	The Strange Case of Angelica	Manoel de Oliveira	Portugal
7.	I Wish I Knew	Jia Zhangke	China
8.	Meek's Cutoff	Kelly Reichardt	USA
9.	Attenberg	Athina Rachel Tsangari	Greece
10.	The Ghost Writer	Roman Polanski	UK

2011
#	Film	Director	Country
1.	This Is Not a Film	Jafar Panahi, Mojtaba Mirtahmasb	Iran
2.	The Turin Horse	Béla Tarr	Hungary
3.	House of Tolerance	Bertrand Bonello	France
4.	Dreileben	Christian Petzold, Dominik Graf, Christoph Hochhäusler	Germany
5.	Once Upon a Time in Anatolia	Nuri Bilge Ceylan	Turkey
6.	The Tree of Life	Terrence Malick	USA
7.	Kill List	Ben Wheatley	UK
8.	It's the Earth Not the Moon	Gonçalo Tocha	Portugal
9.	Sleeping Sickness	Ulrich Köhler	Germany
10.	The Kid with a Bike	Jean-Pierre and Luc Dardenne	Belgium

2012
#	Film	Director	Country
1.	Leviathan	Lucien Castaing-Taylor, Véréna Paravel	USA
2.	Tabu	Miguel Gomes	Portugal
3.	Holy Motors	Leos Carax	France
4.	The Master	Paul Thomas Anderson	USA
5.	Django Unchained	Quentin Tarantino	USA
6.	Viola	Matías Piñeiro	Argentina
7.	The Last Time I Saw Macao	João Pedro Rodrigues, João Rui Guerra da Mata	Portugal
8.	autrement, la Molussie	Nicolas Rey	France
9.	Neighboring Sounds	Kleber Mendonça Filho	Brazil
10.	Moonrise Kingdom	Wes Anderson	USA

2013
#	Film	Director	Country
1.	L'Inconnu du lac	Alain Guiraudie	France
2.	Norte, the End of History	Lav Diaz	Philippines
3.	A Touch of Sin	Jia Zhangke	China
4.	What Now? Remind Me	Joaquim Pinto	Portugal
5.	The Strange Little Cat	Ramon Zürcher	Germany
6.	Stray Dogs	Tsai Ming-liang	Taiwan
7.	Inside Llewyn Davis	Coen brothers	USA
8.	Story of My Death	Albert Serra	Spain
9.	The Wolf of Wall Street	Martin Scorsese	USA
10.	Computer Chess	Andrew Bujalski	USA

2014
#	Film	Director	Country
1.	Horse Money	Pedro Costa	Portugal
2.	Adieu au Langage	Jean-Luc Godard	France; Switzerland
3.	P'tit Quinquin	Bruno Dumont	France
4.	Jauja	Lisandro Alonso	Argentina; Denmark
5.	Phoenix	Christian Petzold	Germany
6.	Inherent Vice	Paul Thomas Anderson	USA
7.	The Kindergarten Teacher	Nadav Lapid	Israel
8.	Maidan	Sergei Loznitsa	Ukraine
9.	Journey to the West	Tsai Ming-liang	Taiwan; France
10.	From What Is Before	Lav Diaz	Philippines

2015
#	Film	Director	Country
1.	Cemetery of Splendour	Apichatpong Weerasethakul	Thailand
2.	Arabian Nights	Miguel Gomes	Portugal
3.	The Assassin	Hou Hsiao-hsien	Taiwan
4.	The Forbidden Room	Guy Maddin; Evan Johnson	Canada
5.	Right Now, Wrong Then	Hong Sang-soo	South Korea
6.	Visit or Memories and Confessions	Manoel de Oliveira	Portugal
7.	Lost and Beautiful	Pietro Marcello	Italy
8.	No Home Movie	Chantal Akerman	Belgium; France
9.	The Treasure	Corneliu Porumboiu	Romania
10.	Kaili Blues	Bi Gan	China

2016
#	Film	Director	Country
1.	Toni Erdmann	Maren Ade	Germany
2.	Sieranevada	Cristi Puiu	Romania
3.	Nocturama	Bertrand Bonello	France
4.	Elle	Paul Verhoeven	France
5.	The Death of Louis XIV	Albert Serra	Spain; France
6.	Certain Women	Kelly Reichardt	USA
7.	The Dreamed Path	Angela Schanelec	Germany
8.	The Human Surge	Eduardo Williams	Argentina
9.	Aquarius	Kleber Mendonça Filho	Brazil
10.	Silence	Martin Scorsese	USA

2017
#	Film	Director	Country
1.	Twin Peaks: The Return	David Lynch	USA
2.	Western	Valeska Grisebach	Germany
3.	Zama	Lucrecia Martel	Argentina
4.	On the Beach at Night Alone	Hong Sang-soo	South Korea
5.	Phantom Thread	Paul Thomas Anderson	USA
6.	Good Time	Safdie brothers	USA
7.	Streetscapes [Dialogue]	Heinz Emigholz	Germany
8.	Jeannette: The Childhood of Joan of Arc	Bruno Dumont	France
9.	First Reformed	Paul Schrader	USA
10.	Prototype	William Blake	Canada

2018
#	Film	Director	Country
1.	An Elephant Sitting Still	Hu Bo	China
2.	Le Livre d'image	Jean-Luc Godard	Switzerland; France
3.	La Flor	Mariano Llinás	Argentina
4.	Transit	Christian Petzold	Germany
5.	What You Gonna Do When the World's on Fire?	Roberto Minervini	Italy; USA
6.	Long Day's Journey into Night	Bi Gan	China
7.	Happy as Lazzaro	Alice Rohrwacher	Italy
8.	Burning	Lee Chang-dong	South Korea
9.	The Other Side of the Wind	Orson Welles	USA
10.	High Life	Claire Denis	France

2019
#	Film	Director	Country
1.	I Was at Home, But	Angela Schanelec	Germany
2.	Vitalina Varela	Pedro Costa	Portugal
3.	Martin Eden	Pietro Marcello	Italy
4.	Uncut Gems	Safdie brothers	USA
5.	Liberté	Albert Serra	Spain; France
6.	Heimat ist ein Raum aus Zeit	Thomas Heise	Germany
7.	Parasite	Bong Joon-ho	South Korea
8.	Once Upon a Time in Hollywood	Quentin Tarantino	USA
9.	Synonyms	Nadav Lapid	Israel; France
10.	The Irishman	Martin Scorsese	USA

2020
#	Film	Director	Country
1.	Days	Tsai Ming-liang	Taiwan
2.	The Works and Days (of Tayoko Shiojiri in the Shiotani Basin)	Anders Edström; C.W. Winter	USA; Japan
3.	The Year of the Discovery	Luis López Carrasco	Spain
4.	The Last City	Heinz Emigholz	Germany
5.	Small Axe: Lovers Rock	Steve McQueen	UK
6.	The Woman Who Ran	Hong Sang-soo	South Korea
7.	Malmkrog	Cristi Puiu	Romania
8.	DAU. Natasha	Ilya Khrzhanovsky	Russia
9.	City Hall	Frederick Wiseman	USA
10.	Fauna	Nicolás Pereda	Mexico

2021
#	Film	Director	Country
1.	What Do We See When We Look at the Sky?	Alexandre Koberidze	Georgia; Germany
2.	Memoria	Apichatpong Weerasethakul	Colombia; Thailand
3.	Drive My Car	Ryusuke Hamaguchi	Japan
4.	France	Bruno Dumont	France
5.	In Front of Your Face	Hong Sang-soo	South Korea
6.	Wheel of Fortune and Fantasy	Ryusuke Hamaguchi	Japan
7.	Annette	Leos Carax	France
8.	Benedetta	Paul Verhoeven	France
9.	The Tsugua Diaries	Maureen Fazendeiro; Miguel Gomes	Portugal; France
10.	The Souvenir Part II	Joanna Hogg	UK

2022
#	Film	Director	Country
1.	Pacifiction	Albert Serra	France; Spain
2.	De Humani Corporis Fabrica	Lucien Castaing-Taylor; Véréna Paravel	France; Switzerland
3.	Crimes of the Future	David Cronenberg	Canada
4.	Unrest	Cyril Schäublin	Switzerland
5.	The Novelist's Film	Hong Sang-soo	South Korea
6.	Saint Omer	Alice Diop	France
7.	Showing Up	Kelly Reichardt	USA
8.	EO	Jerzy Skolimowski	Poland
9.	Queens of the Qing Dynasty	Ashley McKenzie	Canada
10.	The Plains	David Easteal	Australia
