= Manakamana (film) =

2013 documentary

- Theatrical release poster
- Directed by: Stephanie Spray, Pacho Velez
- Produced by: Lucien Castaing-Taylor, Véréna Paravel
- Distributed by: Cinema Guild
- Release date: 12 August 2013 (Locarno Film Festival)
- Running time: 118 minutes
- Country: United States
- Languages: Nepali; English
- Budget: $10,000
- Box office: $30,029

Manakamana is a 2013 documentary film directed by Stephanie Spray and Pacho Velez of the Sensory Ethnography Lab at Harvard University. It is an experimental documentary about pilgrims traveling on the Manakamana Cable Car between Cheres, Chitwan and the Manakamana Temple in Nepal. The film has been acquired for U.S. distribution by The Cinema Guild.

== Synopsis ==
The film consists entirely of fixed long takes of groups of people (and once, five goats) inside a cable car as it goes up and down a Nepalese mountain. The first trip shows an old man and a young boy that sit next to each other without saying a word. The following groups have a chat, admire the landscape, take selfies, eat ice cream and play instruments.

== Production ==
The film was made by directors Stephanie Spray and Pacho Velez on 16 mm film. It was produced with support from Harvard's Sensory Ethnography Lab. The film uses village locals that effectively "play" themselves. Velez explains that "in terms of direction we talked to everyone before we filmed. We were in a town four-to-five hours away by bus from the cable car; about 80 kilometers. We chose the people, we gave them a ride, we talked to them. Many knew Stephanie previously."

Each shot is about nine minutes, and encompasses the length of the entire 2.8 kilometer ride up to the temple or down. Wanting consistent framing, Nepali carpenters were hired to build a stable wooden base onto which the filmmakers anchored their hi-hat tripod. Some viewers mistakenly believe that Spray and Velez were not present in the cable car during the shooting. In all rides, Velez operated an Aaton 7 LTR camera and Spray recorded sound with a shotgun stereo microphone on a two-channel sound recorder. In the beginning of the film, it seems that the camera stays in place when it arrives at one of the two covered stations, but in fact, a new roll of film is used for each sequence. The film required 26 months from the shoot to the premiere. It was largely shot in June 2011, but the filmmakers had great difficulty getting the film out of Nepal for development.

== Reception ==
The film received positive reviews, earning a 96% rating on the Rotten Tomatoes website based on 51 reviews, with an average score of 7.86. The website's critics consensus reads: "Its tranquil pace will prove jarring for the blockbuster-inclined, but Manakamana rewards patient viewers with a singularly haunting experience." Bilge Ebiri of the New York Magazine (Vulture) said that "it’s the closest I’ve seen a film come to an act of genuine hypnosis." A.A. Dowd of The A.V. Club stated that "the film’s focus is on neither the destination nor the journey, but on the individuals planting themselves in front of the lens". However, some "may find [it] a tough sit". Boyd van Hoeij from The Hollywood Reporter wrote that "the human race finally gets its feature-length close-up". Scott Foundas of Variety concluded that "for all its manipulations and self-imposed restrictions, Manakamana is expansive, intricate and surprisingly playful".

The film garnered "a great deal of buzz" at the 2013 Locarno Film Festival, where it won the Golden Leopard - Filmmakers of the Present.

== See also ==
- Levithan, 2012 film
- Sweetgrass, 2009 film
