= Manakamana (disambiguation) =

Manakamana originally referred to:

- Manakamana Temple, a sacred temple in Gorkha
  - Manakamana Cable Car, gondola lift that goes to the temple

"Manakamana" may also refer to:

- Manakamana, Gorkha, village development committee in Gorkha
- Manakamana, Sankhuwasabha, village development committee in Sankhuwasabha
- Manakamana Temple (Sankhuwasabha), a temple in Sankhuwasabha
- Manakamana, Syangja, village development committee in Syangja
- Manakamana, Nuwakot, village development committee in Nuwakot
- Manakamana (film), 2013 documentary film
- Manakamana Higher Secondary School, a school in Kathmandu
- Manakamana Multiple College, a school in Jhapa
