= Ivan & Ivana =

- Directed by: Jeff Daniel Silva
- Release date: 2011
- Country: United States

Ivan & Ivana is a documentary directed by Jeff Daniel Silva in 2011.

== Synopsis ==
Ivan & Ivana follows a young couple fleeing the Kosovo War. They arrive in California at the height of the housing boom. The film follows their experience as new American immigrants through their economic, political and personal experiences. The film sets the characters among the events of the Kosovo War, while making no judgments about that war.

== Production ==
The film was edited and partially shot at the Sensory Ethnography Lab at Harvard while Silva was teaching the core Sensory Ethnography course with Lucien Castaing-Taylor from 2006 to 2009. Filming for the project began in 2000 in Kosovo, where Silva first met Ivan, whilst recording interviews for Balkan Rhapsodies: 78 Measures of War. Principal production of Ivan & Ivana occurred between 2006 and 2010 in San Diego, Belgrade, Serbia, and Montenegro. After 10 years of production the film premiered at Visions du Réel Documentary Film Festival in Nyon, Switzerland.
