= Balagan (disambiguation) =

A balagan was a temporary structure for seasonal theatrical performances in Russian Empire.

Balagan may also refer to:

== Culture ==
- Balagan (band), Israeli alternative rock band
- Balagan (film), documentary by German director Andres Veiel about the Jewish-Palestinian acting troupe Akko
- Balagan (magazine), Israeli Russophone humorous magazine
- Balagan (TV show), Israeli TV show
- Balagan Film Series, nonprofit organization that organized screenings of underground and experimental films in Boston, Massachusetts
- Balagan Limited, Russian music group
- "Balagan", musical composition by Mikhail Gnessin

== Fictional characters ==
- Arkady Balagan, fictional former World Chess Champion in Canadian TV series Endgame
- Balagan, recurring character in American comic book PS238
- Pan Bałagan, character from the Polish animated film series Bajki pana Bałagana

== Populated places ==
- Balagan, former name of Janatan, village in Kazakhstan
- Balagan, Donetsk Oblast, village in Ukraine

== Other ==
- Balagan (dwelling), winter dwelling of Yakuts made of logs

== See also ==
- Ballagan
