= Jeff Silva =

Jeff Silva may refer to:

- Jeff Silva (footballer) (born 1986), Brazilian football player
- Jeff Daniel Silva, Boston, Massachusetts filmmaker
