= Caniba (film) =

2017 French documentary film

- American release poster
- Directed by: Véréna Paravel; Lucien Castaing-Taylor
- Produced by: Véréna Paravel; Lucien Castaing-Taylor
- Starring: Issei Sagawa
- Cinematography: Véréna Paravel; Lucien Castaing-Taylor
- Edited by: Véréna Paravel; Lucien Castaing-Taylor
- Production companies: Norte Productions; Sensory Ethnography Lab; Centre national du cinéma et de l'image animée; Cinéventure 3; Sundance Institute; Elle Driver
- Distributed by: Norte Productions (France); Grasshopper Film (United States)
- Release date: September 4, 2017 (Venice)
- Running time: 92 minutes
- Countries: France; United States
- Languages: Japanese; French; English

Caniba is a 2017 French documentary film produced, filmed, edited and directed by Véréna Paravel and Lucien Castaing-Taylor, capturing the notorious Japanese cannibal Issei Sagawa's late life as a free man.

The film had its world premiere in the Orizzonti section of the 74th Venice International Film Festival on 4 September 2017, where it was awarded the Special Jury Prize.

== Reception ==
Caniba won numerous awards at film festivals, but received a mixed reaction from critics, with many critics made highly uncomfortable by the film's detached, amoral examination of its deeply mentally disturbed subject. The New York Times found the film to be "an exercise in intellectualized scab-picking" and its subject "repellant". Variety described Caniba as "a film made for post-screening debates on the liberal-minded documentary circuit, though what, if any, commercial potential distributors might see in it is another question." RogerEbert.com stated that the film was "undeniably fascinating", but had some reservations about its approach: "Victims too rarely get to tell their stories. I don't know that what we need right now is to sympathize with monsters." Slant Magazine, in a three-out-of-four-star review, praised the film's "fundamental openness toward its subject by creating free space for engagement and contemplation", but felt that it "broaches ethical questions that it lacks the resources to address" and that "With no push to either interrogate or contextualize the man, the cool ethnographer’s detachment of the film comes to take on a sensationalistic tenor."
