= Jeff Daniel Silva =

Filmmaker

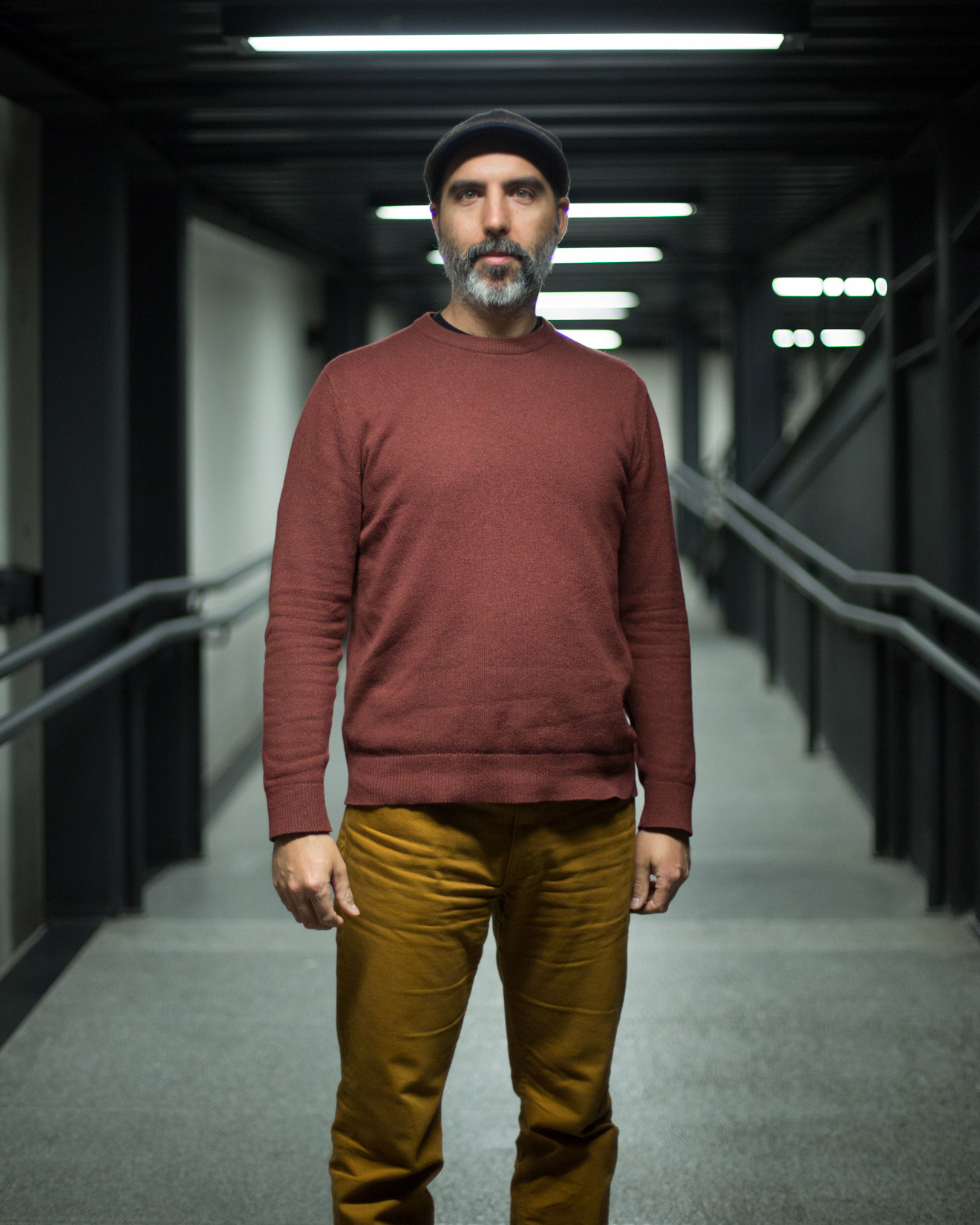
Jeff Daniel Silva on 2015.

Jeff (Daniel) Silva is a Boston filmmaker and film programmer. Ivan & Ivana (2011) and Balkan Rhapsodies: 78 Measures of War (2008), have been exhibited at film festivals and museums internationally, including MoMA's Documentary Fortnight, The Viennale, Visions du Reel, Valdivia, Flahertiana, and DocAviv.. In 2016, he worked on Linefork, a feature about Lee Sexton. Silva programmed experimental and documentary cinema for 15 years at the Balagan Film Series, which he co-founded in 2000 with Alla Kovgan. He was a teaching fellow at Harvard University and one of founders of the Sensory Ethnography Lab alongside Lucien Castaing-Taylor. Silva also taught at the School of the Museum of Fine Arts (SMFA) in Boston.

== Filmography ==
- Without A Map (1996)
- Irish Whiskey (1997)
- Movement (R)evolution Africa (2007)
- Balkan Rhapsodies: 78 Measures of War (2008)
- Ivan & Ivana (2011)
- Linefork (2016) a portrait of Lee Sexton co-directed by Vic Rawlings, Jeff Daniel Silva
- From the Land (2018) (co-directed by Ramona Badescu (author), Jeff Daniel Silva)
- The Order of Things (2022) co-directed by (Ramona Badescu (author), Jeff Daniel Silva)
