= La folie (album) =

Studio album by the Stranglers
- Released: 9 November 1981
- Recorded: August–September 1981
- Studio: The Manor Studio (Shipton-on-Cherwell)
- Genre: New wave
- Length: 41:27
- Label: Liberty
- Producer: The Stranglers; Steve Churchyard

The Stranglers chronology
The Gospel According to the Meninblack (1981)	La folie (1981)	Feline (1983)

Singles from La folie
- 1. "Let Me Introduce You to the Family" Released: 2 November 1981; 2. "Golden Brown" Released: 11 January 1982; 3. "La folie" Released: 20 April 1982

La folie is the sixth studio album by the English new wave band the Stranglers. It was released on 9 November 1981, through the EMI record label Liberty.

== Background ==
The Stranglers had initially been the most commercially successful band of the punk/new wave period in Britain, but by 1981, their success had waned noticeably. La folie was a conscious attempt to deliver a more commercial product. It is co-produced by the band with engineer Steve Churchyard and mixed by Tony Visconti. The band's record company, EMI, gave Visconti a brief to mix each song as a potential single.

The album's French language title (pronounced [la fɔ.li]) literally translates to "madness". In various interviews, the band related that this referred to "The Madness of Love" and that conceptually, each of the songs on the album was intended to explore a different kind or aspect of "love". The title track is based upon the story of Issei Sagawa. Guitarist Hugh Cornwell related in his 2001 book The Stranglers – Song by Song that the correct title of the album's opening track was "Non Stop Nun", and he apparently had been unaware that the record company had printed it as simply "Non Stop".

The lyrics to "Ain't Nothin' to It" are credited to American jazz clarinetist and saxophonist Mezz Mezzrow. The band compiled expressions from Mezzrow's autobiography Really the Blues, which contains many passages of jive talk, and used them for the lyrics of the song.

There has been much controversy surrounding the lyrics to "Golden Brown". In The Stranglers – Song by Song, Cornwell states, ""Golden Brown" works on two levels. It's about heroin and also about a girl". Essentially, the lyrics describe how "both provided me with pleasurable times".

== Release and reception ==
Professional ratings
Review scores
Source	Rating
AllMusic	3/5 stars
Encyclopedia of Popular Music	4/5 stars
The Great Rock Discography	7/10
Record Collector	4/5 stars
Rock 82	(favorable)

La folie was preceded by the release of the album's first single, "Let Me Introduce You to the Family", released on 7 November 1981 and reaching No. 42 in the UK Singles Chart. La folie was released two days later.

Upon its release, La folie looked set to be the band's lowest-charting album, but, buoyed by the success of the album's second single, "Golden Brown", released 10 January 1982 and reaching No. 2 in the singles chart, the album eventually peaked at No. 11 in the UK Albums Chart, spending eighteen weeks in the chart. The single would go on to become EMI's highest-selling single for many years.

One more single was released from the album, the album's title track "La folie", on 20 April 1982. "Tramp" was originally thought to be the ideal follow-up to their Top Ten hit single, "Golden Brown". However, Jean-Jacques Burnel convinced fellow band members that the album title track, "La Folie" was a much better choice. This backfired when "La Folie" only peaked at No. 47 on the UK Singles Chart.

Trouser Press wrote of the album: "Subtle, effective, mature and energetic – but no outstanding songs." AllMusic called it a fine and welcome album in the Stranglers' body of work, describing it as "mainly a collection of tight, punchy songs that often suggest the forthright approach of American new wave bands."

== Track listing ==
All tracks are written and arranged by the Stranglers (Hugh Cornwell, Jean-Jacques Burnel, Dave Greenfield and Jet Black), except where noted.

Side one
No.	Title	Lyrics	Length
1.	"Non Stop"		2:29
2.	"Everybody Loves You When You're Dead"		2:41
3.	"Tramp"		3:04
4.	"Let Me Introduce You to the Family"		3:07
5.	"Ain't Nothin' to It"	Milton "Mezz" Mezzrow	3:56
6.	"The Man They Love to Hate"		4:22

Side two
No.	Title	Length
7.	"Pin Up"	2:46
8.	"It Only Takes Two to Tango"	3:37
9.	"Golden Brown"	3:28
10.	"How to Find True Love and Happiness in the Present Day"	3:04
11.	"La folie"	6:04
Total length:		41:27

2001 CD reissue bonus tracks (EMI)
No.	Title	Writer(s)	Origin	Length
12.	"Cruel Garden"		B-side of "Strange Little Girl"	2:14
13.	"Cocktail Nubiles^{a}"	The Stranglers, Johnny Richards, Carolyn Leigh	B-side of "Tomorrow Was the Hereafter", 1980	7:08
14.	"Vietnamerica"		B-side of "Let Me Introduce You to the Family" ^{b}	4:01
15.	"Love 30"		B-side of "Golden Brown"	3:55
16.	"You Hold the Key to My Love in Your Hands" (1981 demo)		Hits and Heroes, 1999	2:40
17.	"Strange Little Girl"	Black, Burnel, Cornwell, Greenfield, Hans Wärmling	Non-album single, 1982	2:40
Total length:				56:17

- ^a"Cocktail Nubiles" is a loungey version of "Bring on the Nubiles" from No More Heroes, using the music from the Frank Sinatra pop standard "Young at Heart". It was recorded during sessions for The Gospel According to the Meninblack in 1980. "Cocktail Nubiles" was released on the exclusive fan club release "Tomorrow Was the Hereafter".
- ^bOriginally released on the 1980 compilation album IV (US and Canada only).

2018 CD reissue bonus tracks (Parlophone)
No.	Title	Writer(s)	Origin	Length
12.	"Vietnamerica"		B-side of "Let Me Introduce You to the Family"	4:01
13.	"Love 30"		B-side of "Golden Brown"	3:55
14.	"Waltzinblack"		B-side of "La folie" ^{c}	3:39
15.	"Strange Little Girl"	Black, Burnel, Cornwell, Greenfield, Wärmling	Non-album single	2:40
16.	"Cruel Garden"		B-side of "Strange Little Girl"	2:14
17.	"You Hold the Key to My Love in Your Hands" (1981 demo)		Hits and Heroes	2:40
18.	"La folie" (edit)		DJ-edit release	3:45
Total length:				62:14

- ^cOriginally from The Gospel According to the Meninblack.

=== 2018 expanded vinyl edition ===
Self-released by the Stranglers, La folie received a deluxe vinyl reissue in 2018, limited to 1000 numbered copies. The original 11-track album is coupled with a bonus 12-track album, entitled Extra Texture, the first side of which features non-album single "Strange Little Girl", associated B-sides, a radio edit, a demo, and a BBC radio session track. The second side collects 6 La folie tracks recorded live by the BBC on the La folie tour at the Hammersmith Odeon in London on 8 February 1982.

- Side one and two as per original vinyl edition

Extra Texture

Side three
No.	Title	Writer(s)	Origin	Length
1.	"The Man They Love to Hate" (BBC Radio 1 session, 24 January 1982^{d})		The Radio 1 Sessions - The Evening Show, 1989	3:45
2.	"Strange Little Girl"	Black, Burnel, Cornwell, Greenfield, Wärmling	Non-album single	2:40
3.	"Cruel Garden"		B-side of "Strange Little Girl"	2:14
4.	"Love 30"		B-side of "Golden Brown"	3:55
5.	"La folie" (single edit)		Promo single, 1982	3:30
6.	"You Hold the Key to My Love in Your Hands" (demo)		Hits and Heroes	2:40

- ^dFirst transmitted on 11 February 1982 on the David Jensen Evening Show.

Live at Hammersmith Odeon

Side four
No.	Title	Origin	Length
7.	"Non Stop" (live)	In Concert, 1982	2:27
8.	"The Man They Love to Hate" (live)	In Concert	4:45
9.	"Golden Brown" (live)	In Concert	3:40
10.	"How to Find True Love and Happiness in the Present Day" (live)	In Concert	4:05
11.	"Let Me Introduce You to the Family" (live)	In Concert	3:05
12.	"Tramp" (live)	In Concert	2:55

== Personnel ==
The Stranglers

- Hugh Cornwell – guitar, lead and backing vocals
- Dave Greenfield – keyboards
- Jean-Jacques Burnel – bass, backing vocals, lead vocals on "The Man They Love to Hate" and "La folie", co-lead vocals on "It Only Takes Two to Tango"
- Jet Black – drums, percussion

Technical

- The Stranglers – producer, cover concept
- Steve Churchyard – producer, engineer
- Tony Visconti – mixing
- Jay Pee – art direction
- Phil Jude – front cover photography
- Ava Carrier – back cover photography
- Shoot That Tiger! – liner sleeve

Bonus tracks

- Dale Griffin – producer on "The Man They Love to Hate"" (BBC radio session)
- The Stranglers – producer on "Vietnamerica" and "Waltzinblack"
- Tony Visconti – producer on "You Hold the Key to My Love in Your Hands"
- Steve Churchyard – mixing on "Love 30"

== Charts ==
Chart	Peak Position
UK Albums Chart	11
Dutch Albums Chart	13
