= Symeon Cosburn =

- Origin: Essex, England
- Genres: Jazz
- Occupation: Singer-songwriter
- Years active: 1997–present
- Label: OT Records
- Website: www.symeoncosburn.com

Symeon Cosburn is an English jazz singer from London. He is best known for his modernised jazz music and cover of The Stranglers song "Golden Brown.”

Symeon released a thirteen-track album entitled Breakfast with the Blues during 2006, primarily devoted to his mother, who died of a terminal illness. The album was produced by Ian Shaw.

During February 2007 he began work on his second album.
