= Lee Sexton =

American musician (1928–2021)

Lee Sexton (March 23, 1928 – February 10, 2021) was an American banjoist from Letcher County, Kentucky. He began playing the banjo at the age of eight and was proficient in the two-finger picking and "drop-thumb" (clawhammer) traditional styles of east Kentucky. He also sang and played fiddle. His Whoa Mule album includes recordings from a 1952 home recording with fiddler Fernando Lusk to recordings made in 2001. Four solo songs also appear on Smithsonian Folkways album Mountain Music of Kentucky.

In 1999, Kentucky governor Paul Patton presented Lee with the Governor's Award in the Arts.

== Career ==
Lee Sexton worked as a field hand to earn the $1 he needed to buy his first banjo when he was eight years old. He received lessons from his father and uncles, one of whom was Morgan Sexton, the revered banjo player with a liquid and serene two-finger picking style. Growing up, Lee worked in the mines during the week and played his banjo on weekends, usually for house parties or corn shuckings. When Sexton was 23 years old, his right hand was crushed in a mining accident, forcing him to start playing the banjo with a new style of drop thumbing that he developed himself. By the 1940s, he had migrated his career to the radio. In 1988, he released his EP titled "Whoa Mule"; it was later turned into a CD in 2004.

== Family ==
Lee Sexton was married to Opal Sexton. Together they had no children, but Lee had 2 sons from a previous marriage. The oldest, Johnny, is an ordained minister. The youngest, Phillip, continued to pursue a musical interest with his father until his untimely death in September 2000.

== Documentary ==
An immersive, feature-length documentary film, Linefork, was made with Lee and his wife Opal in their home and community. The film was directed by Jeff Silva and Vic Rawlings and is a project of Sensory Ethnography Lab. The working title for the film was Lee and Opal.

Lee can also be seen playing banjo and discussing his coal-mining days in the BBC documentary "Searching For The Wrong-Eyed Jesus".

== Discography ==
- Whoa Mule (June Appal JA0051, 1988) (June Appal JA0080D, 2001)
- Lee Sexton & Family (Field Recorders' Collective FRC105, 2006)
