= Issei Sagawa =

Japanese murderer and cannibal (1949–2022)

- 佐川 一政
- Issei Sagawa in 2011
- Born: 26 April 1949; Kobe, Japan
- Died: 24 November 2022 (aged 73); Tokyo, Japan
- Education: Institut national des langues et civilisations orientales, Wako University, University of Paris
- Occupation: Author
- Criminal charges: Murder, cannibalism (identified as attempted rape by officials)
- Criminal status: Deceased

Issei Sagawa (佐川 一政, Sagawa Issei; 26 April 1949 – 24 November 2022) also known as Pang or the Kobe Cannibal, was a Japanese lust murderer, cannibal, and necrophiliac known for the killing of Renée Hartevelt in Paris in 1981. He murdered Hartevelt and then mutilated, cannibalized, and performed necrophilia on her corpse over several days. In France, Sagawa was judged to be legally insane and ordered to be held indefinitely in a mental institution. After a few years, he was deported to Japan, where psychologists from Matsuzawa Hospital examined him and unanimously concluded that he was sane. He therefore had to be released from the hospital in 1986.

Since the criminal case in France had been closed and the court records were not made available to the Japanese authorities, Sagawa was not again put on trial and spent the rest of his life a free man. While this was widely criticized as an example of obstruction of justice, he became a minor celebrity in Japan and made a living through the public's interest in his crime.

== Early life ==
Issei Sagawa was born on 26 April 1949 in Kobe, Hyōgo Prefecture, to wealthy parents. Sagawa's father, Akira Sagawa, was a businessman who had served as president of Kurita Water Industries, and his grandfather had been an editor for The Asahi Shimbun. Sagawa was born prematurely and, reportedly, was small enough to fit in the palm of his father's hand. He immediately developed enteritis, a disease of the small intestine. Sagawa eventually recovered after several injections of potassium and calcium in saline.

Sagawa's fragile health and introverted personality led to him developing a strong interest in literature. Sagawa first experienced cannibalistic desires while in the first grade, after seeing a male's thigh. In a 2011 interview with Vice, Sagawa reported that, in his youth, he committed bestiality on his dog and experienced cannibalistic desires for women.

At the age of 24, while attending Wako University in Tokyo, Sagawa followed a tall German woman home, and then broke into her apartment while she was sleeping. Sagawa's intention was to cannibalize her by slicing off part of her buttocks and sneaking away with a small part of her flesh, but she awoke and, according to Sagawa, thwarted his attack and pushed him to the ground. Sagawa was captured by police and charged with attempted rape, and did not confess his true intentions to authorities.

In 1977, at the age of 28, Sagawa moved to France to pursue a Ph.D. in literature at the Sorbonne in Paris. Sagawa has said that while residing in Paris, "Almost every night I would bring a prostitute home and then try to shoot them, but for some reason my fingers froze up and I couldn't pull the trigger."

== Killing of Renée Hartevelt ==
On 11 June 1981, Sagawa, then 32, invited his Sorbonne classmate Renée Hartevelt, a Dutch woman, to dinner at his apartment at 10 Rue Erlanger, under the pretext of translating poetry for a school assignment. Sagawa planned to kill and eat her, having selected her for her health and beauty, characteristics he felt he lacked. Sagawa considered himself weak, ugly, and small (he was 145 cm [4 ft 9 in] tall) and claimed he wanted to absorb her energy. She was 25 years old and 178 cm (5 ft 10 in).

After Hartevelt arrived, she began reading poetry at a desk with her back to Sagawa when he shot her in the neck with a rifle. Sagawa said he fainted after the shock of shooting her but awoke with the realization that he had to carry out his plan. Sagawa raped her corpse, but he could not bite into her skin because his teeth were not sharp enough, so he left the apartment and purchased a butcher knife. Sagawa consumed various parts of Hartevelt's body, eating most of her breasts, face, buttocks, feet, thighs, and neck, either raw or cooked (even admitting that he swallowed her clitoris whole, due to her being on her period at the time, and him not liking the smell of menstrual blood), while saving other parts in his refrigerator. Sagawa also took photographs of Hartevelt's body at each eating stage. Once the remains of her body that he did not consume started decomposing, Sagawa attempted to dump the remains of Hartevelt's corpse in a lake in the Bois de Boulogne park, carrying her dismembered body parts in two suitcases, but was caught in the act and arrested by French police four days later.

Sagawa's wealthy father provided a lawyer for his defence. After being held for two years awaiting trial, Sagawa was found legally insane and unfit to stand trial by the French judge, Jean-Louis Bruguière, who ordered him to be held indefinitely in a mental institution. After a visit by the author Inuhiko Yomota, Sagawa's account of the murder and its aftermath was published in Japan under the title In the Fog. Sagawa's subsequent publicity and macabre celebrity likely contributed to the French authorities' decision to deport him to Japan, where he was immediately committed to Matsuzawa Hospital in Tokyo. His examining psychologists all declared him sane and found sexual perversion was his sole motivation for murder. As the charges against Sagawa in France had been dropped, the French court documents were sealed and were not released to Japanese authorities; consequently, Sagawa could not legally be detained in Japan. Sagawa checked himself out of the hospital on 12 August 1986 and subsequently remained free until his death. Sagawa's continued freedom was widely criticized.

== Post-release ==
Between 1986 and 1997, Sagawa was frequently invited to be a guest speaker and commentator. In 1992, he made a cameo appearance in Hisayasu Sato's exploitation film The Bedroom. Sagawa wrote books about the murder he committed, as well as Shonen A, a book on the 1997 Kobe child murders. He also wrote restaurant reviews for the Japanese magazine Spa.

In 2005, Sagawa's parents died. He was prevented from attending their funeral but repaid their creditors and moved into public housing. He received welfare benefits for a time. In an interview with Vice magazine in 2011, he said that being forced to make a living while being known as a murderer and cannibal was a terrible punishment. In 2013, Sagawa was hospitalized from a cerebral infarction, which permanently damaged his nervous system. He later lived alone and needed daily assistance, which was provided by his younger brother or by caregivers. At the time, he claimed to have regretted the obsession.

He died from complications of pneumonia at a hospital in Tokyo, on 24 November 2022, at the age of 73.

== In popular culture ==
Media inspired by, featuring, or depicting Sagawa include:

- Interview with a Cannibal (Vice, US, 2011, 34 minutes)
- The Bedroom (Hisayasu Satō, Japan, 1992, 64 minutes), a pink film starring Sagawa as Mr. Takano.
- Caniba (Véréna Paravel and Lucien Castaing-Taylor, France, 2017, 97 minutes)
- Adoration, a short 1986 film by Olivier Smolders, is based on Sagawa's story.
- "La Folie", a 1981 song by The Stranglers, was inspired by Sagawa's story.
- "Too Much Blood", a song on the Rolling Stones' 1983 album Undercover, is about Sagawa and violence in the media.
- Issei Sagawa, a 2007 EP by Gnaw Their Tongues.
