= Let Me Introduce You to the Family =

Single by The Stranglers

from the album La Folie
- B-side: "Vietnamerica"
- Released: 2 November 1981
- Genre: Post-punk
- Length: 3:10
- Label: Liberty Records
- Songwriters: Hugh Cornwell, Jean-Jacques Burnel, Dave Greenfield, Jet Black
- Producers: The Stranglers, Steve Churchyard

The Stranglers singles chronology
"Just Like Nothing On Earth" (1981)	"Let Me Introduce You to the Family" (1981)	"Golden Brown" (1982)

"Let Me Introduce You to the Family" is a 1981 song by English rock band The Stranglers. The first single released from La Folie, it peaked at number 42 in the UK Singles Chart.
