= Kurita Water Industries =

Japanese water treatment company

Kurita Water Industries Ltd.

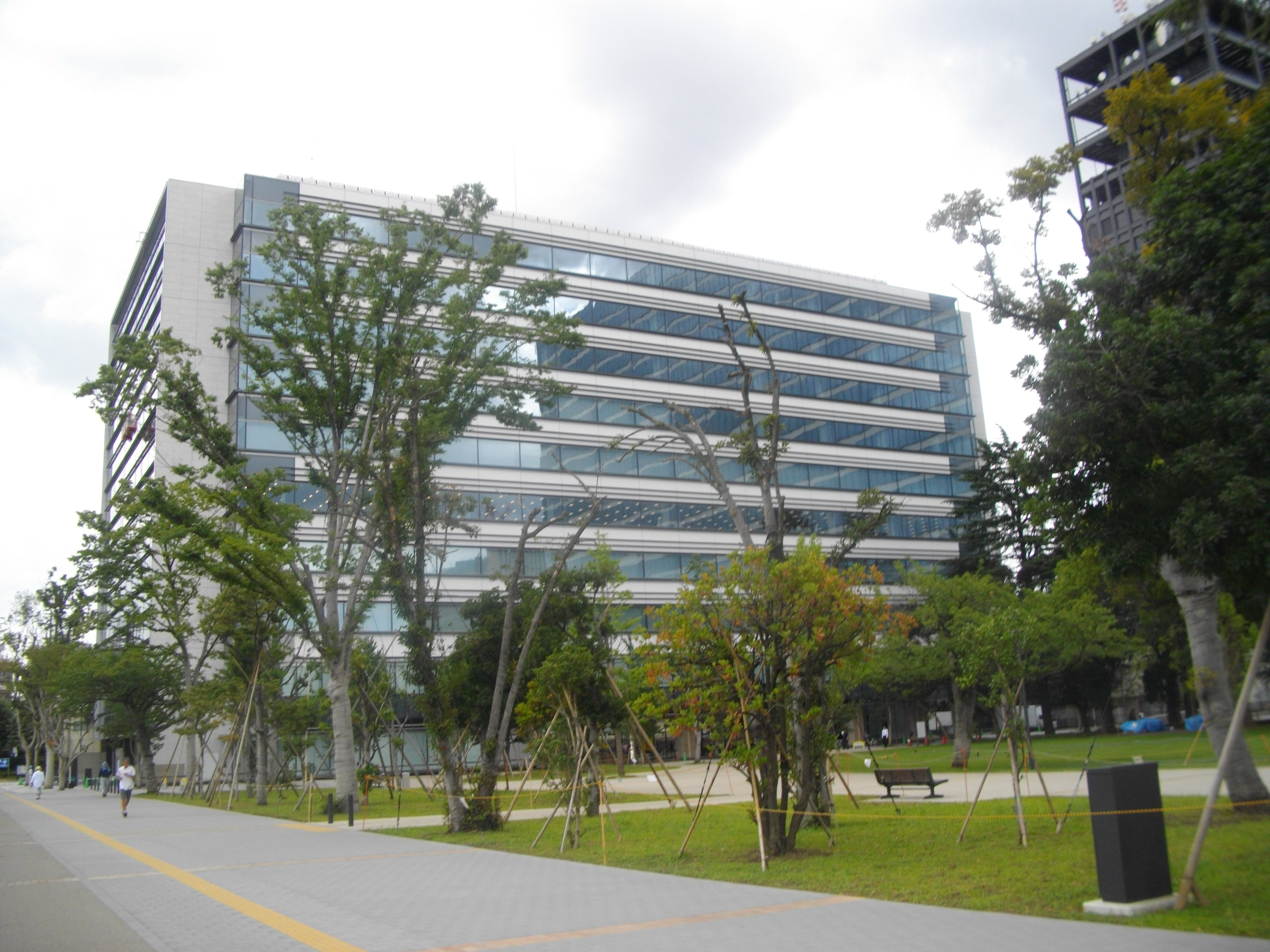
- Company headquarters building
- Native name: 栗田工業株式会社
- Type: Public KK
- Traded as: TYO: 6370
- Industry: Machinery
- Founded: Tokyo (July 13, 1949; 77 years ago)
- Founder: Haruo Kurita
- Headquarters: Nakano-ku, Tokyo 164-0001, Japan
- Area served: Worldwide
- Key people: Michiya Kadota (President)
- Products: Water treatment facilities and chemicals
- Services: Maintenance of water treatment facilities; Soil and groundwater remediation; Analysis of water quality
- Revenue: ▲JPY 189.3 billion (FY 2014) (US$ 1.57 billion) (FY 2014)
- Net income: ▲JPY 10.4 billion (FY 2014) (US$ 86.6 million) (FY 2014)
- Number of employees: 5,222 (as of March 31, 2015)
- Website: www.kurita.co.jp/english/

Kurita Water Industries Ltd. (栗田工業株式会社, Kurita Kōgyō Kabushiki-gaisha) is a Japanese manufacturer, providing water treatment chemicals and facilities as well as process treatment chemicals. During the 1950s Kurita Water Industries expanded the portfolio and started with the water treatment facilities business, chemical cleaning business (Kurita Engineering Co., Ltd.) and maintenance services. In its second decade, the 1960s, Kurita Water Industries entered the process treatment market, especially in the pulp and paper, petrochemical and steel industries. Since the mid of the 1970s up to now, Kurita Water Industries established 14 overseas subsidiaries and affiliates. Since 2003 Kurita Water Industries is listed in the Nature Stock Index (NAI = Natur-Aktien-Index).

== History ==
The company was founded in 1949 upon chemical water treatment business (boiler water treatment chemicals). The founder of the company, Haruo Kurita, who had previously served in the Japanese navy, started selling boiler water treatment chemicals based on the navy boiler technology.

In 1951 Kurita entered into water treatment facilities business and established its first R&D center. Two years later the company expanded their offering by starting the chemical cleaning business while 1958 saw Kurita expanding their maintenance services. In 1961 the company was listed on the second section of the Tokyo Stock Exchange and the Osaka Securities Exchange and a year later the company stock was listed on the first section of the aforementioned stock exchanges. By 1962 the company established its second R&D center which resulted in expanding their product line by adding new chemical products for process treatment.

In 1973 Kurita forayed into the electronics industry and in the 1980s established a third R&D center and deployed a tool cleaning business.

The company's soil remediation business was launched in 1991 and ten years later, in 2001, the company started offering consulting services for hedging soil pollution risks. Land Solution Inc., a Kurita subsidiary, was established as a consulting company dealing in soil remediation. 2002 saw the launch of ultrapure water supply business and in 2004 Kurita entered the Chinese market by establishing Kurita Water Industries (Suzhou) Ltd. A year later a fourth R&D center, the Kurita Global Technology Center, opened in Nogi, Tochigi.

Focusing on growth, the company acquired the Water, Paper and Aluminum compounds business from BK Giulini and founded Kurita Europe APW GmbH.

== Products ==
Facilities	Chemicals
Ultrapure water production systems	Boiler water treatment chemicals
Water treatment systems	Cooling water treatment chemicals
Wastewater treatment systems	Wastewater treatment chemicals
Wastewater reclamation systems	Process treatment chemicals
	Equipment and systems for water treatment chemicals
	Contract-based services

== Business fields ==
- Supply of water treatment facilities
- Supply of water and process treatment chemicals
- Soil and groundwater remediation
- Operation and maintenance of water treatment facilities, chemical cleaning, tool cleaning, manufacture and sale of products for general households, analysis of water quality

== Notable Members ==
Akira Sagawa, a former president of Kurita Water Industries, is the father of Issei Sagawa, a cannibal and murderer.
