= Pomelo the Garden Elephant =

Series of French children's books

Pomelo the Garden Elephant is a series of French children's books about a tiny elephant who lives under a dandelion and has many misadventures because his trunk is unusually long. Pomelo first appeared in the children's book Pomelo est bien sous son pissenlit in 2003. Written by Ramona Badescu and with illustrations by Benjamin Chaud, the book was first published in France by Albin Michel Jeunesse and has been translated into twelve languages.

Since the success of Pomelo est bien sous son pissenlit, Badescu and Chaud continue to collaborate in writing and illustrating a total of 13 books in the Pomelo the Garden Elephant series. In 2001 Enchanted Lion Books acquired the US rights to translate and publish the series and has released 4 books which have garnered critical attention in the New York Times and other publications.

== French titles ==
- Pomelo se souvient. Paris: Albin Michel Jeunesse, 2017.
- Pomelo et l'incroyable trésor. Paris: Albin Michel Jeunesse, 2015.
- Pomelo et les formes. Paris: Albin Michel Jeunesse, 2013.
- Pomelo et la grande aventure. Paris: Albin Michel Jeunesse, 2012. Translated in Korean and English.
- Pomelo et les contraires. Paris: Albin Michel Jeunesse, 2011.
- Pomelo et les couleurs. Paris: Albin Michel Jeunesse, 2011.Translated in English, Korean, Swedish and Spanish.
- Pomelo grandit. Paris: Albin Michel Jeunesse, 2010. Translated in Swedish, Korean, English, Greek, Norwegian and Spanish.
- Pomelo voyage. Paris: Albin Michel Jeunesse, 2009.Translated in Spanish, Italian, Korean and Chinese.
- Pomelo s’en va de l’autre côté du jardin. Paris: Albin Michel Jeunesse, 2007. Translated in Korean, Spanish and Chinese.
- Pomelo se demande. Paris: Albin Michel Jeunesse, 2006. Translated in Spanish, Italian, Korean and Chinese.
- Pomelo est amoureux. Paris: Albin Michel Jeunesse, 2004. Translated in Italian, Spanish, Chinese, Korean, Polish and Swedish.
- Pomelo rêve. Paris: Albin Michel Jeunesse, 2004. Translated on Spanish, Italian, Korean, Polish and Chinese.
- Pomelo est bien sous son pissenlit. Paris: Albin Michel Jeunesse, 2003. Translated in twelve languages.

== English titles ==
- Pomelo Begins to Grow (2011) Enchanted Lion Books ISBN 978-1-59270-111-7
- Pomelo Explores Color (2012) Enchanted Lion Books ISBN 978-1-59270-126-1
- Pomelo's Opposites (2013) Enchanted Lion Books ISBN 978-1-59270-132-2
- Pomelo's Big Adventure (2014) Enchanted Lion Books ISBN 978-1-59270-158-2
