= La folie (song) =

Single by The Stranglers

from the album La folie
- B-side: "Waltzinblack"
- Released: 20 April 1982 (UK)
- Length: 6:11
- Label: Liberty Records
- Songwriters: Hugh Cornwell, Jean-Jacques Burnel, Dave Greenfield, Jet Black,
- Producers: The Stranglers, Steve Churchyard

The Stranglers singles chronology
"Golden Brown" (1981)	"La folie" (1982)	"Strange Little Girl" (1982)

"La folie" is a 1981 song by The Stranglers. The title track from La folie, it was released as the follow-up to "Golden Brown" in April 1982, and peaked at number 47 in the UK Singles Chart. Sung in French by bassist Jean-Jacques Burnel, it was Burnel who convinced his bandmates of the song's potential as a single, despite Hugh Cornwell feeling that "Tramp" was the better choice. The song makes allusions to Japanese necrophiliac murderer and cannibal Issei Sagawa.

The music video was filmed on the Montmartre.
