= Aryo Danusiri =

Indonesian film director

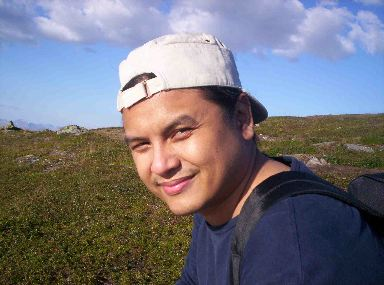
- Born: September 26, 1973 (age 52); Jakarta, Indonesia
- Website: www.ragam.org

Aryo Danusiri (born 26 September 1973) is an Indonesian film director.

He started his first documentary, Village Goat Takes The Beating, about Aceh human rights violations, in 1999. This documentary was an official selection at the 2001 Amnesty Film Festival in Amsterdam. Since then, he has directed ethnographic films, documentaries and short films about human rights and multicultural problems in Indonesia. They have been screened at various festivals including the Royal Anthropological Institute (RAI) Film Festival in the United Kingdom, the Margaret Mead Film Festival in the United States, as well as festivals in Singapore, Brisbane, Taiwan and Rotterdam. His three documentaries on Aceh have been released on DVD for international distribution by Monash University (Between Three World Project, 2005).

In 2005, he finished his master's degree in visual cultural studies from Tromso University, Norway, with an ethno-documentary about West Papua called Lukas' Moment. This film received the "Best Student Film" award at the RAI Ethnographic Film Festival, UK. He began his Ph.D. studies in visual anthropology at Harvard University with a grant from the Fulbright Program. Playing Between Elephants is his first feature-length documentary and won the Human Rights Award at the 2007 Jakarta International Film Festival.

== Filmography ==
- On Broadway (2010) produced at Sensory Ethnography Lab, Harvard University
- Playing Between Elephants (Di Antara Gajah-gajah) (2007)
- Lukas' Moment (2005)
- Abracadabra! (2003)
- The Poet of Linge Homeland (Penyair Negeri Linge) (2000)
- Village Goat Takes The Beating (Kambing Kampung Yang Kena Pukul) (1999)
