= Manakamana Temple =

Temple in Gorkha, Nepal

Manakamana Mandir (Temple)
- मनकामना मन्दिर
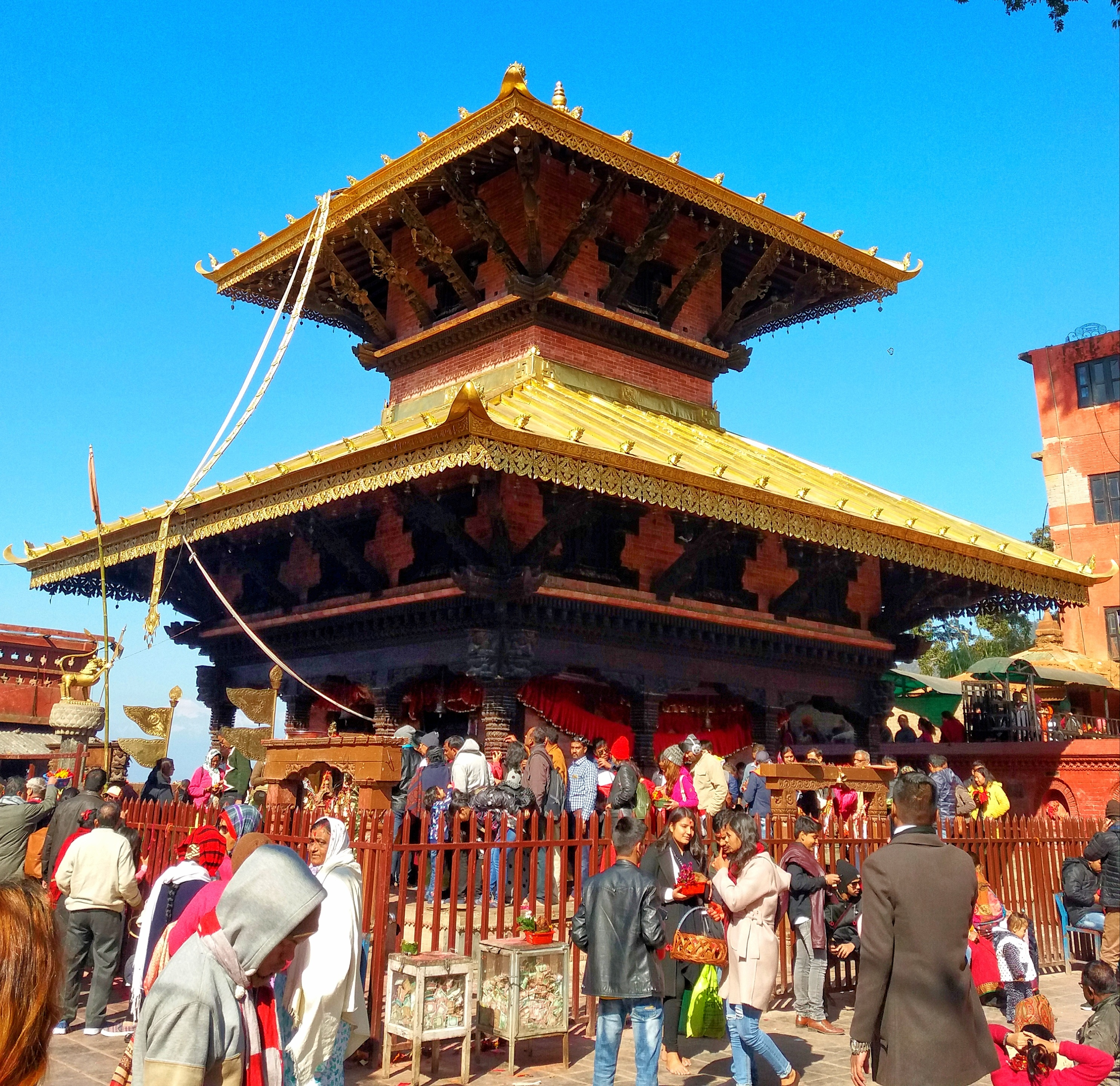
- Manakamana Mandir (Temple) in 2019

- Location in Nepal Manakamana Temple (Nepal)

Religion
- Affiliation: Hinduism
- District: Gorkha
- Province: Gandaki
- Deity: Bhagawati, an incarnation of Durga/Mahalakshmi
- Festivals: Durga Ashtami, Dashain

Location
- Location: Sahid Lakhan Rural Municipality
- Country: Nepal
- Interactive map of Manakamana Mandir (Temple)
- Coordinates: 27°54′16.2″N 84°35′03.3″E

Architecture
- Type: Pagoda
- Completed: 17th Century
- Elevation: 1,300 m (4,265 ft)

Manakamana Temple (Nepali: मनकामना मन्दिर, IAST: Manakāmanā Mandira, lit. 'temple that grants wishes of its devotees') is a Hindu temple dedicated to goddess Bhagwati, an incarnation of Lakshmi. It is located in the village of Manakamana in Gorkha District, Gandaki Province, Nepal founded by Arman Rayamajhi in 1678.

== Location, architecture and shrines ==
The Manakamana Temple is located 1,300 metres (4,300 ft) above sea level on the Kafakdada Hill which sits in the confluence between Trishuli and Marsyangdi in the Sahid Lakhan Rural Municipality in Gorkha, Gandaki Province, Nepal. It is approximately 106 kilometres (66 mi) west of Kathmandu, the capital of Nepal, and about 94 kilometres (58 mi) east of Pokhara. Many mountains can be seen from the hill including Annapurna II, Lamjung Himal, and Baudha which is part of Manaslu, the eighth-highest mountain in the world. By hiking from Anbu Khaireni Rural Municipality it takes about three hours to reach Manakamana which is about 1,000 metres (3,300 ft) away. Alternatively, pilgrims can take the Manakamana Cable Car which was built in 1998 for about US$7.5 million.

It is a two-story temple built in the traditional Nepalese pagoda style, features an ambulatory outside, and spans over 7,659 ropani (3.8930 Square kilometres) of land.

== Legend ==
According to Nepali legend, Manakamana Temple was built in the 17th century during the reign of two Kings of Gorkha, Ram Shah or Prithvipati Shah. The Queen of Gorkha possessed "divine powers" of Manakamana which was only known by the priest Lakhan Thapa of Magar origin. One fine day, the king saw his wife in form of Goddess Manakamana, and priest as a lion, after he told her about this the king mysteriously died. Per historical Hindu practice of Sati, the queen sacrificed herself by sitting atop her deceased husband's funeral pyre. Prior to her death, she told St. Lakhan Thapa Magar that she would appear again. Six months later, a farmer working on the field split a stone which apparently started a stream of blood and milk. After hearing about this, St. Lakhan Thapa Magar went to the location where the stone was located and started to perform Hindu tantric rituals which halted the stream.

Later he built a shrine at the same spot so that their wishes can come true. As per the tradition, the priest of the temple should necessarily be a descendant of Saint Lakhan Thapa Magar, who is described as a spiritual guide for Ram Shah. In the Manakamana Temple, it is mandatory for a priest to be a Magar. Manakamana is thought to be Champawati, wife of Ram Shah, she reappeared during his son Dambar Shah's reign, and according to other sources indicate that she appeared during the reign of Prithvi Narayan Shah, founder of present-day Nepal. The temple is the holy site of Goddess Bhagawati devi, an incarnation of Lakshmi with Garud as protector. Mana translates as "heart" and "kamana" as "wish" and it is believed that the Bhagwati grants wishes of its devotees.

== History ==
In 1764-65, Prithvi Narayan Shah began a trust to worship Manakamana, Bareyshwar Mahadev, and to feed the pigeons every day. Later, he made that vajracharya priests to worship the temple and donated a bronze bell, however, another source says that Girvan Yuddha Bikram Shah had donated it. According to another engraving, in 1802-3, four siblings: Sur Bir, Kar Bir, Fauda Singh, and Khagda Singh built the gold plated - main gate. In 1893-4, the bell was repaired by Kulman Thapa, and during the reign of Surendra Bikram Shah, the top roof was built with corrugated copper sheets. King Mahendra replaced the roof and added copper roofing and later roof truss were engraved to feature images of Asta Matrikas: Brahamayani. Vaisanavi, Maheswari, Indrayani, and Kumari.

Manakamana Temple started to lean six inches towards south-west after the 1934 Nepal–India earthquake and 1988 Nepal earthquake. The April 2015 Nepal earthquake made cracks on the roof and titled the temple 9-12 inches in the direction of north-east. In June 2015, reconstruction began under the supervision of Department of Archaeology with the budget of 130-140 million Nepalese rupees (NPR), and it was finished in September 2018. Limestone, surkhi, bricks and wood were used in the restoration process, and the roof, the door, the finial, and windows were gold-plated with 14 kilograms of gold which costed about 90 million NPR.

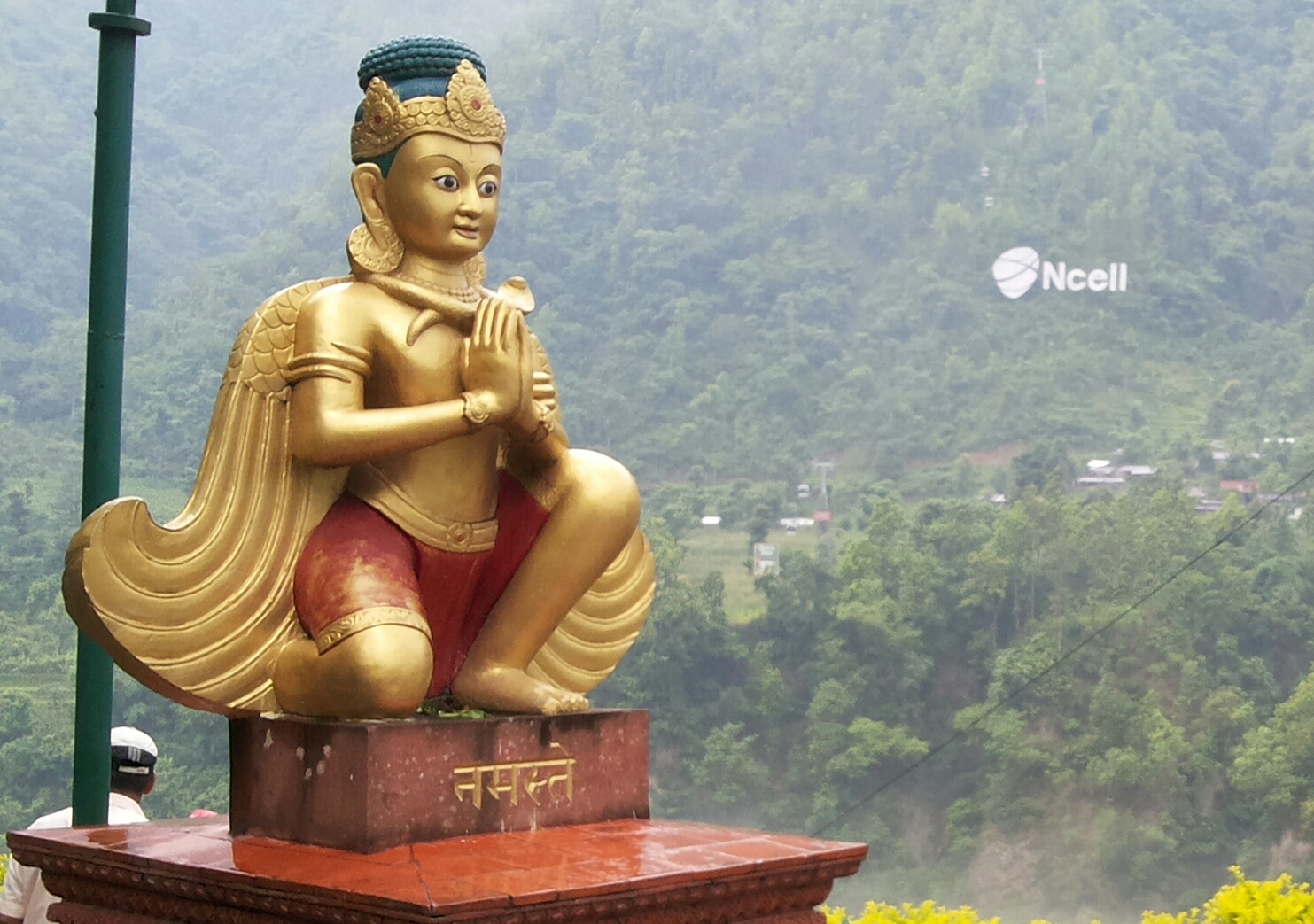

== Cable car ==
In earlier times, the only way to reach the Manakamana temple was by a long strenuous trek for about three hours. Now, there is a facility of a cable car from Kurintar, just 5 kilometres (3.1 mi) east of Mugling to Manakamana. The cable car rides over the distance of 2.8 kilometres (1.7 mi) in 10 minutes more or less. The cable car usually operates during the daytime from 9 am to 5 pm and stops during lunch break from noon to half past one. His Royal Highness Crown Prince Dipendra Bir Bikram Shah Dev inaugurated Manakamana cable car on 24 November 1998. The cable car system was imported from Austria and guarantees a hundred percent safety. It has features such as automatically operated generators in case of power failure and hydraulic emergency drive. The employees working at the cable car service are qualified and well trained for emergencies.

The bottom station of the cable car is placed at Kurintar (258 metres (846 ft)) and the top station is at Manakamana (1,302 metres (4,272 ft)). With 31 passenger cars and three cargo cars, the cable car can handle up to 600 persons per hour, and each car carry six passengers each.

== In popular culture ==
- The 2013 documentary film Manakamana documents various groups of individuals riding the cable car.
