= Balagan Limited =

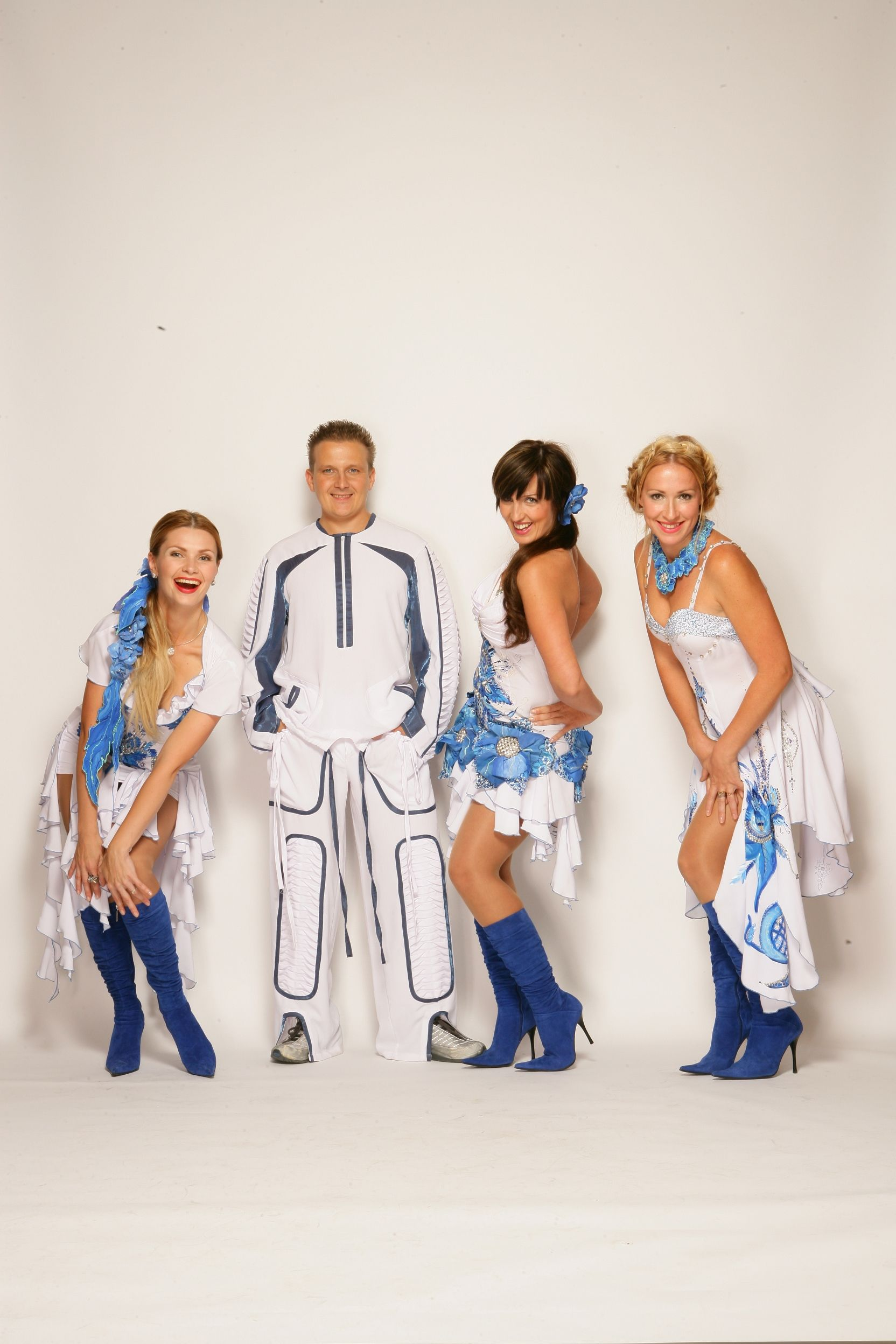

Background information
- Origin: Russia
- Genres: Contemporary folk music Pop music Romance
- Years active: 1999–present
- Website: balaganlimited.ru

Balagan Limited (Russian: Балаган Лимитед) is a Russian music group that came into being in May 1996 in the city of Rybinsk. On 1 June 1999 'Balagan Limited' already appears in the new composition: Svetlana Smirnova, Elena Selihova, Alyona Morugina and Dmitry Filin. There is also a fifth member in 'Balagan Limited' group, Ulyan Koval, who in 1999 had a car accident and still can not go on stage.

Group participated in the Slavianski Bazaar in Vitebsk, Pesnya goda, ZD Awards.

'Balagan Limited' has songs in its repertoire in English, Ukrainian, Georgian, Latvian, Bulgarian and Hebrew. The group has representatives in Ukraine, Israel and Latvia.

== Awards ==
- Chanson of the Year (2002)
- Nasha Pisnya (Ukraine)
- Favorite of Olympus 2004 (Ukraine) for the promotion of Ukrainian culture in Russia
