= Golden Brown =

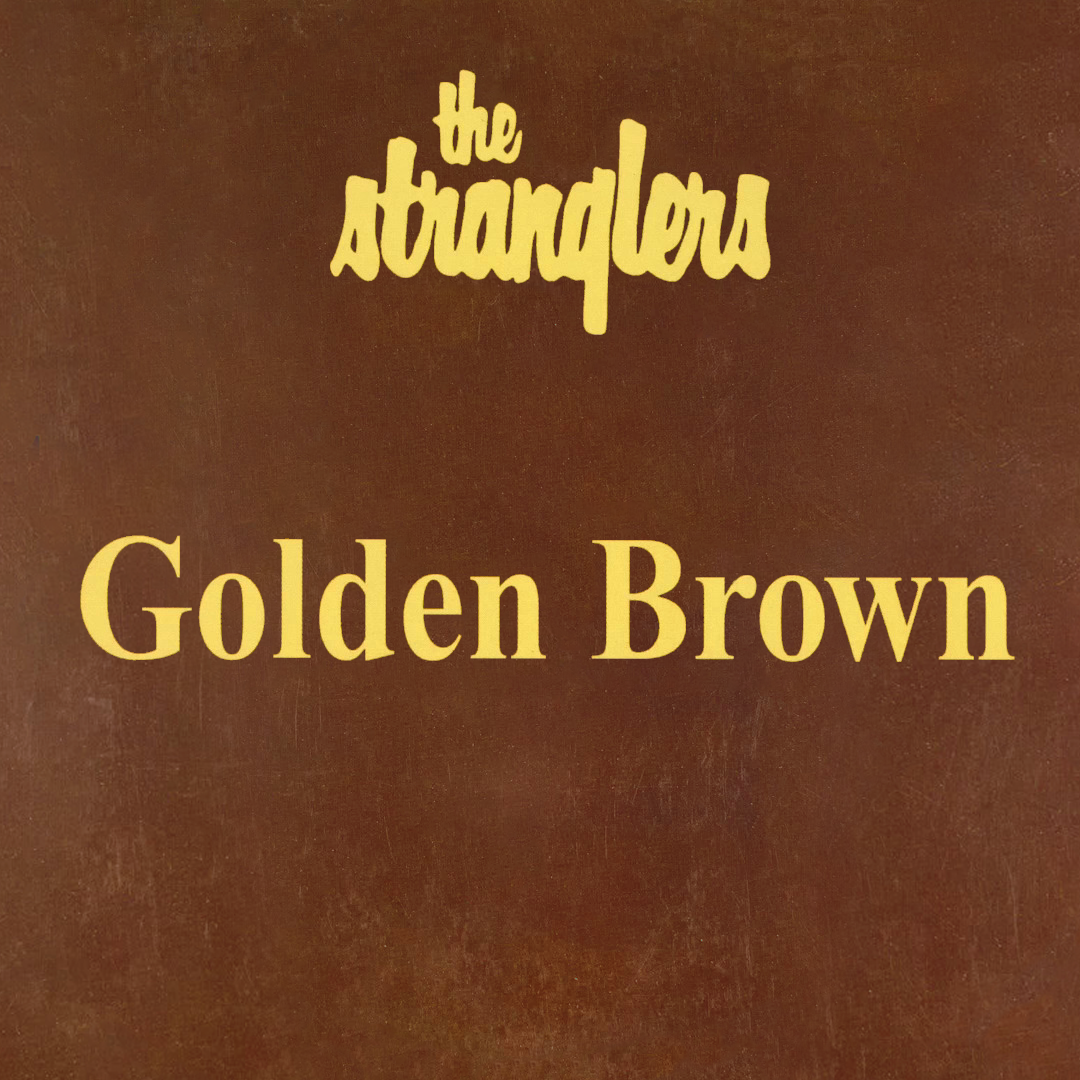

Single by the Stranglers

from the album La folie
- B-side: "Love 30"
- Released: 11 January 1982 (UK)
- Studio: The Manor Studio (Shipton-on-Cherwell)
- Genre: New wave; baroque pop; psychedelic pop
- Length: 3:30
- Label: Liberty
- Songwriters: Hugh Cornwell; Jean-Jacques Burnel; Dave Greenfield; Jet Black
- Producers: The Stranglers; Steve Churchyard

The Stranglers singles chronology
"Let Me Introduce You to the Family" (1981)	"Golden Brown" (1982)	"La Folie" (1982)

The Stranglers singles chronology
"Always the Sun (Sunny Side Up Mix)" (1991)	"Golden Brown" (1991)	"Heaven or Hell" (1992)

Music video
- "Golden Brown" on YouTube

"Golden Brown" is a song by the English rock band the Stranglers, released as a 7-inch single on EMI's Liberty label in 1982. Noted for its distinctive harpsichord instrumentation, it was the second single released from the band's sixth studio album La Folie (1981). The single peaked at No. 2 on the UK Singles Chart, making it the band's highest-charting single in the country.

== Composition ==
The main body of the song has a triple metre waltz rhythm, with beats grouped in threes, but the instrumental parts add an extra beat to create a phrase of thirteen beats. The thirteen beats appear in the sheet music as alternating bars of 6/8 and 7/8, which has also been described as three bars of 3/4 followed by one bar of 4/4. Sheet music of "Golden Brown" on musicnotes.com is published in B-flat minor.

The music was largely written by keyboardist Dave Greenfield and drummer Jet Black, with lyrics by singer/guitarist Hugh Cornwell. The music was adapted from an unused part of "Second Coming", a track which featured on their previous album, The Gospel According to the Meninblack.

According to bassist Jean-Jacques Burnel, the song was about the pleasures of heroin and romance. Its success "really represented us sticking our fingers up to our detractors".

=== Lyrics ===
In his 2001 book The Stranglers Song by Song, Cornwell states: "'Golden Brown' works on two levels. It's about heroin and also about a girl... both provided me with pleasurable times."

== Release and reception ==
Initially, the band's label was hesitant to release the song as a single. Burnel recalled, "We had to insist on it being released. We'd been taken over by EMI and they thought we were awful – and they hated 'Golden Brown'. They said: this song, you can't dance to it, you're finished". The label ultimately released the song during the Christmas season, leaving it to compete with Christmas songs. Burnel stated, "They thought, it's weak, it's gonna die, it's gonna drown in the tsunami of Christmas shit… but it didn't. It developed legs of its own, it became a worldwide hit".

Originally featured on the group's album La folie, which was released in November 1981, and later on the US pressings of Feline (1983), "Golden Brown" was released as a single in January 1982, and was accompanied by a music video. The single reached No. 2 in the official UK Singles Chart in February 1982. David Hamilton, disc jockey on the middle-of-the-road and comparatively conservative BBC Radio 2, made the single his "record of the week". In a 2017 interview for Dutch television program Top 2000 à Go-Go, Hugh Cornwell said that he believed the song would have made it to the top spot if bassist Burnel had not told the press that it was about heroin, at which point broadcasters removed it from their playlists. "I would have waited till it got to Number 1 and then said it," he commented. EMI instead blamed the single's failure to reach the top spot on sales of both the studio and live single releases of the Jam's "Town Called Malice", the number one single at the time, being counted together. The song also reached the Top 10 in Ireland, Flanders, the Netherlands, and Australia.

In 1995, Black, Burnel and Greenfield appeared with impressionist Rory Bremner on his satirical Christmas special performing a parody version of the song about future Prime Minister Gordon Brown, who was then Shadow Chancellor of the Exchequer.

In a 2012 BBC Radio 2 listener poll of the nation's favourite singles to have peaked at number two, "Golden Brown" ranked fifth.

In January 2014, NME ranked the song at No. 488 on its list of "The 500 Greatest Songs of All Time".

== Music video ==
Two shots from the music clip of "Golden Brown": the band performing the song in Leighton House and as explorers

The video for "Golden Brown" was directed by Lindsey Clennell. It depicts the band members as explorers in Egypt in the 1920s and performers for a fictional "Radio Cairo".

The video is intercut with stock footage of the Giza pyramid complex, the Mir-i-Arab Madrasah in Bukhara, the Shah Mosque in Isfahan, the Great Sphinx, sailing feluccas, Bedouins riding camels, and camel racing in the United Arab Emirates. The performance scenes were filmed in the Leighton House Museum in Holland Park, London, which was also featured in the video for "Gold" by Spandau Ballet in 1983.

== Track listing ==
Songs, lyrics and music by the Stranglers.

=== 7-inch: Liberty / BP 407 (UK) ===
Side A
No.	Title	Length
1.	"Golden Brown"	3:28

Side B
No.	Title	Length
1.	"Love 30"	3:57

=== 1991 7-inch: Epic / 656761 7 (UK) ===
Side A
No.	Title	Length
1.	"Golden Brown"	3:29

Side B
No.	Title	Length
1.	"You"	3:09

=== 1991 Reissue – CD-Maxi: Epic / 656761 2 (UK) ===
No.	Title	Length
1.	"Golden Brown"	3:31
2.	"You"	3:08
3.	"Peaches"	3:59
4.	"Skin Deep (12-inch Version)"	7:09
Total length:		17:47

== Charts ==
=== Weekly charts ===
Chart (1982)	Peak position
Australia (Kent Music Report)	10
Belgium (Ultratop 50 Flanders)	7
France (IFOP)	73
Germany (GfK)	63
Ireland (IRMA)	3
Netherlands (Dutch Top 40)	8
Netherlands (Single Top 100)	10
UK Singles (Official Charts)	2

Chart (1991)^{1}	Peak position
Ireland (IRMA)	25
UK Singles (Official Charts)	68

Chart (2025–2026)	Peak position
Global Excl. US (Billboard)	140
India International (IMI)	8
Sweden Heatseeker (Sverigetopplistan)	5
Switzerland (Schweizer Hitparade)	60

Remix

Chart (2013)	Peak position
UK Singles (Official Charts)	98

=== Year-end charts ===
Year-end chart performance for "Golden Brown"
Chart (1982)	Position
Australia (Kent Music Report)	95

== Certifications ==
Region	Certification	Certified units/sales
Spain (Promusicae)	Gold	50,000^{‡}
United Kingdom (BPI)	2× Platinum	1,200,000^{‡}
^{‡} Sales+streaming figures based on certification alone.

== Cover versions and samples ==
In 1996, British hip hop group Kaleef's re-working of the song reached number 22 on the UK Singles Chart.

In 1997, a cover version by soul singer Omar reached number 37 in the UK.

In 2007, British singer Jamelia released the single "No More", which heavily samples "Golden Brown".

In 2012, Cornwell sang a mariachi version of the song, backed by the Mexican-British band Mariachi Mexteca (later known as the Mariachis).

In 2016, British actor and personality Alexander Armstrong released a cover on his album Upon a Different Shore.

In 2020, British YouTuber and saxophonist Laurence Mason's cover of "Golden Brown" in the style of Dave Brubeck's "Take Five" was viewed over a million times, leading to a commercial release via Amazon and iTunes and as a vinyl single under the title Take Vibe EP. The vinyl release stayed two weeks in the top 40 of the Official Vinyl Singles Chart, peaking at No. 24.
