= Leviathan (2012 film) =

2012 documentary film by Lucien Castaing-Taylor and Véréna Paravel

- Theatrical release poster
- Directed by: Lucien Castaing-Taylor; Véréna Paravel
- Written by: Lucien Castaing-Taylor; Verena Paravel
- Starring: Declan Conneely; Johnny Gatcombe; Adrian Guillette
- Production companies: Arrête ton Cinéma; Sensory Ethnography Lab
- Distributed by: Cinema Guild
- Release date: August 9, 2012 (Locarno Film Festival)
- Running time: 87 minutes
- Country: United States
- Language: English
- Box office: $76,211

Leviathan is a 2012 American documentary directed by Lucien Castaing-Taylor and Véréna Paravel of the Sensory Ethnography Lab at Harvard University. It is a work about the North American fishing industry. The film was acquired for U.S. distribution by The Cinema Guild. The film-makers used GoPro cameras and worked twenty-hour shifts during the shooting of the film.

== Reception ==
Rotten Tomatoes reports 84% approval for Leviathan based on 51 critics, and the film also holds an 81/100 average on Metacritic. Peter Howell of the Toronto Star said the film "plunges us into the sights and sounds of this visceral business", using "[t]iny waterproof cameras that could be clipped or rested upon people, fish or objects…to capture the film’s raw images and natural sounds. Edited together into a non-linear and virtually wordless whole, it creates a briny immersive effect that is almost hallucinatory." Dennis Lim of The New York Times noted that the film "conveys the brutal toll that the enterprise takes on the workers and on the ocean, and it could even be read as an environmental parable in which the sea threatens to exact its revenge on humanity. But none of this is explicit in the film, which avoids exposition and context, unfolds almost entirely in the dark and often verges on hallucinatory abstraction. Where most documentaries prize clarity, this one attests to the power of estrangement." Melissa Anderson of The Village Voice opined that "[t]he density of aural and visual stimuli overwhelms—and liberates." N.P.R. critic Stephanie Zacharek was less complimentary, calling the film "a self-conscious tone poem concocted from oblique camera angles, shots held longer than it takes a tadpole to reach maturity and nighttime images enhanced with a psychedelic glow. An alternate title for it might be David Lynch, Gone Fishin'."

The film won the Michael Powell award for best British feature at the Edinburgh International Film Festival as well as the Experimental/Independent Film/Video Award at the 2012 Los Angeles Film Critics Association Awards. It was presented within Maryland Film Festival 2013 as a favorite film of Baltimore-based filmmaker Matthew Porterfield.

In July 2025, it ranked number 66 on Rolling Stone's list of "The 100 Best Movies of the 21st Century."

== Accolades ==
Michael Powell Award for Best British Film, Edinburgh International Film Festival

Locarno International Film Festival - Fipresci Jury Award

Locarno International Film Festival - Ficc/Iffs Don Quixote Prize Special Mention

Vienna International Film Festival - Standard Audience Award

Cph:dox - New:Vision Award

Sevilla International Film Festival - Non-Fiction Eurodoc Award

Ridm - Best Cinematography and Best Sound in an International Feature

Belfort International Film Festival - Grand Jury Award

Belfort International Film Festival - One + One Award

Belfort International Film Festival - Documentaire Sur Grand Écran Award

Torino Film Festival - Internazionale.doc Best Film Special PrizeI

Los Angeles Film Critics Circle - Douglas Edwards Independent/Experimental Award

Independent Spirit Awards - Stella Artois Truer than Fiction Award Nomination

Milan International Film Festival - La Giuria Giovani

Milan International Film Festival - Giuria Audiodoc

Silver Puma for Best Film in Ficuman

True Vision Award True/False Film Festival

== Pre-Production ==
Castaing-Taylor has had a connection with the fishing industry due to his father working in the shipping industry. Leviathan was initially planned to be mainly about the fishing industry on the land portion of the process, however it was changed to the sea only due to the change in interest by the film-makers. The direction of the film was to highlight the contrast between the past and present of New Bedford. The production on land took place at local factories and net/ice production dredges. Shooting took place 200 miles off the coast of New Bedford, Massachusetts. The area of New Bedford has a history of being the whaling capital of the past, and is presently the largest fishing port in the United States. Moby Dick also took place here. Over the course of filming Leviathan, Castaing-Taylor got sea-sick and Paravel went to the emergency room twice upon returning to land. Trips on the boat took place over six intervals of two-week periods. Leviathan was shot in two months aboard the boat, consisting of six trips in total.

=== Use of GoPros ===
While filming, the director's first camera was lost at sea and they had to resort to their auxiliary cameras, GoPros. The images produced by the GoPros created after-images of haunting qualities due to the lack of clarity within the lens. According to Castaing-Taylor, “It activated the viewer’s imagination much more.”

== Academic ==
Castaing-Taylor created Leviathan within Harvard's Sensory Ethnography Lab with his associates and students. The Sensory Ethnography Lab (S.E.L.) is a Harvard-based laboratory that focuses on reinventing ethnographic film and documentary. Castaing-Taylor began the lab in 2006 to combine the departments of anthropology and visual and environmental studies at Harvard. He has this to say about the program: “It takes ethnography seriously. It’s not as though you can do ethnography with a two-day, fly-by-night visit somewhere. But it also takes ‘sensory’ seriously. Most anthropological writing and most ethnographic film, with the exception of some truly great works, is so devoid of emotional or sensory experience.” Above all, he added: “It takes what art can do seriously. It tries to yoke it to the real in some way.”

== See also ==
- New Bedford, Massachusetts
