= Balagan Film Series =

The Balagan Film Series, also known as Video Balagan is a nonprofit organization has that organized screenings of underground and experimental films in Boston, Massachusetts since 2000. Screenings usually take place at the Brattle Theater in Cambridge, Massachusetts and the Coolidge Corner Theater in Brookline, Massachusetts. They are one of the longest running microcinemas dedicated to experimental, niche programming in the New England, North Eastern US region.

== History ==
The Balagan Film Series was founded by two filmmakers, Jeff Daniel Silva and Alla Kovgan in 2000. The idea came out of the filmmakers' difficulties in finding screening venues for their own experimental works. Inspired by Amos Vogel's famed Cinema 16 Film Society and the film programming work of Jonas Mekas in New York City, Silva and Kovgan began setting up their own microcinema events of alternative film in Boston. New England's "strong and extremely diverse community of experimental filmmakers" needed a screening venue.
