= Ramona Badescu (author) =

French author of children's literature

- Ramona Bădescu
- Occupation: Author
- Notable work: Pomelo the Garden Elephant
- Style: Children's literature
- Website: Ramona-badescu.com

Ramona Badescu (sometimes written Ramona Bădescu) is a Romanian author of children's literature, mainly known for her children book series Pomelo the Garden Elephant.

== Biography ==
Born in Romania, Badescu immigrated to France at the age of 10.

== Work ==
Badescu has published 25 books in French since 2002, some of which were translated into English, Chinese, Japanese, Spanish, Swedish, Italian, German, Korean, Norwegian, and Greek. Her most popular children book series, Pomelo the Garden Elephant (illustrations by Benjamin Chaud), follows the adventures of a tiny garden elephant about the size of a dandelion. The series began in 2003 with Pomelo est bien sous son pissenlit ("Pomelo is well under his dandelion"). In Pomelo Begins to Grow (2011), the tiny elephant starts to grow up and wonders about his body changes.

== Bibliography ==
- Big Rabbit's Bad Mood (2009) Chronicle Books ISBN 978-0-81186-666-8
- Pomelo Begins to Grow (2011) Enchanted Lion Books ISBN 978-1-59270-111-7
- Pomelo Explores Color (2012) Enchanted Lion Books ISBN 978-1-59270-126-1
- Pomelo's Opposites (2013) Enchanted Lion Books ISBN 978-1-59270-132-2
- Pomelo's Big Adventure (2014) Enchanted Lion Books ISBN 978-1-59270-158-2
- Badescu, Ramona (2024). Viens! (Les Grandes personnes) (in French). ISBN 9782361937195.
