= Manakamana Multiple College =

Location
- Birtamode 7, Jhapa; Birtamode, Province No. 1 Nepal
- Coordinates: 26°38′N 87°59′E

Information
- Type: Private
- Motto: Education for culture and dignity
- Founded: 2055 BS
- Website: http://manakamana.edu.np

Manakamana College is situated in Birtamode, Jhapa near the transportation office. The college's motto is Education for culture and dignity.

== Course offered ==
1. Bachelor in Business Studies (BBS)
2. Bachelor in Education (B.Ed)
3. Bachelor in Arts (BA)
4. Bachelor in Computer Education (BCA)

== Affiliation ==
This college is affiliated with Tribhuvan University (TU)
