= De Humani Corporis Fabrica (film) =

2022 French-Swiss film

- Directed by: Lucien Castaing-Taylor; Véréna Paravel
- Written by: Lucien Castaing-Taylor; Véréna Paravel
- Produced by: Pauline Gygax; Max Karli; Valentina Novati
- Cinematography: Lucien Castaing-Taylor; Véréna Paravel
- Edited by: Lucien Castaing-Taylor; Véréna Paravel
- Production companies: Norte Productions; Rita Productions; Sensory Ethnography Lab
- Release date: May 23, 2022 (Cannes)
- Running time: 115 minutes
- Countries: France; Switzerland; United States
- Language: French

De Humani Corporis Fabrica is a 2022 documentary film directed by Lucien Castaing-Taylor and Véréna Paravel, taking its title from the 16th-century anatomy books of Andreas Vesalius. It premiered at the 2022 Cannes Film Festival and was later shown at festivals including Toronto, New York and Taipei.

== Synopsis ==
The film examines French hospitals through footage of operations and micro-camera images from inside the body, including views of blood vessels and organs.

== Production ==
The film takes its title from the 16th-century anatomy books of the Dutch physician Andreas Vesalius. It was made using footage from invasive medical cameras inside patients’ bodies, filmed during around 400 operations in Paris hospitals. Images from the operation cameras were adapted for cinema projection.

== Reception ==
The Hollywood Reporter described the film as a “penetrating and profound documentary” and said its imagery was both “painful to watch” and “transfixingly beautiful”. Variety praised the film as “searingly and sometimes hilariously humane”, and wrote that it turned the inside of the body into “an exquisite alien landscape”. Filmdienst wrote that the film’s aesthetic approach created striking images that flirted with spectacle while also seeking to elicit emotional responses.

== Festival screenings ==
The film premiered in the Directors' Fortnight program at the 2022 Cannes Film Festival. It was later shown in the Wavelengths program at the 2022 Toronto International Film Festival, and in the main slate of the 2022 New York Film Festival. In 2023, it was also screened at festivals including the Solothurn Film Festival, Docaviv, and the Taipei Film Festival.
