= Manakamana Cable Car =

Aerial lift in Nepal

Manakamana Cable Car मनकामना केबल कार
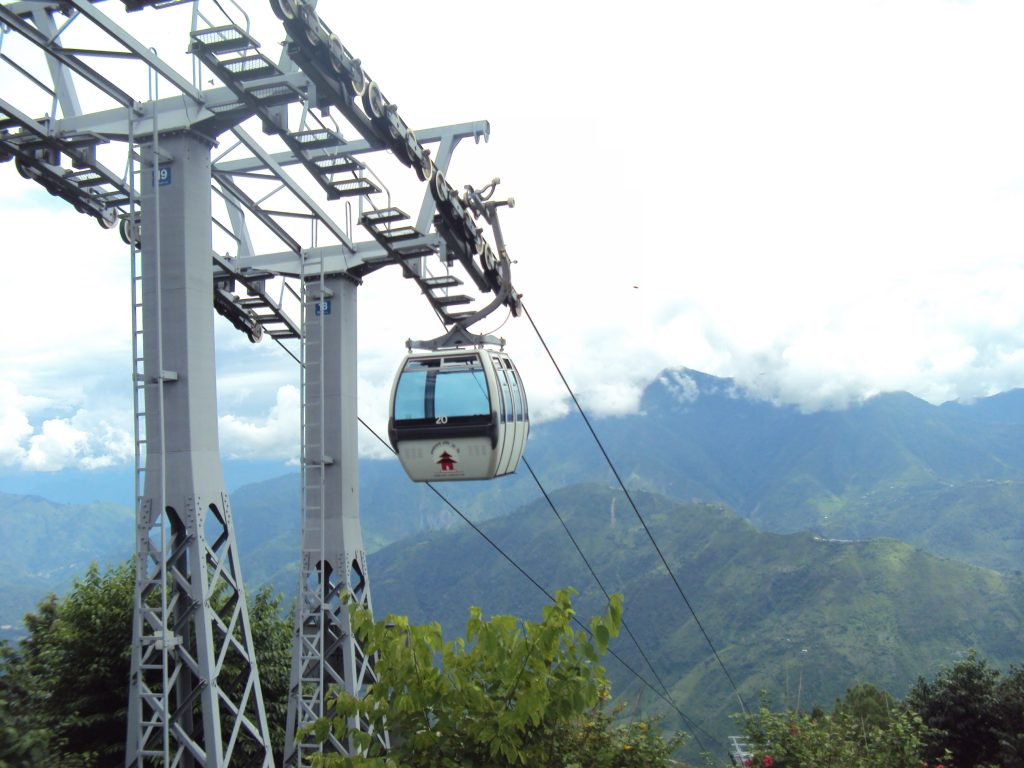
- Manakamana Cable Car

Overview
- Status: Operational
- Character: Elevated
- Location: Kurintar, Gorkha, Nepal
- Termini: Cheres, Chitwan; Manakamana, Gorkha
- No. of stations: 2
- Open: 24 November 1998
- Website: Official website

Operation
- Operator: Manakamana Darshan Pvt. Ltd.

Technical features
- Aerial lift type: Cable car
- Line length: 2,772.2 m (9,095 ft)
- Operating speed: 21.6 km/h (13.4 mph)
- Notes: 1,302 m (4,272 ft); Electric motor powering cable bullwheel

The Manakamana Cable Car (Nepali: मनकामना केबल कार) is a gondola lift transportation system located in Chitwan, Nepal. The 2,772.2 m (9,095 ft) line has two stations, connecting Kurintar, Chitwan to Manakamana temple, Gorkha. It provides an aerial link from the base station located inside the cable car station to the peak of the Kafakdada hill, where the Manakamana Temple is located at 1300 metres above sea level and from which the cable car receives its name.

The operation of Nepal's first commercial Cable Car service commenced on 24 November 1998 and was inaugurated by the Late Crown Prince Dipendra Bir Bikram Shah. The cable car system is designed by the Doppelmayr Group of Austria, an ISO 9001:2015 certified company and the leading international manufacturer in the aerial ropeway industry.

== History ==
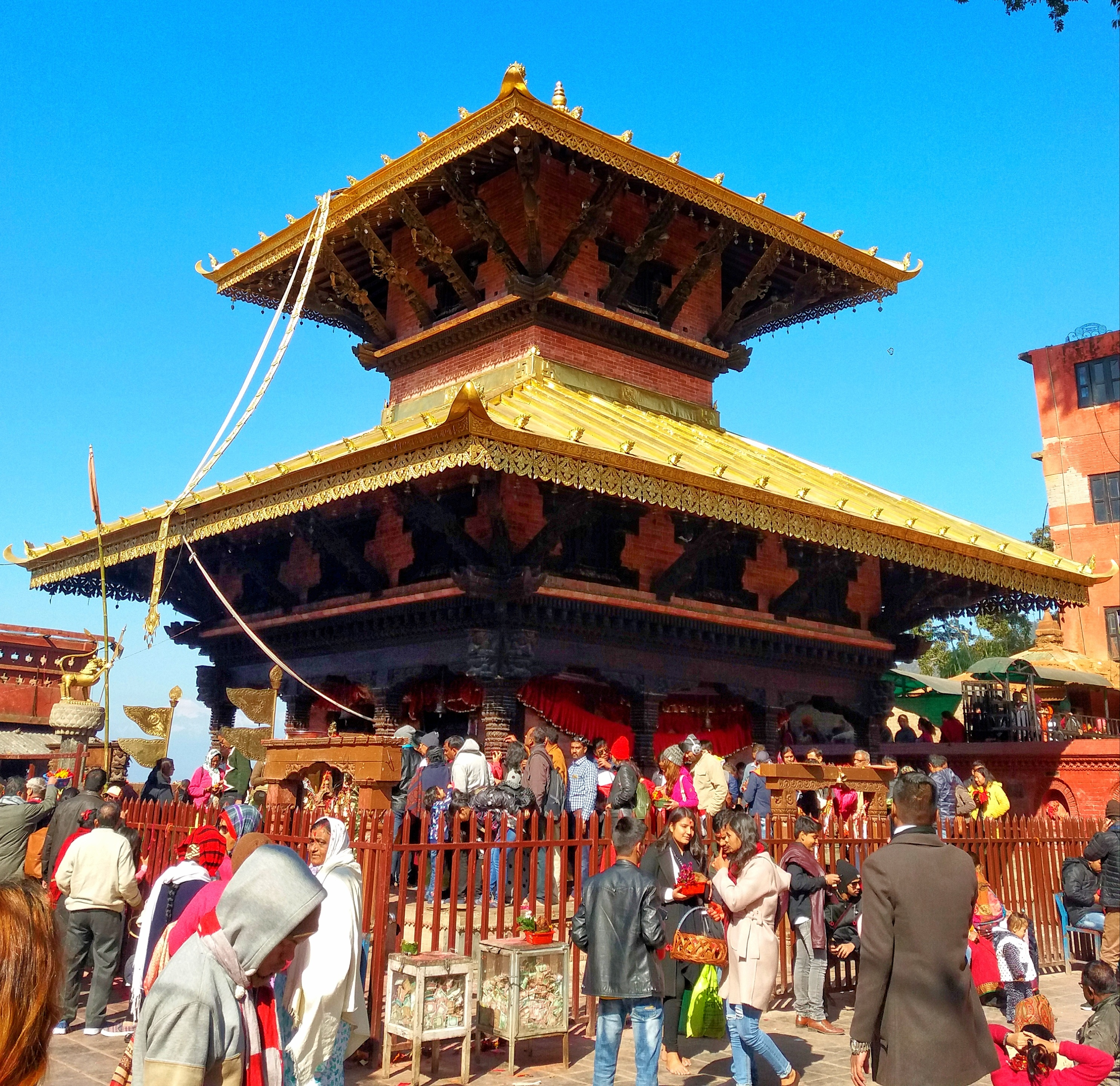
Manakamana temple

The Manakamana Devi temple, situated in the Gorkha district of Nepal, is regarded as a wish-fulfilling temple and is worshipped by most of the Hindu population around the world. In the Nepali Language, "Mana" meaning heart and "Kamana" meaning wishes hence, making Manakamana the ‘goddess of hearts wishes’.

The legend of the Manakamana goddess dates back to the 16th-century King Ram Shah of Gorkha, who mysteriously died after witnessing his queen’s divine power as an incarnation of the Hindu goddess Durga. Shortly after his death, the queen had to practice the historical and sacrificial custom of ‘sati ’. Lakhan Thapa Magar, a devotee of the queen, grieved and pleaded with the queen before her death and she promised him that she would reappear soon. Years later when a farmer was ploughing his field, he struck a boulder and to his surprise witnessed the appearance of blood and milk coming from it. Hearing about this phenomenon, Lakhan Thapa was convinced that it was a symbol of the late queen’s return and that his wish had come true. The discovery site became the present-day shrine where he chose to devote the rest of his life to serving the goddess Manakamana thus, starting a tradition of patrilineal descent of Thapa-Magar priesthood that continues in their 21st generation of devotion.

== Stations ==
The aerial line has two stations:

- Base Station (Cheres, Chitwan): Height 258 m (846 ft)
- Top Station (Manakamana, Gorkha): Height 1,302 m (4,272 ft)

There are currently 34 gondolas with 6 passenger seating capacity each and 3 freight carriers in operation. The cable car ride covers a distance of 2.8 kilometres (1.7 mi) in 10 minutes. The cable car system was imported from Austria and guarantees a hundred percent safety, featuring automatically operated generators in case of power failure and hydraulic emergency drive.

=== Technical Features ===
- Horizontal distance: 2774.20 m
- Vertical rise: 1033.60 m
- Inclined distance: 3023.75 m
- Haul rope diameter: 41mm
- Bull wheel diameter: Top 4.8 m, Bottom 4.4 m
- Design speed: 0.3–6 m/s
- Operating speed: 3.5–6 m/s
- Turn around trip time: 8.24 minute
- Hourly capacity: 660 passengers/hour
- Number of stations: 2
- Number of in-line towers: 20
- Height of tallest tower: 41 m
- Longest free span: 516 m (between Tower 5 and Tower 6 )
- Steepest gradient: 37 degrees

== Operating Hours and Maintenance Schedule ==
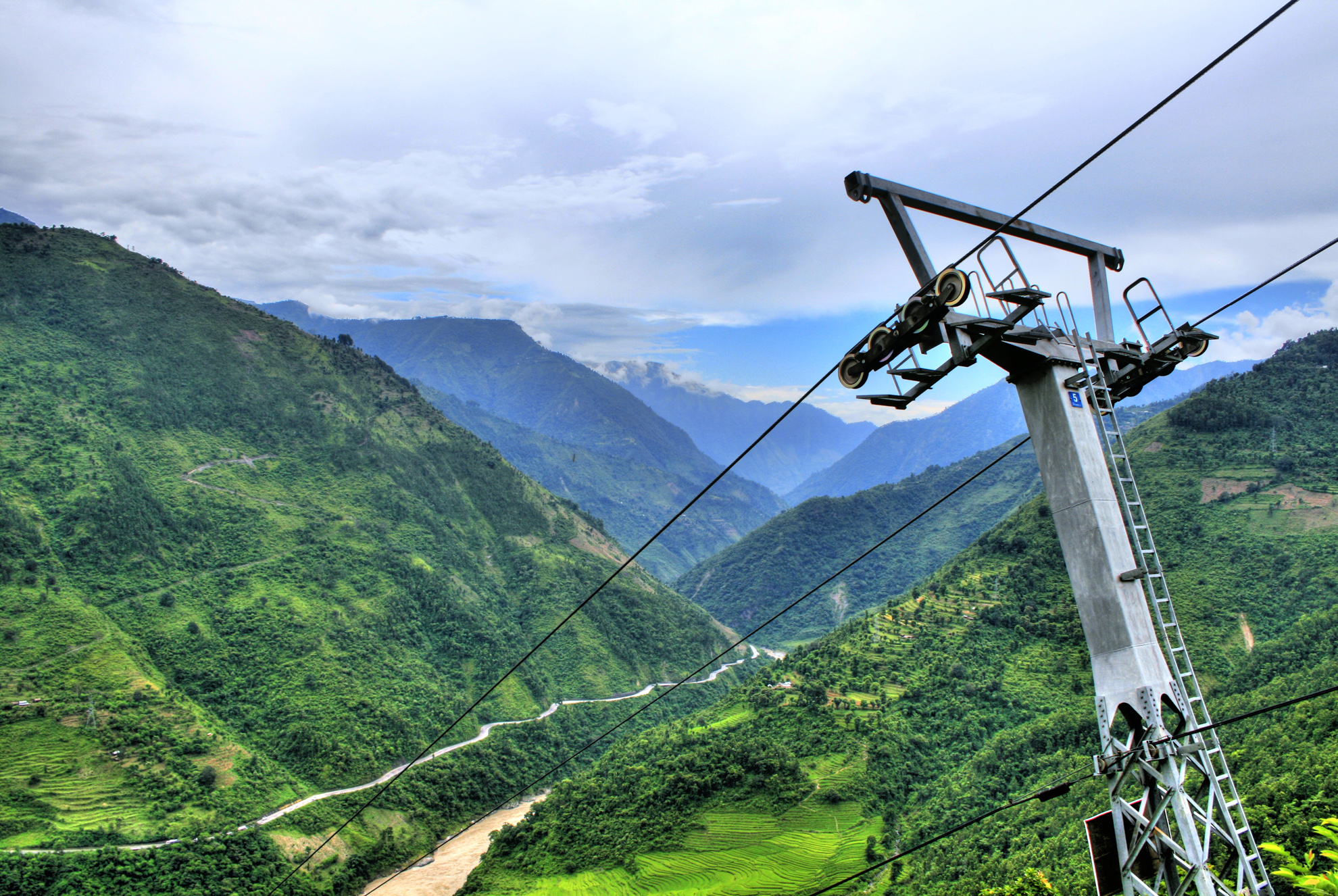
A tower of the cable car system

The cable car typically operates daily from 9:00 a.m. to 5:00 p.m., with a lunch break from noon to 1:30 p.m.

The cable car undergoes routine maintenance before and after normal operating hours each day. In accordance with Doppelmayr maintenance protocols, the cable car undergoes maintenance for 2–3 days every four months.

== Ticket Rates ==
Rates Apply from 17 July 2023
CATEGORIES	TWO-WAY	ONE-WAY
NEPALI (GENERAL)	रु 770.00	रु 450.00
NEPALI (CHILD)	रु 460.00	रु 270.00
NEPALI (STUDENT)	रु 575.00	रु 335.00
NEPALI (SENIOR CITIZEN)	रु 540.00	रु 315.00
NEPALI (DISABLE)	रु 385.00	रु 255.00
INDIAN	INR 670.00	INR 400.00
INDIAN (CHILD)	INR 400.00	INR 240
SAARC/CHINESE	$10.00	$6.00
SAARC/ CHINESE CHILD	$7.00	$4.00
FOREIGNER	$20.00	$11.00
FOREIGNER (CHILD)	$15.00	$8.00
GOAT	-	रु 275.00
GOODS	-	रु 17.00

== Documentary and film ==
It is featured in the 2013 documentary film Manakamana, which is entirely shot inside the cabins.

== See also ==
- Chandragiri Cable Car
- List of gondola lifts
