= Ilisa Barbash =

American visual anthropologist and filmmaker

Ilisa Barbash is an American visual anthropologist, documentary filmmaker, and author. She is the Curator of Visual Anthropology at Harvard University’s Peabody Museum of Archaeology and Ethnology.

== Career ==
Barbash’s work focuses on ethnographic filmmaking and visual anthropology. She co‑directed Sweetgrass (2009), which premiered at the Berlin International Film Festival and received critical acclaim. Her earlier film, In and Out of Africa (1992), explores the African art market and questions of authenticity and cultural ownership.

In print scholarship, Barbash is the author of Where the Roads All End: Photography and Anthropology in the Kalahari (2016), which won the John Collier Jr. Award for Still Photography from the Society for Visual Anthropology. She is also a co‑editor of To Make Their Own Way in the World: The Enduring Legacy of the Zealy Daguerreotypes (2020).

Barbash has taught courses in ethnographic film production and theory at institutions such as San Francisco State University, the University of California, Berkeley, and the University of Colorado Boulder.

== Filmography ==
- In and Out of Africa (1992) – co‑director, producer
- Sweetgrass (2009) – co‑director, producer

== Selected bibliography ==
- Where the Roads All End: Photography and Anthropology in the Kalahari (Peabody Museum Press, 2016). ISBN 0873654099 – author
- To Make Their Own Way in the World: The Enduring Legacy of the Zealy Daguerreotypes (Aperture, 2020). ISBN 1597114782 – co‑editor
- Cross-Cultural Filmmaking: A Handbook for Making Documentary and Ethnographic Films and Videos (University of California Press, 1997). ISBN 978-0-520-08760-6 -co-author
- The Cinema of Robert Gardner (Berg Publishers, 2007.). ISBN 978-1-84520-773-1 – co-editor
