= Sahid Lakhan Rural Municipality =

Gaunpalika in Gandaki, Nepal

Sahid Lakhan Rural Municipality सहिद लखन गाउँपालिका
- Gaunpalika
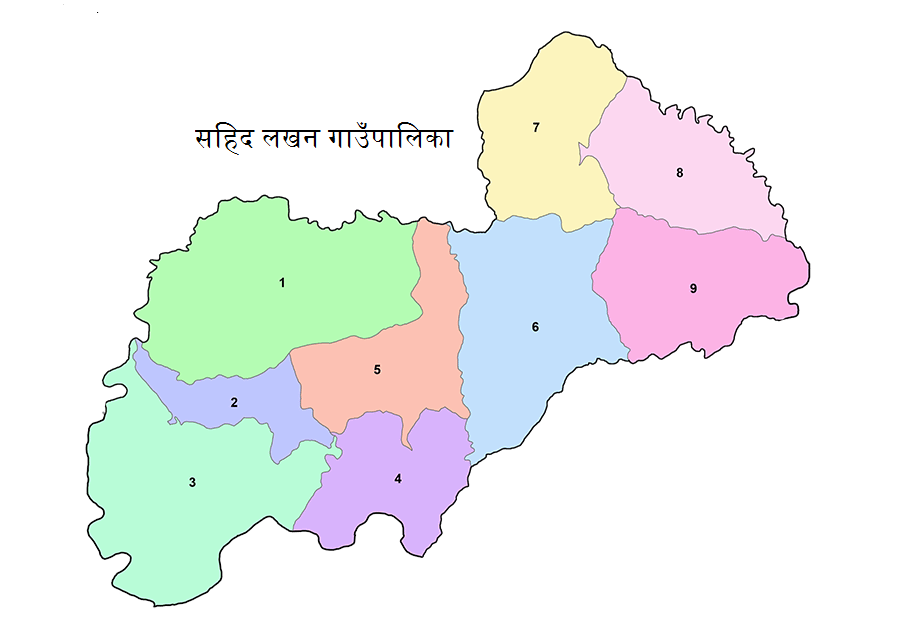
- Ward level map of Sahid Lakhan Rural Municipality

- Location in Nepal
- Coordinates: 27.927032°N 84.658404°E
- Country: Nepal
- Province: Gandaki
- District: Gorkha District

Area
  - Total: 149.03 km^{2} (57.54 sq mi)

Population
  - Total: 27,555
  - Density: 184.90/km^{2} (478.88/sq mi)
- Time zone: UTC+5:45 (Nepal Time)
- Website: http://shahidlakhanmun.gov.np/

Sahid Lakhan Rural Municipality (Nepali :सहिद लखन गाँउपालिका) is a Gaunpalika in Gorkha District in Gandaki Province of Nepal. On 12 March 2017, the government of Nepal implemented a new local administrative structure, with the implementation of the new local administrative structure, VDCs have been replaced with municipal and Village Councils. Sahid Lakhan is one of these 753 local units.

== Demographics ==
At the time of the 2011 Nepal census, Sahid Lakhan Rural Municipality had a population of 27,555. Of these, 71.6% spoke Nepali, 26.0% Magar, 1.3% Chepang, 0.3% Gurung, 0.2% Bhojpuri, 0.1% Maithili, 0.1% Newar, 0.1% Urdu and 0.1% other languages as their first language.

In terms of ethnicity/caste, 36.7% were Magar, 16.0% Newar, 13.1% Hill Brahmin, 9.3% Gurung, 6.8% Chhetri, 6.5% Sarki, 3.7% Kami, 3.4% Damai/Dholi, 1.5% Chepang/Praja, 0.5% Darai, 0.4% Badi, 0.4% Sanyasi/Dasnami, 0.3% Gharti/Bhujel, 0.3% Majhi, 0.2% Brahmu/Baramo, 0.2% Musalman, 0.1% Kumal, 0.1% Tamang, 0.1% other Terai and 0.3% others.

In terms of religion, 93.9% were Hindu, 4.9% Buddhist, 0.9% Christian, 0.2% Muslim and 0.1% Prakriti.

In terms of literacy, 69.2% could both read and write, 1.8% could read but not write and 28.9% could neither read nor write.
