= Véréna Paravel =

French anthropologist and artist (born 1971)

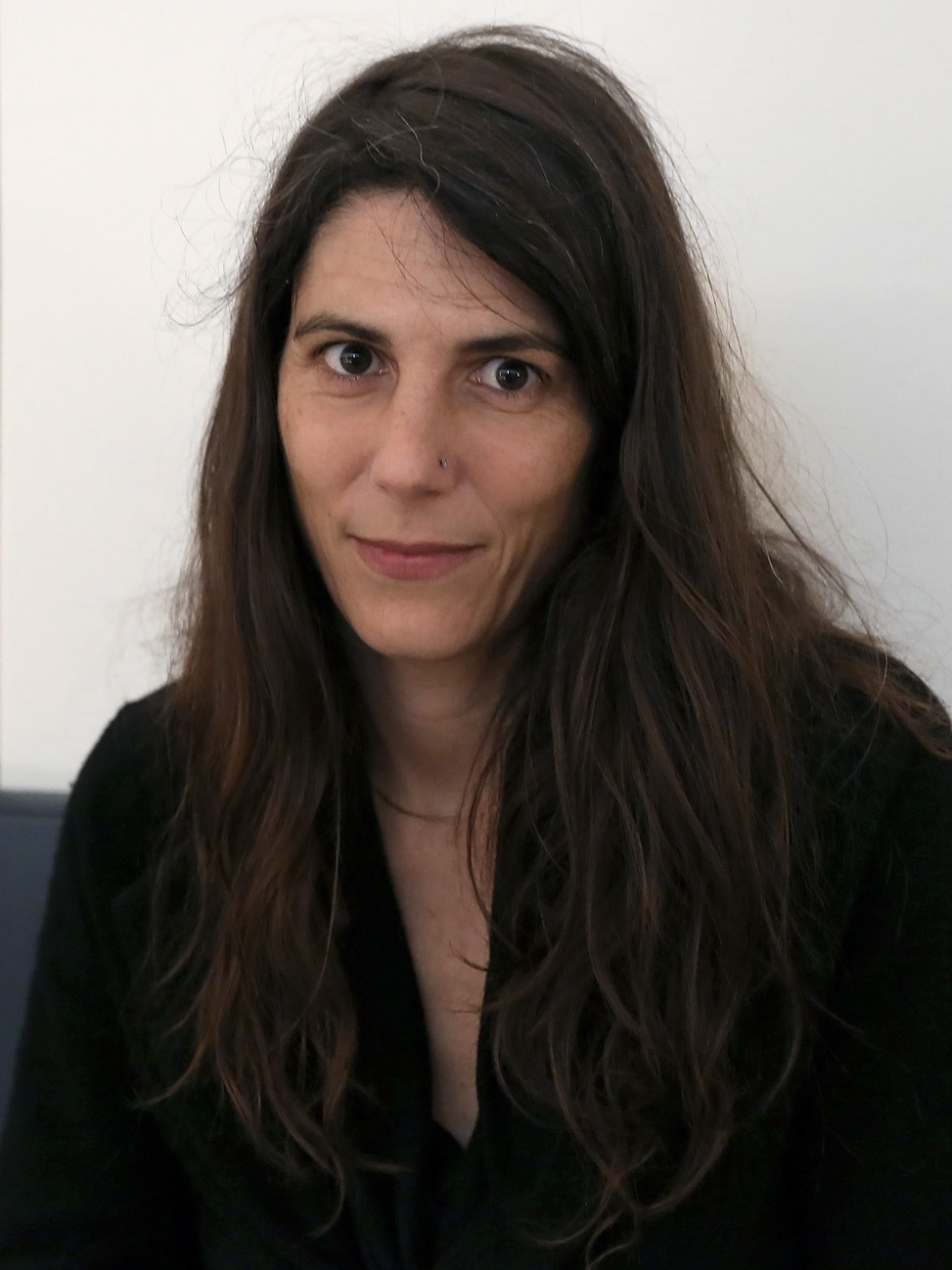
Paravel in 2013

Véréna Paravel (born 21 April 1971 in Neuchâtel, Switzerland) is a French anthropologist and artist who works in film, video, and photography.

== Biography ==
Verena Paravel was born in 1971. She is an anthropologist, artist and filmmaker who works in the Sensory Ethnography Lab at Harvard University in Cambridge, USA, and in Paris, France. Her work is in the permanent collection of New York's Museum of Modern Art, and has been exhibited at the Tate, the Whitney Biennial, MoMA, documenta 14 and elsewhere. Her award-winning films and videos have been exhibited at Berlin, Cannes, Locarno, New York, Toronto, Venice and various other film festivals.

Paravel collaborates with anthropologist and artist Lucien Castaing-Taylor in film, video, and installation. The film was shot on a trawler and it used only sounds and images taken on board. Their film Leviathan was released theatrically in the United States, United Kingdom, Mexico, Canada, France, Germany, Austria, and Japan, and won the FIPRESCI (International Film Critics) Award, a Creative Capital Award, and the Los Angeles Film Critics' Circle Douglas Edwards Independent and Experimental Film Award. Still Life/ Nature Morte and twelve of their other moving image works were included in the 2014 Whitney Museum Biennial.

In 2017, Paravel and Castaing-Taylor's film somniloquies, a feature-length film about dreams, desire, and the vulnerability of the human body, premiered at the Berlin International Film Festival. Also in 2017 Paravel and Castaing-Taylor's film Caniba (film), a feature-length film that reflects on the discomfiting significance of cannibalistic desire in human history and culture, premiered at the Venice International Film Festival where it was awarded the Special Orizzonti Jury Prize.

Earlier films by Paravel include 7 Queens (2008), a reflection on ephemeral encounters recorded during a walk beneath the elevated tracks of the No. 7 subway line in New York City, and Interface Series (2008-2010), a series of five videos filmed entirely through Skype.

== Filmography ==
=== Documentaries ===
Year	Title	Notes
2010	Foreign Parts	co-directed with J. P. Sniadecki
2012	Leviathan	co-directed with Lucien Castaing-Taylor
2017	Somniloquies	co-directed with Lucien Castaing-Taylor
2017	Caniba	co-directed with Lucien Castaing-Taylor
2022	De Humani Corporis Fabrica	co-directed with Lucien Castaing-Taylor
TBA	Cosmofonia	Pre-production

=== Short films ===
- With Such a Wistful Eye, Interface Series #1 (2008)
- 7 Queens (2008)
- I Only See Problems, Interface Series #2 (2009)
- Presented with Severe Pain, Interface Series #5 (2010)
- I Have No Friends, Interface Series #4 (2010)
- Habitat in 2009, Interface Series #3 (2010)
- He Maketh A Path To Shine After Him, One Would Think The Deep To Be Hoary (2013), co-directed with Lucien Castaing-Taylor
- Still Life (2013), co-directed with Lucien Castaing-Taylor
- The Last Judgment (2013), co-directed with Lucien Castaing-Taylor
- Spirits Still (2013), co-directed with Lucien Castaing-Taylor
- Ah, humanity! (2015), co-directed with Lucien Castaing-Taylor and Ernst Karel
- Commensal (2017), co-directed with Lucien Castaing-Taylor
