= Sweetgrass (film) =

2009 documentary film by Lucien Castaing-Taylor

- Official poster
- Directed by: Lucien Castaing-Taylor
- Produced by: Ilisa Barbash
- Cinematography: Lucien Castaing- Taylor
- Distributed by: Cinema Guild
- Release date: February 4, 2009 (Berlin)
- Running time: 101 minutes
- Country: United States
- Language: English

Sweetgrass is a 2009 documentary film that follows modern-day shepherds as they lead their flocks of sheep up into Montana's Absaroka-Beartooth mountains for summer pasture. It was directed by Lucien Castaing-Taylor, a Harvard anthropologist, and produced by his wife Ilisa Barbash. The title derives from Sweet Grass County, one of several in which the film was shot.

== Production and premiere ==
Recording first began in the spring of 2001, when Barbash and Castaing-Taylor first heard of a family of Norwegian‐American sheepherders in Montana. These herders were among the last to trail their band of sheep long distances through Montana's mountains. After eight years of filming and development, it premiered at the 59th Berlin International Film Festival. Since then it has regularly screened worldwide and distributed theatrically by Cinema Guild. In the United States, it premiered at the New York Film Festival, and in Montana at the Big Sky Documentary Film Festival in Missoula, where it received the Big Sky Artistic Excellence Award.

== Critical response ==
On review aggregator website Rotten Tomatoes, the film holds an approval rating of 97%. The website's critical consensus reads, "At once tender and unsentimental, Sweetgrass gracefully captures the beauty and hardships of a dying way of life." On Metacritic, the film has a weighted average score of 80 out of 100, based on 20 critics, indicating "generally favorable reviews".

Film critics have praised the film as "an anthropological work of art," focusing on its aesthetic minimalism, such as a lack of music and narration. The film is a New York Times Critic's Pick and a Washington Post Critic's Pick, and Manohla Dargis of The New York Times described it as "the first essential movie" of 2010.

== See also ==
- Visual anthropology
- Lists of films
