= Lucien Castaing-Taylor =

British anthropologist and artist

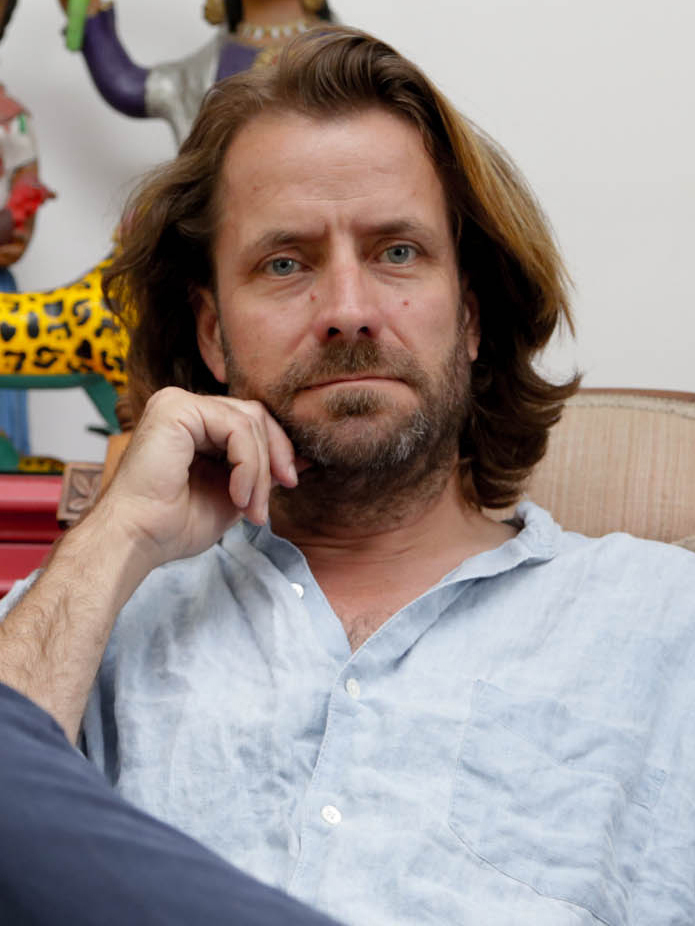
Lucien Castaing-Taylor in 2013.

Lucien Giles Castaing-Taylor (born 10 January 1966, Liverpool, United Kingdom) is a British anthropologist and artist who works in film, video, and photography.

== Biography ==
Castaing-Taylor received his B.A. at Cambridge University and his PhD at the University of California, Berkeley under Paul Rabinow. Since 2002 Castaing-Taylor has taught at Harvard University, where he is Director of the Sensory Ethnography Lab. His works include In and Out of Africa, which he made with Ilisa Barbash in 1992. It is an ethnographic video about issues of authenticity, taste, and racial politics in the African art market that won eight international awards. He also recorded the film Sweetgrass (2009), which is described as "an unsentimental elegy at once to the American West and to the 10,000 years of uneasy accommodation between post-Paleolithic humans and animals." He is the founding editor of the American Anthropological Association’s journal Visual Anthropology Review (1991–94).

== Filmography ==
- In and Out of Africa (1992, with Ilisa Barbash)
- Made in USA (1997, with Ilisa Barbash)
- Sweetgrass (2009, with Ilisa Barbash)
- The High Trail (2010)
- Leviathan (2012, with Véréna Paravel)
- Caniba (2017, with Véréna Paravel)
- De Humani Corporis Fabrica (2022, with Véréna Paravel)

== Bibliography ==
- Visualizing Theory (1994)
- Cross-Cultural Filmmaking (1997, with Ilisa Barbash)
- Transcultural Cinema, essays by David MacDougall (1998)
- The Cinema of Robert Gardner (2008, with Ilisa Barbash)
