= Sensory Ethnography Lab =

Filmmaking and anthropology center at Harvard University

The Sensory Ethnography Lab (SEL) at Harvard University is an interdisciplinary center for the making of anthropologically informed works of media that combine aesthetics and ethnography. Production courses associated with the SEL are offered through Anthropology, Visual and Environmental Studies, and the Graduate School of Design.

== Background ==
Established as a collaboration between Harvard's departments of Anthropology and of Visual and Environmental Studies in 2006, the SEL provides technical facilities and support for Harvard's PhD in Media Anthropology, set up in 2007 as part of the graduate program in Social Anthropology. It has been praised as an "innovative initiative" at Harvard to integrate art-making within the cognitive life of the university, and was proposed as a model for future endeavors in the graduate curriculum by the Presidential Task Force on the Arts' Report in 2008. The SEL is directed by Lucien Castaing-Taylor, ethnographic filmmaker of In and Out of Africa and Sweetgrass. In the year-long core class, "Sensory Ethnography," students receive instruction in ethnographic media practices, and create a substantial work in video, still photography, hypermedia, or sound. Advanced graduate students are also provided with training and equipment to produce media ethnographies in conjunction with their written doctoral dissertations. One example includes students working alongside Ernst Karel and visual artist Sharon Lockhart to produce "Sound Safari", a collaborative phonography project, in Bath, Maine.

== Projects ==
=== Affiliates ===
- Silva, Jeff (Daniel). Ivan & Ivana
- Barbash, Ilisa and Castaing-Taylor, Lucien. Sweetgrass
- Karel, Ernst. Heard Laboratories
- Lockhart, Sharon. Lunch Break, Exit, Double Tide

=== Students ===
- On Broadway (Aryo Danusiri)
- Chaiqian (Demolition) (J.P. Sniadecki)
- As Long As There's Breath (Stephanie Spray)
