= San Francisco Bay Area Film Critics Circle Awards 2019 =

Annual US film awards ceremony

18th SFBAFCC Awards

December 16, 2019

Best Picture:
Once Upon a Time in Hollywood

Best Animated Feature:
I Lost My Body

Best Documentary:
Apollo 11

Best Foreign Language Film:
Parasite

The 18th San Francisco Bay Area Film Critics Circle Awards, honoring the best in film for 2019, were given on December 16, 2019.

== Winners and nominees ==
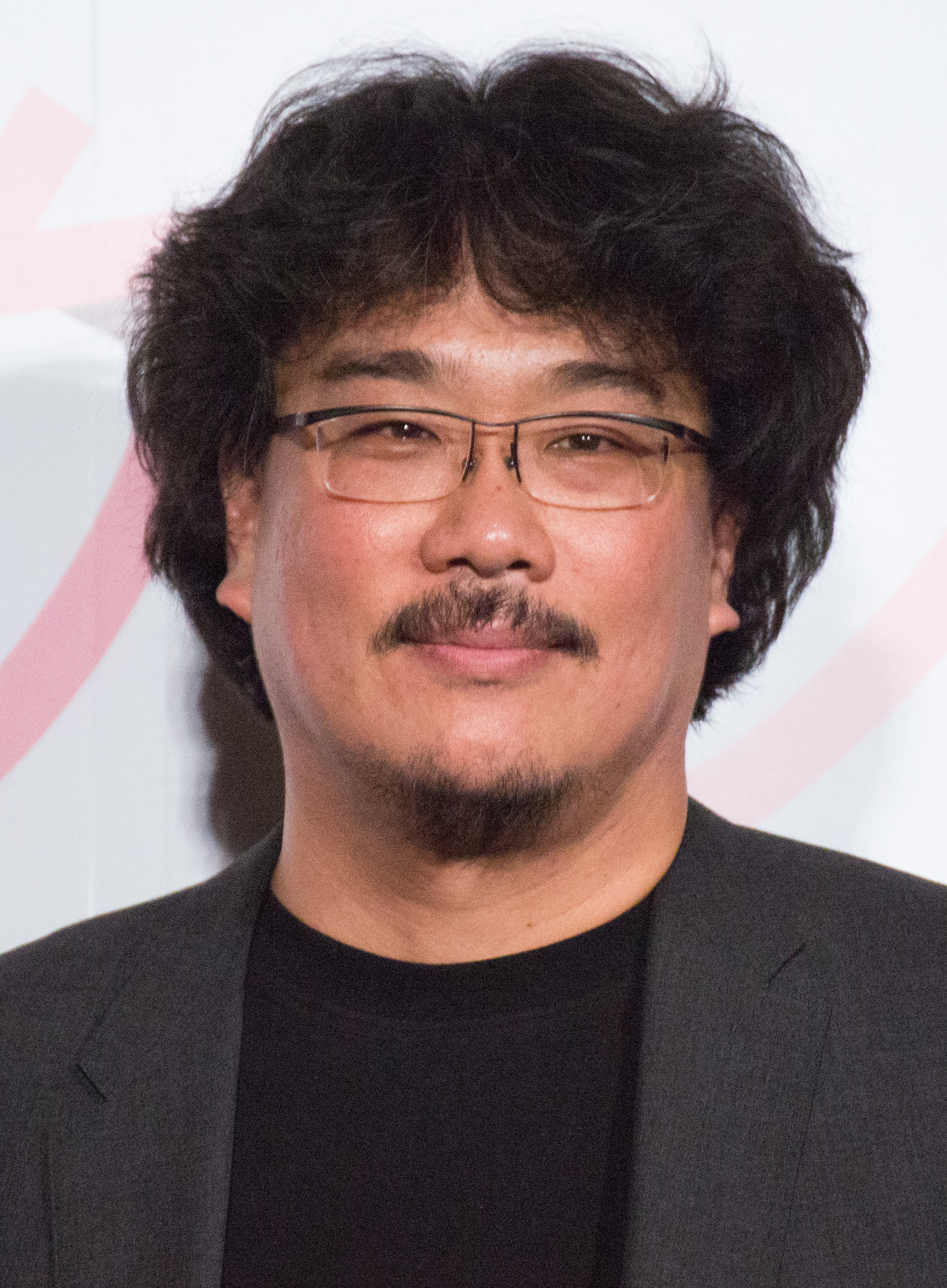
Bong Joon-ho, Best Director winner and Best Original Screenplay co-winner

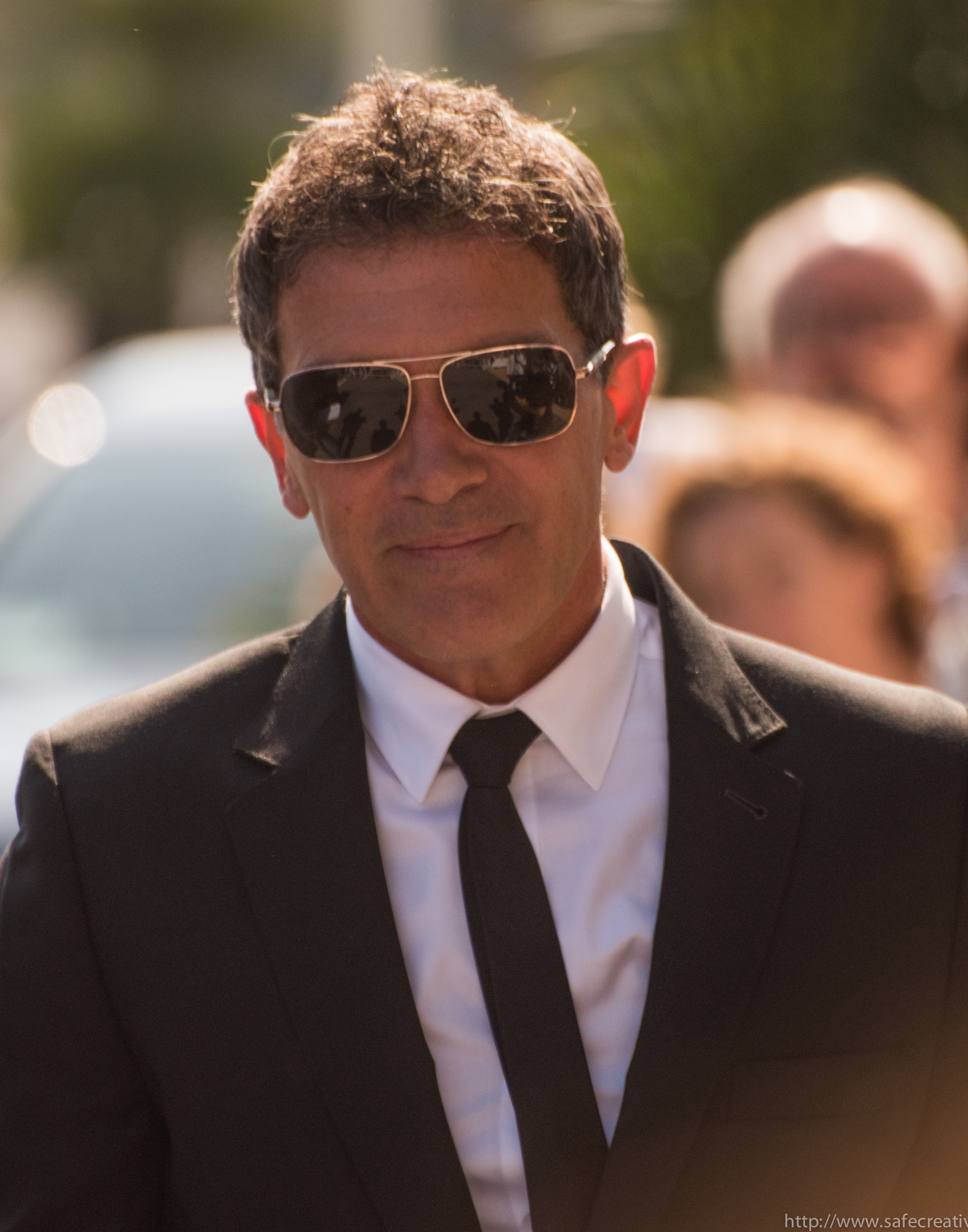
Antonio Banderas, Best Actor winner

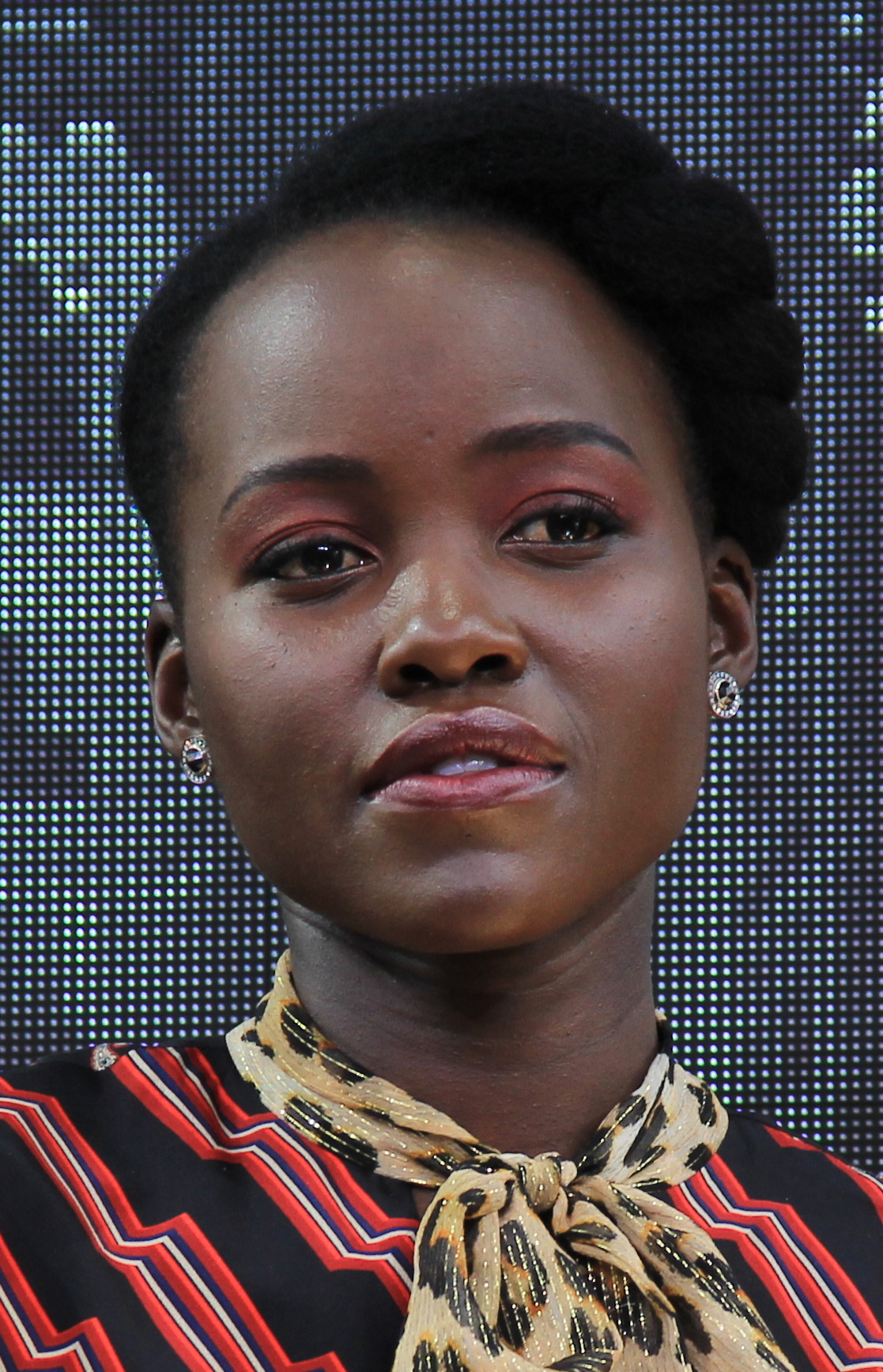
Lupita Nyong'o, Best Actress winner

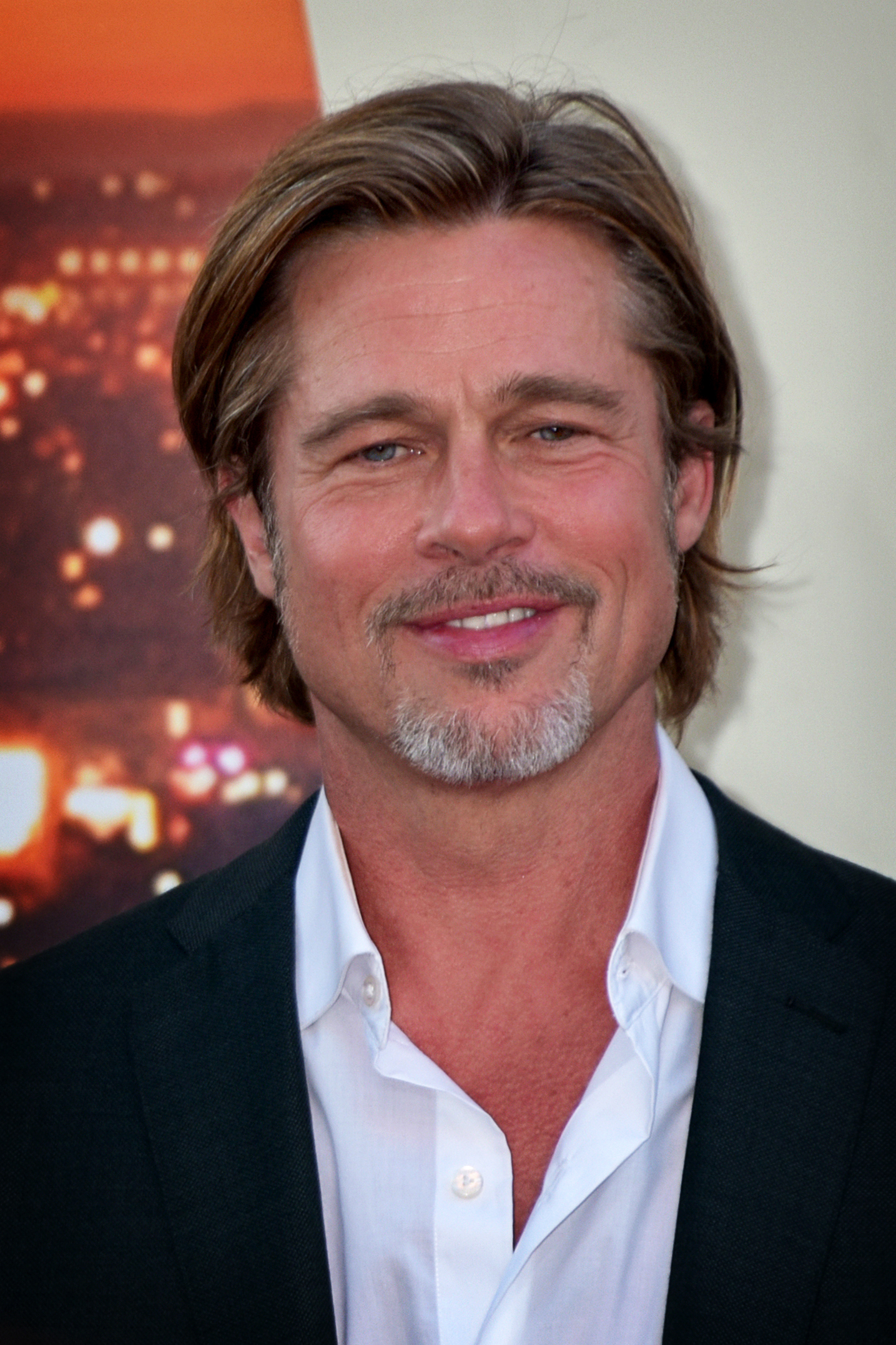
Brad Pitt, Best Supporting Actor winner

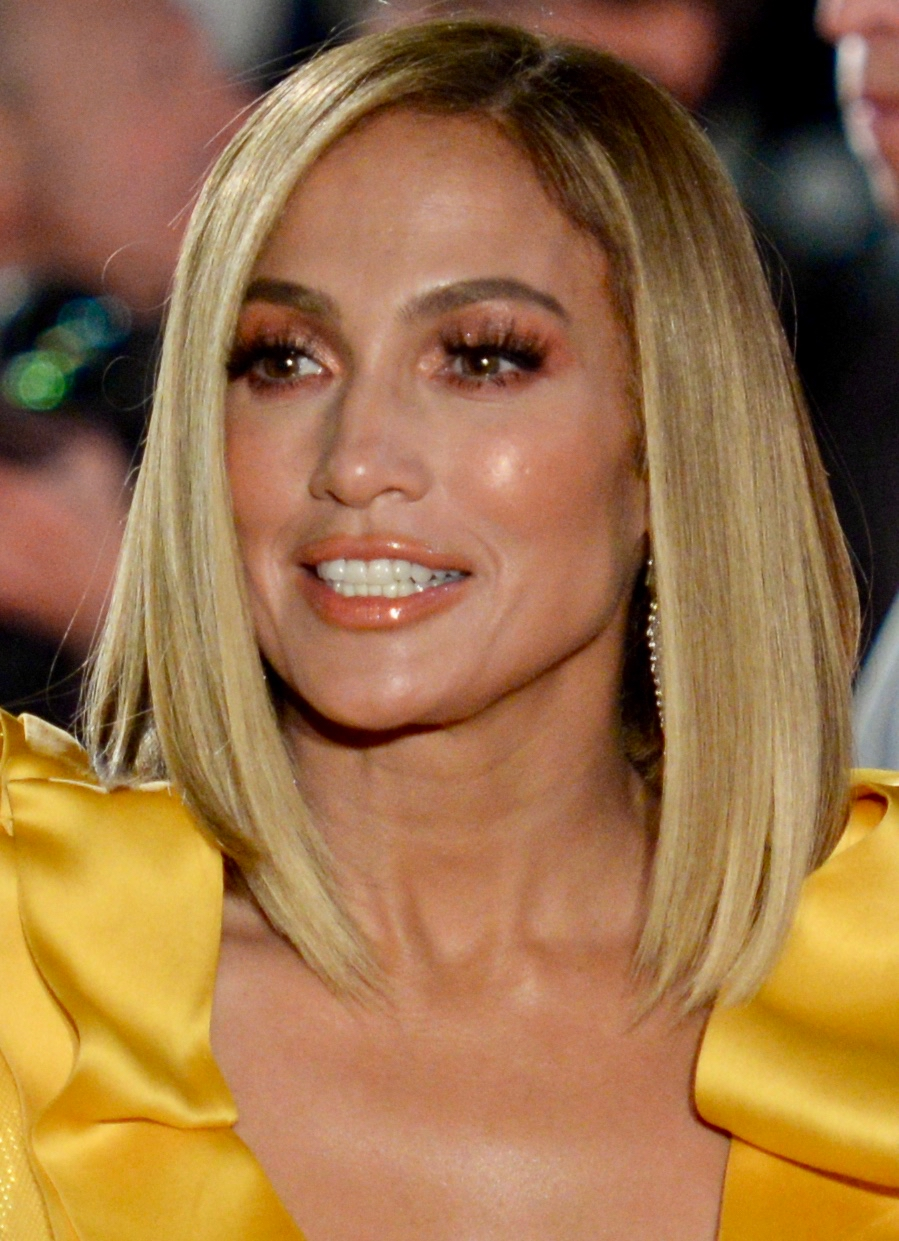
Jennifer Lopez, Best Supporting Actress winner

These are the nominees for the 18th SFFCC Awards. Winners are listed at the top of each list:

Best Picture	Best Director
Once Upon a Time in Hollywood; 1917; The Irishman; Marriage Story; Parasite	Bong Joon-ho – Parasite; Noah Baumbach – Marriage Story; Sam Mendes – 1917; Martin Scorsese – The Irishman; Joe Talbot – The Last Black Man in San Francisco; Quentin Tarantino – Once Upon a Time in Hollywood
Best Actor	Best Actress
Antonio Banderas – Pain and Glory; Leonardo DiCaprio – Once Upon a Time in Hollywood; Adam Driver – Marriage Story; Joaquin Phoenix – Joker; Adam Sandler – Uncut Gems	Lupita Nyong'o – Us; Awkwafina – The Farewell; Scarlett Johansson – Marriage Story; Charlize Theron – Bombshell; Alfre Woodard – Clemency
Best Supporting Actor	Best Supporting Actress
Brad Pitt – Once Upon a Time in Hollywood; Willem Dafoe – The Lighthouse; Song Kang-ho – Parasite; Al Pacino – The Irishman; Joe Pesci – The Irishman	Jennifer Lopez – Hustlers; Laura Dern – Marriage Story; Scarlett Johansson – Jojo Rabbit; Margot Robbie – Bombshell; Zhao Shu-zhen – The Farewell
Best Adapted Screenplay	Best Original Screenplay
Taika Waititi – Jojo Rabbit; Micah Fitzerman-Blue and Noah Harpster – A Beautiful Day in the Neighborhood; Greta Gerwig – Little Women; Lorene Scafaria – Hustlers; Steven Zaillian – The Irishman	Bong Joon-ho and Han Jin-won – Parasite; Noah Baumbach – Marriage Story; Rian Johnson – Knives Out; Quentin Tarantino – Once Upon a Time in Hollywood; Lulu Wang – The Farewell
Best Animated Feature	Best Documentary
I Lost My Body; How to Train Your Dragon: The Hidden World; Klaus; Missing Link; Toy Story 4	Apollo 11; American Factory; For Sama; Maiden; One Child Nation
Best Foreign Language Film	Best Cinematography
Parasite; Les Misérables; Pain and Glory; Portrait of a Lady on Fire; Transit	Roger Deakins – 1917; Jarin Blaschke – The Lighthouse; Adam Newport-Berra – The Last Black Man in San Francisco; Robert Richardson – Once Upon a Time in Hollywood; Jörg Widmer – A Hidden Life
Best Film Editing	Best Production Design
Andrew Buckland and Michael McCusker – Ford v Ferrari; Yang Jin-mo – Parasite; Fred Raskin – Once Upon a Time in Hollywood; Thelma Schoonmaker – The Irishman; Lee Smith – 1917	Barbara Ling – Once Upon a Time in Hollywood; Dennis Gassner – 1917; Regina Graves and Bob Shaw – The Irishman; Lee Ha-jun – Parasite; Henrik Svensson – Midsommar
Best Original Score	
Emile Mosseri – The Last Black Man in San Francisco; Alexandre Desplat – Little Women; Hildur Guðnadóttir – Joker; Randy Newman – Marriage Story; Thomas Newman – 1917	

== Special awards ==
=== Special Citation for Independent Cinema ===
- One Cut of the Dead, directed by Shin'ichirô Ueda
  - The Cat and the Moon, directed by Alex Wolff
  - Fiddler: A Miracle of Miracles, directed by Max Lewkowicz
  - Sócrates, directed by Alexandre Moratto

=== Marlon Riggs Award ===
- Jimmie Fails and Joe Talbot (awarded a to filmmaker(s) or individual(s) who represents courage and innovation in the world of cinema)
