= The Last Black Man in San Francisco (soundtrack) =

2019 film soundtrack album

The Last Black Man in San Francisco (Original Motion Picture Soundtrack)

Soundtrack album by Emile Mosseri
- Released: June 7, 2019
- Recorded: 2018–2019
- Studio: Proper Pop, Brooklyn, New York; The Green Room, North Hollywood, Los Angeles, California; Budapest Scoring, Budapest
- Genre: Film score
- Length: 45:53
- Label: Lakeshore
- Producer: Emile Mosseri

Emile Mosseri chronology
Random Acts of Flyness (2018)	The Last Black Man in San Francisco (2019)	Minari (2020)

The Last Black Man in San Francisco (Original Motion Picture Soundtrack) is the film score composed by Emile Mosseri to the 2019 film The Last Black Man in San Francisco directed by Joe Talbot. The film score was released through Lakeshore Records on June 7, 2019.

== Development ==
Emile Mosseri made his feature film debut through The Last Black Man in San Francisco, having previously wrote additional music for An Oversimplification of Her Beauty (2012) and the HBO television show Random Acts of Flyness (2018). As Joe Talbot was a fan of Random Acts of Flyness, Mosseri's agent contacted the director, as Talbot was looking for a composer for a long time. Mosseri submitted a musical demo piece, which was for the skateboarding scene which opens at the beginning of that film, that did not make it into the edit. This scene was temped by Michael Nyman's "Musique à Grande Vitesse: 3rd Region" to which Mosseri wrote a different piece to garner possible interest from the director. After a meeting with Talbot in three days, Mosseri was eventually hired for the project.

Mosseri began composing the film right after the meeting because of the tight deadline. He considered it as an intense project, working on it for four months, as the project was developed for ten years, and being considered a special project as it is the real life story on Jimmie Fails.

Mosseri wanted the film's music to not impact the licensed music utilized in the editing, such as Nyman's piece, Joni Mitchell's "Blue" and Jefferson Airplane's "Somebody to Love", which were song-based elements of the score which was designed to live next to those pieces of music. Apart from that there were overlaps in the music of composers which Talbot and Mosseri had liked, including the works of Randy Newman and Nicholas Britell; Newman's maiden song "I Think It's Going to Rain Today" had the lyrical, spiritual and song-based approach to scoring, which influenced Mosseri to write more music in the spirit of the film including some pieces he wrote to picture. Though the challenge being the romanticization of San Francisco, and finding the appropriate musical language, a lot of it was derived from the cinematography of Adam Newport-Berra which Mosseri had complimented owing to the visuals and imagery, that prompting something a regal and fairytale experiences.

Mosseri considered Jimmie as a deposed prince banished to the outskirts of his lair, and who cames back to reclaim his family throne, had a majestic quality which was alluded to the use of brass and woodwinds. English oboist and horn player Theodosia Russos contributed to most of the score, along with vocalists Camilla Gibson and Ralph Cato. Mosseri distinguished the score into two sides, which was the regal classical side and the lyrical song-based side, along with the church organ as the more spiritual side, representing Jimmie's relationship to the house, which was a religion to the former which he wanted to acknowledge with that musically. The friendship theme established earlier as audience accustomed to Jimmie and Monty, and their friendship, and it recurred throughout the film to provide such moments. It was designed a heartbreaking piece just as to empathise with the characters, and feel the emotional connection with them.

== Release ==
Lakeshore Records released the soundtrack on June 7, 2019, the same day as the film's release.

== Reception ==
Kambole Campbell of Empire wrote "Emile Mosseri's swooning and beautiful soundtrack matches the lovingly accomplished cinematography, creating an atmosphere that's both welcoming, and mournful for the slow death of a community." David Ehrlich of IndieWire called it a "gorgeous woodwind score, which sounds like a 21st century riff on the iconic music that Philip Glass wrote for "Koyaanisqatsi" — the contemporary feel isn't owed to any digital-age instrumentation, but rather just how exhausted the notes are. Glass' score reveled in the speed of change in the modern world, while Mosseri's is more of a requiem for it." Simran Hans of The Guardian wrote "Emile Mosseri's sweeping and optimistic woodwind score similarly emphasises the film's fable-like quality".

Peter Debruge of Variety wrote "the vibrant swells of Emile Mosseri's score sustain[s] our warm feeling toward its two characters [Jimmie and Monty]." Joe Morgenstern of The Wall Street Journal described it as "stirring music". Todd McCarthy of The Hollywood Reporter felt the score being apt for the film. Clarisse Loughrey of The Independent wrote "Emile Mosseri's score, too, is gorgeous – both swooning and elegiac." Justin Chang of NPR stated that Mosseri's score "verges on operatic, turning drab, forlorn moments into strangely ecstatic ones." Ann Hornaday of The Washington Post stated that the film has a "lilting woodwind musical score (composed with exquisite delicacy by Emile Mosseri)". Adam Graham of The Detroit News and Carlos Aguilar of TheWrap called it an "operatic" and "stirring".

== Track listing ==
No.	Title	Artist(s)	Length
1.	"King Jimmie"		1:08
2.	"The Last Black Man In San Francisco"		2:50
3.	"Bombing California St."		1:32
4.	"You're Not Better Than Us"		1:38
5.	"Black Alice in Wonderland"		1:19
6.	"San Francisco (Be Sure to Wear Flowers in Your Hair)"	Daniel Herskedal; Emile Mosseri; Joe Talbot; feat. Michael Marshall	2:52
7.	"A House, Haunted"	Royal Liverpool Philharmonic Orchestra; Michael Nyman Band	1:01
8.	"I Got a Plan"		0:49
9.	"Ricky, Get the Truck"		1:07
10.	"Driving Home with Stolen Treasures"		2:31
11.	"They Lost the House?"		1:18
12.	"Rock Fight"		1:10
13.	"The Last Black Man In San Francisco" (Prelude)		0:56
14.	"The Last Black Man In San Francisco"	Wounded Warrior	1:30
15.	"A House, Haunted" (Suite)		0:52
16.	"Whatever Gets You Through the Night"		1:40
17.	"King Jimmie" (Suite)		2:09
18.	"You're Not Better Than Us" (Demo)		1:33
19.	"Doubting Thomases on Segways" (Demo)		0:46
20.	"Montgomery's Theme"		1:15
21.	"My Grandfather Built This"		0:49
22.	"Filthy, Fishy Salt Water"		1:01
23.	"Rock Fight" (Suite)		1:19
24.	"You Sure They're Not Home?"		2:15
25.	"San Francisco (Be Sure to Wear Flowers in Your Hair)" (Instrumental)	Herskadall	1:54
26.	"How I Met Mont"	Jimmie Fails	8:39
Total length:			45:53

== Personnel ==
Credits adapted from liner notes:

- Music composer, producer and conductor – Emile Mosseri
- Superving orchestrator – Catherine Joy
- Orchestrators – Emile Mosseri, Joseph Carrill
- Bassoon – Monte Namadio
- Clarinet – Virginia Figueiredo
- Oboe, English Horn – Theodosia Roussos
- Saxophone – Alex Mathias
- Vocals – Kamilah Gibson, Ralph Cato
- Recording – Matt Basile, Brian Taylor
- Recording assistance – Robinton Hobbs
- Mixing – Brian Taylor
- Music editor – Julie Glaze Houlihan
- Executive producer – Brian McNelis, Skip Williamson
- Copyist – Nikhil Koparkar, Zoë Lustri
- A&R – Eric Craig
- Art direction – John Bergin

== Accolades ==
Award	Date of ceremony	Category	Recipients	Result	Ref.
Black Reel Awards	February 6, 2020	Outstanding Original Score	Emile Mosseri	Nominated	
Boston Society of Film Critics Awards	December 15, 2019	Best Original Score	Emile Mosseri	runner-up	
Chlotrudis Awards	March 17, 2019	Best Use of Music in a Film	Emile Mosseri	Nominated	
San Francisco Film Critics Circle	December 16, 2019	Best Original Score	Emile Mosseri	Won	
Seattle Film Critics Society	December 16, 2019	Best Original Score	Emile Mosseri	Nominated	
