= Boston Society of Film Critics Awards 2019 =

Annual US film awards ceremony

40th BSFC Awards

December 15, 2019

Best Film:
Little Women

The 40th Boston Society of Film Critics Awards, honoring the best in filmmaking in 2019, were given on December 15, 2019.

== Winners ==
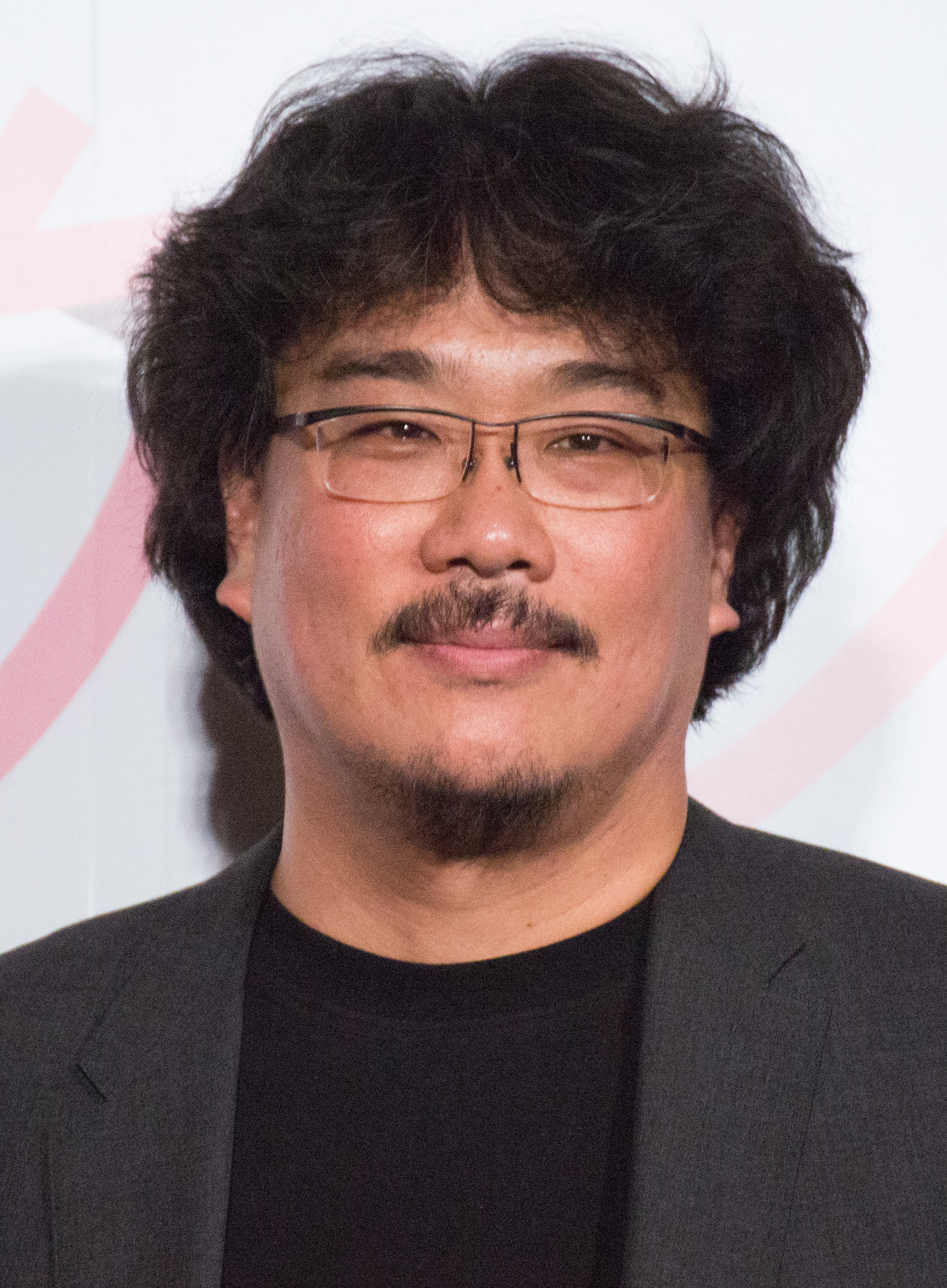
Bong Joon-ho, Best Director winner

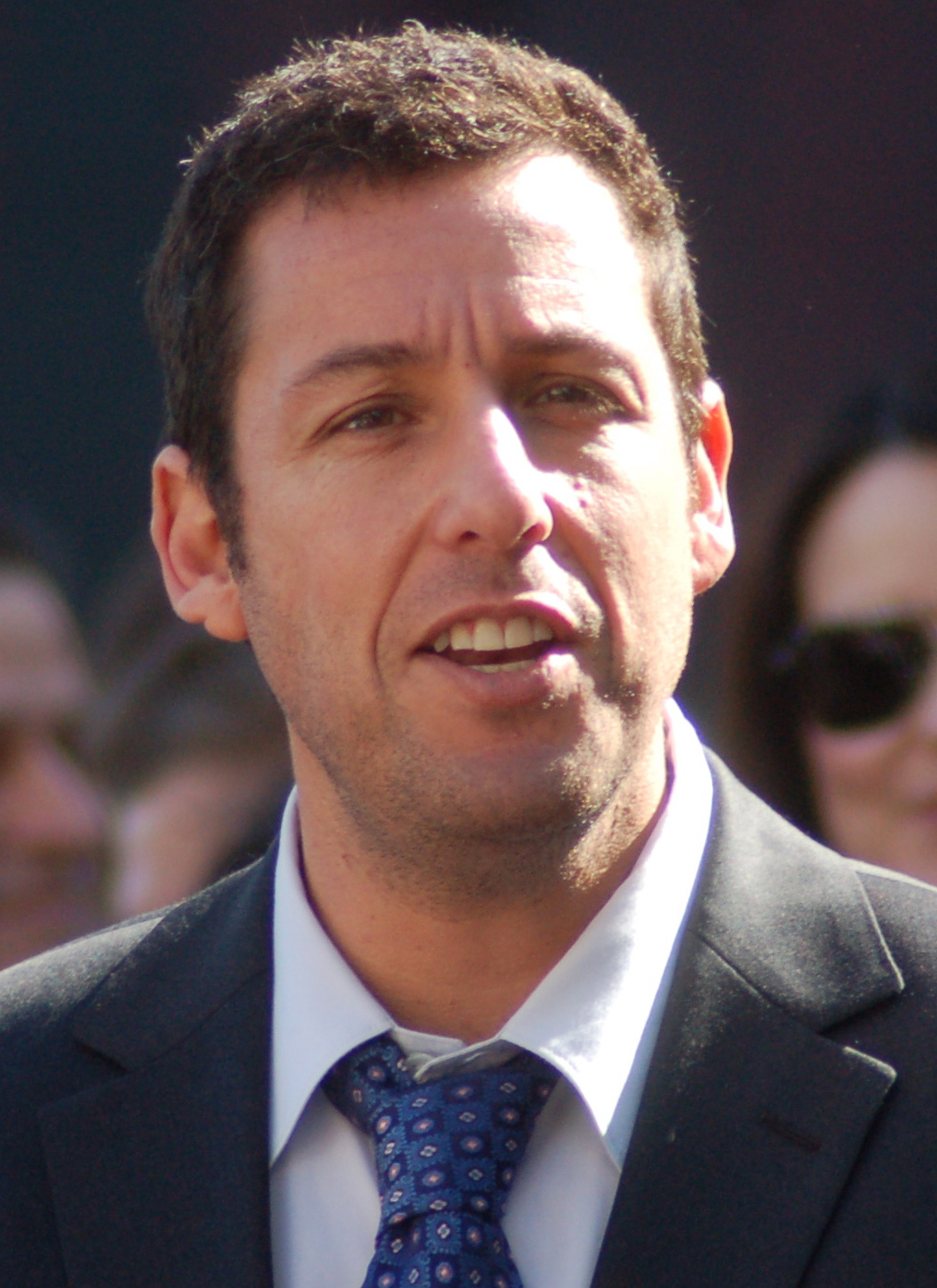
Adam Sandler, Best Actor winner

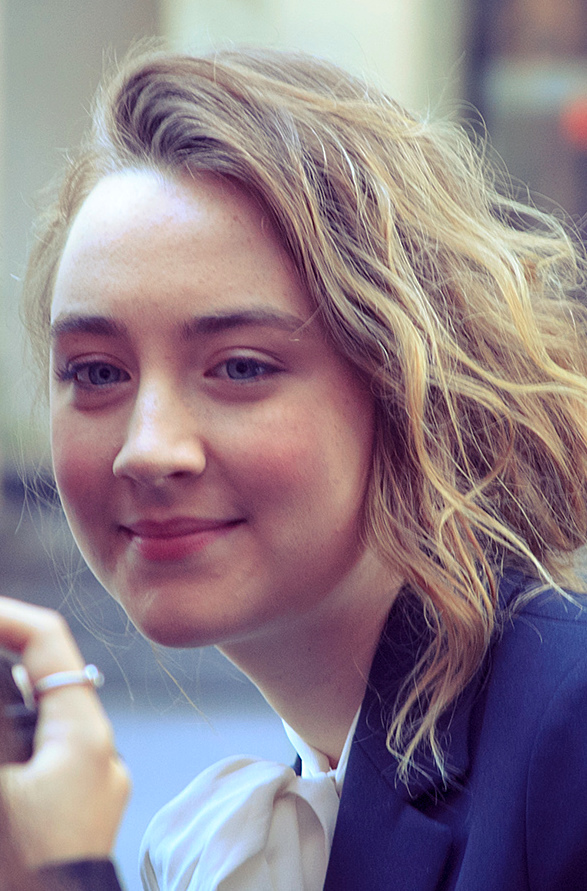
Saoirse Ronan, Best Actress winner

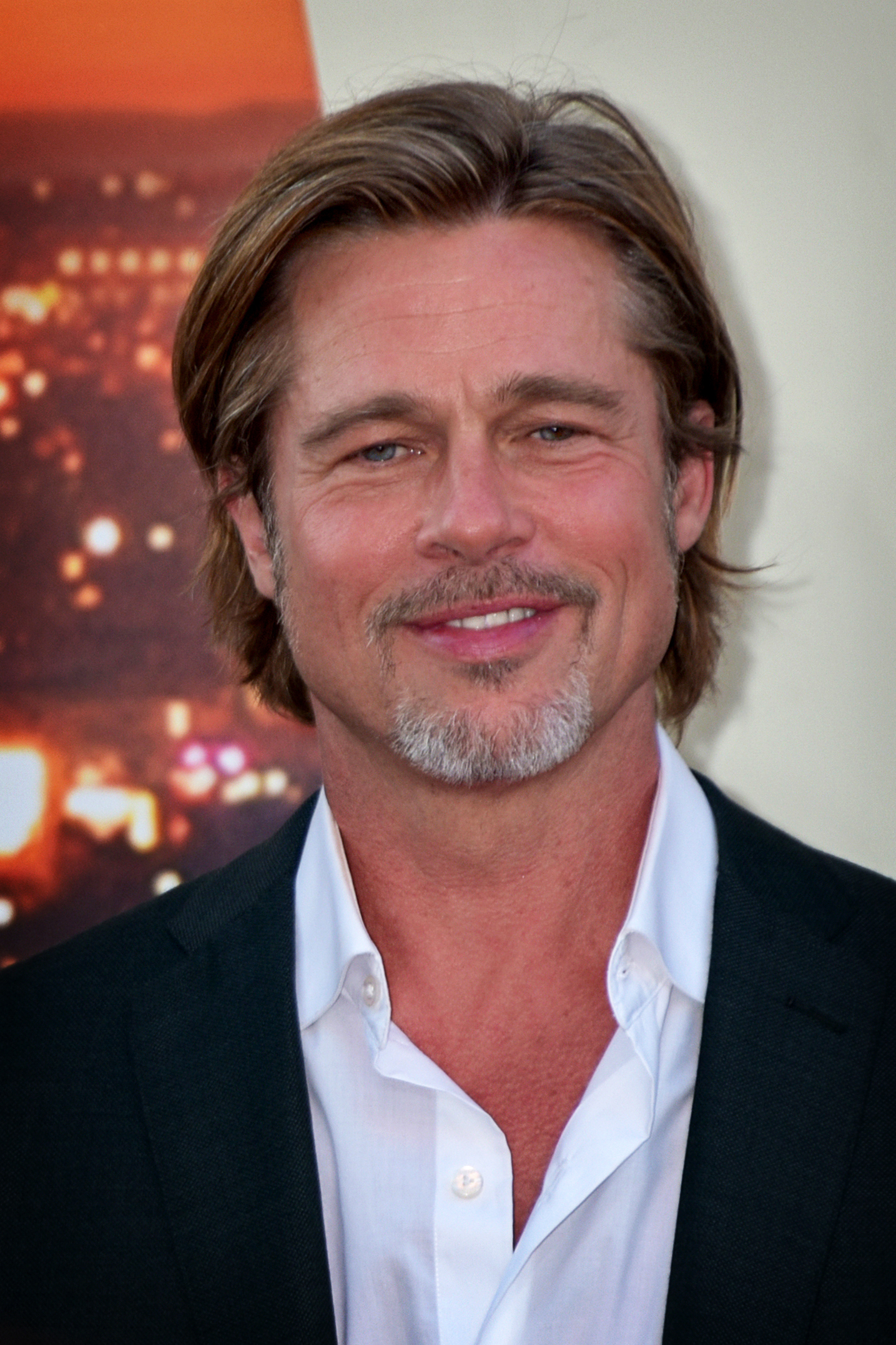
Brad Pitt, Best Supporting Actor winner

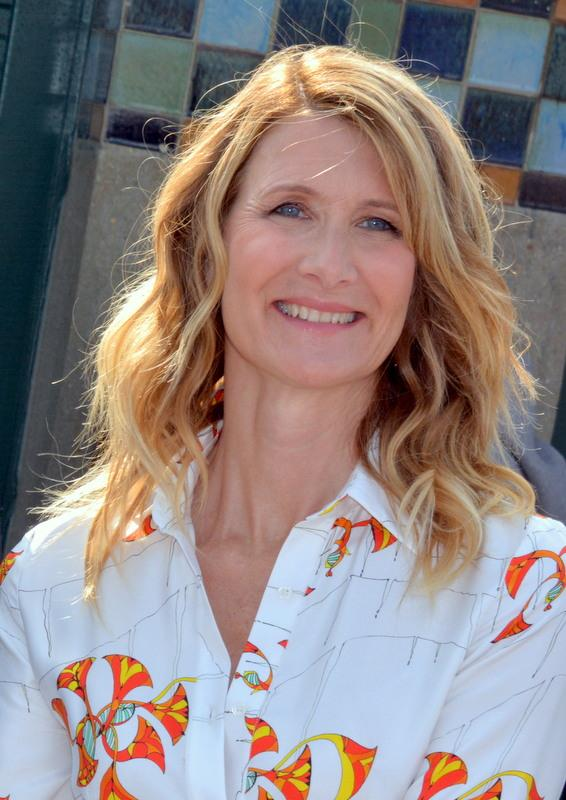
Laura Dern, Best Supporting Actress winner

- Best Film:
  - Little Women
    - Runner-up: Portrait of a Lady on Fire
- Best Director:
  - Bong Joon-ho – Parasite
    - Runner-up: Greta Gerwig – Little Women
- Best Actor:
  - Adam Sandler – Uncut Gems
    - Runner-up: Joaquin Phoenix – Joker
- Best Actress:
  - Saoirse Ronan – Little Women
    - Runners-up: Elisabeth Moss – Her Smell / Mary Kay Place – Diane
- Best Supporting Actor:
  - Brad Pitt – Once Upon a Time in Hollywood
    - Runner-up: Joe Pesci – The Irishman
- Best Supporting Actress:
  - Laura Dern – Marriage Story
    - Runner-up: Florence Pugh – Little Women
- Best Screenplay:
  - Quentin Tarantino – Once Upon a Time in Hollywood
    - Runners-up: Noah Baumbach – Marriage Story / Greta Gerwig – Little Women
- Best Animated Film:
  - I Lost My Body
    - Runner-up: Toy Story 4
- Best Foreign Language Film:
  - Parasite
    - Runner-up: Portrait of a Lady on Fire
- Best Documentary:
  - Honeyland
    - Runners-up: Apollo 11 / Hail Satan?
- Best Cinematography:
  - Claire Mathon – Portrait of a Lady on Fire
    - Runner-up: Robert Richardson – Once Upon a Time in Hollywood
- Best Editing:
  - Thelma Schoonmaker – The Irishman
    - Runner-up: Ronald Bronstein and Josh Safdie – Uncut Gems
- Best Original Score:
  - Alexandre Desplat – Little Women
    - Runner-up: Emile Mosseri – The Last Black Man in San Francisco
- Best New Filmmaker:
  - Joe Talbot – The Last Black Man in San Francisco
    - Runner-up: Mati Diop – Atlantics
- Best Ensemble Cast:
  - Little Women
    - Runners-up: Once Upon a Time in Hollywood / Parasite
