= Minari (soundtrack) =

Minari (Original Motion Picture Soundtrack)

Soundtrack album by Emile Mosseri
- Released: December 11, 2020
- Recorded: 2020
- Length: 33:09
- Language: Korean
- Label: Milan

Emile Mosseri chronology
The Last Black Man in San Francisco (2019)	Minari (Original Motion Picture Soundtrack) (2020)	Kajillionaire (2020)

Singles from Minari: Original Motion Picture Soundtrack
- 1. "Rain Song" Released: November 20, 2020

Minari (Original Motion Picture Soundtrack) is the soundtrack to the 2020 film of the same name released by Milan Records on December 11, 2020. The score, composed by Emile Mosseri, met with critical acclaim and has been nominated for numerous accolades including the Academy Award for Best Original Score and BAFTA Award for Best Original Music, among others. The soundtrack was preceded by the single "Rain Song" released on November 20, 2020.

== Development ==
Mosseri scored the film using only the script as a reference rather than a locked cut. Editor Harry Yoon opted not to use temp tracks and instead cut the film around Mosseri's demos, which were later fleshed out into full recordings.

The Fames Macedonian Symphonic Orchestra performed the score with over 40 string players. As with Mosseri's previous ventures, the film consisted of new ivories. Initially he wanted to use a new piano for each project traded from local Los Angeles company. However, due to the short duration he had scoring the film while finishing Kajillionaire (2020) he intended to use the same Yamaha piano, although he never felt the sounds necessary the same and was different from the 1940s guitar he had. He detuned the guitar to as low so that it could hold intonation and then doubled it with the piano to give it a grounded quality and not exactly sound exactly like guitar and piano. Mosseri admitted that "when those two sounds are married, it creates a third sound".

Mosseri wrote and recorded a demo for "Rain Song", which he sent to Chung while suggesting the lead actress Han Ye-ri record the vocals. He felt that the song was to be a lullaby from Monica (Ye-ri) to her son David (Alan Kim), hence the suggestion it would be appropriate for her to sing the vocals. Stephane Hong translated the English lyrics into Korean.

== Track listing ==
Original track list
No.	Title	Length
1.	"Intro"	1:39
2.	"Jacob and the Stone"	1:39
3.	"Big Country"	2:16
4.	"Garden of Eden"	1:36
5.	"Rain Song" (performed by Han Ye-ri)	2:13
6.	"Grandma Picked a Good Spot"	3:30
7.	"Halmeoni"	1:24
8.	"Jacob's Prayer"	1:35
9.	"Wind Song" (performed by Han Ye-ri)	2:42
10.	"Birdslingers"	1:53
11.	"Oklahoma City"	1:09
12.	"Minari Suite"	3:49
13.	"You'll Be Happy"	0:53
14.	"Paul's Antiphony"	1:54
15.	"Find It Every Time"	2:03
16.	"Outro"	2:54
Total length:		33:09

== Reception ==
Music critic Jonathan Broxton wrote "Minari is a surface level score; it sits on top of the narrative creating an overarching mood, a pervasive tone, but never actually gets into the meat of the storytelling craft that is at the heart of good cinema." James Southall of Movie Wave called it as a "a distinctive score, one which achieves its emotional support in unusual and creative ways, and it makes for a really satisfying album." Richard Lawson of Vanity Fair complimented Mosseri's score as "a woozy chorus, sounding like a lullaby". Glenn Whipp of Los Angeles Times called the score as "sublime". Benjamin Lee of The Guardian called it as a "hair-raising score" that only "increases in stature as the film progresses". It has been listed by IndieWire as one of the "best film scores of 2020".

== Accolades ==
Award	Date of ceremony	Category	Recipient(s)	Result	Ref.
Academy Awards	April 25, 2021	Best Original Score	Emile Mosseri	Nominated	
Austin Film Critics Association	March 19, 2021	Best Original Score	Emile Mosseri	Won	
British Academy Film Awards	April 11, 2021	Best Original Music	Emile Mosseri	Nominated	
Boston Society of Film Critics	December 13, 2020	Best Original Score	Emile Mosseri	Won	
Critics' Choice Awards	March 7, 2021	Best Score	Emile Mosseri	Nominated	
Hollywood Critics Association Awards	March 5, 2021	Best Score	Emile Mosseri	Nominated	
Hollywood Music in Media Awards	January 27, 2021	Best Original Score in an Independent Film	Emile Mosseri	Won	
Hollywood Music in Media Awards	January 27, 2021	Best Original Song in an Independent Film	"Rain Song" – Emile Mosseri and Stefanie Hong	Nominated	
Online Film Critics Society	January 25, 2021	Best Original Score	Emile Mosseri	Nominated	
Satellite Awards	February 15, 2021	Best Original Score	Emile Mosseri	Nominated	
Seattle Film Critics Society	February 15, 2021	Best Original Score	Emile Mosseri	Nominated	
Washington D.C. Area Film Critics Association	February 8, 2021	Best Original Score	Emile Mosseri	Nominated	
