= Black Reel Award for Outstanding Original Score =

Motion picture award for music

Black Reel Award for Outstanding Score
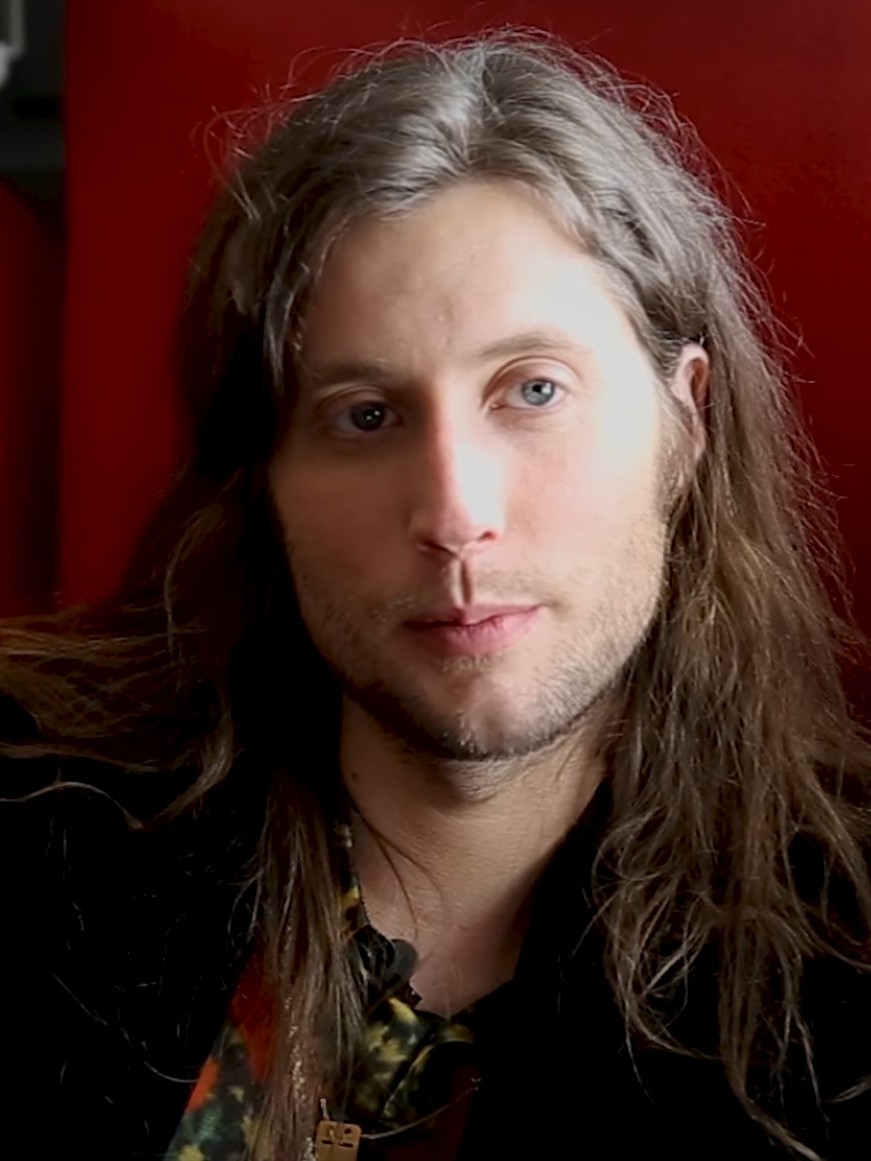
- The 2026 recipient: Ludwig Göransson
- Country: United States
- Presented by: The Black Reel Awards (BRAs)
- First award: Black Reel Awards of 2005
- Most recent winner: Ludwig Göransson; Sinners (2026)
- Website: blackreelawards.com

This article lists the winners and nominees for the Black Reel Award for Outstanding Original Score. This award is given to the film composers and was first awarded during the 2005 ceremony. Michael Abels & Nicholas Britell currently holds the record for most wins in this category.

== Winners and nominees ==
Winners are listed first and highlighted in bold.

=== 2000s ===
Year	Composer	Film	Ref
2005
2005	**Ray Charles and Stephen Altman**	**Ray**	
2005	Terence Blanchard	She Hate Me	
2005	RZA	Kill Bill: Volume 2	
2006	—N/a		
2007
2007	**Harvey Mason Jr. and Damon Thomas**	**Dreamgirls**	
2007	Big Boi	Idlewild	
2007	Terence Blanchard	Inside Man	
2007	Lisa Coleman and Wendy Melvoin	Something New	
2007	Aaron Zigman	Akeelah and the Bee	
2008
2008	**A. R. Rahman**	**Slumdog Millionaire**	
2008	Terence Blanchard and Steve Jordan	Cadillac Records	
2008	Stanley Clarke	Soul Men	
2008	Mason Daring	Honeydripper	
2008	Steve Isles	RocknRolla	

=== 2010s ===
Year	Composer	Film	Ref
2010	—N/a		
2011
2011	**The Roots**	**Night Catches Us**	
2011	James Horner	The Karate Kid	
2011	Atticus Ross and Leopold Ross	The Book of Eli	
2011	Marcelo Zarvos	Brooklyn's Finest	
2011	Aaron Zigman	For Colored Girls	
2012
2012	**Thomas Newman**	**The Help**	
2012	Harry Escott	Shame	
2012	Alex Heffes	The First Grader	
2012	Steven Price	Attack the Block	
2012	Misha Segal	Mooz-lum	
2013
2013	**Dan Romer and Benh Zeitlin**	**Beasts of the Southern Wild**	
2013	Terence Blanchard	Red Tails	
2013	Kathryn Bostic	Middle of Nowhere	
2013	Bruce Hornsby	Red Hook Summer	
2013	Salaam Remi	Sparkle	
2014
2014	**Hans Zimmer**	**12 Years a Slave**	
2014	Stanley Clarke	The Best Man Holiday	
2014	Ludwig Göransson	Fruitvale Station	
2014	Mark Isham	42	
2014	Rodrigo Leao	The Butler	
2015
2015	**Jason Moran**	**Selma**	
2015	Terence Blanchard	Black or White	
2015	Kathryn Bostic	Dear White People	
2015	Danny Bramson and Waddy Wachtel	Jimi: All Is by My Side	
2015	Mark Isham	Beyond the Lights	
2016
2016	**Joseph Trapanese**	**Straight Outta Compton**	
2016	Terence Blanchard	Chi-Raq	
2016	Germaine Franco	Dope	
2016	Ludwig Göransson	Creed	
2016	Dan Romer	Beast of No Nation	
2017
2017	**Nicholas Britell**	**Moonlight**	
2017	Robert Glasper	Miles Ahead	
2017	Henry Jackman	The Birth of a Nation	
2017	Benjamin Wallfisch, Pharrell Williams and Hans Zimmer	Hidden Figures	
2017	Marcelo Zarvos	Fences	
2018
2018	**Michael Abels**	**Get Out**	
2018	James Newton Howard	Detroit	
2018	David Newman	Girls Trip	
2018	Roger Suen	Gook	
2018	Marcus Miller	Marshall	
2019
2019	**Nicholas Britell**	**If Beale Street Could Talk**	
2019	Terence Blanchard	BlacKkKlansman	
2019	Ludwig Göransson	Black Panther	
2019	Ludwig Göransson	Creed II	
2019	Dustin O'Halloran	The Hate U Give	

=== 2020s ===
Year	Composer	Film	Ref
2020
2020	**Michael Abels**	**Us**	
2020	Scott Bomar	Dolemite Is My Name	
2020	Emile Mosseri	The Last Black Man in San Francisco	
2020	Devonté Hynes	Queen & Slim	
2020	Atticus Ross and Trent Reznor	Waves	
2021
2021	**Trent Reznor**, **Atticus Ross** and **Jon Batiste**	**Soul**	
2021	Guy C. Routte	The Forty-Year-Old Version	
2021	John Debney	Jingle Jangle: A Christmas Journey	
2021	Robert Glasper	The Photograph	
2021	Fabrice Lecomte	Sylvie's Love	
2022
2022	**Jeymes Samuel**	**The Harder They Fall**	
2022	Robert Akiki Aubrey Lowe	Candyman	
2022	Alex Lacamoire, Lin-Manuel Miranda & Bill Sherman	In the Heights	
2022	Devonté Hynes	Passing	
2022	Kris Bowers	Respect	
2023
2023	**Terence Blanchard**	**The Woman King**	
2023	Common	Alice	
2023	Craig DeLeon	End of the Road	
2023	Tanerélle and Bartek Gliniak	Nanny	
2023	Michael Abels	Nope	
2024
2024	**Kris Bowers**	**The Color Purple**	
2024	Jon Batiste	American Symphony	
2024	Kris Bowers	Chevalier	
2024	Branford Marsalis	Rustin	
2024	Desmond Murray and Pierre Charles	They Cloned Tyrone	
2025
2025	**Kris Bowers**	**The Wild Robot**	
2025	Chanda Dancy	Blink Twice	
2025	Kris Bowers	Bob Marley: One Love	
2025	Tamar-kali	The Fire Inside	
2025	Jon Batiste	Saturday Night	
2026
2026	**Ludwig Göransson**	**Sinners**	
2026	Kathryn Bostic	Sarah's Oil	
2026	Howard Drossin	Highest 2 Lowest	
2026	Hildur Guðnadóttir	Hedda	
2026	Raphael Saadiq	Freaky Tales	

== Multiple nominations and wins ==
=== Multiple wins ===
2 wins

- Michael Abels
- Kris Bowers
- Nicholas Britell

=== Multiple nominations ===
8 nominations

- Terence Blanchard

5 nominations

- Kris Bowers
- Ludwig Göransson

3 nominations

- Michael Abels
- Jon Batiste
- Kathryn Bostic
- Atticus Ross

2 nominations

- Stanley Clarke
- Nicholas Britell
- Robert Glasper
- Devonté Hynes
- Mark Isham
- Trent Reznor
- Dan Romer
- Marcelo Zarvos
- Aaron Zigman
- Hans Zimmer
