= Margaret Talbot =

American essayist and non-fiction writer

- Talbot in 2026
- Occupations: Journalist; essayist; writer
- Parent(s): Lyle Talbot; Margaret Epple
- Relatives: Joe Talbot
- Writing career
- Genre: Nonfiction
- Notable awards: Whiting Award (1999)
- Website: margarettalbot.com

Margaret Talbot is an American journalist and nonfiction writer. She is the daughter of the veteran Warner Bros. actor Lyle Talbot, whom she profiled in an October 2012 article of The New Yorker and in her book The Entertainer: Movies, Magic and My Father's Twentieth Century (Riverhead Books, 2012). She is also the co-author with her brother David Talbot of a book about political activists in the 1960s, By the Light of Burning Dreams (HarperCollins, 2021).

== Life ==
She is a staff writer at The New Yorker. She has also written for The New Republic, The New York Times Magazine, and The Atlantic Monthly. and was a regular panelist on the Slate podcast "The DoubleX Gabfest".

Her first book, The Entertainer: Movies, Magic, and My Father's Twentieth Century, was published in November 2012 by Riverhead.

Her second book, co-authored with brother David, By the Light of Burning Dreams: The Triumphs and Tragedies of the Second American Revolution, was published in June 2021 by HarperCollins.

She was formerly a Senior Fellow at the New America Foundation.

Her brother Stephen Talbot is a public television documentary producer. Filmmaker Joe Talbot is her nephew.

== Awards ==
- 1999 Whiting Award

== Bibliography ==
=== Books ===
- Talbot, Margaret (2012). The entertainer: movies, magic, and my father's Twentieth Century. Riverhead.
- Talbot, David & Margaret Talbot (2021). By the light of burning dreams: the triumphs and tragedies of the second American revolution. New York: Harper.

=== Essays and reporting ===
- Talbot, Margaret (January 9, 2000). "The placebo prescription". Magazine. The New York Times.
- — (February 24, 2002). "Girls just want to be mean". Magazine. The New York Times.
- — (March 30, 2003). "A woman's work?". Magazine. The New York Times.'
- — (May 12, 2008). "Birdbrain". A Reporter at Large. The New Yorker.
- — (November 3, 2008). "Red sex, Blue sex". Dept. of Disputation. The New Yorker.
- — (April 27, 2009). "Brain gain: the underground world of 'neuroenhancing' drugs". A Reporter at Large. The New Yorker.
- — (January 2, 2012). "Stumptown Girl". Onward and Upward with the Arts. The New Yorker. 87 (42): 24–29. (Note: Discusses Portlandia, Carrie Brownstein, Fred Armisen)
- — (April 16, 2012). "Girls will be Girls". The Talk of the Town. Comment. The New Yorker. 88 (9): 39–40. (Note: Lena Dunham's Girls.)
- — (March 11, 2013). "Higher authorities". The Talk of the Town. Comment. The New Yorker. 89 (4): 17–18.
- — (March 18, 2013). "About a boy: transgender surgery at sixteen". A Reporter at Large. The New Yorker. 89 (5): 56–65.
- — (April 15, 2013). "Shots in the dark". The Talk of the Town. Comment. The New Yorker. 89 (9): 21–22.
- — (May 13, 2013). "Game change". The Talk of the Town. Comment. The New Yorker. 89 (13): 21–22.
- — (October 21, 2013). "Gone girl: the extraordinary resilience of Elizabeth Smart". American Chronicles. The New Yorker. 89 (33): 32–38.
- — (October 28, 2013). "Home movies: Alexander Payne, High Plains auteur". Profiles. The New Yorker. 89 (34): 50–59.
- — (January 12, 2015). "The talking cure". Annals of Education. The New Yorker. 90 (43): 38–47.
- — (February 16, 2015). "Not immune". The Talk of the Town. Comment. The New Yorker. 91 (1): 19–20.
- — (December 19–26, 2016). "Women in the White House". The Talk of the Town. Comment. The New Yorker. 92 (42): 43–44.
- Talbot, Margaret & Philip Montgomery (October 30, 2017). "Faces of an epidemic: in Montgomery County, Ohio, opioid addiction permeates everyday life". Portfolio. The New Yorker. 93 (34): 50–59. (Note: Photographs by Philip Montgomery)
- Talbot, Margaret (April 2, 2018). "Dirty politics: Scott Pruitt's E.P.A. is giving even ostentatious polluters a reprieve". A Reporter at Large. The New Yorker. 94 (7): 38–51. (Note: Online version is titled "Scott Pruitt's dirty politics".)
- — (February 11, 2019). "Not working". The Talk of the Town. Comment. The New Yorker. 94 (48): 15–16. (Note: Online version is titled "Trump's state of disunion".)
- — (June 3, 2019). "No mercy". The Talk of the Town. Comment. The New Yorker. 95 (15): 15–16. (Note: Online version is titled "The challenge at the border shows no signs of abating".)
- — (November 18, 2019). "The pivotal Justice". Profiles. The New Yorker. 95 (36): 36–49. (Note: Online version is titled "Is the Supreme Court's fate in Elena Kagan's hands?".)
- — (September 20, 2021). "The real Roe: what we can learn from the all-too-human plaintiff behind Roe v. Wade". The Critics. Books. The New Yorker. 97 (29): 66–71. (Note: Online version is titled "How the real Jane Roe shaped the abortion wars".)
- — (September 27, 2021). "A necessary right". The Talk of the Town. Comment. The New Yorker. 97 (30): 21–22. (Note: Online version is titled "The Supreme Court and the future of Roe v. Wade".)
- — (September 5, 2022). "The last word: Justice Samuel Alito's crusade against a secular America isn't over". Profiles. The New Yorker. 98 (27): 24–37. (Note: Online version is titled "Justice Alito's crusade against a secular America isn't over".)

=== Anthologies ===
- Matt Ridley, ed. (2002). The Best American Science Writing 2002. HarperCollins. ISBN 978-0-06-093650-1.
- Talbot, Margaret (2005). "Material girls". In Peri, Camille & Kate Moses (eds.). Because I said so: 33 mothers write about children, sex, men, aging, faith, race, and themselves. HarperCollins.

=== Book reviews ===
Year	Review article	Work(s) reviewed
2009	Talbot, Margaret (January–February 2009). "Courage in profiles: how Marjorie Williams rendered the lives of Washington's powerful". Washington Monthly: 52–54.	Williams, Marjorie. Timothy Noah (ed.). Reputation: portraits in power. Public Affairs.
