= Max Lewkowicz =

Canadian writer, producer and director

- Education: Bachelor's from McGill University; Graduate of New York University's School of Arts and Science
- Occupations: Director, Producer, and Writer
- Known for: Director, producer, and writer of Fiddler: A Miracle of Miracles
- Notable work: Fiddler: A Miracle of Miracles; Underfire: The Untold Story of Pfc. Tony Vaccaro
- Awards: New York Emmy Award Silver Screen Award at the U.S. International Film and Video Festival; Grand Prize of The Chicago Film Festival; 2003 Award of Excellence from the National Association of Museum Exhibitions "The Chosen Film" at the Toronto Jewish Film Festival; Audience Favorite Award at the Mayerson JCC Jewish & Israeli Film Festival Fan Favorite Award at the Sarasota-Manatee Jewish Film Festival

Max Lewkowicz is a Canadian writer, producer, director, and the founder and owner of Dog Green Productions. He is best known for his work as director, producer, and writer of Fiddler: A Miracle of Miracles (2019), Underfire: The Untold Story of Pfc. Tony Vaccaro (2016) and Morgenthau: Three Men, Three Generations, One Fight (2013).

== Education ==
Lewkowicz attained his bachelor's degree at McGill University in Montreal, and attained his Master's in Communications at New York University in New York City.

== Career ==
After graduating college, Lewkowicz started out taking part in TV commercials, then he moved on to working with Holocaust museums, as well as filming documentaries and short interviews. Later, he moved onto being a director on bigger features for HBO and PBS.

Lewkowicz has directed, produced, and written many documentary films including: Morgenthau: Three Men, Three Generations, One Fight (2013), Underfire: The Untold Story of Pfc. Tony Vaccaro (2016), and his most well-known and recent work Fiddler: A Miracle of Miracles (2019). Lewkowicz is also the founder of Dog Green Productions, a media production company that creates historical and military presentations. Additionally, he has worked on TV commercials, worked with Holocaust museums, and directed HBO and PBS shows in his early career.

=== Documentaries ===
- Lewkowicz et al. (2019). Fiddler: A Miracle of Miracles, published by Roadside Attractions.
  - "The Chosen Film" at the Toronto Jewish Film Festival.
  - Won the Audience Favorite Award at the Mayerson JCC Jewish & Israeli Film Festival.
  - Won the Fan Favorite Award at the Sarasota-Manatee Jewish Film Festival.
  - A feature in the Calgary International Film Festival.
- Lewkowicz et al. (2016). Underfire: The Undtold Story of Pfc. Tony Voccaro.
  - Won a New York Emmy.
- Lewkowicz et al. (2013). Morgenthau: Three Men, Three Generations, One Fight.

=== Awards ===
Lewkowicz's work has won the Silver Screen Award at the U.S. International Film and Video Festival, the grand prize of The Chicago International Film Festival, and the 2003 Award of Excellence from the National Association of Museum Exhibitions. He has won the New York Emmy for his feature film Morgenthau: Three Men, Three Generation, One Fight. Fiddler: A Miracle of Miracles was deemed "The Chosen Film" as the audience favorite at the Toronto Jewish Film Festival. Additionally, Fiddler: A Miracle of Miracles won the Audience Favorite Award at the Mayerson JCC Jewish & Israeli Film Festival, the Fan Favorite Award at the Sarasota-Manatee Jewish Film Festival, in addition to having been premiered in the United States at the Washington Jewish Film Festival.

== Life ==
=== Family ===
Lewkowicz is a Canadian citizen, as well as the son of a Holocaust survivor. His mother is a holocaust survivor, one who had been through the struggle in Auschwitz and barely survived the brutality of the Nazis. She is originally from Krakow, Poland, which is later referenced in Fiddler: Miracle of Miracles.
