= Stevens Center =

Performing arts center in Winston-Salem, North Carolina

Coordinates: 36.098458°N 80.248178°W

The Roger L. Stevens Center is the primary performance venue in downtown Winston-Salem, North Carolina, and is owned and operated by the University of North Carolina School of the Arts. It is named after the theatre producer and real estate magnate Roger L. Stevens and was opened on April 22, 1983. The venue serves the major UNCSA productions, the Winston-Salem Symphony, Piedmont Opera, and many other touring and local productions. All in all the theatre is used for rehearsal or performance all but 70 days of the year.

== History ==
The Stevens Center was originally the Carolina Theater, a movie theatre, before it was donated to the School of the Arts in 1980 by the Winston-Salem Journal. It was renovated by the School of the Arts using $9.6 million in state bond money and opened on April 22, 1983, with a star-studded gala featuring the UNCSA symphony Orchestra with Leonard Bernstein conducting and Isaac Stern as soloist, and Gregory Peck as the master of ceremonies. Guests in attendance included Agnes de Mille, Cliff Robertson, Governor James Hunt, President and Mrs. Gerald Ford and Lady Bird Johnson.

The Stevens Center faced difficulty when the federal Economic Development Administration demanded UNCSA pay back $3.12 million because they transferred the title from UNCSA to NCSA, Inc. They also faced trouble with Forsyth County over taxes. In 1990, UNCSA signed a deal to bring preview shows of Broadway Musicals to the Stevens Center but had to end that relationship because the school was losing money on it.

Currently the Stevens Center is occupied with either rehearsals or concerts all but 70 days of the year.

== Specifications ==
- Two levels (Orchestra and Balcony)
- 1,380 seats
- 10 Stories

== Building Usage ==
The building has been used by the following groups for their performances:

- Piedmont Opera
- Piedmont Wind Symphony
- Winston-Salem Symphony
- Something for Everyone Series
- NC Dance Festival
- RiverRun International Film Festival
- American rock band Daughtry shot the music video for their single "September" at the Stevens Center

The building also houses many offices and the UNCSA Community Music School.

=== UNCSA Performances and Groups ===
- The Nutcracker
- UNCSA's All School Musicals, including the fiftieth anniversary production of West Side Story, as well as the 2011 production of Oklahoma!
- UNCSA Symphony Orchestra
- UNCSA Wind Ensemble
- A.J. Fletcher Opera Institute's Winter Opera
- UNCSA School of Dance's Spring Dance
