= David Talbot =

American investigative journalist and editor

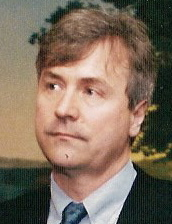
- Talbot in 1998
- Born: September 22, 1951 (age 75); Los Angeles, California, U.S.
- Education: University of California, Santa Cruz
- Occupations: Author, journalist, activist, independent historian
- Spouse: Camille Peri (m. 1989)
- Website: thedavidtalbotshow.com

David Talbot (born September 22, 1951) is an American journalist, author, editor, activist and independent historian. Talbot is known for his books about the "hidden history" of U.S. power and the liberal movements to change America, as well as his public advocacy. He was also the founder and former editor-in-chief of the online magazine Salon.

Talbot founded Salon in 1995. The magazine gained a large following and broke several major national stories.

Since leaving Salon, Talbot has researched and written on the Kennedy assassination and other areas of what he terms 'hidden history'. Talbot has worked as a senior editor for Mother Jones magazine and a features editor for The San Francisco Examiner, and has written for Time magazine, The New Yorker, Rolling Stone and other publications.

In addition to his work as an independent historian, Talbot has been deeply engaged in political activism, especially in his hometown, San Francisco, where he has campaigned for many progressive candidates and has been called "a leader in the fight to keep San Francisco affordable." On his blog, Talbot offers frequent opinions on national and local topics.

== Early life and education ==
Talbot was born and raised in Los Angeles, California. His father was actor Lyle Talbot. He attended the Harvard School for Boys but did not graduate after falling afoul of the school's headmaster and ROTC program during the Vietnam War. He attended the University of California, Santa Cruz.

== Career ==
After graduating, he returned to Los Angeles, where he co-wrote with Barbara Zheutlin a history of the Hollywood Left, Creative Differences: Profiles of Hollywood Dissidents and freelanced for Crawdaddy, Rolling Stone and other magazines. He later was hired by Environmental Action Foundation in Washington, D.C. to write Power and Light, a book about the politics of energy. After he returned to California, he worked as an editor at Mother Jones magazine before San Francisco Examiner publisher Will Hearst hired him to edit the newspaper's Sunday magazine, Image. It was at the Examiner where Talbot developed the idea for Salon, convincing several of his newspaper colleagues to join him.

=== Salon ===
Salon is a web magazine based in San Francisco. Talbot has characterized Salon as aiming to be a "smart tabloid." In 1996, Time magazine picked Salon as the web site of the year. Originally created to cover books and popular culture, the web site became increasingly politicized during the Clinton impeachment drama in the late 1990s. Salon broke from the mainstream press by defending the Clinton presidency and investigating the right-wing prosecutorial apparatus headed by Kenneth Starr and Rep. Henry Hyde, whose own infidelity Salon exposed.

Before stepping down as Salon's CEO and editor-in-chief in 2005, Talbot stabilized the financially rocky web enterprise. Talbot returned briefly as Salon CEO in 2011 but has since left the company.

=== Brothers: The Hidden History of the Kennedy Years ===
After leaving Salon, Talbot resumed his career as an author of popular history books. Talbot's book, The New York Times bestseller, Brothers: The Hidden History of the Kennedy Years, offers a potentially controversial view of the Kennedy presidency and assassination, and explores Bobby Kennedy's search for the truth about his brother's murder. In 2007, Talbot was working on a feature documentary based on Brothers.

=== Devil Dog ===
Talbot's book Devil Dog: The Amazing True Story of the Man Who Saved America chronicles the life and exploits of antiwar U.S. Marine Major General Smedley Darlington Butler. The book, which was part of an illustrated history series called Pulp History, is a collaboration with Zap Comix artist Spain Rodriguez. It focuses on the true story of Major General Smedley Butler, who fought in imperial wars all around the globe as a self-described "gangster for capitalism" before finally returning home where, during the Franklin Delano Roosevelt presidency, he finally got to truly defend democracy. Butler "saved America," in the words of the book, by thwarting an attempted Wall Street coup against FDR. Devil Dog, which was published by Simon & Schuster in fall 2010, won praise from The New York Times, which called the Pulp History series "rip-roaring nonfiction tales with enough purple prose, gory illustrations and va-va-va-voom women to lure in even reluctant teenage male readers".

=== Season of the Witch ===
Talbot's book Season of the Witch: Enchantment, Terror, and Deliverance in the City of Love, about the wild and bloody birth of "San Francisco values", was published in spring 2012. Season of the Witch received starred reviews in Publishers Weekly and Kirkus Reviews, and was described as "enthralling, news-driven history" (San Francisco Chronicle), "energetic, highly entertaining storytelling" (Boston Globe), and "an enthralling – and harrowing – account of how the 1967 Summer of Love gave way to 20 or so winters of discontent" (Washington Post).

=== The Devil's Chessboard ===
Talbot's 2015 book The Devil's Chessboard: Allen Dulles, the CIA, and the Rise of America's Secret Government is a biography examining the career of Allen Dulles. According to Talbot, Dulles orchestrated the assassination of Kennedy at the behest of corporate leaders, who perceived the president to be a threat to national security, lobbied Lyndon B. Johnson to have himself appointed to the Warren Commission, then arranged to have Lee Harvey Oswald take sole responsibility for the act. The book charges that the conspirators in JFK's death also murdered Bobby Kennedy, as they perceived him to be "a wild card, an uncontrollable threat" who would reveal the plot. Talbot was interviewed for the 2021 JFK Revisited: Through the Looking Glass documentary.

The book has stirred debate about the history of the CIA. In a review for the San Francisco Chronicle, Glenn C. Altschuler stated, "Talbot's indictment is long, varied and sensational." Altschuler wrote: "Animated by conspiracy theories, the speculations and accusations in his book often run far ahead of the evidence, even for those of us inclined to believe the worst about Allen Dulles."

Elsewhere, the book has been praised, including by Kirkus Reviews, whose starred review called it "a frightening biography of power, manipulation and outright treason. [...] all engaged American citizens should read this book and have their eyes opened."

=== Between Heaven and Hell: The Story of My Stroke ===
In November 2017, Talbot suffered an ischemic stroke. In January 2020, his book about the stroke and his recovery from it, Between Heaven and Hell: The Story of My Stroke, was published.Author Dave Eggers described the book as, "A deeply affecting examination of mortality, ambition and the priorities of a man who dodged death to live better days."

In June 2024 Talbot, then 72 years old, suffered a second stroke that was nearly fatal. It left him unable to speak.

=== By the Light of Burning Dreams: The Triumphs and Tragedies of the Second American Revolution ===
In his latest book—co-authored with sister Margaret Talbot and brother-in-law Arthur Allen – Talbot examines transformational periods in the lives of radical leaders of the 1960s and '70s. The book, Talbot says, is "my final historical effort at understanding what my generation achieved, and what we failed to accomplish, in attempting to move the country fully toward its better angels."

The book has been widely praised, including as an inspirational guide for a new generation of activists. Jessica Bruder, author of Nomadland: Surviving America in the Twenty-First Century, declared, "By the Light of Burning Dreams crackles with the radical energy of the 1960s and 70s. It's a shot in the arm of bold idealism, an indispensable companion for today's revolutionaries that reminds us what can happen if we dare to believe in – and fight for – a better world." And a critic in Kirkus Reviews celebrated the authors' "sharp reporting and good storytelling…. (They) devote a chapter to each of seven flashpoints of the 1960s and '70s that created 'the second American Revolution.' But an abundance of fresh material gives this book an intergenerational appeal. An intelligent and sympathetic reappraisal of the political upheavals of the '60s and '70s."

== Personal life ==
Talbot is from a media and entertainment family. He is the son of longtime character actor and founding member of the Screen Actors Guild, Lyle Talbot, and brother of PBS documentary producer and former child actor Stephen Talbot, of physician Cynthia Talbot of Portland, Oregon, and of journalist Margaret Talbot, a staff writer at The New Yorker. Talbot was married to writer Camille Peri, co-editor of the national bestseller Mothers Who Think, with whom he has two children. She died in 2026. His son Joe Talbot wrote and directed the 2019 film The Last Black Man in San Francisco.

David Talbot's sister, Margaret, has written a biography of their father, Lyle Talbot, and a memoir of their family life, The Entertainer: Movies, Magic and My Father's Twentieth Century (Riverhead Books, 2012).

In 2024, Talbot suffered his second stroke—this time a "severe stroke" that had him "fighting for his life," according to his family.
