= Arthur Bloom (musician) =

American musician

- Born: Arthur Bloom
- Occupations: Musician and Social Entrepreneur
- Years active: birth-present
- Website: MusiCorps.net

Arthur Bloom is an American composer and pianist, and the founder and director of MusiCorps.

== Career ==
Bloom is a Juilliard- and Yale-trained composer and pianist who works in both classical and popular music. He is the founder and director of Renovation In Music Education (RIME), and MusiCorps.

Bloom created the original "Concert Curriculum," An Orchestra's Guide To The Young Person, a program in which whole grades of students pursue a special curriculum that culminates in their performance with a professional orchestra. Working with NASA, Bloom created An Orchestra's Guide To The Universe, a science version of the Concert Curriculum.

After visiting injured service members at Walter Reed Army Medical Center in 2007, Bloom created MusiCorps to help them in their recovery.

In 2013, Bloom performed with the MusiCorps Band on The Colbert Report. In 2016, he appeared as himself in the 300th episode of NCIS on CBS, which showcased MusiCorps and featured a performance of the MusiCorps Band.

Bloom was selected as a CNN Top 10 Hero of 2014, and a Fox News Power Player of the Week in 2015.

== MusiCorps ==
Bloom is the founder and director of MusiCorps, a conservatory-level music rehabilitation program at Walter Reed National Military Medical Center that helps severely wounded service members play music and recover their lives. Bloom began the program after visiting a soldier at Walter Reed Army Medical Center who played the drums and lost a leg in combat.

Bloom leads the MusiCorps Wounded Warrior Band which is composed of service members who have learned or relearned instruments through MusiCorps, and has performed with Roger Waters, Yo-Yo Ma, Sheryl Crow, Billy Corgan, Tom Morello, Aloe Blacc, Aaron Neville, Oleta Adams, G.E. Smith, Jake Clemons, Dave Kilminster, Ricky Skaggs, and the Kansas City Symphony, among others.
