= Coin Operated =

2017 film soundtrack album

- Film poster
- Directed by: Nicholas Arioli
- Written by: Nicholas Arioli
- Produced by: Jennifer Dahlman
- Edited by: Mark Sorensen
- Music by: Emile Mosseri, Alex Schiff
- Release date: October 3, 2017
- Running time: 5 minutes
- Country: United States

Coin Operated is a 2017 animated short film written and directed by Nicholas Arioli and produced by Jennifer Dahlman. The film premiered at the 2017 Brooklyn Film Festival.

== Summary ==
A young boy sees a rocket kiddie ride at a grocery store. The boy is an aspiring astronaut, and with 5 cents in his pocket, he dispenses the coin and rides it. He is disappointed when the ride does not launch him into space, but instead merely wobbles somewhat for a few seconds.

Expecting that the ride can do better, he opens a lemonade stand and earns money from it. This goes on until the boy has become an old man. Having earned lots of money to produce more launch attempts, he goes back to the ride and fills it with coins. It wobbles like usual at first, but soon shakes violently and launches him into space. A brief shot from the clouds displays him as a young boy again.

== Awards ==
Year	Presenter/Festival	Award/Category	Status
2017	Brooklyn Film Festival	Audience Award	Won
2017	Palm Springs International Festival of Short Films	Crystal Award	Won
2017	AFI Fest	Grand Jury Award for Animated Short	Nominated
