= Adam Mosseri =

American businessman (born 1983)

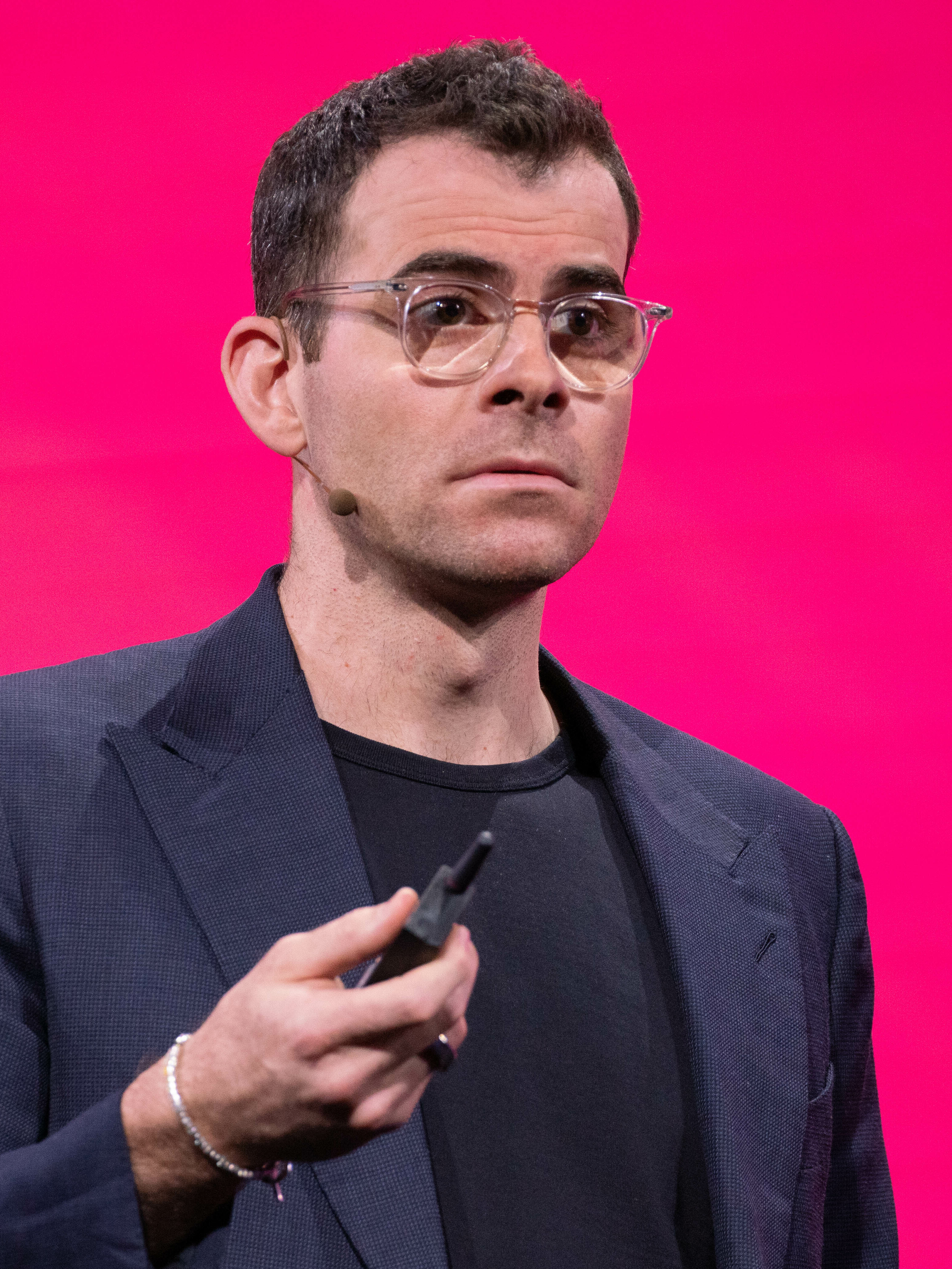
- Mosseri in 2019
- Born: January 23, 1983 (age 43); New York City, U.S.
- Citizenship: United States; Israel
- Education: New York University (BA)
- Occupations: Businessman; Tech Executive; Product Designer
- Years active: 2002–present
- Title: Head of Instagram
- Spouse: Monica Mosseri
- Children: 3
- Relatives: Emile Mosseri (brother)

Adam Mosseri (Hebrew: אדם מוסרי; born January 23, 1983) is an American businessman and the head of Instagram. He formerly was an executive at Facebook, which owns Instagram.

== Early life and education ==
Mosseri was born in New York City to an Egyptian-Israeli Jewish father, a psychotherapist, and an Irish Catholic mother, an architect. He was raised in Chappaqua, New York and went to Horace Greeley High School. He is the older brother of composer Emile Mosseri. He attended New York University's Gallatin School of Individualized Study to study media and information design and graduated with a bachelor's degree in information design in 2005.

== Career ==
In 2003, while studying at NYU, Mosseri started his own design consultancy called Blank Mosseri, which focused on graphic, interaction, and exhibition design. His company had offices in New York and San Francisco. In 2007, he joined TokBox as the company's first designer.

Mosseri joined Facebook as a product designer in 2008. In 2009, Mosseri became a product design manager, and in 2012 became the design director for the company's mobile apps. From 2012 to 2016, Mosseri oversaw Facebook's News Feed section, and from 2016 to May 2018 was vice president of product for Facebook. During his tenure at Facebook, he additionally oversaw Facebook Home, the company's unsuccessful attempt at bringing a mobile homescreen to Android devices.

After the 2016 presidential election, Mosseri took it upon himself to become the spokesperson for Facebook's stance on "fake news." During the 2018 Cambridge Analytica scandal, Mosseri was one of the few Facebook executives who was vocal about Facebook's role in providing security and trustworthy news.

In May 2018, Mosseri was named Instagram's vice president of product. On October 1, 2018, Facebook announced that Mosseri would assume a role as the new head of Instagram, following the resignation of the photo-sharing app's founders Kevin Systrom and Mike Krieger in September 2018. Mosseri's title as head of Instagram differs from the title of former leadership as CEO as Facebook reserves CEO titles for company founders. As company head, Mosseri is expected to hire a new executive team and oversee "all functions of the business".

== Tech industry recognition ==
In 2015, Business Insider recognized Mosseri as a Facebook "Power Player."

In 2017, Mosseri was a keynote speaker at the International Journalism Festival in Perugia, Italy.

In 2018, Mosseri spoke alongside Campbell Brown on behalf of Facebook's news features at Recode's Code Media conference.

In 2020, he was listed in the Tech category of Fortune's '40 Under 40' list.

== Personal life ==
Mosseri used to live in London with his wife, Monica Mosseri and in 2023 returned to California after Meta announced it would transfer or lay off the majority of its London staff. They have three sons. The Mosseri family is active in local philanthropic causes including the Shanti Project. Mosseri has dual U.S. and Israeli citizenship, as his father is Israeli.
