= Alisa Solomon =

American writer and journalist

- Born: 1956 (age 68–69); Chicago, Illinois
- Education: University of Michigan (B.A.); Yale School of Drama (Ph.D.)
- Occupation(s): Professor and Director of the Arts and Culture concentration of Journalism at the Columbia University School of Journalism Writer; Journalist Editor
- Employer: Columbia University School of Journalism
- Notable work: Fiddler: A Miracle of Miracles Wonder of Wonders: A Cultural History of Fiddler on the Roof Re-Dressing the Canon: Essays on Theater and Gender
- Spouse: Marilyn Neimark (married 2012-present)
- Awards: George Jean Nathan Award for Dramatic Criticism Theatre Library Association's George Freedly Memorial Award Kurt Weill Prize
- Website: www.alisasolomon.com

Alisa Solomon, is a writer, Professor of Journalism, and the Director of the Arts and Culture concentration at the Columbia Journalism School. Born in 1956, Solomon served as a story consultant for the documentary on the musical Fiddler on the Roof titled Fiddler: A Miracle of Miracles. Solomon has written two award-winning books: Re-Dressing the Canon: Essays on Theater and Gender and Wonder of Wonders: A Cultural History of Fiddler on the Roof. Additionally, she has served as a reporter for The Village Voice, The New York Times, The Nation, and many other publications.

== Education ==
Solomon earned her BA, with a double major in Drama and Philosophy, at the University of Michigan's Residential College in Ann Arbor, Michigan. She received her MFA and Doctorate, in Dramaturgy and Criticism, at the Yale School of Drama in New Haven, Connecticut.

== Career ==
Solomon first's book, Re-Dressing the Canon: Essays on Theater and Gender, explores gender and performance and was published in 1997. It won the George Jean Nathan Award for Dramatic Criticism. Her second book, Wonder of Wonders: A Cultural History of Fiddler on the Roof, discussed the making of the musical Fiddler on the Roof and shows the evolution of Jewish cultural identity. This book, published in 2013, won the Kurt Weill Prize, the Jewish Journal Prize, and the Theatre Library Association's George Freedley Memorial Award. Solomon has also been an editor of a number of books as well as a special issue of the journal Theater on theatre and social change.

Solomon served as a story consultant for the documentary on the musical Fiddler on the Roof titled Fiddler: A Miracle of Miracles. This documentary goes into the creation and significance of the play, featuring interviews with the Fiddler creators and others from the musical.

Solomon is a teacher at Columbia University's Graduate School of Journalism, and at this university she directs the MA program's Arts & Culture concentration.

Solomon has served as a reporter for the Village Voice from 1983 to 2004, as well as having contributed to: The New York Times newspaper, The Nation newspaper, Tablet newspaper, The Forward newspaper, Howlround.com non-profit service organization, killingthebuddha.com online journal, American Theater magazine, TDR – The Drama Review journal, and others.

Solomon is a member of the leftist anti-racist organization Jews for Racial and Economic Justice (JFREJ).

== Awards ==
In 1997, Solomon won the George Jean Nathan Award for Dramatic Criticism for her book Re-Dressing the Canon: Essays on Theater and Gender. In 2014, she won the Theatre Library Association's George Freedly Memorial Award for her book Wonder of Wonders: A Cultural History of Fiddler on the Roof. In 2015, she won The Kurt Weill Prize for her book Wonder of Wonders: A Cultural History of Fiddler on the Roof.

== Works ==
=== Author ===
- Solomon, Alisa (2013). Wonder of Wonders: A Cultural History of Fiddler on the Roof. New York: Metropolitan Books. ISBN 9780805092608.
  - Won a Theatre Library Association's George Freedly Memorial Award.
  - Won a Kurt Weill Prize.
- Solomon, Alisa (1997). Re-Dressing the Canon: Essays on Theater and Gender. Routledge. ISBN 978-0415157209.
  - Won a George Jean Nathan Award for Dramatic Criticism award.

=== Editor ===
- Solomon et al. (2019). Women Mobilizing Memory, published by the Columbia University Press. ISBN 978-0231191852.
- Solomon et al. (2011). The Reverend Billy Project: From Rehearsal Hall to Super-Mall with the Church of Life After Shopping, published by the University of Michigan Press. ISBN 978-0472051564.
- Solomon et al. (2009). Theater and Social Change, published by Duke University Press Books. ISBN 978-0822365037.
- Solomon, Alisa; Kushner, Tony (2003). Wrestling with Zion: Progressive Jewish-American Responses to the Israeli-Palestinian Conflict, published by the Grove Press. ISBN 978-0802140159.
- Solomon, Alisa; Minwalla, Framji (2002). The Queerest Art: Essays on Lesbian and Gay Theater, published by the New York University Press. ISBN 978-0814798119.
