= Ted Chapin =

Theater producer

- Born: Theodore Steinway Chapin; September 7, 1950 (age 76); New York City, New York
- Occupations: Producer; presenter; performer
- Known for: Acting as president of the Rodgers & Hammerstein Organization
- Notable work: Fiddler: A Miracle of Miracles (2019) Broadway: The American Musical (2004); The Sound of Music: From Fact to Phenomenon (1994); The Smithsonian Salutes Disney Music (1984) Follies (1971)
- Television: Host of American Songbook at NJPAC 2016
- Title: Former President of the Rodgers & Hammerstein Organization
- Term: May 1981 - May 2021
- Parents: Schuyler Chapin (father); Elizabeth Steinway (mother)
- Relatives: Henry Burden Chapin (brother) Miles Chapin (brother) Samuel Garrison Chapin (brother)

Ted Chapin is a producer, performer, presenter, and former president of the Rodgers & Hammerstein Organization. Chapin has led and encouraged many Broadway productions and revivals, some of the most well-known including: "Irving Berlin’s White Christmas,” “Rodgers + Hammerstein’s Cinderella,” “South Pacific” Broadway revival, “The King and I,” “Oklahoma!” and “Carousel.” He also approved many television productions such as “The Sound of Music Live!” on NBC and “Cinderella,” starring Whitney Houston and Brandy, on ABC. Chapin serves on several boards including: American Theatre Wing, Godspeed Musicals, New Music USA, New York City Center, Kurt Weill Foundation for Music, and the Tony Award Administration Committee. He is the co-founder of the Encores! series at New York City Center, and was the producer of the 92nd Street Y’s Lyrics and Lyricists series for two seasons with programs saluting Bobby Darin, Sammy Davis Jr., Irving Berlin, and others. In 2016, Chapin hosted NJTV's American Songbook at NJPAC.

== Career ==
=== President of the Rodgers & Hammerstein Organization ===
Chapin was chosen by the Rodgers and Hammerstein families to run the organization. His job was to manage all of the various copyrights created by Richard Rodgers and/or Oscar Hammerstein II. During his time there, he led many new major Broadway productions, including over twenty award-winning Broadway and London revivals. Some of these Broadway and West End revivals include: "South Pacific", "The King and I", "Oklahoma!", and "Carousel". He also approved many television productions such as “The Sound of Music Live!” on NBC and “Cinderella,” starring Whitney Houston and Brandy, on ABC.

=== Broadway & Television ===
Chapin's start in Broadway production was being a production or directorial assistant in the Broadways productions of Follies, The Rothschilds, and The Unknown Soldier and His Wife, as well as Leonard Bernstein's Mass at the Kennedy Center, and Candide in San Francisco. After becoming president of the Rodgers & Hammerstein Organization, Chapin would lead and encourage many Broadway productions and revivals, including: "Irving Berlin’s White Christmas,” “Rodgers + Hammerstein’s Cinderella,” “South Pacific,” “The King and I,” “State Fair,” “A Grand Night for Singing,” “Holiday Inn” “Oklahoma!” and “Carousel.” He also approved many television productions such as “The Sound of Music Live!” on NBC and “Cinderella,” starring Whitney Houston and Brandy, on ABC. Chapin hosted NJTV's American Songbook at NJPAC in 2016, and moderated many Working in the Theater and Careers in the Theater.

=== Boards & Books ===
Chapin serves on several boards including: The Musical Theater Project, American Theatre Wing, Godspeed Musicals, New Music USA, New York City Center, Kurt Weill Foundation for Music, and the Tony Award Administration Committee. Additionally, Chapin published his book Everything was Possible: The Birth of the Musical Follies in 2005, which discusses his involvement in the popular Broadway production Follies. His book won an ASCAP/Deems Taylor Award and a Special Jury Prize for Distinguished Achievement by the Theatre Library Association.https://www.musicaltheaterproject.org/

=== Encores! ===
Chapin was the co-founder and a chairman of the Advisory Committee of City Center's series Encores! since its beginning.

=== Lecturer ===
Chapin has been a visiting lecturer at several institutions including: Yale University, New York University, Columbia University, Belmont University, Lawrence University, St. Catherine's College in Oxford.

=== Early career ===
Chapin began his career coming out of Connecticut College with more than 5 years of experience working as a production or director's assistant on Broadway shows. His career started with working on the production of shows like Follies, The Rothschilds, The Unknown Soldier and His Wife, and working as an assistant director to director Alan Arkin on Neil Simon's original Broadway production of The Sunshine Boys and the CBS-TV production of George Furth's play Twigs with Carol Burnett.

== Media ==
=== Musicals ===
- (2025). "Just in Time" (Broadway).
- Herzberger et al. (2016). “Holiday Inn” (Broadway), developed by Chris Herzberger.
- Goodman et al. (2013). “Rodgers + Hammerstein’s Cinderella” (Broadway), produced by Robyn Goodman.
- Berlin et al. (2008). "Irving Berlin’s White Christmas" (Broadway Revival), music by Irving Berlin.
- Rodgers et al. (2008). "South Pacific" (Broadway Revival), music by Richard Rodgers and lyrics by Oscar Hammerstein II.
- Rogers et al. (2002). "Oklahoma!" (Third Broadway Revival), music by Richard Rodgers and lyrics by Oscar Hammerstein II.
- Sondheim et al. (2001). Follies (Broadway Revival), music and lyrics by Stephen Sondheim.
- Renshaw et al. (1996). "The King and I" (Third Broadway Revival), directed by Christopher Renshaw.
- Hammerstein et al. (1996). “State Fair” (Broadway), directed by James Hammerstein, music by Richard Rodgers, and lyrics by Oscar Hammerstein II.
- Hytner et al. (1994). "Carousel" (Broadway Revival), directed by Nicholas Hytner.
- Bobbie et al. (1993). “A Grand Night for Singing” (Broadway), directed by Walter Bobbie, music by Richard Rodgers, and lyrics by Oscar Hammerstein II.
- Bernstein et al. (1974). Candide (Broadway Revival), music composed by Leonard Bernstein.
- Morton et al. (1970). The Rothschilds, book by Sherman Yellen, lyrics by Sheldon Harnick and music by Jerry Bock.
- Ustinov et al. (1967). The Unknown Soldier and His Wife, written by Peter Usinov.

=== Television ===
- Chapin hosted NJTV's American Songbook at NJPAC (2016).
- The Sound of Music Live!” on NBC (2013).
- “Cinderella,” starring Whitney Houston and Brandy, on ABC (1997).

=== Books ===
- Everything was Possible: The Birth of the Musical Follies (2005).
  - Won a ASCAP/Deems Taylor Award.
  - Won a Special Jury Prize for Distinguished Achievement by the Theatre Library Association.
