= Jan Lisa Huttner =

American film critic and activist

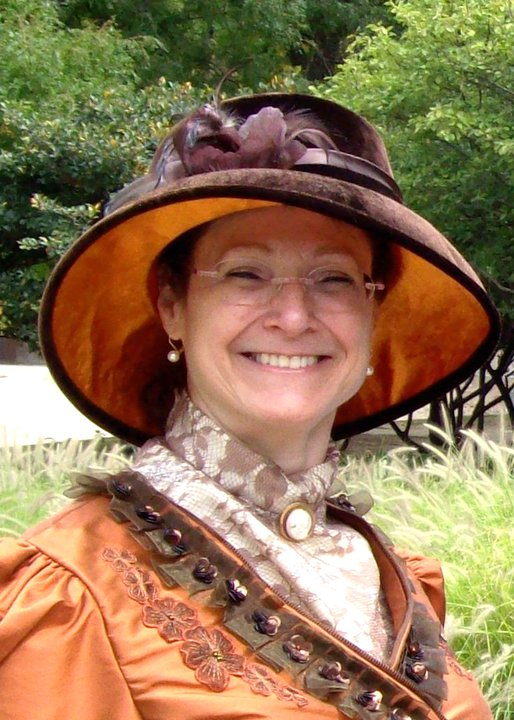
- Huttner in 'Jane Addams' costume, September 2010
- Born: December 10, 1951 (age 74); Newark, New Jersey, USA
- Occupation: Film Critic/Feminist Activist
- Parent: Edwin Huttner Helen Hecht Huttner

Jan Lisa Huttner (born December 10, 1951) is an American film critic, journalist, activist, and independent scholar. Huttner has authored columns for prominent publications, including Women's eNews, the Huffington Post, and The Forward, and is the author of a blog, "The Hot Pink Pen," which is devoted to reviewing films by women filmmakers. She is also known for her work as a proponent of Jane Addams Day, which was officially adopted by the State of Illinois on December 10, 2007. She is one of the founders of International Swan Day.

== Early life ==
Jan Lisa Huttner was born on December 10, 1951, at the Beth Israel Hospital in Newark, New Jersey. Her family moved to Livingston, New Jersey, in 1960, where Huttner completed high school. Huttner completed her undergraduate studies at St. John’s College in 1973, and subsequently earned master's degrees from Harvard University and the University of Chicago. In 1973, Huttner was awarded a grant from the Thomas J. Watson Foundation to study Israeli education administration. Huttner's papers are part of the "Women of U of C" archive at the University of Chicago Library.

== Career ==
=== Consulting ===
Huttner worked as a computer system consultant for nearly 20 years, before starting a career as a film critic and feminist activist in 2002. During her work as a healthcare consultant, Huttner worked for Price Waterhouse Coopers and KPMG.

=== Film Criticism and activism ===
In late 2008, Huttner launched a campaign to recognize Loveleen Tandan as a nominee for Best Director at the 66th Golden Globe Awards. Tandan was credited as "Co-Director: India" on the film Slumdog Millionaire, but the film's Best Director nomination recognized only Danny Boyle as a directing nominee. Huttner launched a campaign to have Tandan recognized, as well. Although Tandan distanced herself from the campaign and claimed she had no interest in sharing the nomination with Danny Boyle, under pressure from the Women's Media Center, she was invited to the Oscars in 2009.

Huttner is the co-creator of SWAN (Support Women Artists Now) Day along with Martha Richards. Swan Day is an annual international celebration of women’s creativity and gender parity activism that began in 2008.

In late 2011, Huttner published her first book, Penny’s Picks: 50 Films by Women Filmmakers 2002-2011. The book, which is a compilation of Huttner’s reviews from various publications, focuses on films that involved female screenwriters and directors.

=== Fiddler on the Roof scholarship ===
In September 2014, Huttner published a second book, Tevye's Daughters: No Laughing Matter, to honor the 50th anniversary of Fiddler on the Roof's Broadway debut. In the book, Huttner discusses the "synergies” that account for Fiddler on the Roof's popularity and argues that the musical's creators were participants in a great conversation about women’s rights.

In late 2016, Huttner published her third book, Diamond Fiddler: Laden with Happiness & Tears.

Huttner served as a story consultant and talking head in the 2019 documentary feature film, Fiddler: A Miracle of Miracles.

== Role in Jane Addams Day ==
Huttner supported the effort to recognize Jane Addams with an official holiday. The Illinois chapter of the AAUW also supported the effort and encouraged students to lobby for the holiday to be officially recognized by the state. In May 2006, Governor Rod Blagojevich signed legislation officially declaring December 10 to be “Jane Addams Day.” Addams was one of the first women to have a commemorative day in the entire United States.

Huttner also successfully campaigned for the Louise Bourgeois’ commemorative Addams sculpture series “Helping Hands” to be removed from storage. A recreation of the sculpture series is on display near the Clarke House Museum.

== Recognition and awards ==
Huttner has received Silver Feather Awards on three separate occasions from the Illinois Woman's Press Association. In 2005, she also received a first place certificate for "Best News Writing for the Web" from the National Federation of Press Women. In 2012, Huttner was named the AAUW-IL Agent of Change at the State Convention luncheon on Saturday, April 28.
