= The Dig (band) =

American rock band

- Origin: New York City, United States
- Genres: Rock, psychedelic pop, baroque pop, alternative rock, indie rock
- Years active: 2010–2018
- Label: Buffalo Jump Records
- Members: David Baldwin; Emile Mosseri; Erick Eiser; Mark Demiglio
- Past members: Jamie Alegre
- Website: thedigmusic.com

The Dig is an American rock band based in New York City, consisting of Emile Mosseri (bass/vocals), David Baldwin (guitar/vocals), Erick Eiser (keyboards/guitar), and Mark Demiglio (drums).

The band released its debut, self released album Quiet Parade in 2006, followed by their first of five EPs, Good Luck and Games in 2007. They later released Midnight Flowers in 2012, and two EPs, Tired Hearts and You & I in 2013 all under the label Buffalo Jump. Finally, in 2017 they released their last album, Bloodshot Tokyo and in 2018 they released their final two EPs, Moonlight Baby/Afternoon with Caroline.

== History ==
The Dig's singers Emile Mosseri and David Baldwin started playing in a band together when they were 10 years old, performing under the name "Honey Nut Roasted" when they were in high school together. The band used to rehearse next door to The Strokes, which led to early comparisons between the two bands.

Since releasing their debut album, they have toured or performed with such bands as The Lumineers, The Antlers, The Walkmen, Portugal. The Man, and Editors.

=== Electric Toys (2010) ===
In 2010, the band released their debut album, Electric Toys, which was produced by Bryce Goggin who has worked with Pavement, Ramones and Swans. As explained by Mosseri in an interview with UK/US music Web site There Goes the Fear, the album title is a reference to a lyric in the song "She's Going to Kill That Boy" and suggests that the album is a collection of electric toys. rockandrollreport.com described the album by stating, "Overall, this album does not sound like a debut, and I am sure that it is just the start of what this incredible band can record."

=== Midnight Flowers (2012) ===
In 2012, the band released Midnight Flowers, with theowlmag.com describing its features as "eerie post-punk riffs, strident bass lines, and meditative melodies" It was well received, earning a 3.5-star rating from Consequence of Sound. bangstyle.com also praised the album: "Midnight Flowers is a 10-track gem, filled with grimy guitar riffs and spaced-out melodies that echo the vibe of their native city. The album is big and booming with enough power to put them on the main stage next to the indie greats that they’ve opened for in the past."

=== Tired Hearts and You & I (2013) ===
In June 2013, the band released their first EP, "Tired Hearts." According to Consequence of Sound "It’s a The Cure-meets-T. Rex sound that utilizes dark keyboards, with enough reverb to drown Robert Smith...“Without Your Love” sounds like surf rock written by Joy Division, layered with thick reverb and football fields of echo."

A second EP entitled You & I was released in October, 2013. The EP's first track "Cold Afternoon" was featured in the popular TV show Shameless on March 9, 2014.

=== Regrouping as Human Love ===
On May 13, 2020, The Dig announced that they would no longer be making music under that name, but were regrouping to form a new band called Human Love, which they stated would be "all about collaboration and collective energy". They have since released an EP titled "Black Void".

== Discography ==
- 2006: Quiet Parade
- 2007: Good Luck and Games - EP
- 2010: Electric Toys
- 2012: Midnight Flowers
- 2013: Tired Hearts - EP
- 2013: You & I - EP
- 2017: Bloodshot Tokyo
- 2018: Moonlight Baby - EP & Afternoon with Caroline - EP
