= Fiddler: A Miracle of Miracles =

2019 documentary film

- Film poster
- Directed by: Max Lewkowicz
- Written by: Max Lewkowicz; Valerie Thomas
- Produced by: Max Lewkowicz; Valerie Thomas; Patti Kerner; Rita Lerner; Ann Oster; Elena Berger-Melman; Christopher Massimine
- Cinematography: Scott Shelley
- Edited by: Joseph Borruso
- Production company: Dog Green Productions
- Distributed by: Roadside Attractions; Samuel Goldwyn Films
- Release dates: July 18, 2019 (San Francisco Jewish Film Festival); August 23, 2019 (United States)
- Running time: 97 minutes
- Country: United States
- Language: English
- Box office: $558,816

Fiddler: A Miracle of Miracles is a 2019 American documentary film about the creation and significance of the 1964 musical Fiddler on the Roof. Directed by Max Lewkowicz, it features interviews with Fiddler creators such as Jerry Bock, Sheldon Harnick, Joseph Stein, and Harold Prince, as well as scholars, actors, and other musical theatre figures such as Stephen Sondheim and Lin-Manuel Miranda. The documentary includes rarely-seen footage of the original Broadway cast as well as interviews with creators, actors, theatrical figures, and scholars.

This film is dedicated to the memory of Harold Prince, who died during production.

== Synopsis ==
Through the presentation of first-hand accounts, archival footage, and analysis by scholars and prominent musical theater figures, Fiddler: A Miracle of Miracles explores the creative process and cultural significance of the Broadway musical Fiddler on the Roof. First-hand accounts chronicle the personalities of the original Broadway cast and creators. Scholars examine the play's themes of xenophobia, gender equality, civil rights, and religion. These themes are used to contextualize the musical and its cultural impact within the lens of 1960s New York. Jewish actors discuss the play's impact on their identity. Interviews with productions from around the world demonstrate the universal appeal and international legacy of the play.

== Creative team ==
- Max Lewkowicz - Director/Screenplay
- Valerie Thomas - Screenplay
- Tess Martin - Animation
- Joseph Borruso - Editor
- Jan Lisa Huttner - Story consultant
- Alisa Solomon - Story consultant

== Interviewees ==
=== Creators ===
- Harold Prince - producer of the original show
- Jerry Bock - composer
- Joseph Stein - book writer
- Sheldon Harnick - lyricist

=== Family ===
- Harry Stein - son of Joseph Stein
- Josh Mostel - son of Zero Mostel, the original Tevye
- Marc Aronson - son of Boris Aronson, the original set designer
- Michael Bernardi - son of Tevye replacement Herschel Bernardi, understudied Tevye in the 2015 Broadway revival

=== Original cast (1964) ===
- Austin Pendleton - the original Motel
- Joanna Merlin - the original Tzeitel

=== Film adaptation (1971) ===
- Topol - portrayed Tevye in the West End and in the film
- Norman Jewison - director of the film
- Rosalind Harris - portrayed Tzeitel in the film
- Neva Small - portrayed Chava in the film

=== Broadway revival (2004) ===
- Harvey Fierstein - Tevye replacement in the 2004 Broadway revival

=== Broadway revival (2015) ===
- Adam Kantor - portrayed Motel in the 2015 Broadway revival
- Alexandra Silber - portrayed Tzeitel in the 2015 Broadway revival
- Bartlett Sher - director of the 2015 Broadway revival
- Danny Burstein - portrayed Tevye in the 2015 Broadway revival
- Jessica Hecht - portrayed Golde in the 2015 Broadway revival
- Kelly Hall-Tompkins - concertmistress/soloist of the 2015 Broadway revival
- Melanie Moore - portrayed Chava in the 2015 Broadway revival
- Ted Sperling - music director/conductor of the 2015 Broadway revival

=== Yiddish production (2018) ===
- Joel Grey - director of the 2018 Yiddish production
- Steven Skybell - portrayed Tevye in the 2018 Yiddish production

=== Additional contributors ===
- Alisa Solomon - author of Wonder of Wonders: A Cultural History of Fiddler on the Roof
- Amanda Vaill - author of Somewhere: The Life of Jerome Robbins
- Charles Isherwood - New York Times Theater Critic
- Fran Leibowitz - Manhattan Raconteur
- Gurinder Chadha - director of Bend it Like Beckham
- Jan Lisa Huttner - author of Diamond Fiddler: New Traditions for a New Millennium
- Jeremy Dauber - author of The Worlds of Sholem Aleichem: The Remarkable Life and Afterlife of the Man Who Created Tevye
- Lin-Manuel Miranda - creator of In The Heights and Hamilton (musical)
- Stephen Sondheim - American composer and lyricist
- Nathan Englander - author of The Ministry of Special Cases
- Ted Chapin - author of Everything Was Possible: The Birth of the Musical Follies

== Reception ==
Fiddler: A Miracle of Miracles received critical acclaim. On the review aggregator website Rotten Tomatoes, 98% of 47 critics' reviews are positive. The website's consensus reads: "Fiddler: A Miracle of Miracles takes a delightfully engaging look at the history of a beloved musical and its deep cultural impact." Metacritic, which uses a weighted average, assigned the film a score of 80 out of 100, based on 11 critics, indicating "generally favorable" reviews.

Peter Travers, reviewing the film for Rolling Stone, gave it a rating of four out of five stars and called it "essential viewing". In a review for The New York Times, Jason Zinoman praised the film's ability to portray the early days of Fiddler's composition, but noted that it avoids "any serious grappling with criticism of the show".
