= Wounded Warrior Band =

- Origin: MusiCorps at Walter Reed National Military Medical Center
- Genres: Progressive rock, R&B, art rock, Pop music
- Members: Tim Donley (lead singer); Josh Cawthorn (rhythm guitar); Nathan Kalwicki (lead guitar); Will Cook (guitar); Marcus Dandrea (bass, vocals); Greg Loman (mentor, guitarist, vocals); Nate Jakubisin (percussion); Arthur Bloom (mentor, keys, director)
- Website: musicorps.net/Band

The MusiCorps Wounded Warrior Band is a component of the MusiCorps program at Walter Reed National Military Medical Center. It comprises service members who have become musicians through the MusiCorps program training.

== Members and organization ==
The Wounded Warrior Band recruits wounded veterans who have learned or relearned how to play their instruments through the MusiCorps program's training. Instruments include guitar, bass, keyboard, voice, and drums.

== Performances ==
- Stand Up for Heroes 2012 and 2013. Roger Waters, G.E. Smith, and Dave Kilminster played with the MusiCorps Wounded Warrior Band at this benefit for the Bob Woodruff Foundation. Soon after the performance, this benefit in 2013 raised over five million dollars.
- Americans for the Arts. Yo-Yo Ma invited MusiCorps to perform with him at the Kennedy Center for Arts Advocacy Day.
- Celebration At The Station 2013. The band performed with Oleta Adams and the Kansas City Symphony in front of 55,000 people.
- Comedy Central's The Colbert Report. The MusiCorps Wounded Warrior Band performed with Aaron Neville and Stephen Colbert during the show's Christmas Carol Week.
- Grand Ole Opry. The MusiCorps Wounded Warrior Band made its Grand Ole Opry debut on May 20, 2014.

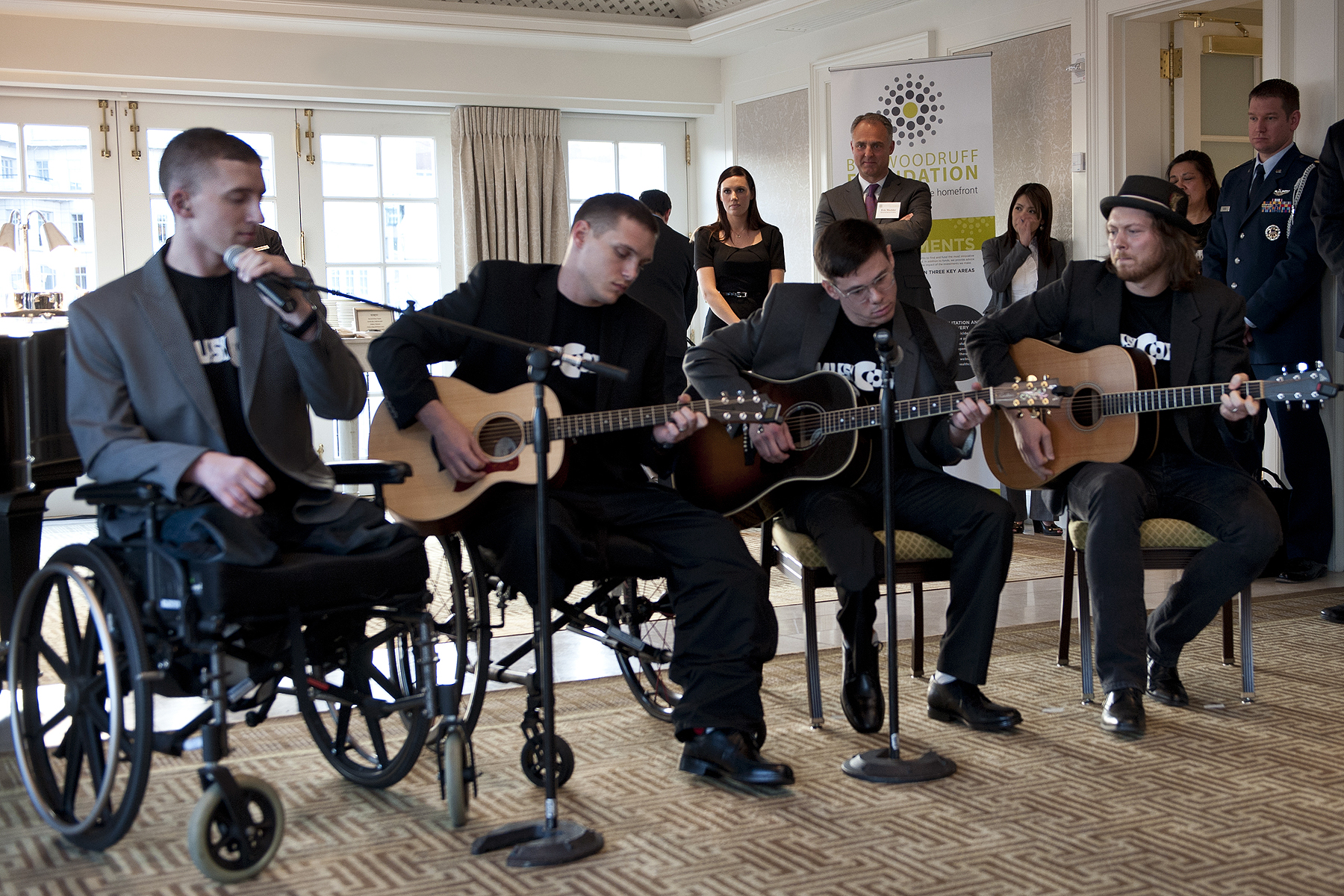
