= Toronto Jewish Film Festival =

Toronto Jewish Film Festival (TJFF)
- Location: Toronto, Ontario, Canada
- Founded: 1993
- No. of films: 27 (as of 2019)
- Language: International
- Website: https://tjff.com/

The Toronto Jewish Film Festival (TJFF) is an annual film festival held in Toronto, Ontario, Canada. It is described as the largest Jewish film festival in the world.

The festival was founded in 1993. One of its founders, Helen Zukerman, is the festival's artistic director. The festival's board of directors is chaired by Allison Martin.

The 2014 festival ran from May 1 to May 11 and featured 116 films from 23 countries. The 2019 festival, the 27th, was from May 2 to May 12, 2019. The 2020 festival took place online. The 2021 festival is scheduled to run from June 3 to June 13.

== See also ==
- Toronto International Film Festival
- Toronto Student Film Festival
