= Imagem =

Dutch music publishing company

- Predecessor: Zomba Music Publishing
- Founded: 2008
- Successor: Concord Music Publishing
- Country of origin: Netherlands
- Headquarters location: Hilversum
- Key people: André de Raaff; Denis Wigman
- Owners: Stichting Pensioenfonds ABP; CTM Entertainment
- Official website: www.imagem.com

Imagem Music Group was a Dutch music publisher. The company was founded in 2008 by the Dutch firm Stichting Pensioenfonds ABP, one of the world's largest pension funds, in conjunction with the independent publisher and media company CP Masters BV. It began by acquiring European music publishing rights in a number of catalogues sold by Universal Music Publishing Group after its acquisition of BMG Music Publishing, such as Rondor UK, Zomba UK, 19 Music, 19 Songs, & the BBC catalog; the sale was worth 140 million euros (US$221.5 million). These were sold by Universal after the European Commission ordered the sell-off as a condition of its merger with BMG's publishing arm. This was followed by acquiring the world's leading classical music publishing company Boosey & Hawkes in 2008 and Rodgers & Hammerstein Organization in 2009.

On June 2, 2017, Concord announced that it would acquire Imagem for $500 million. The deal included 250,000 compositions, and tripled Concord's number of publishing copyrights. With the acquisition, Concord merged Imagem with The Bicycle Music Company to form Concord Music Publishing.

Highlights from Imagem's pop catalogue included Nik Kershaw, Phil Collins, Genesis, The Temper Trap, M.I.A., Pink Floyd, Vampire Weekend, Dire Straits and Daft Punk; as well as some European rights to Linkin Park and Justin Timberlake. Imagem had offices in the Netherlands, London, New York, Los Angeles and Berlin.

== Boosey and Hawkes ==
Boosey & Hawkes was sold to Imagem in April 2008 for £126m by its private equity owner, HgCapital. The sale was one of the world's largest of classical music. Hg Capital took Boosey & Hawkes off the stock exchange in 2003 for £75m. Under its ownership, the group made six acquisitions in new areas like jazz and tango. Revenues from supplying music for advertising and film were increased, and printing and distribution outsourced.

== Rodgers and Hammerstein ==
In 2009, the estates of Richard Rodgers and Oscar Hammerstein II sold the rights to songs and musicals, including South Pacific, The Sound of Music and Oklahoma!, to Imagem Music Group. The sale transferred power over one of America's most famous song catalogs and the licensing rights for future productions of the musicals, which had been controlled by the Rodgers & Hammerstein Organization, a Manhattan-based company. As part of the deal, Imagem acquired the Rodgers & Hammerstein Organization and retained its management.
