= Joe Talbot (filmmaker) =

American filmmaker (born 1990)

- Talbot in 2020
- Born: Joseph Lyle Talbot; July 11, 1990 (age 36); San Francisco, California, U.S.
- Occupation: Filmmaker
- Years active: 2017–present
- Notable work: The Last Black Man in San Francisco
- Parent: David Talbot
- Relatives: Nat Talbot (brother); Lyle Talbot (grandfather); Margaret Talbot (aunt)
- Website: longshotfeatures.com; technicolortalbot.com

Joseph Lyle Talbot (born July 11, 1990) is an American filmmaker. His debut feature film, The Last Black Man in San Francisco (2019), which he co-wrote and directed, won the Best Director prize at the 2019 Sundance Film Festival. The film is loosely based on the life of his childhood best friend, Jimmie Fails.

== Early life ==
Talbot grew up around Precita Park in Bernal Heights, near the Mission District in San Francisco. His father is the journalist David Talbot, his grandfather was the actor Lyle Talbot, and his aunt is New Yorker columnist Margaret Talbot. He and his younger brother, Nat Talbot, attended Ruth Asawa San Francisco School of the Arts, although Joe later dropped out. He met Jimmie Fails at a neighborhood park and they became close friends. Last Stop Livermore, a short film he made with Fails and Nat in high school, was a finalist in the Golden Gate Award.

== Career ==
=== Short films ===
Talbot's debut film was the 2017 short film American Paradise, which he wrote, produced, and edited. It premiered at the 2017 Sundance Film Festival while nominated for the Short Film Grand Jury Prize and the Short Film Jury Award. American Paradise won the Best U.S. Short at the 2017 Nashville Film Festival.

=== Longshot Features and Last Black Man in San Francisco ===
In 2019, Talbot formed a production company called Longshot Features with Fails. Like American Paradise, The Last Black Man in San Francisco premiered at the 2019 Sundance Film Festival where Talbot won the best director at the festival and went on to win nine awards throughout the US Film Festivals.

The film earned Talbot the Directors Guild Award nomination in the first-time feature filmmaker category, an Independent Spirit Award nomination for best first feature, and three Gotham Award nominations; best screenplay, the Bingham Ray Breakthrough Director Award and the audience award. It earned $4.6 million on a budget of $2 million. Critics from the Miami New Times stated that this film is "an ode to San Francisco, which is rapidly shifting due to development and gentrification."

=== Music video and Governessess ===
Talbot directed the music video for Adele's "I Drink Wine", which was released in October 2022. The video has a "fantastically surreal lazy river landscape in which Adele floats along on an inner tube. While she sips rose, she's courted by a shirtless fisherman" who is played by Kendrick Sampson. According to Adele, she reached out to Talbot about directing after seeing his feature film.

A24 greenlit his sophomore project, The Governesses, in 2022, with Talbot set to direct. Lead actors included Lily-Rose Depp, HoYeon Jung, and Renate Reinsve. The screenplay is by Talbot and Olivia Gatwood. The film is based on the novel Les Gouvernantes by French author Anne Serre. With production taking place in Spain, BBC Film co-financed the project.

== Filmography ==
Short film

Year	Title	Director	Writer	Producer	Editor
2017	American Paradise	Yes	Yes	Yes	Yes

Feature film

Year	Title	Director	Writer	Producer
2019	The Last Black Man in San Francisco	Yes	Yes	Yes
TBA	The Governesses	Yes	Yes	No

Music video

- "I Drink Wine" by Adele (2021)
- "My Greedy Heart" by Emile Mosseri (2023)
