= Emile Mosseri =

American musician

- Born: New York City, New York, U.S.
- Occupations: Composer; musician; songwriter
- Years active: 2003–present
- Relatives: Adam Mosseri (brother)
- Musical career
- Genres: Film score, classical music, indie rock
- Website: emilemosseri.com

Emile Mosseri is an American composer, pianist, singer and producer based in Los Angeles.

== Early life and education ==
Mosseri was born in New York City to an Egyptian-Israeli Jewish father, a psychotherapist, and an Irish Catholic mother, an architect. He was raised in the suburb of Chappaqua, New York and is the younger brother of Adam Mosseri.

He studied film scoring at Berklee College of Music.

== Career ==
Mosseri has scored films including The Last Black Man in San Francisco (2019), Minari (2020), and Kajillionaire (2020), and composed for television shows like HBO's Random Acts of Flyness, and season 2 of Amazon's Homecoming. He received an Academy Award nomination for Best Original Score for Minari. Mosseri is a member of the indie-rock band The Dig, as well as a recording artist and touring musician.

== Filmography ==
Year	Title	Director	Notes
2016	How to Tell You're a Douchebag	Tahir Jetter	
2017	Coin Operated	Nicholas Arioli	
2018	Random Acts of Flyness (HBO)	Terence Nance	
2019	The Last Black Man in San Francisco	Joe Talbot	
2020	Homecoming (Season 2) (Amazon)	Kyle Patrick Alvarez	
2020	Kajillionaire	Miranda July	
2020	Minari	Lee Isaac Chung	
2022	When You Finish Saving the World	Jesse Eisenberg	
2022	Stutz	Jonah Hill	
2025	Preparation for the Next Life	Bing Liu	
2026	How to Make a Killing	John Patton Ford	
2026	The Debut	Jesse Eisenberg	
TBA	Cut Off	Jonah Hill	
