= List of The Hunger Games characters =

The following is a list of characters in The Hunger Games novels, a series of young adult science fiction novels by Suzanne Collins whose original trilogy was later adapted into a series of feature films.

== Overview ==
List indicators

This section includes characters who have appeared in the film series.

- An empty grey cell indicates the character was not in the film.
- ^{A} indicates an appearance through archival footage or audio.

Character	Films					
Character	The Hunger Games	Catching Fire	Mockingjay – Part 1	Mockingjay – Part 2	The Ballad of Songbirds & Snakes	Sunrise on the Reaping
Character	2012	2013	2014	2015	2023	2026
=== Principal characters ===
Coriolanus Snow	Donald Sutherland	Donald Sutherland	Donald Sutherland	Donald Sutherland	Tom Blyth Dexter Sol Ansell^{Y} Donald Sutherland ^{A}^{V}^{C}	Ralph Fiennes
Katniss Everdeen	Jennifer Lawrence	Jennifer Lawrence	Jennifer Lawrence	Jennifer Lawrence		Jennifer Lawrence
Peeta Mellark	Josh Hutcherson	Josh Hutcherson	Josh Hutcherson	Josh Hutcherson		Josh Hutcherson
Haymitch Abernathy	Woody Harrelson	Woody Harrelson	Woody Harrelson	Woody Harrelson		Joseph Zada Woody Harrelson
Effie Trinket	Elizabeth Banks	Elizabeth Banks	Elizabeth Banks	Elizabeth Banks		Elle Fanning
Gale Hawthorne	Liam Hemsworth	Liam Hemsworth	Liam Hemsworth	Liam Hemsworth		
Primrose "Prim" Everdeen	Willow Shields	Willow Shields	Willow Shields	Willow Shields		
Cinna	Lenny Kravitz	Lenny Kravitz				
Tigris Snow				Eugenie Bondurant	Hunter Schafer	
Lucy Gray Baird					Rachel Zegler	
Sejanus Plinth					Josh Andrés Rivera	
Lenore Dove Baird						Whitney Peak
Maysilee Donner						Mckenna Grace
Wyatt Callow						Ben Wang
Louella McCoy						Molly McCann
Lou Lou						Iona Bell
=== Capitol citizens ===
Caesar Flickerman	Stanley Tucci	Stanley Tucci	Stanley Tucci	Stanley Tucci		Kieran Culkin
Seneca Crane	Wes Bentley					
Claudius Templesmith	Toby Jones	Toby Jones				
Octavia	Bruce Bundy	Bruce Bundy				
Flavius	Nelson Ascencio	Nelson Ascencio				
Portia	Latarsha Rose					
Venia	Kimiko Gelman					
Atala	Karan Kendrick					
Lavinia	Amber Chaney					
Plutarch Heavensbee		Philip Seymour Hoffman	Philip Seymour Hoffman	Philip Seymour Hoffman		Jesse Plemons
President Snow's granddaughter		Erika Bierman	Erika Bierman			
Antonius			Robert Knepper	Robert Knepper		
Egeria			Sarita Choudhury	Sarita Choudhury		
Dr. Volumnia Gaul					Viola Davis	
Casca Highbottom					Peter Dinklage	
Lucretius "Lucky" Flickerman					Jason Schwartzman	
Grandma'am					Fionnula Flanagan	
Clemensia Dovecote					Ashley Liao	
Festus Creed					Max Raphael	
Lysistrata Vickers					Zoe Renee	
Felix Ravinstill					Aamer Husain	
Arachne Crane					Lilly Cooper	
Drusilla Sickle						Glenn Close
Magno Stift						Billy Porter
Proserpina Trinket						Iris Apatow
Vitus						Edvin Ryding
Tibby						Jax Gerrero
Hersilia						Sandra Förster
=== District 12 residents ===
Asterid Everdeen	Paula Malcomson	Paula Malcomson	Paula Malcomson	Paula Malcomson		Grace Ackary
Burdock Everdeen	Philip Troy Linger			Philip Troy Linger		Scot Greenan
Mrs. Mellark	Raiko Bowman					
Greasy Sae	Sandra Ellis Lafferty	Sandra Ellis Lafferty				
Romulus Thread		Patrick St. Esprit				
Cray		Wilbur Fitzgerald				
Ripper		Taylor St. Clair				
Tam Amber					Eike Onyambu	TBA
Clerk Carmine					Konstantin Taffet	Jeffery Hallman
Billy Taupe Clade					Dakota Shapiro	
Mayfair Lipp					Isobel Jesper	
Spruce					George Somner	
Maude Ivory					Vaughan Reilly	
Willamae Abernathy						Kara Tointon
Sid Abernathy						Smylie Bradwell
Merrilee Donner						Mckenna Grace
Hattie Meeney						Melody Chikakane Brown
Mr McCoy						Jefferson White
Blair						Devon Singletary
=== Tributes (74th Hunger Games) ===
Marvel	Jack Quaid	Jack Quaid				
Thresh	Dayo Okeniyi	Dayo Okeniyi^{A}				
Rue	Amandla Stenberg	Amandla Stenberg^{A}				
Glimmer	Leven Rambin					
Cato	Alexander Ludwig					
Clove	Isabelle Fuhrman					
Foxface	Jacqueline Emerson					
Tribute Boy District 3	Ian Nelson					
Tribute Girl District 3	Kalia Prescott					
Tribute Boy District 4	Ethan Jamieson					
Tribute Girl District 4	Tara Macken					
Tribute Boy District 5	Chris Mark					
Tribute Boy District 6	Ashton Moio					
Tribute Girl District 6	Kara Petersen					
Tribute Boy District 7	Sam Ly					
Tribute Girl District 7	Leigha Hancock					
Tribute Boy District 8	Samuel Tan					
Tribute Girl District 8	Mackenzie Lintz					
Tribute Boy District 9	Imanol Yepez-Frias					
Tribute Girl District 9	Annie Thurman					
Tribute Boy District 10	Jeremy Marinas					
Tribute Girl District 10	Dakota Hood					
=== Tributes (75th Hunger Games) ===
Beetee Latier		Jeffrey Wright	Jeffrey Wright	Jeffrey Wright		Kelvin Harrison Jr.
Finnick Odair		Sam Claflin	Sam Claflin	Sam Claflin		
Johanna Mason		Jena Malone	Jena Malone	Jena Malone		
Enobaria		Meta Golding		Meta Golding		
Mags Flanagan		Lynn Cohen				Lili Taylor
Wiress		Amanda Plummer				Maya Hawke
Gloss		Alan Ritchson				
Cashmere		Stephanie Leigh Schlund				
Brutus		Bruno Gunn				
Female Morphling		Megan Hayes				
Male Morphling		Justin Hix				
Blight		Bobby Jordan				
Cecelia		Elena Sanchez				
Woof		John Casino				
Seeder		Maria Howell				
Chaff		E. Roger Mitchell				
=== District 13 residents ===
President Alma Coin			Julianne Moore	Julianne Moore		
Boggs			Mahershala Ali	Mahershala Ali		
Cressida			Natalie Dormer	Natalie Dormer		
Messalla			Evan Ross	Evan Ross		
Castor			Wes Chatham	Wes Chatham		
Pollux			Elden Henson	Elden Henson		
Jackson				Michelle Forbes		
Homes				Omid Abtahi		
Mitchell				Joe Chrest		
Leeg 1				Misty Ormiston		
Leeg 2				Kim Ormiston		
Dr. Aurelius				April Grace		
=== Tributes (10th Hunger Games) ===
Facet					Tim Torok	
Velvereen					Vara Kane	
Marcus					Jerome Lance	
Sabyn					Yuli Lam	
Circ					Felix Audu	
Teslee					Vanessa Blanck	
Mizzen					Cooper Dillon	
Coral					Mackenzie Lansing	
Hy					Kittipong Ace Cunjanagan	
Sol					Samia Hofmann	
Otto					Nova Just	
Ginnee					Kyra Reinert	
Treech					Hiroki Berrecloth	
Lamina					Irene Boehm	
Bobbin					Knox Gibson	
Wovey					Sofia Sanchez	
Panlo					Lucas Wilson	
Sheaf					Jona Marie Maux	
Tanner					Kjell Brutscheidt	
Brandy					Luna Kuse	
Reaper Ash					Dimitri Abold	
Dill					Luna Steeples	
Jessup Diggs					Nick Benson	
=== Tributes (50th Hunger Games) ===
Panache Barker						Jhaleil Swaby
Loupe						Jamal Samalone
Silka Sharp						Laura Marcus
Carat						Nikita Takasaki
Alpheus						Julius Trabolt
Janus						Michael Schweisser
Camilla						Paloma Padrock
Nona						Elizabeth Heinz
Ampert Latier						Percy Daggs IV
Lect						Zahel Anwary
Dio						Annika Schnauffer
Coil						Sophie Paasch
Urchin						Emil Bloch
Angler						Dias Kaldybeck
Maritte						Sky Frances
Barba						Anastasia Detkov
Hychel						Seedy Touray
Fisser						Christian Camillo Engel
Anion						Padme Hamdemir
Potena						Jelle Flora Pouwells
Miles						Tristan Friedrichs
Atread						Deyar Alkalash
Wellie						Rada Rae
Velo						Elizabeth Churcher
Bircher						Illja Bultmann
Heartwood						Thiện Phước Nguyễn
Autumn						Madeline Wagenitz
Ringina						Tatyana Muzondo
Wefton						Vincent Schwalm
Ripman						Victor Bass
Notion						Anna-Lena Treue
Alawna						Carmen Guissou
Ryan						Luis Santiago Klier
Clayton						Salimou Thiam
Kerna						Alina Reid
Midge						Luise Forberg
Buck						John Doeble
Stamp						Jack Lee Thomas
Lannie						Madouna Said
Peeler						Lisa Lekutat
Hull						Kain Buffonge
Tile						Shahriar Sadeghian
Chicory						Berline Augustin
Blossom						Suryani Hardt
Woodbine Chance						Serafin Mishiev
=== Residents of other districts ===
Annie Cresta		Stef Dawson	Stef Dawson	Stef Dawson		
District 11 Mayor		Afemo Omilami				
Old Man in District 11		Leon Lamar				
Rue's Aunt		Kimberley Drummond				
District 4 Flower Girl		Mandy Neuhaus				
Commander Paylor			Patina Miller	Patina Miller		
Eddy			Michael Garza			
Commander Lyme				Gwendoline Christie		
District 4 Officiant				Mark Jeffrey Miller		
District 5 Commander				Desmond Phillips		

== Main characters ==
=== Katniss Everdeen ===
Katniss Everdeen, also known as "the girl on fire," is the main protagonist of The Hunger Games. She is 16 years old at the beginning of the first book and is quiet, independent, and fierce. She has long dark hair (usually tied up in a braid), olive skin, and gray eyes, which are given as a characteristic of residents of the coal mining region of District 12 known as "the Seam." She was named for an aquatic plant with edible underwater tubers by her father, who jokingly said that “If you can find yourself, you'll never be hungry.” She lives with her mother and younger sister, Primrose (nicknamed "Prim"). Her father's death in a mining accident several years ago left her mother deeply depressed, forcing Katniss to become the parental figure and to use the hunting skills taught by her father to feed the family. Her favorite color is green, (as she told Peeta when he offered friendship to her) because of her familiarity with the forest. When Prim is reaped as a tribute who must fight twenty-three other tributes to the death in the 74th Hunger Games, Katniss volunteers to replace her. Katniss survives the game along with fellow tribute Peeta Mellark, who is in love with her. In the 74th Hunger Games, Katniss kills several tributes such as Glimmer, whom she indirectly kills with the tracker jacker nest; a District Four girl [book only], whom she indirectly kills with the tracker jacker nest; Marvel, whom she kills with an arrow after he kills Rue, and Cato, whom she kills as he is being eaten by the muttations to put him out of his misery. To survive, Katniss "pretends" she loves Peeta. When the Gamemakers renege on a promise to let two surviving tributes from the same district live, she defies and embarrasses the government by threatening a double suicide with Peeta, personally antagonizing Panem's leader, President Coriolanus Snow.

In the second installment, Catching Fire, she is forced to fight in the next year's Hunger Games, an especially brutal edition known as the Quarter Quell which occurs every 25 years. The twist in that year's Quarter Quell was that previous victors of The Hunger Games would be reaped instead of the usual male and female 12–18-year-olds. In the games, Katniss allies herself with Peeta Mellark, Finnick Odair, Wiress, Beetee Latier, Johanna Mason, and Mags Flanagan. While in the games, Katniss begins to realize her feelings for Peeta. While in the arena, she kills Gloss after he kills her ally Wiress. At the end of the book, she destroys the force field containing the Games arena and is rescued along with a few surviving tributes by members of an underground rebellion organised by the supposedly destroyed District 13 and Plutarch Heavensbee. In the third installment, she is caught in a love triangle with Gale (her childhood friend) and Peeta. She becomes the Mockingjay, an inspirational symbol of a second civil war against the Capitol. Despite her intentionally limited role as a propagandist, she is drawn into combat by her obsession to kill Snow. As the war progresses, she comes to realize the rebel leader, President Alma Coin, is no less ruthless and power-driven than Snow. Katniss learns that Coin considers her expendable; Coin staged a supposed Capitol atrocity which kills Prim, and after the war, calls for a final Hunger Games using the children of the Capitol war criminals. When finally given the chance to execute Snow, Katniss kills Coin instead. She is deemed not mentally responsible and returns to District 12, suffering trauma and suicidal depression. Peeta's return draws her out of the depression, and she finally realizes she loves him. Fifteen years after they marry, she decides to have children, giving birth to a girl and a boy.

=== Peeta Mellark ===
Peeta Mellark is a male tribute from District 12 in both the 74th and 75th Hunger Games. He is the same age as Katniss, with fair skin, blond hair, and blue eyes, characteristic of the town residents of District 12, whose middle-class merchants are slightly more well-to-do than those of the Seam. Peeta is a baker's son and lives with two older brothers, a quiet father, and a strict disciplinarian mother. Growing up in the bakery helped Peeta to become "broad-shouldered and strong," which Katniss immediately theorized would force other tributes not to write him off in the arena. His skills include physical strength, personal charm and charisma, public speaking, baking, and painting. He is also known for his kindness and generosity. He is highly intelligent and is always thoughtful, balancing Katniss's impulsiveness. He is described as handsome and even beautiful, with features as minuscule as his eyelashes capturing Katniss's attention. Peeta's favorite color is orange. Peeta has been in love with Katniss ever since he first saw her during elementary school and declares his love for her during the pre-Games interview. Katniss believes this is a ploy to gain the support of sponsors to help them survive the Games. When they were young, Peeta saves Katniss and her family from starving to death by giving her bread, which he had accidentally burnt, and his mother had beaten him for. Since then, he is known as the "boy with the bread" to Katniss. During the first game, he carefully formulates a strategy to protect Katniss, part of which involves confessing his love for Katniss on TV in order to make her look desirable enough to have sponsors. Also, he decides to team up with the Careers and misleads them about Katniss. However, when the careers find this out, Peeta fights with them to save Katniss and is severely wounded.

In the Quarter Quell, he volunteers to replace Haymitch Abernathy as the male tribute from District 12, so that he can protect Katniss in the arena. The only time Katniss can sleep without nightmares relating back to the Games is when she is being held in Peeta's arms.

Peeta is captured by the Capitol at the end of the Quarter Quell and submitted to 'hijacking', a process of torture and brainwashing which gives him a fear of Katniss and effectively turns him into an assassination weapon against her. During the civil war, he is rescued and eventually rehabilitated by the rebels. After the Capitol is defeated, he returns to District 12 with Katniss and marries her. Twenty years after the war, they have two children, a girl and a boy.

=== Gale Hawthorne ===
Gale Hawthorne is a Seam resident boy who is two years older than Katniss and shares her hunting skill, dark hair, olive skin, and gray eyes. Through hunting, they have become best friends. Lean-muscled and handsome, Gale has caught the attention of several girls in District 12. Gale lives with his mother Hazelle and his three younger siblings (Rory, Vick, and Posy) after his father's death in the same mining accident that killed Katniss's father. Being from the Seam, Gale shares a slight resemblance to Katniss. This allows the people of the Seam to cover for his close relationship with Katniss by saying they are cousins to hide the fact that the "star-crossed lovers" storyline with Peeta was staged, as it is presumed her closeness with someone as good looking as Gale would draw suspicion. Though their portrayal as cousins effectively satisfies the press from the Capitol, it makes both Katniss and Gale very uncomfortable on several occasions.

In the second book, Catching Fire, Katniss returns to District 12, but their relationship cannot continue as it was, since Katniss and Peeta must play the part of lovers due to threats from the Capitol. Gale confesses his love for Katniss after she asks him to run away with her. Soon afterward, he is brutally whipped in public for hunting on Capitol land. Katniss rescues him, getting whipped on the left cheek in doing so, and then takes care of him and they share a kiss. He and Katniss prepare to fight as it becomes clear that a rebellion is about to begin. However, Katniss, along with Peeta, is selected for the Third Quarter Quell and must leave District 12 to return to the Games. Once again, Gale is forced to say goodbye to Katniss as she prepares for a fight to the death. The book ends with Katniss waking up to see Gale's face. She is extremely confused, having been in the Hunger Games, and Gale tells her District 12 is no more.

In Mockingjay, Gale fights in the rebellion in an epic war. When District 12 was destroyed, Gale led approximately 10% of the population to safety. The survivors are forced to move to what is left of District 13. Once the people of District 13 are aware of Gale's heroism, they reward him with a higher ranking and a communicuff (which is later taken from him as punishment for helping Katniss). Towards the end of the book, his relationship with Katniss deteriorates because he feels responsible for the death of Prim, Katniss's sister (as the bombs may have been constructed by him, although both are unsure). He mentions that he would always remind Katniss of Prim's death, which Katniss silently agrees with, and the two never see each other again after President Snow's death. Afterwards, Gale decides to remain in District 2, where he becomes a captain according to a letter from Annie Cresta. Katniss believes he has long since moved on and possibly has a girlfriend now.

=== Haymitch Abernathy ===
Haymitch Abernathy is a 'paunchy, alcohol-loving, handsome middle-aged man' who won the 50th Hunger Games (the Second Quarter Quell) 24 years before the events of the first book. He comes from The Seam and is described as having similar physical characteristics to Katniss and Gale: greyish hair and olive skin; in the Hunger Games films, he is portrayed with blond straight hair and blue eyes. When he was 16, Haymitch was reaped for the Second Quarter Quell, wherein four, instead of the normal amount of two tributes from each district participated. He became an ally to a girl named Maysilee Donner, the original owner of Katniss's symbolic mockingjay pin, but was later forced to watch her die. During the Games, he discovered a cliff at the edge of the Arena that concealed a force field, which would ricochet anything thrown in its direction. During the final moments of the Games, a severely wounded Haymitch positioned himself by the edge of the force field to face his final opponent, a female tribute from District 1. Since she was a career tribute and stronger than Haymitch, she was favored to win the encounter. However, Haymitch's strategy was to wait for his opponent to fling her ax at him, then he would duck, and the force field would hurl it back at her, burying it in her head. His plan was successful, leaving Haymitch the victor. Within two weeks of his victory, Haymitch's mother, younger brother, and girlfriend were all killed by President Snow as punishment for Haymitch using the force field to his advantage. Haymitch became an example of what happens to anyone who would defy the Capitol.

Following his victory, Haymitch became an alcoholic and has spent almost all of the next 24 years intoxicated. As the only surviving victor from District 12 (one of only two in the history of the Games), Haymitch has been forced to mentor all of its tributes, which consumed him with guilt by being obligated to participate in the Games that he hated. He stumbled through drunken fatalism and bemused curiosity all while teaching his new pupils his tricks. He dealt with these feelings with alcohol and by openly flouting the dignity of the games. He treats Peeta and Katniss with contempt, and initially is sarcastic, expending no effort to help them. However, when Katniss confronts him, he is stirred from his stupor and emerges as the pair's greatest advocate, impressed by her determination and Peeta's patience. Haymitch shows himself to be highly canny as he guides his protégés in a cleverly designed, highly unorthodox strategy aimed at ensuring the survival of both tributes.

In the book Catching Fire, the liquor supply in District 12 runs out. As a result, Haymitch suffers from alcohol withdrawal. It is left to Katniss and Peeta to coax him back to health and get him more liquor. After this incident, Katniss begins to develop a true affection and respect for him. When Katniss discovers Haymitch and his allies from District 13 and the Capitol failed to save Peeta from the arena as they did her, she claws him in the face. In Mockingjay, Haymitch is forced to go through detox in District 13, as they do not permit the consumption of alcohol. During the voting to decide whether the final Hunger Games will use the Capitol children, Haymitch votes yes, understanding Katniss's decision to make President Coin think she is on her side. After this, he continues to serve as a mentor to Katniss and Peeta, repairing his relationship with them and resumes his drinking after the war ends. Haymitch and Katniss, despite nearly always working towards the same goals, are usually hostile towards each other because they have similarly prickly personalities. Also, Katniss and Peeta both resent Haymitch for keeping information from both of them, sometimes at the request of the other. At the end of Mockingjay, Haymitch only appears by reference from Katniss who mentions that he is raising geese.

Haymitch is the protagonist of Sunrise on the Reaping which shares the story of his Hunger Game twenty-four years before he mentored Katniss. In the book, Haymitch is childhood friends with Katniss's father, in love with a girl named Lenore Dove, and chosen for the 50th Hunger Games after the original tribute is executed for trying to escape. Much like Katniss, Haymitch proves to be rebellious, actively working to sabotage the Games with the help of Beetee, Wiress, Mags and Plutarch Heavensbee. After killing the last tribute, Haymitch attempts to blow up the arena's generator and is implied to have succeeded. Afterwards, he is imprisoned for weeks and treated like a glorified pet while a heavily edited version of the Hunger Games is shown, the one that is viewed by Katniss and Peeta in Catching Fire. When Haymitch returns home, he discovers his house set on fire, killing his mother and younger brother, while Lenore Dove dies shortly thereafter from a poisoned sweet. As a result, Haymitch pushes everyone away to protect them from Capitol retaliation and descends into alcoholism and depression.

In the novel's epilogue, taking place following the events of the original trilogy, Haymitch is at first reluctant to take part in Katniss and Peeta's memorial book, but he eventually opens up to them, sharing with his friends for the first time his own story and telling them about everyone that he loved and lost along the way. The couple get Haymitch geese to raise in honor of Lenore Dove's memory while Haymitch, although unsure of how much longer he will live given his wrecked liver from decades of drinking, finally finds peace, having kept his promise to Lenore Dove to stop the Games.

=== Coriolanus Snow ===
President Coriolanus Snow is the main antagonist of the series. He is the autocratic ruler of the Capitol and all of Panem. Though seemingly laid-back, his demeanor hides a sadistic and psychopathic mind. He initially appears in The Hunger Games giving the official welcome at the opening of the Games, but he does not speak to Katniss face-to-face until Catching Fire, when he pays her a visit at home and tells her he is angry that both she and Peeta were allowed to survive the Hunger Games, because their act of defiance (preferring joint suicide to the prospect of one killing the other) has ignited rebellion in several of the Districts. She is too prominent to kill, but he threatens her family and Gale unless she proves to the Districts that her act of saving Peeta was merely that of a love-crazed teenager and was not related to any desire to defy the Capitol. Later, Snow indicates to her that she failed in this, meaning that some or all of his threats will come true. President Snow is described as having very puffy lips, which are most likely the result of an appearance-altering operation that is very popular in the Capitol. Katniss describes him as exuding a smell of blood and roses.

In Mockingjay, it is revealed that the smell of blood is due to oral sores he incurred from one of the poisons that he used to kill people in his megalomaniacal efforts to control Panem. He drank the poison in order to allay suspicions, then took the antidote, but resulted in bloody sores in his mouth. He also smells strongly of genetically enhanced roses, as he always wears a white rose in his lapel to cover the scent of blood. The strong smell invariably makes Katniss gag. He is said to have prostituted winning tributes, like Finnick Odair, forcing them to have sex with wealthy Capitol citizens, under threat of killing their loved ones if they refused. Snow claims he only kills for a purpose, and he promises Katniss he will always tell her the truth. Whether these assertions are true or not is left up to interpretation by Katniss, but she ultimately believes Snow due to her own doubts about Coin only being reinforced by his words. He dies at the end of Mockingjay, after Katniss shoots President Coin instead of him at his own public execution, and he laughs maniacally at the irony of said assassination. The rebels are unable to determine whether the cause of death was by choking on his own blood from his untreated mouth sores or because he was trampled by the mob in the panic following President Coin's assassination.

He is the main character of The Ballad of Songbirds and Snakes, which is set when he is aged 18. Having been orphaned during the war, he lives with his grandmother and his cousin Tigris. His family was once rich but had lost a lot of their wealth in the war, mainly due to their factory in District 13 being destroyed. He is assigned to mentor the female tribute from District 12, Lucy Gray Baird. In the leadup to the Hunger Games, they develop feelings for each other, culminating in a goodbye kiss before she enters the arena. Before and during the Hunger Games, the head gamemaker, Dr. Gaul, takes a personal interest in his education and assigns him to write a number of essays. On the first night of the Games, his friend Sejanus Plinth infiltrates the arena to administer funeral rites to a tribute, and Dr. Gaul forces Coriolanus to enter the arena and bring him out. They are attacked by a number of tributes, one of whom Coriolanus kills in self-defense. Dr. Gaul reveals that this was to educate him about the violence humans were capable of.

Lucy Gray wins the games, in part, due to illicit assistance she receives from Coriolanus: he helps her smuggle food into the arena, as well as a make-up compact filled with rat poison, which she uses to kill two other tributes. He also introduces her scent to the genetically modified snakes, which he suspects will be deployed in the arena as they are trained to only attack those with unfamiliar scents. As punishment for their indiscretions, he and Sejanus are sent to District 12 to serve as Peacekeepers. Coriolanus reunites with Lucy Gray, and they begin a relationship. The two of them get caught up in a rebel plot which Sejanus is part of, and Coriolanus is forced to kill the mayor's daughter, Mayfair Lipp, Lucy Gray's former romantic rival who it is suggested had manipulated her selection at the Reaping. Coriolanus reports the plot to the Capitol, for which Sejanus is hanged. Certain that his part in the scheme will be exposed, and with Mayor Lipp increasingly harassing Lucy Gray, whom he suspects of the murder of his daughter, the two of them run away from District 12 together. However, Lucy Gray realises Coriolanus's part in the death of Sejanus, and, deciding he cannot be trusted, leaves him. Coriolanus follows her, only to walk into a trap she had laid for him. He returns to the place they parted, and hearing her singing nearby, shoots a volley of bullets in all directions. She is not seen again after this, although it is unclear whether she was killed by Coriolanus, or she ran away and managed to survive. Coriolanus returns to District 12 and finds out he has been selected for officer training. He is placed on a hovercraft, ostensibly bound for an officer training school, only to find himself back in the Capitol. Dr. Gaul says that she had arranged for his assignment as a Peacekeeper, with the intent that it would be temporary and educational. He is effectively adopted by Sejanus's wealthy father Strabo, who is unaware of the role he played in his son's death and pays for Coriolanus's university fees. While at university, he interns as a gamemaker under Dr. Gaul and is set to inherit the Plinth fortune.

A number of features of the Hunger Games shown in the trilogy are revealed to be invented by Snow, either as a mentor or a gamemaker, namely the sponsoring of and betting on tributes, the Victors' Village, the Games being compulsory viewing, and payments for a victor's district. The Games themselves were revealed to have been a co-creation of his father, Crassus Snow, and his best friend Casca Highbottom. Casca and Crassus had fallen out after developing the idea of the Hunger Games as Highbottom had thought it an academic exercise and been horrified at the thought of it becoming reality. Later, Casca, recognizing several similarities between Crassus and his son transferred this grudge to Coriolanus. Snow's liking of the smell of roses is also explained: his family grew them on the roof of their house, and his mother used rose-scented cosmetic powder. The Ballad of Songbirds and Snakes also sees Snow begin the practice of poisoning people: initially indirectly through Lucy Gray, but later directly, when he poisons Casca Highbottom as revenge for mistreating him while serving as dean of his school.

In Sunrise on the Reaping, taking place forty years later and twenty-four years before Katniss's Hunger Games, Snow is now president and has become ill. Snow clashes with the rebellious Haymitch Abernathy and hints at his past with Lucy Gray—whose fate still remains unknown even forty years later—to Haymitch who fell in love with a girl from the Covey, the same nomadic group as Lucy Gray belonged to, named Lenore Dove. For Haymitch's rebellious actions in the Second Quarter Quell, Snow has Haymitch's house burned down with his mother and younger brother in it and Lenore Dove poisoned with a sweet.

=== Primrose Everdeen ===
Primrose "Prim" Everdeen is Katniss's younger sister. She is 12 years old in The Hunger Games and has blonde hair and blue eyes. Kind and compassionate, Prim is a skilled healer, a pupil of her mother. In Mockingjay, Prim is chosen by District 13 to train as a doctor. The events of Catching Fire and Mockingjay force Prim to become more solemn and mature beyond her 13 years. Katniss states that Prim is "the only person I'm certain I love".

At the Reaping for the 74th Hunger Games, Prim is chosen by lottery as the female "tribute" of District 12. Katniss volunteers to and takes her place. Before Katniss leaves for the Capitol, Prim makes her promise to try hard to win, and Katniss agrees. This promise guides many of Katniss's actions, and Katniss's sacrifice makes her symbolically popular in the Capitol, prompting Johanna to note that the Capitol cannot afford to threaten Prim to get to Katniss because of the potential outcry.

In "Mockingjay", President Alma Coin, head-of-state in District 13 and de facto political leader of all the rebelling districts, sends Prim as a casualty nurse into the final battle against the Capitol. Prim is one of many medics that rush in to aid survivors when a Capitol-marked hovercraft bombs a group of Capitol children huddled outside the gates of the Presidential palace. Katniss calls out a warning as the disguised bombs fall, and in her final moments, Prim spots Katniss and speaks her name.

Prim's death sends Katniss into a deep depression, leaving her unable to speak or interact with anyone for a time, her spirit nearly broken by the loss. As President Snow awaits execution, he tells Katniss the rebels were in fact behind the bombing and made it resemble the work of the Capitol and timed a second explosion to kill the medical corps assisting the first round of survivors. This leads Katniss to kill Coin instead of Snow, after realizing that President Coin was also a dictator who disguised herself as a liberator.

Buttercup, Prim's beloved cat, held a strong mutual dislike toward Katniss for years, but was so loyal to Prim that he journeyed from District 12 to District 13 to find Prim after the bombings, and back to 12 again at the war's end, hoping to find her a second time. Buttercup and Katniss ultimately united in their grief over losing Prim, with Buttercup taking to guarding Katniss at night. Peeta decided to plant primrose in the garden outside their house in the former Victor's Village, the smell of which was briefly intolerable to Katniss due to the plant's association with her sister, but ultimately, she found comfort in the flowers' presence and valued the deep affection and understanding which led Peeta to plant them.

== 10th Hunger Games tributes ==
=== Lucy Gray Baird ===
Lucy Gray Baird is the District 12 female tribute and victor of the 10th Hunger Games. She was not born in District 12 but was a member of the Covey, a group of travelling musicians. Following the war, the Covey were forced to settle down in District 12. Before the Reaping, Lucy Gray was in a relationship with fellow Covey member Billy Taupe, who was also seeing the mayor's daughter, Mayfair Lipp. Both girls discover this and Lucy Gray believes that Mayfair arranged for her to be reaped. Coriolanus Snow is assigned to be her mentor, and they develop mutual feelings. She dazzles audiences with her charisma and singing ability and has a penchant for snake charming. Coriolanus provides her with a compact to smuggle rat poison into the Games and familiarizes the snake mutations with her smell so they will not attack her. During the games, she poisons Wovey and Reaper, and is able to control the snake mutations. However, due to the illicit assistance she received, she receives very little publicity afterwards.

She is reunited with Coriolanus after he is assigned to District 12 as a Peacekeeper. She is the writer of the song "The Hanging Tree". After Mayfair is killed by Coriolanus, the mayor becomes determined to arrest Lucy Gray for her murder, so she and Coriolanus leave District 12, only for Lucy Gray to realize his role in the death of Sejanus Plinth. Deciding that he is untrustworthy, she flees and possibly leaves a trap. Coriolanus shoots a rifle in Lucy Gray's direction as she flees but is unable to find any evidence of what may have become of her. Lucy Gray's fate is left ambiguous as she never makes an appearance again and is swiftly erased from public memory by Dr. Gaul, who destroys all recordings of the games except for one master tape that she keeps for herself. In The Hunger Games, she is indirectly mentioned by Katniss, who references a District 12 victor other than Haymitch Abernathy.

In Sunrise on the Reaping, taking place forty years after The Ballad of Songbirds and Snakes, Lucy Gray is mentioned several times, but her fate remains unknown and she is mostly considered the mysterious victor who has all but vanished from memory. While searching the Covey's secret graveyard for Lenore Dove's grave, Haymitch stumbled across Lucy Gray's grave. However, the poem on it suggested that the Covey believed her to possibly still be alive, at least when they put up the grave marker. The poem on the grave marker read "yet some maintain that to this day she is a living child; that you may see sweet Lucy Gray upon the lonesome wild."

The characters name is a reference to the Wordsworth poem "Lucy Gray".

=== Jessup Diggs ===
Jessup Diggs is the District 12 male tribute in the 10th Hunger Games. He contracts rabies before the Games begins after being bitten by a rabid raccoon (or in the film, a bat) during his first night in captivity at the Capitol Zoo. By the time that the game begins, Jessup has already started to display symptoms, rejecting food and spitting in Reaper Ash's eye. He initially forms an alliance with his district partner, Lucy Gray, only to go completely rabid and start chasing her. He falls to his death during the chase when his assigned mentor, Lysistrata Vickers, bombards him with water bottles, using Jessup's rabies-induced hydrophobia to cause him to fall to his death. Lysistrata expresses deep sorrow for Jessup's death, having grown close to him, particularly after Jessup had saved Lysistrata's life during a rebel bombing.

=== Minor 10th Hunger Games tributes ===
- Facet is the District 1 male tribute in the 10th Hunger Games. Along with Velvereen, he is shot down by Peacekeepers while trying to escape the arena after the bombing. His assigned mentor is Livia Cardew.
- Velvereen is the District 1 female tribute in the 10th Hunger Games. Along with Facet, she is shot down by Peacekeepers while trying to escape the arena after the bombing. Her assigned mentor is Palmyra Monty.
- Marcus is the District 2 male tribute in the 10th Hunger Games. He is a former classmate of his mentor, Sejanus Plinth. When the tributes and mentors are being shown through the arena, a bombing attack opens up an exit, and he escapes, hiding in the sewers. He is later recaptured and badly beaten. At the start of the Hunger Games, he is strung from his wrists to a crossbar. Lamina kills him shortly after the games begin.
- Sabyn is the District 2 female tribute in the 10th Hunger Games. She leaps over a wall, while trying to escape the arena after the bombing, but falls to her death. In the film she is killed in the bombing attack. Her assigned mentor is Florus Friend.
- Circ is the District 3 male tribute in the 10th Hunger Games. He and Teslee capture a broken drone to redesign it as a weapon, but he is killed by the snake mutations before they can use it. In the movie, he was killed by Coral in the Cornucopia Bloodbath. His assigned mentor is Io Jasper.
- Teslee is the District 3 female tribute in the 10th Hunger Games. She and Circ capture a broken drone and redesign it. She survives until fourth to last, then is killed by Treech sneaking up with an axe. In the movie, she was killed by Mizzen in the Cornucopia Bloodbath. Her assigned mentor is Urban Canville.
- Mizzen is the District 4 male tribute in the 10th Hunger Games. He forms an alliance with Tanner and Coral. They betray Tanner, who is killed by Coral. Before they broke the alliance Coral killed Sol and Lamina along with help from Mizzen and Tanner. While he was being chased by reprogrammed drones, made by the District 3 tribute Teslee, he puts pressure on his bad knee that Lamina had injured, which made him fall and snap his neck. In the movie, he is killed by the poisonous snakes. His assigned mentor is Persephone Price.
- Coral is the District 4 female tribute in the 10th Hunger Games. She forms an alliance with Tanner and Mizzen, only to betray and kill Tanner. Before they broke the alliance, Coral killed Sol and Lamina along with help from Mizzen and Tanner. She is the second tribute to be killed by the snake mutations. Her assigned mentor is Festus Creed. She is known to have long, red hair. In the movie she is the leader of the Career Pack, considered the most likely to win, and comes out as the runner-up
- Hy is the District 5 male tribute in the 10th Hunger Games. He dies due to an asthma attack immediately before the games begin. In the movies, he was killed in the tunnels by Mizzen and Treech. His assigned mentor is Dennis Fling.
- Sol is the District 5 female tribute in the 10th Hunger Games. She is killed with a trident by Coral, with help from Mizzen and Tanner. Her assigned mentor is Iphigenia Moss.
- Otto is the District 6 male tribute in the 10th Hunger Games. He and Ginnee are both killed in the bombing attack. In the movie, he survived the bombing and he was probably killed by Treech and Tanner after the Cornucopia Bloodbath. His assigned mentor is Apollo Ring.
- Ginnee is the District 6 female tribute in the 10th Hunger Games. She and Otto are both killed in the bombing attack. Her assigned mentor is Diana Ring.
- Treech is the District 7 male tribute in the 10th Hunger Games. He is killed by Lucy Gray Baird with a snake mutation, finishing 3rd overall before Lucy Gray and Reaper. In the movie he joined the District 4 alliance with Tanner and was killed when he inhaled rat poison Lucy Gray dropped on him. His assigned mentor is Vipsania Sickle.
- Lamina is the District 7 female tribute in the 10th Hunger Games. She spends the majority of the Games sheltering on top of the crossbeam Marcus was hanging from. She kills Marcus with her axe, and then is eventually killed by Coral with help from Mizzen and Tanner. Her assigned mentor is Pliny Harrington.
- Bobbin is the District 8 male tribute in the 10th Hunger Games. He was killed by Coriolanus Snow when Coriolanus was sent to retrieve Sejanus Plinth from the arena. His assigned mentor is Juno Phipps.
- Wovey is the District 8 female tribute in the 10th Hunger Games. Wovey dies from drinking a water bottle that Lucy Gray had poisoned in the book, however, in the movie, Wovey is killed by the poisonous snakes. Her assigned mentor is Hilarius Heavensbee.
- Panlo is the District 9 male tribute in the 10th Hunger Games. He and Sheaf die from injuries sustained in the bombing attack. In the movie, he was killed by Coral in the Cornucopia Bloodbath. His assigned mentor is Gaius Breen.
- Sheaf is the District 9 female tribute in the 10th Hunger Games. She and Panlo die from injuries sustained in the bombing attack. In the movie, she was shot twice with a crossbow by Otto, in the Cornucopia Bloodbath. Her assigned mentor is Androcles Anderson.
- Tanner is the District 10 male tribute in the 10th Hunger Games. He forms an alliance with the District 4 tributes, only to be betrayed and killed by Coral. Before he was killed they worked together to kill Sol and Lamina. His assigned mentor is Domitia Whimsiwick.
- Brandy is the District 10 female tribute in the 10th Hunger Games. She is shot dead by Peacekeepers after murdering her mentor, Arachne Crane.
- Reaper Ash is the District 11 male tribute in the 10th Hunger Games. He killed a Peacekeeper sometime before the Reaping, and attacks Coriolanus on his arrival in the Capitol. Reaper spends most of his time creating a makeshift morgue for deceased tributes. He chases Lucy Gray, which forces him to drink from a puddle of water Lucy Gray had poisoned. He soon dies, leaving Lucy Gray the victor of the 10th Hunger Games. In the movie, he was willingly killed by the poisonous snakes. His assigned mentor is Clemensia Dovecote. Lucy Gray later attributes his strange behavior during the game to rabies, telling Snow that Reaper was infected when Jessup had spat in his eye on the night before the game started.
- Dill is the District 11 female tribute in the 10th Hunger Games. She dies early in the Games from tuberculosis. In the movie, she dies when drinking water poisoned by Lucy Gray Baird. Her assigned mentor is Felix Ravinstill.

== 50th Hunger Games tributes ==
=== Maysilee Donner ===
Maysilee Donner is Madge's aunt and was reaped along with Haymitch and two others for the 50th Hunger Games, becoming one of Haymitch's allies during the Games. Katniss's mother and she were friends. Maysilee is characterized by her mean demeanor toward others in District Twelve, Haymitch calling her "the most stuck-up girl in town." This extends to the District 12 escort, Drusilla Sickle, who physically assaults Maysilee. Yet, Maysilee's compassion manifests in her treatment toward the other Newcomers, assisting them with their district tokens. In the Games, she teams up with Haymitch after saving him from a fight against 3 Career tributes using poisonous darts. Maysilee's rage toward the Capitol culminates in her killing of Gamemakers in the arena. As punishment, Maysilee is killed by a large number of bright, "candy-pink birds," who use their razor-sharp beaks to fatally wound her in the neck. In the film adaptation, Snow has her killed as a result of her alliance with Haymitch. Haymitch stays with her until she dies. She finishes fourth in the Games. The mockingjay pin Madge gave Katniss belonged to Maysilee.

Maysilee appears in Sunrise on the Reaping which expands upon her story. It is also revealed that the recording that Katniss and Peeta had viewed of Haymitch's Games in Catching Fire was a heavily edited version created by the Capitol.

=== Louella McCoy ===
Louella McCoy, a thirteen-year-old girl, was reaped along with Haymitch and two others for the 50th Hunger Games, and was Haymitch's first ally. She and Haymitch have been friends since they were kids. She dies during the tribute parade and Haymitch carries her body to the steps of President Snow's mansion. She is replaced with a body double. Decades later, a young Katniss Everdeen reminds Haymitch of Louella.

=== Wyatt Callow ===
Wyatt Callow was the first male tribute reaped along with Haymitch and two others for the 50th Hunger Games. He is an oddsmaker from a family of bookmakers who take bets on prior editions of the Hunger Games, a taboo in District 12. His reputation as an oddsmaker initially leads to a schism within the District 12 tributes with only Maysilee initially allying herself with him. He ultimately reconciles with Haymitch after the two realize that an alliance is necessary as well as wanting to establish the Newcomers alliance with the other non-Career districts. Despite coming off as being unintentionally rude at times, he is ultimately shown to have a kind-hearted personality due to his immediate acceptance of Lou Lou, Louella's body double and constantly taking care of her in spite of her condition. During the initial bloodbath, Wyatt dies protecting Lou Lou, despite her low odds. In the books, he is killed by Panache Barker, who Maysilee later kills. In the film, he sacrifices himself after Silka throws her axe aiming for Lou Lou.

=== Lou Lou ===
Lou Lou is a young girl used as a body double for Louella McCoy after her death. Presumably the daughter of traitors to the Capitol from District 11, Lou Lou was surgically altered to look like Louella and was controlled by the Capitol via an earpiece and a pump that injected drugs into her body. Though Haymitch, Maysilee, and Wyatt were initially skeptical of her, they softened up toward her after realizing how the Capitol was torturing her. She survived the initial bloodbath that kicked off the 50th Hunger Games and found Haymitch. She was poisoned after inhaling the scent of toxic flowers, and Haymitch killed her to end her suffering.

=== Ampert Latier ===
Ampert Latier is the twelve-year-old son of Beetee Latier, the victor of the 34th Hunger Games. He is one of the male tributes from District 3 for the 50th Hunger Games. He is forced to compete in the Hunger Games to punish his father for attempting to sabotage the Capitol's communications system. Ampert conceptualizes the Newcomers alliance, encouraging the non-Career tributes to band together against the Careers. He recruits Haymitch to the alliance after Louella's death and trusts Haymitch in helping him carry out his father's plans in hijacking the games. Ampert is also shown to have high intelligence through using the tokens of the District 9 tributes as hidden explosives. During the Games, they made sure that there were as few Gamemakers awake as possible in order to carry out blowing up the arena's main water tank in order to disable the forcefield. Despite having two tokens to use as explosives, the subsequent explosion only partially damaged the arena and as punishment for organizing the plot, Ampert is killed by golden squirrel mutts that leave only his bones and axe behind.

=== Silka Sharp ===
Silka Sharp was one of the girls reaped from District 1 for the 50th Hunger Games. Like many Career tributes, she displayed a hostile attitude towards the non-Career districts and had a rivalry with Maysilee after the latter insulted her choice of fashion. She was bigger and better built than most of the male tributes and proved to be one of the most lethal tributes during the Games, killing many of the Newcomers during the bloodbath, surviving the hostile conditions of the arena as well as the volcano eruption. After the death of her remaining and closest ally Maritte, Haymitch, hiding in a tree, sees her crying and gives her a piece of chocolate before she runs away. The following day, whilst Haymitch was out getting firewood for his last remaining ally, Wellie, she decapitates the latter with her axe under the false pretense of self-defense and engages Haymitch in a bloody duel that leaves the two in heavy injuries. She nearly disembowels him before he tricks her into throwing her axe at the arena's forcefield resulting in her death.

In Catching Fire, Katniss and Peeta view a heavily edited version of her death while watching old Hunger Games to prepare for the 75th Hunger Games.

=== Panache Barker ===
Panache Barker was one of the boys reaped from District 1 for the 50th Hunger Games. He is related to Palladium Barker, the victor of the 46th Hunger Games, and considered the likeliest to win. Despite his massive size and skills with a sword, he proves to be a vain idiot, with Caesar Flickerman making a fool of him during his interview. However, he proves to be particularly lethal in the Games, killing six Newcomers single-handedly during the bloodbath, including Wyatt. Following the volcano eruption, Panache is partially injured. He and his District 4 allies Barba and Angler catch sight of Haymitch with the three soon confronting him. Panache nearly succeeds in killing Haymitch before Maysilee fatally shoots him with a poisoned dart.

In Catching Fire, Katniss and Peeta see the events surrounding his death while watching old Hunger Games in preparation for the 75th Hunger Games.

=== Maritte ===
Maritte was one of the girls reaped from District 4 for the 50th Hunger Games. According to Wyatt during his interview, she scored an 11. She is Silka's closest ally during the Games with her primary weapon being a trident. With five tributes left, Maritte and Silka pursue Haymitch and Maysilee, engaging them in combat until they stumble across a group of Gamemakers performing arena maintenance. Maritte and Maysilee each kill a Gamemaker, the latter challenging Maritte and District 4's allegiance to the Careers. Maritte is later executed by the same golden squirrel mutts used to kill Ampert. She finishes fifth in the Games.

=== Wellie ===
Wellie was one of the female tributes reaped from District 6 for the 50th Hunger Games. She becomes one of Haymitch's first allies after Louella's death as he recruits her and her district partners into Ampert's alliance of non-Career tributes after they were bullied by the Careers. Wellie comes up with their name, "the Newcomers", after the other Districts debated on what name should be used for their alliance. Ampert tells Haymitch that Wellie was the first to realize the arena's poisonous properties. Wellie survived most of the Games, even after the Careers and Newcomers were all but wiped out. After Maysilee's death, Haymitch finds a starving Wellie and feeds her, promising to protect her as Haymitch, Silka, and she are the final three contestants of the Games. Haymitch arms her with a single dart that used to belong to Maysilee as he went off to gather firewood, only to return to find that Silka decapitated Wellie with her axe after she tried to claim that Wellie had attempted to kill her.

=== Kerna ===
Kerna was one of two District 9 girls reaped for the 50th Hunger Games. She was notably smaller than the rest of her district partners. During training, Panache had attempted to recruit District 9 to join them as a response to the growing Newcomer alliance. After rejecting his offer, in retaliation, he snatched and broke Kerna's token, reducing her to tears. Maysilee then repaired her token as a gesture of goodwill which led to District 9 allying themselves with the Newcomers. She was killed during the bloodbath alongside the rest of her District, with Kerna being the last person Haymitch saw at the Cornucopia before he ran off into the woods.

=== Minor 50th Hunger Games tributes ===
- Loupe is the second male tribute to be reaped from District 1 for the 50th Hunger Games. He is killed by Maysilee during the second day after she spotted him and Camilla breaking away from the remainder of the Careers.
- Carat is the second female tribute to be reaped from District 1 for the 50th Hunger Games. She shortly dies after the initial bloodbath after unknowingly eating the poisonous food of the arena.
- Alpheus is one of two male tributes reaped from District 2 for the 50th Hunger Games. He is killed during the volcano eruption alongside the rest of his district.
- Janus is one of two male tributes reaped from District 2 for the 50th Hunger Games. He is killed during the volcano eruption alongside the rest of his district.
- Camilla is one of two female tributes reaped from District 2 for the 50th Hunger Games. On the second day, she is nearly killed by Maysilee after she spots her and Loupe away from the rest of the Career pack but survived the attack. She was later killed two days later alongside the rest of her district following a volcano eruption.
- Nona is one of two female tributes reaped from District 2 for the 50th Hunger Games. She is killed during the volcano eruption alongside the rest of her district.
- Lect is the second male tribute reaped from District 3 for the 50th Hunger Games. He is killed during the volcano eruption alongside the rest of his district.
- Dio is one of two female tributes reaped from District 3 for the 50th Hunger Games. She is killed during the volcano eruption alongside the rest of her district.
- Coil is one of two female tributes reaped from District 3 for the 50th Hunger Games. She is killed during the volcano eruption alongside the rest of her district.
- Urchin is one of two male tributes reaped from District 4 for the 50th Hunger Games. He was one of the tributes that was forced to share his horse carriage with Haymitch following Louella's fatal accident. He died shortly after the bloodbath after consuming an unknown substance from the arena, succumbing to the poison shortly.
- Angler is one of two male tributes reaped from District 4 for the 50th Hunger Games. He was with the career pack for the first three days. During the volcano eruption, he, his district partner Barba and Panache come across Haymitch and attempt to ambush him. He is subsequently killed after Haymitch lodges his axe into Angler's neck.
- Barba is the second female tribute reaped from District 4 for the 50th Hunger Games. She was with the career pack for the first three days. After coming across Haymitch during the volcano eruption, she and her district partners Angler and Panache attempt to kill him. During the fight, Haymitch fatally stabs her in the gut with his axe.
- Hychel is one of two male tributes reaped from District 5 for the 50th Hunger Games. He is either killed in the bloodbath or died during the volcano eruption.
- Fisser is one of two male tributes reaped from District 5 for the 50th Hunger Games. He is either killed in the bloodbath or died during the volcano eruption.
- Anion is one of two female tributes reaped from District 5 for the 50th Hunger Games. She dies during the volcano eruption alongside one of her male district partners.
- Potena is one of two female tributes reaped from District 5 for the 50th Hunger Games. She is killed during the bloodbath alongside one of her male district partners.
- Miles is one of two male tributes reaped from District 6 for the 50th Hunger Games. He is killed during the bloodbath alongside his district partner Velo.
- Atread is one of two male tributes reaped from District 6 for the 50th Hunger Games. He and his district partner Wellie survived the initial bloodbath and regrouped with the remaining newcomers at their mountain before is killed during the volcano eruption.
- Velo is the second female tribute reaped from District 6 for the 50th Hunger Games. She is killed during the bloodbath alongside her district partner Miles.
- Bircher is one of two male tributes reaped from District 7 for the 50th Hunger Games. He is killed during the bloodbath alongside his district partner Heartwood.
- Heartwood is one of two male tributes reaped from District 7 for the 50th Hunger Games. He is killed during the bloodbath alongside his district partner Bircher.
- Autumn is one of two female tributes reaped from District 7 for the 50th Hunger Games. Alongside her district partner Ringina, she engages in a two-versus-two against Silka and Maritte before she is killed during the fight.
- Ringina is one of two female tributes reaped from District 7 for the 50th Hunger Games. Haymitch has a friendly interaction with Ringina during training and wonders how he could bring himself to kill her, or any of the tributes. Alongside her district partner Autumn, she engages in a two-versus-two against Silka and Maritte before she is killed during the fight.
- Wefton is one of two male tributes reaped from District 8 for the 50th Hunger Games. He is killed during the bloodbath alongside the rest of his district.
- Ripman is one of two male tributes reaped from District 8 for the 50th Hunger Games. He is killed during the bloodbath alongside the rest of his district.
- Notion is one of two female tributes reaped from District 8 for the 50th Hunger Games. She is killed during the bloodbath alongside the rest of her district.
- Alawna is one of two female tributes reaped from District 8 for the 50th Hunger Games. She is killed during the bloodbath alongside the rest of her district.
- Ryan is one of two male tributes reaped from District 9 for the 50th Hunger Games. He is killed during the bloodbath alongside the rest of his district.
- Clayton is one of two male tributes reaped from District 9 for the 50th Hunger Games. He is killed during the bloodbath alongside the rest of his district.
- Midge is the second female tribute reaped from District 9 for the 50th Hunger Games. She is killed during the bloodbath alongside the rest of her district.
- Buck is one of two male tributes reaped from District 10 for the 50th Hunger Games. He survived the initial bloodbath alongside his district partner Stamp but later died from poison after having the quills of a bear-sized porcupine embedded in him, eventually succumbing to its effects despite Haymitch and Maysilee attempting to save him.
- Stamp is one of two male tributes reaped from District 10 for the 50th Hunger Games. He survived the initial bloodbath alongside the rest of his district but was soon killed during the volcano eruption.
- Lannie is one of two female tributes reaped from District 10 for the 50th Hunger Games. She is killed during the bloodbath alongside her district partner Peeler.
- Peeler is one of two female tributes reaped from District 10 for the 50th Hunger Games. She is killed during the bloodbath alongside her district partner Lannie.
- Hull is one of two male tributes reaped from District 11 for the 50th Hunger Games. He initially survived the bloodbath but after the volcano eruption, he, his district partner Chicory and his ally Buck encounter a bear-sized porcupine mutt. Despite his best efforts in attempting to fight off the mutt, the embedded quills would poison him and despite surviving long enough for Haymitch and Maysilee attempting to apply the antidote on him, it spilled back out and he succumbed to his condition.
- Tile is one of two male tributes reaped from District 11 for the 50th Hunger Games. He is the sole District 11 tribute to be killed during the bloodbath.
- Chicory is one of two female tributes reaped from District 11 for the 50th Hunger Games. She initially survived the bloodbath alongside the majority of her district and allied herself with her district partner and Buck but was eventually poisoned after the three encountered a bear-sized porcupine mutt that proceeded to poison all three of them despite Haymitch and Maysilee attempting to save the three.
- Blossom is one of two female tributes reaped from District 11 for the 50th Hunger Games. She initially survived the bloodbath alongside the majority of her district but was then killed during the volcano eruption.
- Woodbine Chance is the second tribute reaped for the 50th Hunger Games. He tried to run away after being reaped, but was fatally shot before he could escape. Haymitch was selected as his replacement.

== 74th Hunger Games tributes ==
=== Marvel ===
Marvel is the District 1 male tribute in the 74th Hunger Games. Marvel was a Career tribute and was very skilled at throwing spears. He scored a 9 in his private session, a score considered low for a Career. Marvel played a strong part in the initial bloodbath, killing off many of the 13 tributes that died in the first 8 hours. He then took part in the hunt for Katniss during the Games, along with the other Career tributes and Peeta. When the Careers were attacked by the tracker jacker nest, he survived as the sole District 1 tribute. He survived through to the final eight tributes but was then shot in his neck by Katniss (or in the film, his stomach), in self-defense, after he had fatally speared Rue, Katniss's ally. He finished 8th overall.

=== Glimmer ===
Glimmer is the District 1 female tribute in the 74th Hunger Games. She was a Career tribute. She chose to use bow and arrows as her weapons during the bloodbath, but it is later revealed that she was incompetent at shooting. Glimmer was later indirectly killed by Katniss after she dropped a tracker jacker nest on the career tributes along with the District 4 female tribute (book). After her death, Katniss managed to steal her bow and arrows from her 'dismembered body'. Katniss had to break several of her bloated fingers to retrieve the bow from her. Glimmer finished 12th overall. Her death was described as extremely disgusting. In the film, she was seen flirting with Cato during the games, but Cato left her to die when she was attacked by tracker jackers.

=== Cato ===
Cato is the District 2 male tribute in the 74th Hunger Games and the main antagonist of the first novel. He was the leader of the Career pack and tall, good-looking, the second largest/physically strongest tribute, being only slightly smaller than Thresh, the District 11 male tribute. In the training centre, he is shown being proficient in a variety of weapons. Katniss states that Cato's training distracted her: "I've been preoccupied with watching the boy from District 2 send a spear through a dummy's heart from fifteen metres." He was the only tribute in the 74th Hunger Games, aside from Katniss, who is confirmed to have volunteered for the Games. Cato was skilled with many weapons and proved this by scoring a 10 in his private session, earning many sponsors in the process. Cato played a strong part in the initial bloodbath, killing off many tributes, one being the District 4 male. He then took part in the hunt for Katniss during the Games, along with the other career tributes and Peeta. He managed to escape the attack of the tracker jackers, caused by Katniss while they were sleeping.

Cato made it through to the final six and was absent from the feast, as Clove had gone to the Cornucopia herself and fought with Katniss. Cato presumably killed Thresh (book) and outlasted Foxface to make the final three, as she died to poison berries. At this point, gamemakers sent in mutations representing the dead tributes (book) and dogs (film) which drove Katniss, Peeta, and Cato to the cornucopia, where Cato is seen to have received full body armour. After a brief fight on the cornucopia, Cato captured Peeta, but Katniss shoots him in the hand, forcing him to release Peeta. He then falls off the cornucopia and is partially eaten by the mutts for several hours before Katniss mercifully kills him.

=== Clove ===
Clove is the female tribute from District 2. A Career tribute, she is described as having dark hair and possesses exceptional knife-throwing skills, receiving a training score of 10, typical for tributes from Career districts. During the initial bloodbath, Clove is the first to directly threaten Katniss, killing the male tribute from District 9 who attempted to attack her, then throwing a knife that Katniss deflected with her backpack.

Clove joined the alliance of Career tributes and took part in hunting Katniss throughout the arena out of resentment after Katniss outscored her in training. After cornering Katniss in a tree, Clove and her fellow Careers were weakened by a tracker jacker attack and by Katniss destroying their supplies. She reappears during the feast at the Cornucopia, where she ambushes Katniss and nearly kills her while taunting her over Rue's death. However, she is fatally attacked by Thresh, who avenges Rue after witnessing the fight. In the novel, Clove is killed by a strike to her head with a rock, while in the film, she is violently slammed against the Cornucopia's walls. In the Games, Clove finishes 6th overall.

=== Foxface ===
Foxface is the female tribute from District 5. Her real name is not revealed, and she is referred to by Katniss only as "Foxface" due to her sharp fox-like features. She received a training score of 5 and managed to survive the initial bloodbath at the Cornucopia, encountering Katniss in the process. Throughout most of the game, Foxface avoided direct confrontation with other tributes and relied on her stealth to survive.

Katniss sees Foxface again stealing food from the Career tributes' supply cache while carefully avoiding their booby traps. During the feast at the Cornucopia, she retrieves her district's bag while remaining hidden. She ultimately dies after unknowingly consuming nightlock berries Peeta had gathered, mistaking them for safe food. She finishes 4th overall; in the film adaptation, she finishes 5th.

=== Thresh ===
Thresh is the District 11 male tribute in the 74th Hunger Games. He was the physically strongest and largest tribute, which lent him an advantage in the Games, and was one of the oldest contenders. He scored a 10 in his private session, which proved he was as strong as the Career tributes. He survived the initial bloodbath and even killed one of the tributes himself. During the games, he stayed hidden away from all the other tributes, which helped him survive through to the final six. When the feast was announced, he made his way to the Cornucopia and witnessed Clove attack Katniss. He then brutally killed Clove, upon hearing her say that she killed Rue, his female counterpart. He spared Katniss's life as she was Rue's ally. His death in the book is very different from that in the film: in the book, he is presumably killed by Cato and finishes fifth overall. However, in the film, he is killed off-screen just as the Mutated Mutts are released and finishes fourth overall.

=== Rue ===
Rue is the District 11 female tribute in the 74th Hunger Games. She was the youngest of all the tributes in the Games, at just 12 years old. She scored a 7 in her private session which was unusually high for such a young tribute and most suspect that she got such a high score by demonstrating her climbing skills. Rue also survived the initial bloodbath. She spent the first few days climbing through the trees and hiding. On Day 5, she found Katniss up a tree, trapped there by the career tributes. She pointed out a tracker jacker nest to Katniss. Katniss planned to drop the nest on the careers and cut the branch it was hanging under, which caused it to fall on the Careers. This resulted in the deaths of Glimmer (and the female tribute from District 4 in the book). Katniss then collapses, having been stung by some of the tracker jackers, and sleeps for a few days. Rue tends to her tracker jacker stings during this time, stating that it was "lucky that she had the sense to pull out the stingers, otherwise she would have been a lot worse".

Upon her awakening, Katniss and Rue became allies. They talk, hunt, prepare food, and form a friendship. Rue asks questions about if Katniss likes Peeta and if all of it is true. Katniss also protects Rue while she sleeps. In both the film and book it is shown how much Rue reminds Katniss of her sister, Prim. Later, Katniss and Rue make plans to destroy the Careers' supplies. Katniss destroys the supply mountain the next day, shooting a sack of apples that, upon landing, sets off the pedestal mines that the male tribute from District 3 had reactivated, but Rue finds herself trapped in a net set up by the Careers. Katniss comes to her rescue, but, while dodging her own death, Marvel spears Rue in the abdomen. In the ensuing conflict, Marvel is killed by Katniss, who was trying to defend Rue. The dying Rue tells Katniss she has to win and asks her to sing for her as she died. When Katniss sees the violence of the Hunger Games happen personally to Rue, someone she deeply cared about and who was so young, caring, and innocent, it fuels her hate for the Capitol and the games as well. Rue also serves as motivation to the rebellion, her death causing several uprisings as well as Katniss presenting a speech for her. Rue finished seventh overall. Rue had five brothers and sisters, and her father died when she was 9. She was evidently close to her siblings and had some hunting skills, even though the only weapons she had were a slingshot and a rock for a knife. Rue is often mentioned by Katniss in the later books as they were not only allies but friends as well.

== 75th Hunger Games tributes ==
=== Finnick Odair ===
Finnick Odair is the male tribute from District 4 who was reaped into the Third Quarter Quell. He was 24 years old and described as being very handsome, muscular, athletic, and tall with tan skin, bronze hair, and stunning sea-green eyes. He was very popular among the people of the Capitol, both because he was a victorious Career tribute and a sex symbol, known for having many lovers in the Capitol, none of whom he stayed with for long. At age 14, he won the 65th Hunger Games by using a trident and a net against other tributes (a skill unique to District 4's trade of fishing). Katniss remarks that the trident given to him by a sponsor may have been the most expensive gift ever seen in the Games. During the Quarter Quell, Katniss is hesitant to make Finnick her ally, because she does not trust him—to her, he appears to be shallow, arrogant, and superficial. However, Finnick soon proved to be trustworthy by saving Peeta by using CPR to resuscitate him (which Katniss notes as, "one of the things I will never stop owing him for") and using his skills to provide shelter.

When jabberjays that make sounds of the screams of loved ones being tortured appear in the Quell, the one made to target Finnick used the voice of Annie Cresta, his "poor, mad" lover in District 4, who was also a victor of the Games. In Mockingjay, Finnick goes into depression as a result of Annie's being held prisoner by the Capitol, and forms a close bond with Katniss over their mutual pain and experiences. He assists the rebellion by appearing in rebel propaganda. He reveals that victors of the Games are often prostituted to wealthy citizens of the Capitol by President Snow, which resulted in Finnick's reputation for having many lovers. He also reveals all of the political secrets he learned from clients, including the fact that President Snow only became the leader of Panem by poisoning his opponents. Finnick is reunited with Annie (after District 13 retrieves her, Johanna, and Peeta from the Capitol), and they marry.

Finnick becomes a member of the "Star Squad" that went to fight in the Capitol during the final stages of the rebellion. He and Katniss fights off lizard mutations (or "mutts") during the infiltration of the Capitol, with Finnick holding them off for Katniss to escape, but is dragged back by them before he can escape himself. Katniss says "Nightlock" three times into the Holo, causing it to explode, allowing Finnick to die quickly and painlessly. In the novel, Finnick is instead decapitated by the mutts. Katniss sees moments from Finnick's life pass before her eyes as he dies. Some months after his death, Annie gives birth to their son.

Finnick and Katniss grow close in Catching Fire, and he was her best friend throughout the last novel, being one of the only people who understood what she was going through.

=== Beetee Latier ===
Beetee Latier is the District 3 male tribute in the 75th Hunger Games. He was skilled in electronics and won his games by electrocuting six tributes at once. Beetee also contributed substantially to the technology of the Capitol. He joined the alliance to protect Katniss and devised a plan to electrocute the Careers. Although injured, he survived the game and was brought by the rebels to District 13. Beetee joined the district's technology division, working on the military equipment and designing a bomb that President Coin later used to bomb the Capitol children and medics, killing Prim. However, Beetee had no direct role in the actual bombing itself with Gale Hawthorne later admitting that neither he nor Beetee knew for sure if it was their bomb that had been used. Beetee ultimately voted against a symbolic Hunger Games.

In Sunrise on the Reaping, Beetee is the father of one of the tributes for the 50th Hunger Games and plots with Haymitch, Wiress, Mags and Plutarch Heavensbee to sabotage the games. Afterwards, Plutarch reveals that Beetee's life was spared because he is simply too valuable to the Capitol, and Beetee chose not to commit suicide as his wife is pregnant again.

=== Mags Flanagan ===
Mags Flanagan is the female tribute from District 4. She was the oldest tribute in the Quarter Quell at approximately 80 years old and a victor of the 11th Hunger Games. Despite her frailty and limited speech—communicating mostly through gestures and fragmented words (portrayed as mute in the film adaptation)—Mags bravely volunteers in place of Annie Cresta, Finnick's girlfriend, aware that she has little chance of survival.

Mags is noted for her ability to fashion fishing hooks out of nearly any material. During the Quarter Quell, she teams with Katniss, Peeta, and Finnick. Mags eventually sacrifices herself by walking into a poisonous fog to spare the others from having to carry her and allow them to escape. She finishes 15th overall in the Games.

In Sunrise on the Reaping, Mags serves as a mentor to District 12 during the 50th Hunger Games due to the lack of surviving victors from that district. As part of an early rebellion plot, Mags and Wiress are later captured and tortured by the Capitol, resulting in lasting trauma that left Mags in a wheelchair.

=== Johanna Mason ===
Johanna Mason is the female tribute from District 7. She won her games by initially feigning weakness and cowardice to avoid being perceived as a threat, only revealing her viciousness once the competition narrowed. Haymitch implies that, like Finnick Odair, she may have been forced into prostitution by President Snow; however, it is also suggested that she resisted, prompting the Capitol to retaliate by executing her loved ones. The loss left her emotionally hardened and in turn, she openly defies the Capitol without fear of Snow retaliating: "He can't hurt me. There is no one left I love."

Sarcastic, blunt, and rebellious, Johanna first meets Katniss shortly after the 75th Tribute Parade and disrobes from her tree costume to unsettle her. She later teams with Katniss, Peeta, and Finnick in the Quarter Quell and safely brings Beetee and Wiress with her. As part of the secret rebel alliance, she protects Katniss during the arena's chaos and removes Katniss' tracker by cutting it from her arm. However, Johanna is captured by Capitol forces during the rescue mission at the end of Catching Fire.

In Mockingjay, she is rescued alongside Peeta and Annie and taken to District 13. Johanna suffers from trauma and a fear of water from Capitol torture involving repeated soaking and electrocution. As a result, Johanna panics during combat training and is ultimately not selected for the mission into the Capitol. She and Katniss room together after refusing extended treatment in the District 13 hospital. Johanna and all other surviving Victors post-rebellion later participate in the vote to hold a symbolic Hunger Games using Capitol children; Johanna casts her vote in favor.

=== Enobaria ===
Enobaria is the female tribute from District 2. A career tribute in both her previous Games and the Third Quarter Quell, she gained notoriety in her Games by tearing out another tribute's throat, an act that secured her victory and established her savage reputation. Following her win, she had her teeth sharpened into fangs and inlaid with gold to score her popularity within the Capitol.

During the Quarter Quell, Enobaria is the only tribute not aligned with the rebels to survive the arena. She is captured by Capitol forces alongside Peeta and Johanna but is notably not rescued by District 13; Boggs speculates that due to her career background, Enobaria may not have been detained in the same way, and Katniss even suggests that she was likely spared from torture. Although the book states that Victors were targeted by both sides during the war due to distrust over their loyalties, Enobaria remains alive at the war's end, making her the only surviving non-rebel victor. She votes in favor of holding a symbolic Hunger Games using Capitol children, stating that the Capitol should "taste their own medicine". Nevertheless, her inclusion among the surviving rebel victors prompted hostility from Johanna, who threatened to kill her. Her presence in the final vote and at President Snow's execution is retained in the film adaptations, although her capture and rescue are not depicted.

=== Other 75th Hunger Games Tributes ===
- Gloss is the male tribute from District 1 and the brother of his district's female tribute Cashmere. As Career tributes, Gloss and Cashmere won back-to-back Hunger Games. In Catching Fire, he is killed after Katniss shoots him with an arrow to the temple; in the film adaptation, she shoots him in the chest. He finishes 11th overall.
- Cashmere is the female tribute from District 1 and Gloss's sister. A lethal Career tribute alongside Gloss, she is depicted as beautiful and closely bonded with her brother. In the arena, she charges toward Katniss but is killed by Johanna, who throws an axe into her chest. In Mockingjay, Finnick implies that Cashmere was one of the many victors forced into prostitution by the Capitol.
- Brutus is the male tribute from District 2. In the film, he is shown as bald, muscular, and adept with spears. Unlike most of the other tributes, he seemed more eager to return to the Arena. He is the final tribute to die in the arena, killed by Peeta after Brutus kills Chaff; this was confirmed in Mockingjay during Peeta's interview with Caesar Flickerman. Brutus finishes 7th overall.
- Wiress is the female tribute from District 3 and an intellectual known for her technological expertise and erratic speech patterns. She discovers that the arena operates as a clock but becomes increasingly unstable after Blight's death. Wiress is killed by Gloss, who slits her throat in an ambush. In Sunrise on the Reaping, Wiress is a temporary mentor for District 12 during the 50th Hunger Games due to the district's lack of surviving victors. She won the 49th Hunger Games by figuring out her arena, which was covered in mirrored surfaces, and hiding until the Games were over. Both Wiress and Mags were involved in a covert rebel effort and were later tortured by the Capitol, causing Wiress's mental deterioration. She finishes 12th overall.
- An unidentified female Morphling is the District 6 female tribute in the 75th Hunger Games. She sacrificed herself by jumping in front of a monkey mutation before it could kill Peeta, who afterward comforted her in the book, by telling her stories about colors and letting her paint a flower on his face with her blood, and in the film by having her admire the sky. She finished 14th overall.
- An unidentified male Morphling is the District 6 male tribute in the 75th Hunger Games. Like his district partner, he is addicted to morphling and shows a love of painting and interest in color, demonstrated when he painted Peeta and Katniss at the camouflage station during training. He was killed in the bloodbath.
- Blight is the District 7 male tribute in the 75th Hunger Games. He protested his inclusion by not joining the Training Period. He formed an alliance with his fellow tribute, Johanna, and with Beetee and Wiress, but ran into a force field during a blood rain, which stopped his heart. Johanna stated: "he was not that much, but he was from home".
- Woof is the District 8 male tribute in the 75th Hunger Games. He is the second oldest living tribute, about 70 years old. He is forgetful and eats insects even after being told they are poisonous. He is killed in the bloodbath.
- Cecelia is the District 8 female tribute in the 75th Hunger Games. She had three children who begged her not to enter the Hunger Games, as seen in the footage of the Reaping. Katniss chose her as one of her allies in the arena, but Cecelia was killed in the bloodbath.
- Chaff is the District 11 male tribute in the 75th Hunger Games. He was the victor of the 45th Hunger Games and refused a prosthetic arm after losing it. Chaff was best friends with Haymitch, and they frequently drank together. He kisses Katniss during their first meeting, without warning, to tease her. He is killed by Brutus on the final day of the game, finishing 8th overall.
- Seeder is the District 11 female tribute in the 75th Hunger Games. She had dark hair and olive skin, which made her look like a person from the Seam if not for her golden eyes. She embraced Katniss after the chariot rides, assuring Katniss that Rue and Thresh's families were safe after the commotion in District 11. Katniss chose her as one of her allies in the arena, but she was killed in the bloodbath.

== Tributes from other games ==
=== Annie Cresta ===
Annie Cresta won the 70th Hunger Games for District 4. She has sea-green eyes and dark hair. She became mentally unstable after seeing the male tribute from her district decapitated. When an earthquake broke a dam, the arena was flooded. She won because, being from the fishing district, she was the best swimmer. Annie seems never to have fully recovered after the games and suffers from serious mental trauma. Despite this, she is a kind person. She is chosen at the Reaping for the Quarter Quell, but Mags volunteers to take her place, to spare her. Her scream is used by the jabberjays (birds that can mimic whatever they hear) in the Quarter Quell to torment Finnick Odair, who loves her. In Mockingjay, she and Finnick marry, and she gives birth to their son after his death. Annie votes against another Hunger Games for Capitol children, noting that, if alive, Finnick would do the same.

=== Titus ===
Titus was a male tribute from District 6 who competed in an unspecified Hunger Games. The Arena of that game was a frozen tundra, and the tributes were constantly in dire need of food. Titus became a cannibal by eating the corpses of dead tributes, forcing the Gamemakers to stun him with electric guns to collect the bodies. He was eventually killed by an avalanche, and since then, there is an unspoken rule for the tributes not to eat other tributes. Katniss speculates the Gamemakers staged his death to prevent a "lunatic" from winning the game.

=== Other Tributes from other games ===
- Porter Millicent Tripp was a female tribute from District 5 who competed in the 38th Hunger Games. Though she was not mentioned in any of the books or movies, she was depicted in the Capitol Couture. She suffered from a neck injury that was given to her during the games. She is most likely deceased, as she was absent from the voting of the 76th Hunger Games.
- Palladium Barker was a male tribute from District 1 who competed in the 46th Hunger Games. He was mentioned in Sunrise on the Reaping by Wyatt Callow, who was calculating Panache Barker's odds. Palladium was most likely related to Panache. He is most likely deceased, as he was absent from the voting of the 76th Hunger Games.
- Augustus Braun was a male tribute from District 1 who competed in the 67th Hunger Games. He was also known as "Panem's Favorite Son" and "Cavalier Career". He is most likely deceased, as he was absent from the voting of the 76th Hunger Games.
- Commander Lyme was a female tribute from District 2 and victor of an unknown Games. She became Commander for District 2 for the Rebellion. She is most likely deceased, as she was absent from the voting of the 76th Hunger Games.

== The Capitol ==
=== Effie Trinket ===
Effie Trinket is a Capitol woman who was assigned to oversee District 12's tributes in the Hunger Games, most notably Katniss and Peeta in the 74th and 75th Games. She must carry out such tasks as drawing the tributes' names at the Reaping and escorting them to the Capitol once they have been reaped. At first, she shows herself brainwashed and clueless. Later, Effie becomes attached to her District 12 charges. During the 74th Hunger Games, Effie appears oblivious to the misfortunes of District 12 and The Hunger Games. She dresses in the expensive, flamboyant manner typical to the Capitol and has a different-colored wig to go with the prevailing color of her clothes, leading Katniss to wonder if Capitol citizens realize "how freakish they look to the rest of us."

Mostly interested in moving up in Capitol society and in keeping with her socialite ambitions, Effie is keenly attentive to and highly knowledgeable of customs, courtesies and manners in the Capitol, always showing up on time. Katniss notes in the first book that "although she can be tiresome, Effie has a very keen instinct about certain things" and "a certain determination I admire". Effie's catchphrase in the first book is "Happy Hunger Games, and may the odds be ever in your favor!"

During the 75th Hunger Games, Effie's facade of perky civility cracks as she faces the prospect of seeing Katniss and Peeta forced into the arena for a second time. In the film of Catching Fire, Effie starts off trying to plan out a yellow-gold fashion theme that she, Haymitch, Katniss and Peeta will share. She insists this is to "Show them we are a team!" She then struggles to continue, managing "They can't just-" before becoming too emotional to continue. This leads Haymitch, Katniss and Peeta to each gently express empathy, appreciating Effie's concern.

For reasons unknown, however, Effie was not brought in on the scheme to bring down the 75th Hunger Games and rescue the surviving victors to kick off a second rebellion against the Capitol. In Mockingjay, it is said she was imprisoned after Katniss's escape but unlike many others Katniss knew in the Capitol, she is not executed. She meets up again with Katniss before Snow's execution, and Katniss notes that she now has a "vacant look" in her eyes. The book states Haymitch and Plutarch had some difficulty in keeping her from being executed at the end of the war, but her imprisonment had actually helped in that regard. In the films, Effie's role in the third film, Mockingjay Part 1, is expanded as, rather than getting captured by the Capitol, she is instead evacuated by the Rebels and taken to District 13. Though initially hesitant, she eventually consents to help Katniss and effectively replaces the role of Katniss's prep team, who does not appear beyond the second film.

In the end of Mockingjay Part 2, Effie and Haymitch share a kiss while she says goodbye to Katniss, hearing from Haymitch "don't be a stranger". This scene is not in the books.

Effie appears in Sunrise on the Reaping where she's one of Haymitch's stylists for the 50th Hunger Games. She appears in the book after going to help her sister Proserpina Trinket, who was part of Haymitch's preparation team, so she ends up being included in the team and helping the tributes with clothes that belonged to her relatives. Because of this, we know more about her family's past and that her grandparents' uncle had stained the name of the family.

She ends up helping Haymitch get into the tubes that lead to the arena, advises him not to leave the place before the time and promises to deliver Lenore Dove's gift back to her if he dies, it is mentioned that he realizes that she is shaking.

After the arena, Effie replaces the injured District 12 chaperone Drusilla Sickle in accompanying Haymitch on the Victory Tour and other public events, setting up her taking that escort job. Haymitch also mentions that "The only person who kept an eye on me is Effie Trinket", anticipating what we would see in the future where she tried to help him not to drink.

=== Cinna ===
Cinna is Katniss's stylist, responsible for her public appearances. After designing the spectacular outfits for the opening ceremony, which include costumes ignitable with synthetic fire, he nicknames Katniss "the Girl on Fire". Cinna is in his first year as a stylist for the Games and specifically requested to be assigned to District 12. His amazing designs immediately win over the audience in favor of the District 12 tributes. Cinna is better than most at seeing through the superficiality and spectacle of the Games to their barbaric core. Cinna's role was also to support and calm Katniss down before entering the arena. Although he did this very subtly, he had a unique nonverbal connection, which gave Katniss much strength. He and Katniss establish an easy, comfortable relationship, and he demonstrates a genuine concern for her well-being.

In Catching Fire, Cinna dresses Katniss for her television interview in her wedding dress, as insisted by President Snow, but alters it so that when Katniss raises her arms and twirls, the white dress burns away to be replaced with a black and grey dress of feathers that resembles a mockingjay, which has become the symbol of the resistance in Panem. Because of this, Cinna is savagely beaten in front of Katniss, right before she enters the arena for the Quarter Quell, which unnerves her greatly. It is suggested that he might have been tortured to death after the arena explodes. Effie Trinket states in Mockingjay, Part 1, before showing Katniss sketches of her Mockingjay costume made by Cinna, that he is dead. Cinna is very different from the other inhabitants of the Capitol. He does not use surgery to alter his features, wears simple black clothes, and leaves his hair its natural dark brown color, close-cropped. His only concession to the Capitol's fashion style is a small amount of metallic gold eyeliner, applied with a light hand, that brings out the gold flecks in his green eyes. In Mockingjay he is confirmed as one of the rebels.

=== Plutarch Heavensbee ===
Plutarch Heavensbee becomes Head Gamemaker following the death of Seneca Crane. He is actually the judge who falls into the punch bowl when Katniss shoots the apple out of a pig's mouth during her scoring in the first book, but Katniss does not formally meet him until the Victory Tour celebration in the second book. He is later shown to be the leader of the rebel movement in the Districts and is the mastermind behind the plan to break the tributes out of the arena in Catching Fire. He tries to give Katniss hints about the nature of the arena for the Quarter Quell, but Katniss does not pick up on it until much later. In Mockingjay he has become a "rebel filmmaker", and helps create propaganda featuring Katniss as the Mockingjay for District 13's war against the Capitol. He is elected Secretary of Communications after the war ends.

Plutarch appears in Sunrise on the Reaping as a young cameraman covering the 50th Hunger Games. Plutarch offers Haymitch advice about the arena and reveals his involvement in a rebel movement made up of several victors and tributes, some of whom would later be involved in the rebellion in Catching Fire and Mockingjay. Haymitch wonders several times if Plutarch can really be trusted, particularly because he comes out of the failed rebellion fairly well off compared to everyone else. Plutarch tells Haymitch that while their efforts failed, they need someone like him who is luckier and with better timing in the future to succeed, although it may not be in their lifetime. Plutarch speaks of building an army or better yet finding one to that end. When Haymitch accuses Plutarch of exploiting the games for his benefit, Plutarch states that he's no one's idea of a hero, but he's still in the game. He is related to Hilarius Heavensbee, a mentor in the 10th Hunger Games.

=== Seneca Crane ===
Seneca Crane is the Head Gamemaker during the 74th Hunger Games. The bait-and-switch tactic of proclaiming two tributes could win if they came from the same district was his idea, so when it came back to bite the Capitol in the end, Crane was held responsible for the embarrassment. Near the beginning of the Catching Fire book, Snow tells Katniss that he had him executed for letting both her and Peeta live. At the end of the first Hunger Games film, Crane is shown being escorted by Capitol guards and locked in a room containing poisonous nightlock berries to consume. In both the Catching Fire book and film, Katniss hangs a dummy with the words "Seneca Crane" on it before the judges when her skills test is performed, shocking the judges greatly.

=== Prep team ===
Octavia, Venia, and Flavius are Katniss's prep team. They are residents of the Capitol and sport the radically altered appearances typical of Capitol residents, including pea-green skin (Octavia), aqua-colored hair and a face etched with gold tattoos (Venia), and orange corkscrew hair and purple lipstick (Flavius). At first, it appears they are dull-witted and care only about their appearance. However, they prove themselves less shallow when they begin to cry while preparing Katniss for the Quarter Quell, from which they do not expect her to return. Katniss gleans valuable information from them by listening to them gossip about shortages of supplies, giving Katniss clues about which districts have rebelled. In Mockingjay, they are kidnapped and taken to District 13 to help with Katniss's styling, and they very quickly run afoul of District 13's draconian rules and end up cruelly punished for stealing bread. Katniss orders them set free and healed. Venia is said to have always been the strongest: for example, in Catching Fire, Venia is the only one to contain her emotions while working on Katniss's appearance, while Octavia and Flavius both need to leave the room to control their emotions. Katniss's prep team only appears in the first two films (except for Venia, who only appears in the first); their roles in the final two films are filled by Effie.

=== Caesar Flickerman ===
Caesar Flickerman is the Master of Ceremonies and commentator for the Hunger Games, along with Claudius Templesmith. He has served as the master of ceremonies since the 50th Hunger Games, but his unchanged appearance leads Katniss to speculate that he had received extensive surgeries to look and be as young as possible. Caesar interviews each Tribute on live television the night before the Games begin and is renowned for his innate ability to create relaxed, insightful conversations, making each Tribute stand out to the audience and potential sponsors. Flamboyantly outgoing and stylish, Caesar is also known for wearing a different color of hair and suit for each Hunger Games, though not all his selections have gone over well, such as a frightening blood-red hair dye that he used at the 73rd Hunger Games (and did not use again). In the films, he is also known for flashing a huge smile and distinctive laugh. He interviews Peeta after the events of the 75th Hunger Games in Mockingjay and makes no further televised appearances after Peeta's rescue by rebel commandos, his fate unspecified. It is implied that he is a descendant of the first Hunger Games commentator, Lucky Flickerman.

=== Tigris Snow ===
Tigris Snow is a former Hunger Games stylist who later works in a small shop specializing in fur-trimmed underwear in the Capitol. Her face has been altered into a "semi-feline mask" through many surgical operations. It is implied these alterations, too strange for even people in The Capitol, caused her to be shunned and banned as a stylist for the Games; this resulted in Tigris's becoming embittered towards the Capitol. She aids Katniss's squad on their final mission by hiding them in her shop and disguising them. When Katniss offers Tigris food, she says: "I eat next to nothing, and then, only raw meat". After that, Katniss says that Tigris is too into her character.

In The Ballad of Songbirds and Snakes, she is revealed as Coriolanus Snow's cousin (raised as his sister), and is three years his senior. She cooks for him and their grandmother as the rest of their family are dead. In this book, she is training to be a fashion designer, and she and Coriolanus are shown to care deeply for each other.

=== Volumnia Gaul ===
Dr. Volumnia Gaul is a sadistic and misanthropist mad scientist who is the indirect creator of the Hunger Games. She is the initial Head Gamemaker of the 10th Hunger Games. She developed the Hunger Games from an assignment done by two of her university students before the war, Crassus Snow and Casca Highbottom. She views the Games as a way to represent the lack of control and order without the Capitol in a Hobbesian fashion. She is also head of the Capitol's Experimental Weapons Division, creating many muttations as part of her job, and a professor of military theory at the university. In The Ballad of Songbirds and Snakes, she behaves eccentrically and sadistically places mentors in dangerous situations. She specifically takes a particular liking to Coriolanus Snow, due to his ideas for the Games and thoughts on control and order. Eventually, she has him honorably discharged from the Peacekeepers, enrolls him at the university, and even makes him an intern for the Gamemakers.

In Sunrise on the Reaping, taking place forty years later, Haymitch recalls that Gaul hosted the 25th Hunger Games, the First Quarter Quell, with Lucky Flickerman. Haymitch described Gaul as a relic of a woman at that point who was credited with coining the phrase "may the odds be EVER in your favor." The phrase caught on as a way to wish someone good luck, but Haymitch considered it to be a sadistic thing to say to a tribute given that survival's an impossibility for twenty-three of the twenty-four kids.

=== Casca Highbottom ===
Casca Highbottom is the academic dean of the Academy, the most prestigious high school in Panem, and publicly credited as the creator of the Hunger Games. While attending the university, Crassus Snow got him drunk during an assignment to get him to give him all his ideas for a thought experiment, this assignment later morphed into the Hunger Games. Traumatized and betrayed by his former best friend, Highbottom became a morphling addict, leading to a young Coriolanus Snow to mockingly call him "High-as-a-kite-Bottom" behind his back. He never forgave Crassus for what he did and so he made his son, Coriolanus, the mentor for Lucy Gray Baird out of revenge. Eventually he proves Coriolanus cheated in the Games and forces him to join the Peacekeepers as punishment, clueless that Dr. Gaul was backing Coriolanus from behind the scenes. Just before Coriolanus started at the university, he visited Highbottom one final time, his mere presence back in the Capitol proof that, despite all Highbottom's efforts to finish his hated enemy for good, "Snow lands on top." Highbottom dies soon after as he takes tainted morphling that Coriolanus intentionally left behind, the first to die from Snow's signature weapon of poison.

=== Minor Capitol characters ===
- Claudius Templesmith is an announcer and commentator for the Hunger Games with Caesar Flickerman.
- Portia is Peeta's stylist in the 74th and 75th Hunger Games. She is only mentioned a few times in the series. She praises Katniss on a job well done in the first book, when Katniss receives an 11 in her private session. Alongside the other stylists and prep teams for other tributes (except for Katniss's prep team), Portia is publicly executed by the Capitol after the Third Quarter Quell due to their alleged collaboration with the tributes that facilitates their escape from the arena.
- Atala is the training center coach before the Games.
- Cressida is the resident director from the Capitol. She and her camera crew join the rebellion, moving to District 13 after fleeing the Capitol. Cressida is described as "a woman with a shaved head tattooed with green vines". She films propos for District 13 and later accompanies Katniss and her squad during their assault on the Capitol. She becomes upset by the deaths of two of her crew members, Castor and Messalla, but survives the war and begins filming the war destruction in Panem alongside Pollux.
- Messalla is Cressida's assistant from the Capitol. He moved to District 13 after fleeing the Capitol. He assists in filming propos for the rebels in Districts 8 and 13. He joins the Star Squad in the rebellion, on their final mission in the Capitol. When the troops find their way into the Capitol's underground, they are soon found by lizard mutations. While fleeing from the lizards, Messalla is killed by a pod that emits a shaft of impenetrable light, melting his skin off.
- Castor and Pollux are brothers who comprise Cressida's camera crew from the Capitol. They often wear "insect shells", a wearable carapace to hold the camera. Pollux is a former Avox, having escaped from servitude in the Capitol, and Castor interprets for him. As photojournalists, they are courageous and have an incredible sense for "capturing the right moment" on film. After Katniss sings "The Hanging Tree", Pollux comes to truly accept and admire her. Castor is killed by the lizard mutations, with Finnick and Homes, while Pollux survives and assists Cressida to document the war destruction after the war's end. The brothers' names derive from the twins of Greek mythology. In the myth, as in Mockingjay, Castor is killed, while Pollux lives on, alone.
- Clemensia Dovecote is a mentor during the 10th Hunger Games. After the death of Arachne Crane, she is very affected and fails to help Coriolanus Snow write the essay Dr. Gaul had assigned them. When they go to turn it in, she pretends she co-wrote the essay. Dr. Gaul drops the essay into a cage with genetically modified snakes. She forces Clemensia to reach into the cage to retrieve the pages and is bitten by the snakes. She is envenomated and rushed to the hospital where she remains in critical condition for several days. When Coriolanus is hospitalized, she lurks over his bed and it is shown she is extremely pale, her chest is covered in scales and has severe mental alteration. Her family and friends are lied to about what happened to her and told she caught a contagious virus. She is eventually discharged and her scars are fading, though painfully, and her mental state improved slightly. She developed a phobia of snakes. She is originally angry at Coriolanus for not visiting her, but eventually forgives him. In the film adaptation, Clemensia is not seen after being bitten by the snakes, with Michael Lesslie stating it was fatal.
- Arachne Crane was a mentor in the 10th Hunger Games. She began taunting her District 10 tribute, Brandy, by offering her a sandwich through the bars of the zoo cage, only to then withdraw it. Brandy eventually grabbed her and slit her throat with the knife she used to cut the food. She bled out in Coriolanus Snow's arms. During her funeral procession, her tribute's lifeless body was hanged from a crane and attached to a truck that carried the (shackled) remaining tributes. She is most likely an indirect relative of Seneca Crane.
- Livia Cardew was a mentor in the 10th Hunger Games. Her assigned tribute was the District 1 male, Facet. After Facet died in the arena bombing, she attempted to be given Clemensia Dovecote's tribute, Reaper, arguing that he did not have a mentor as Clemensia was in the hospital at that time. It is heavily implied that Livia ended up marrying Coriolanus Snow in the future, as he stated that he hoped to one day marry someone he disliked so much that he would not feel guilt over manipulating them, naming Livia as "perfect". She is likely an indirect relative of Fulvia Cardew.
- Palmyra Monty was a mentor in the 10th Hunger Games. Her assigned tribute was the District 1 female, Velvereen.
- Florus Friend was a mentor in the 10th Hunger Games. His assigned tribute was the District 2 female, Sabyn.
- Io Jasper was a mentor in the 10th Hunger Games. Her assigned tribute was the District 3 male, Circ. Her parents were scientists, and Coriolanus stated that she "seemed to have been born with a microscope attached to her eye".
- Urban Canville was a mentor in the 10th Hunger Games. His assigned tribute was the District 3 female, Teslee. He was said to be short-tempered, reacting in anger when Lucky Flickerman forgot his name and nearly snarling in contempt at Lepidus Malmsey after his elimination from the Games.
- Persephone Price was a mentor in the 10th Hunger Games. Her assigned tribute was the District 4 male, Mizzen. Her father was railroad tycoon Nero Price.
- Festus Creed was a mentor in the 10th Hunger Games. His assigned tribute was the District 4 female, Coral.
- Dennis Fling was a mentor in the 10th Hunger Games. His assigned tribute was the District 5 male, Hy.
- Iphigenia Moss was a mentor in the 10th Hunger Games. Her assigned tribute was the District 5 female, Sol.
- Apollo Ring was a mentor in the 10th Hunger Games. His assigned tribute was the District 6 male, Otto. His twin sister was Diana, both of whom were killed in the bombing of the Capitol Arena.
- Diana Ring was a mentor in the 10th Hunger Games. Her assigned tribute was the District 6 female, Ginnee. Her twin brother was Apollo, both of whom were killed in the bombing of the Capitol Arena.
- Vipsania Sickle was a mentor in the 10th Hunger Games. Her assigned tribute was the District 7 male, Treech. Her aunt was Agrippina Sickle, and she is likely related to Drusilla Sickle.
- Pliny Harrington was a mentor in the 10th Hunger Games. Nicknamed "Pup" to distinguish himself from his father who was an admiral in the Panem Navy, his assigned tribute was the District 7 female, Lamina.
- Juno Phipps was a mentor in the 10th Hunger Games. Her assigned tribute was the District 8 male, Bobbin.
- Hilarius Heavensbee was a mentor in the 10th Hunger Games. His assigned tribute was the District 8 female, Wovey. He is related to Plutarch Heavensbee.
- Gaius Breen was a mentor in the 10th Hunger Games. His assigned tribute was the District 9 male, Panlo.
- Androcles Anderson was a mentor in the 10th Hunger Games. His assigned tribute was the District 9 female, Sheaf.
- Domitia Whimsiwick was a mentor in the 10th Hunger Games. Her assigned tribute was the District 10 male, Tanner.
- Felix Ravinstill was a mentor in the 10th Hunger Games. His assigned tribute was the District 11 female, Dill. He was then-President Maximinius Ravinstill's grandnephew. In the films, he is the President's son and died due to injuries sustained in the bombing of the Capitol Arena.
- Lysistrata Vickers was a mentor in the 10th Hunger Games. Her assigned tribute was the District 12 male, Jessup Diggs.
- Fulvia Cardew is Plutarch Heavensbee's assistant who defects from the Capitol to join the Second Rebellion. Gale notes that she is "so well intended, yet so insulting". She proposes that Katniss would become the center of the propos by reading out speeches written by her, which Katniss vehemently rejects because she does not want to become anyone other than herself. Later, Fulvia suggests for a propo about the fallen tributes with Finnick narrating; this time, her idea is green-lit. Fulvia survives the Second Rebellion and continues to assist Plutarch. She is likely an indirect relative of Livia Cardew. In the films, Fulvia does not appear, her role instead being taken by Effie.
- Lucky Flickerman was the host for the 10th Hunger Games. This was the first time there was a host to interview the tributes and provide commentary during the Games. He made no effort to remember the tribute's and mentor's names and eventually resorted to magic tricks and showing off his pet parrot to entertain the viewers. He is most likely an ancestor of Caesar Flickerman.
- Crassus Xanthos Snow is Coriolanus Snow's father. He died during the First Rebellion. He co-created the idea of the Hunger Games with his former friend Casca Highbottom as part of a university assignment, submitting a thought experiment of Casca's as an actual societal plan.
- The Grandma'am is Coriolanus and Tigris Snow's paternal grandmother. She took care of her grandchildren after they were orphaned. She is extremely patriotic and holds extreme disdain towards the districts and its citizens. She keeps a rose garden in the roof of the Snow's apartment building.
- Pluribus and Cyrus Bell were the owners of a nightclub in The Capitol. Sometime prior to the 10th Hunger Games, Cyrus was killed in a bombing and Pluribus closed their nightclub in favor of becoming a black marketeer. Bell later lent Coriolanus Snow one of his guitars to give to Lucy Gray Baird.
- Satyria Click was a communications professor at the Academy during the 10th Hunger Games.
- Crispus Demigloss was a history professor at the Academy during the 10th Hunger Games.
- Hippocrata Lunt was a counselor at the Academy during the 10th Hunger Games.
- Agrippina Sickle was the gymnasium mistress at the Academy during the 10th Hunger Games. Her niece was Vipsania Sickle, and she is likely related to Drusilla Sickle.
- Remus Dolittle was a Gamemaker-in-Training and the downstairs neighbor of the Snow family.
- Dr. Kay was a scientist who worked in the Citadel and was the head of the original jabberjay project.
- Dr. Wane was a doctor who worked at the Capitol Hospital and took care of Coriolanus Snow and Clemensia Dovecote while admitted there.
- Lepidus Malmsey was a reporter for Capitol News during the 10th Hunger Games.
- Pontius and Venus were two children who visited Lucy Gray Baird while she was in the Capitol Zoo.
- Nero Price was a railroad tycoon and the father of 10th Hunger Games mentor Persephone Price. During the Dark Days, in which many families fell upon hard times, Coriolanus and Tigris witnessed Nero chopping off a maid's leg for food.
- Fabricia Whatnot was a fashion designer and Tigris Snow's boss.
- Maximinius Ravinstill was the President of Panem at the time of the 10th Hunger Games. His grand-nephew was Felix Ravinstill.
- Drusilla Sickle is a Capitol chaperone for the District 12 tributes during the 50th Hunger Games. She is married to Magno Stift, the stylist for the District 12 tributes during the 50th Hunger Games. She is likely indirectly related to Agrippina and Vipsania Sickle. Drusilla was shown to have a far more dismissive and even aggressive attitude towards the District 12 tributes through forcing Haymitch to compete in the 50th Hunger Games despite not being reaped and going so far as to physically assault Maysilee following an argument with her. After falling down an escalator and breaking her hip before the Victory Tour, Drusilla is replaced by Effie Trinket.
- Incitatus Loomy was the parade master for the 50th Hunger Games. Due to the accident in the parade, he was forced to eat poisoned oysters by Snow.
- Magno Stift was the stylist assigned to District 12 for the 50th Hunger Games. He had little taste in style and had an unnatural obsession with reptiles, something that often got him in trouble. He was married to Drusilla Sickle.
- Proserpina Trinket was a student at Capitol University assigned to Haymitch Abernathy's prep team for the 50th Hunger Games. She was the younger sister of Effie Trinket.
- Vitus was a student at Capitol University assigned to Haymitch Abernathy's prep team alongside Proserpina Trinket.

== District 2 ==
- Sejanus Plinth is a mentor during the 10th Hunger Games and the best friend of Coriolanus Snow. He is idealistic and fundamentally opposes the Capitol's treatment of the districts and the existence of the Hunger Games. His rebellious nature lands him in trouble at the Academy and his father negotiates for Sejanus to become a Peacekeeper in District 12. There, he is reunited with Coriolanus and begins helping the rebels. Coriolanus records him talking about breaking out an imprisoned rebel and helping several of them escape to the north. This leads to him being arrested and hanged for treason which Coriolanus had not anticipated happening, having thought that Sejanus's father would buy his way out of trouble again.
- Strabo Plinth is Sejanus's father. He has a munitions empire in District 2 and sided with the Capitol during the war. This granted him considerable wealth and political favor, allowing him to relocate his family to the Capitol, though they are never truly accepted there. He is frustrated with his son's idealism and constantly uses his influences to both force him into doing his bidding and bail him out of trouble. After his son's death, he essentially adopts Coriolanus Snow, provides for him and his family, and names him his heir.
- Mrs. Plinth, also referred to as Ma Plinth is Sejanus's mother and Strabo's wife. She is an excellent cook and often sends her son and Coriolanus treats during their time as Peacekeepers in District 12. She misses her life in District 2 and is saddened by the fact they are considered traitors and most of her family has disowned her. After Strabo named Snow his heir, she moved with her husband to the apartment below the Snows and helped Tigris take care of the Grandma'am.

== District 8 ==
- Commander Paylor first appears in Mockingjay. Paylor is described as having dark brown eyes that are puffy with fatigue, and she smells of metal and sweat. Paylor is the leader of the rebel troops in District 8. Katniss meets her while in District 8 to film a propo. Later in Mockingjay, while wandering around President Snow's now rebel-inhabited mansion, Paylor allows Katniss to see President Snow, who is now imprisoned and awaiting execution. Two days after Katniss kills Coin, Paylor becomes President of Panem. It is implied that living conditions in all the districts improved considerably under her presidency.
- Bonnie and Twill meet Katniss in the woods during Catching Fire. Both are from District 8 and are rebels. Twill proves this by holding out a cracker with the image of a mockingjay; in the book, it is the first time Katniss sees that the mockingjay has become a symbol of rebellion. Bonnie and Twill are on their way to District 13, and are the first to tell Katniss that District 13 may exist. Katniss also begins to ponder the reality of District 13, when she realizes that they show the same footage of the burned-down justice building again and again, each time implying it is current footage. However, in Mockingjay, it is mentioned the pair never made it to 13, and they are presumed dead. Bonnie and Twill are not featured in the films.
- Eddy is a boy who is hospitalized along with his sister in District 8 by the time Katniss arrives there to film a propo. He seems to idolize Katniss with how he tries to come close to see her. He and his sister presumably perish when the Capitol bombs the hospital they are in.

== District 12 ==
=== Asterid Everdeen (née March) ===
Katniss's mother, Asterid Everdeen, has fair skin, blonde hair, and blue eyes, which symbolize that she is not from the Seam. She was raised in town as the daughter of an apothecary and consequently had a fairly comfortable life. During the 50th Hunger Games (2nd Quarter Quell) Reaping, she and Madge's mother were clinging on Maysilee Donner, Madge's aunt, and Ms. Everdeen's friend, who was reaped and killed at the time. She gave it all up to marry Katniss's father and move to the Seam, where she lived in poverty. After her husband Burdock died in a mining accident, she fell into a deep depression and did not speak for a long time, neglecting her daughters and forcing Katniss to become Prim's primary parent figure. Asterid eventually recovered enough to set up an apothecary in District 12, but it was not until after Katniss's first Hunger Games that she finally forgave her mother for not offering any support to her and Prim during her depression. In Mockingjay, Asterid is seen working in the hospital in District 13, and following Prim's death at the end of the book, she does not return to District 12 with Katniss. Instead, she stays in District 4, working in a hospital and coping with her grief. She and Katniss maintain contact through telephone calls.

She appears in Sunrise on the Reaping which gives her name as Asterid Everdeen, originally Asterid March. She and her husband were friends of Haymitch's before his games. After the murder of his family and girlfriend, Haymitch pushed everyone away to protect them with the Everdeens being two of the last to give up on him.

=== Burdock Everdeen ===
Katniss's father, Burdock Everdeen, died in the District 12 mines with Gale's father, when Katniss was 11 and Prim was 7. Memories of him run through Katniss's mind throughout the series, with Katniss mentioning his singing voice, his handsomeness, and the things he taught her. Peeta's father says that although he was in love with Katniss's mother, she chose to marry Katniss's father because of his lovely singing voice. Katniss recalls that when her father sang, "all the birds stopped to listen" (this is one of the memories that Peeta responds successfully to). Katniss misses her father terribly, and the pain of losing him almost destroyed his wife, Asterid. He is depicted through flashbacks in the films.

He appears in Sunrise on the Reaping which reveals that his name is Burdock and he was a childhood friend of Haymitch Abernathy's. He is also related to the Covey and a distant cousin of Lenore Dove Baird. Burdock introduced Haymitch to the love of his life, Lenore Dove, who was Burdock's cousin. After the murder of his family and Lenore Dove following the 50th Hunger Games, Haymitch pushed away all of his friends in order to protect them with Burdock being one of the last ones to give up on him. Burdock later helped Haymitch to find the Covey's secret graveyard and Lenore Dove's grave.

=== Madge Undersee ===
Madge Undersee is the mayor's daughter and Katniss's friend. She is not included in the film adaptations. She is described as having blonde hair and blue eyes, similar to the other merchant kids such as Peeta and Delly Cartwright. She and Katniss were always thrown together at school in the books, as both were solitary in nature. Madge gives Katniss her mockingjay pin, which becomes a symbol of rebellion. After Katniss volunteers in place of her sister, Madge visits Katniss in the Hall of Justice and insists that she wears the pin for the games. In the film, Katniss obtains the pin at the market from Greasy Sae, who lets her take it free of charge. Katniss later learns the pin belonged to Maysilee Donner, a tribute in the 50th Hunger Games, and Madge's aunt, who was also friends with Katniss's mother, who became Haymitch's ally and was killed by candy-pink birds with spear beaks. Katniss and Madge spend more time together during the months after the Games. Katniss finds out that Madge does not see her parents often; her father has to run District 12 and her mother suffers from severe headaches that cause her to stay in bed. Katniss and Madge frequently went over to each other's houses, particularly during Catching Fire. Madge tried to teach Katniss to play the piano, but Katniss preferred to listen to her play. Madge wanted to go out into the woods to hunt, so Katniss took her and showed her how to shoot. Katniss is at Madge's house when she first hears of the uprisings in District 8 on the mayor's television in his room. Madge and her family perish in the District 12 bombings, and Katniss is very sorrowful at Madge's death and recalls how brave and kind she was.

=== Delly Cartwright ===
Delly Cartwright is a girl from District 12 whom Katniss describes as being "the friendliest person on the planet". Delly is Peeta's friend and became one of the refugees in District 13, after escaping the District 12 fire bombing with her younger brother. Her parents, who hid in the shoe shop during the bombing, were not so lucky, as Katniss describes. Delly is first mentioned in The Hunger Games, when Peeta, trying to explain Katniss's reaction upon recognizing an Avox as someone she met on a hunting trip, lies and says that the Avox is a "dead ringer for Delly". In Mockingjay, after Peeta is rescued from the Capitol, Delly is used as a psychological "balm" to stir his childhood memories and help begin his recovery from the mind-control tortures the Capitol inflicted upon him. In the same book, it was revealed that Delly and Peeta used to create chalk drawings on paving stones, and Peeta's father used to let them make dough people. Delly does not appear in the film series, her role instead being taken by Prim.

=== Greasy Sae ===
Greasy Sae is an old woman who sells bowls of soup from a large kettle at The Hob in District 12. Katniss Everdeen and Gale Hawthorne trade with her often, and make a conscious effort to remain on good terms with her, as she could be counted on to buy wild dogs, which most of their other customers decline. Greasy Sae started a collection to sponsor Peeta and Katniss during the 74th Hunger Games, and some people chipped in. She has a granddaughter described as "not quite right" (this probably refers to her having a mental disorder) who is generally treated as a pet by people in The Hob, who give her scraps of food from their stands. At the end of the book, Greasy Sae is one of the few hundred people to return to District 12 following the war, both Greasy Sae and her granddaughter survived the bombing of District 12. When Katniss returns to District 12 after the war, Greasy Sae comes over in the morning and evening to cook and do light housekeeping. It is unclear whether she is doing this out of friendship or if she has been paid. Her granddaughter can be seen fiddling with a ball of yarn. Greasy Sae is not directly mentioned in the Hunger Games films, but is a character who is presumably seen dealing with Katniss; she gives the Mockingjay pin to Katniss in the film although in the book Madge gave Katniss the pin.

=== Buttercup ===
Buttercup is Prim's cat. He is Prim's companion and is loyal only to her, maintaining a years-long mutual dislike with Katniss. Prim cherishes Buttercup, while Katniss finds him to be "the world's ugliest cat." In the early chapters of The Hunger Games, Katniss states the only love they shared for each other were the leftover entrails of her food and less hissing from Buttercup.

Katniss was at first hesitant to let Prim keep the cat, but Prim begged, "even cried" to let her keep him. Katniss initially tried to drown Buttercup but later, when she is on the way to the Capitol, states that she is glad she did not as he would have been a source of comfort to Prim. Initially missing in the chaos after the Capitol's air force bombed District 12, Buttercup survived among the ruins until Katniss visited and brought him back with her to 13. He is said to dislike District 13, due to its underground location and lack of fresh air. After Prim's death and the end of the war, he makes his way back to District 12 on foot and is found again by Katniss. The two mourn Prim's death in Mockingjay and end up comforting each other, burying their lengthy feud as Buttercup takes to guarding Katniss at night.

Buttercup has black and white fur in the first film (contrary to his name), but in later films better fits the books' description of him.

=== Lenore Dove Baird ===
Lenore Dove Baird was a member of the Covey and Haymitch Abernathy's girlfriend. Her mother (possibly Maude Ivory Baird) died in childbirth and her father's identity was unknown, so she was raised by her uncles, Tam Amber and Clerk Carmine. Despite a sheltered upbringing, Lenore Dove possessed a fiery, unbidden spirit and frequently acted out against the Capitol. After Haymitch was reaped, a distraught Lenore Dove publicly performed songs that Peacekeepers had forbidden her to sing as an act of retribution, resulting in her arrest. Her uncles were able to get the Peacekeepers to release her on house arrest, after which she reunited with Haymitch. He fed her a gumdrop, oblivious to the fact that President Snow had laced it with poison in order to punish him for his rebellion against the Capitol. As Lenore Dove died in his arms, she made him promise not to let the sun rise on the reaping. Following her death, Haymitch became an alcoholic and cut off all his friends in fear that the Capitol would kill them too.

Like the rest of the Covey members, Lenore Dove got her name from a poem and a color. The first half of her name, Lenore, was drawn from Edgar Allan Poe's poem The Raven, and the second half of her name was drawn from the color dove.

=== Minor District 12 characters ===
- Hazelle Hawthorne is Gale's mother. A very self-reliant woman, after her husband is killed in the same mining accident that killed Katniss's father, she takes up work doing people's laundry. In the book, after Gale is caught poaching and is publicly whipped, people stop using Hazelle's services for fear of being punished for associating with her. She gets a new job cleaning Haymitch's house sometime after that.
- Rory, Vick, and Posy Hawthorne are Gale's younger siblings. The book states Rory is 12, Vick is 10, and Posy is 5. Posy was born after the mining accident that killed Gale and Katniss's fathers. After Thread's lockdown, Posy got sick, and Rory received tesserae in exchange for his name to be entered more times in the Reaping. Hazelle, Rory, Vick, and Posy all escape the District 12 bombings. In the final book, Posy cheers up Octavia, saying that she would be pretty in any color.
- Otho Mellark is Peeta's father. He owns a bakery. Kind and soft-spoken, he resembles his son. He does not appear except when he trades with Katniss and Gale, and when he visits Katniss before the 74th Hunger Games to give her cookies. It is later revealed that he grew up with Katniss's mother, Asterid, and even loved her. In Mockingjay, it is revealed that he used to let Peeta and Delly Cartwright make dough girls and boys. Otho and his wife die in the District 12 bombings.
- Mrs. Mellark is Peeta's mother. Very stern and strict, she only appears in the series once, when she beats Peeta. Peeta mentions that he likes his father more than his mother. Katniss calls her a "witch" on several occasions and hints that Otho only married her because he could not have Asterid March, Katniss's eventual mother. Mrs. Mellark dies in the District 12 bombings.
- Cray is the Head Peacekeeper of District 12. As such Cray does not enforce many of the laws of the Capitol. He is often found in The Hob, District 12's black market, where he buys illegal alcohol and game from Gale and Katniss. Although lenient with the law, he is also known to abuse his position by luring starving young women into his bed in exchange for a small amount of money. He disappears abruptly the day Thread comes to take his place and there is no further word of his fate. In the film he is seen stepping out to greet Thread right before having a bag placed over his head and being taken away by Peacekeepers, suggesting he met a bad end.
- Romulus Thread is Cray's replacement as Head Peacekeeper of District 12. He is extremely cruel, intimidating and sadistic. When the mayor decided to greet him, Thread, instead, moved to detain him. His only appearance is in Catching Fire at Gale Hawthorne's whipping for the crime of poaching off the Capitol's land. In the film, Gale is instead whipped because he tackled Thread, who was about to beat a defiant bystander. Thread makes major changes to District 12 by adding new gallows, stocks, and a whipping post, as well as enforcing curfew. He also has The Hob (District 12's black market) pillaged and burned down.
- Mayor Undersee is Madge Undersee's father as well as District 12's mayor. He enjoys the strawberries that Katniss Everdeen and Gale Hawthorne pick illegally from the woods. He was present at the Reaping in The Hunger Games. He is also mentioned as throwing a Harvest Festival party in District 12 in Catching Fire. He dies in the District 12 bombing.
- Goat Man is an old man who raises goats for a living. In The Hunger Games, Katniss recalls him as the man who sells Katniss and Gale a goat. Later, the goat is given to Primrose and named Lady. Goat Man is said to have died during the initial bombing of District 12.
- Rooba is the District 12 butcher. She helps Katniss by refusing the Goat Man's offer, thus letting Katniss have the goat for a lower price. She is also known to buy meat (such as rabbits and deer) from Katniss and Gale. She dies in the District 12 bombing.
- Ripper is a seller of white liquor in the Hob market of District 12. Peeta threatens to report her to the Peacekeepers if she continues to sell liquor to Katniss and Haymitch, who drink together after the twist for the Third Quarter Quell is revealed. She presumably dies during the District 12 bombings, as she is not mentioned among the 10% of the population who manage to reach District 13.
- Lady is a nanny goat owned by Prim, who usually milks it before going to school every day. Lady was not brought to District 13 (and neither was Buttercup) during the evacuation. Her fate is not confirmed, but Katniss did not see her anywhere when she visited District 12 after the bombings.
- Mrs. Merrilee Undersee (nee Donner) is Mayor Undersee's wife, Madge's mother, and Maysilee Donner's twin sister. She is said to have been in a very deep depression, partially brought on by her sister's death. She is described as staying in bed all day, shutting away reality. She takes pills to calm her pain, which does not seem to work. She perishes along with her daughter, husband, and two other people in the District 12 bombings.
- Darius is a friendly Peacekeeper who became an Avox because he interfered with Gale's public whipping. He is Katniss's Avox servant for the Quarter Quell, along with Lavinia. Because of this, he was arrested with Lavinia, questioned about Katniss, tortured, and eventually killed. Peeta mentioned in Mockingjay that while Lavinia died relatively quickly (if accidentally), it took days to finish Darius off. As Avoxes cannot speak, it can be assumed the only purpose for questioning them was to torture Peeta by making him listen. Darius does not appear in the film series.
- Leevy is Katniss's neighbor, who makes her first appearance in Catching Fire. She offers to help after Gale's whipping, and Katniss tells her to go to the Hawthorne house. She survived the bombing of District 12. She is shown in District 13 in Mockingjay as being cautious of Katniss's prep team, but still gives them a greeting. She is supportive of Katniss, and she tells Haymitch that she was inspired by Katniss's drive when she volunteered for Prim at the Reaping. It can be assumed that she survived the rebellion, and most likely returned to District 12. She is described as being from the Seam, so she likely has dark hair and gray eyes, and is likely the same age as Katniss. When Leevy goes to get Hazelle Hawthorne after Gale's whipping, Katniss reminds her to leave Rory, Vick, and Posy at their house so that they could not see the pain that their older brother was in.
- Mayfair Lipp was the daughter of District 12's Mayor Lipp, the girlfriend of Billy Taupe Clade, and the rival of Lucy Gray Baird. She was the direct cause of Lucy Gray's reaping into the Games, having convinced her father to call out her name after discovering that Billy Taupe was dating them both at the same time. She was shot and killed by Coriolanus Snow towards the end of the story.
- Mayor Lipp was the mayor of District 12 at the time of the 10th Hunger Games, as well as the father of Mayfair Lipp.
- Arlo Chance was a coal miner and rebel who was executed by hanging after the war, inspiring Lucy Gray Baird to write "The Hanging Tree".
- Lil was the probable lover of Arlo Chance who was told to run by Arlo just before his execution. Her brother, Spruce, later attempted to break her out of the Peacekeepers' base, but she was caught and executed.
- Spruce was the brother of Lil who attempted to break her free from the Peacekeepers' base, later killing Billy Taupe Clade. He was captured and executed alongside his sister and Sejanus Plinth.
- Maude Ivory is a member of the Covey and Lucy Gray's cousin. It is said she never forgets a tune, even after only hearing it once. Maude Ivory briefly appears in both the book and movie adaption of The Hunger Games: The Ballad of Songbirds & Snakes. She died sometime in the forty years that followed with Haymitch Abernathy finding Maude Ivory's grave while looking for Lenore Dove's.
- Barb Azure Baird is a member of The Covey who played the bass in their performances. Her cousin is Lucy Gray Baird.
- Billy Taupe Clade is a member of The Covey who played the accordion in their performances. The older brother of Clerk Carmine Clade and the lover of Lucy Gray Baird, he caused Lucy Gray's reaping into the Games after having an affair with Mayfair Lipp, resulting in Mayfair asking her father, the mayor, to call out Lucy Gray's name at the reaping. Lucy Gray wrote the song "The Ballad of Lucy Gray Baird" in response to Billy Taupe's actions. Exiled from The Covey, Billy Taupe was shot and killed by Spruce near the end of the story.
- Clerk Carmine Clade is a member of The Covey who plays the fiddle in their performances. He is Billy Taupe Clade's younger brother and Lenore Dove Baird's uncle. At the time of Sunrise on the Reaping, he had been dating a man for over 30 years, keeping their relationship quiet for fear of discrimination.
- Tam Amber is a member of The Covey that plays the mandolin in their performances. He is additionally a sought-after blacksmith. Tam Amber's niece is Lenore Dove Baird, who commissioned him to create a flint starter for Haymitch's birthday, which later became his tribute token. He's also the creator of the Mockingjay pin.
- Shamus is a goat owned by The Covey.
- Bug, Junius, and Smiley were three men who befriended Coriolanus Snow after enlisting as Peacekeepers in District 12. Bug was originally from District 11, Junius from the Capitol, and Smiley from District 8.
- Cookie was a Peacekeeper who worked as a cook in District 12 and was assigned as Coriolanus Snow's overseer while working in kitchen detail.
- Commander Hoff was the leader of District 12's Peacekeepers at the time of the 10th Hunger Games.
- Willamae Abernathy was Haymitch Abernathy's mother. She was a dignified and hardworking woman but showed immense love for her family. She was widowed young after her husband died in a coal mine fire, leaving her to raise Haymitch and his younger brother, Sid, alone. Prior to this, she had given birth to two stillborn daughters. She and Sid were burned alive by the Capitol in order to punish Haymitch for his acts of rebellion.
- Sid Abernathy was Haymitch Abernathy's 10-year-old brother. He and his mother were killed after their house was set on fire by the Capitol to punish Haymitch. After the fire, their bodies were found holding on to each other, and the mourners decided not to separate them, instead burying them in a single coffin.

== District 13 ==
=== President Coin ===
President Alma Coin is the leader of District 13. She is described as having gray hair that falls in an unbroken sheet to her shoulders and gray eyes that look like "all the color was sucked away" and "slush that you wish would melt away". She has a special dislike of Katniss and mentions that Katniss is more useful to her dead than alive. It is also revealed that she wanted Peeta rescued from the Third Quarter Quell, not Katniss.

During the assault on the Capitol, Coin deliberately places Peeta in Katniss's squad to endanger Katniss's life, which Snow had warned about for he and Coin had been political rivals. After taking over the Capitol, Coin becomes the "interim" president of Panem and proposes a final Hunger Games with the Capitol children as tributes.

During an encounter, Snow reveals the truth about Coin's actions to Katniss and explains that Coin had always intended to pit the Capitol and the districts against each other and then swoop in to seize power in replacement of Snow once the war was over. After Snow reminds Katniss of their promise to never lie to each other and recalling Coin's various actions, Katniss realizes that Snow is right about Coin. Coin had orchestrated the death of her sister Prim and many other children solely to secure victory in the war and to ensure Katniss's loyalty. Given that Katniss would wield significant influence over the selection of Panem's new leader after the war, her tolerance for Coin was minimal at best. As a result, instead of killing President Snow at his public execution, Katniss shoots and kills Coin and is arrested for her assassination. Although put on trial for Coin's murder, Katniss is ultimately exonerated due to her poor mental state at the time with the help of Plutarch Heavensbee and Dr. Aurelius.

=== Boggs ===
Boggs is first introduced as President Coin's right-hand man, holding the rank of colonel in District 13's military. At first, Katniss writes him off as someone she will dislike due to his close association with Coin. However, he is shown to be honest, witty, and friendly, and Katniss learns to trust him. He serves as Katniss's bodyguard for part of Mockingjay and is assigned to Squad 451 along with Katniss, Gale, and Finnick. Boggs knew one way or another that Coin did not want or expect for Katniss to come back from the battle to take the Capitol alive, but privately tells her he will not let this come to pass, intending for Katniss to have a long life. When Katniss asks why, Boggs answers "Because you've earned it."

Not long after that conversation with Katniss, Boggs falls victim to a Capitol land mine that his Holo failed to detect, losing both his legs in the blast. The squad drags him into an apartment, where he gives Katniss his Holo and tells her to complete her "mission", to not trust "them" (whom this is referring to is unclear), and to kill Peeta. He dies soon afterward.

=== Minor District 13 characters ===
- Leeg 1 and Leeg 2 are sisters who were born in District 13 and placed in the sharpshooting Star Squad to assist Katniss in her final mission. They are said to look almost completely alike. Since everyone is addressed as "Soldier", they are distinguished by 1 and 2. Four days after arriving in the Capitol, Leeg 2 is the first to be killed in the Star Squad. She dies after a metal dart, shot out of an incorrectly labelled pod, hits her in the temple. Leeg 1 continues through to the Capitol's underground until she is killed when Katniss discovers that Leeg 1 and Jackson chose to stay at a pod called the Meat Grinder, to hold back the lizard mutations. In the films, their deaths are modified; the two die together after Leeg 1 chooses to stay with Leeg 2, who is injured in a landmine trap, as the building they are in is destroyed by the Peacekeepers.
- Mitchell, Jackson, and Homes are part of Katniss's sharpshooting team, the Star Squad; they are all killed in the war. Mitchell is kicked into a net of barbed wire by a raging Peeta and subsequently killed by a black tar-like substance. Jackson, second in command after Boggs in the Star Squad, stays behind to hold back the wolf mutations, along with Leeg 1, presumably resulting in their deaths. Homes is presumed to have been decapitated by the lizard mutations, along with Finnick and Castor.
- Dr. Aurelius is a doctor from District 13. He takes care of Katniss during her time in District 13 and heads the study on Peeta's hijacking. He is also Katniss's doctor/therapist after Prim's death (however, he generally sleeps during their sessions unless she feels like talking, which suits them both). He serves as a witness in Katniss's defense during her trial for the killing of Coin and states Katniss is mentally unstable, resulting in her exoneration. After the war, Katniss continues her sessions with Dr. Aurelius by telephone. Dr. Aurelius does not appear in the film series.
- Dalton is a man from District 10 who made it to District 13 on foot years before the series takes place. He makes his first appearance in Mockingjay in District 13. He conducts Annie and Finnick's wedding because it was close to the ceremony that is in his district.
