= Ben Wang =

American actor (born 1997)

- 王璞存
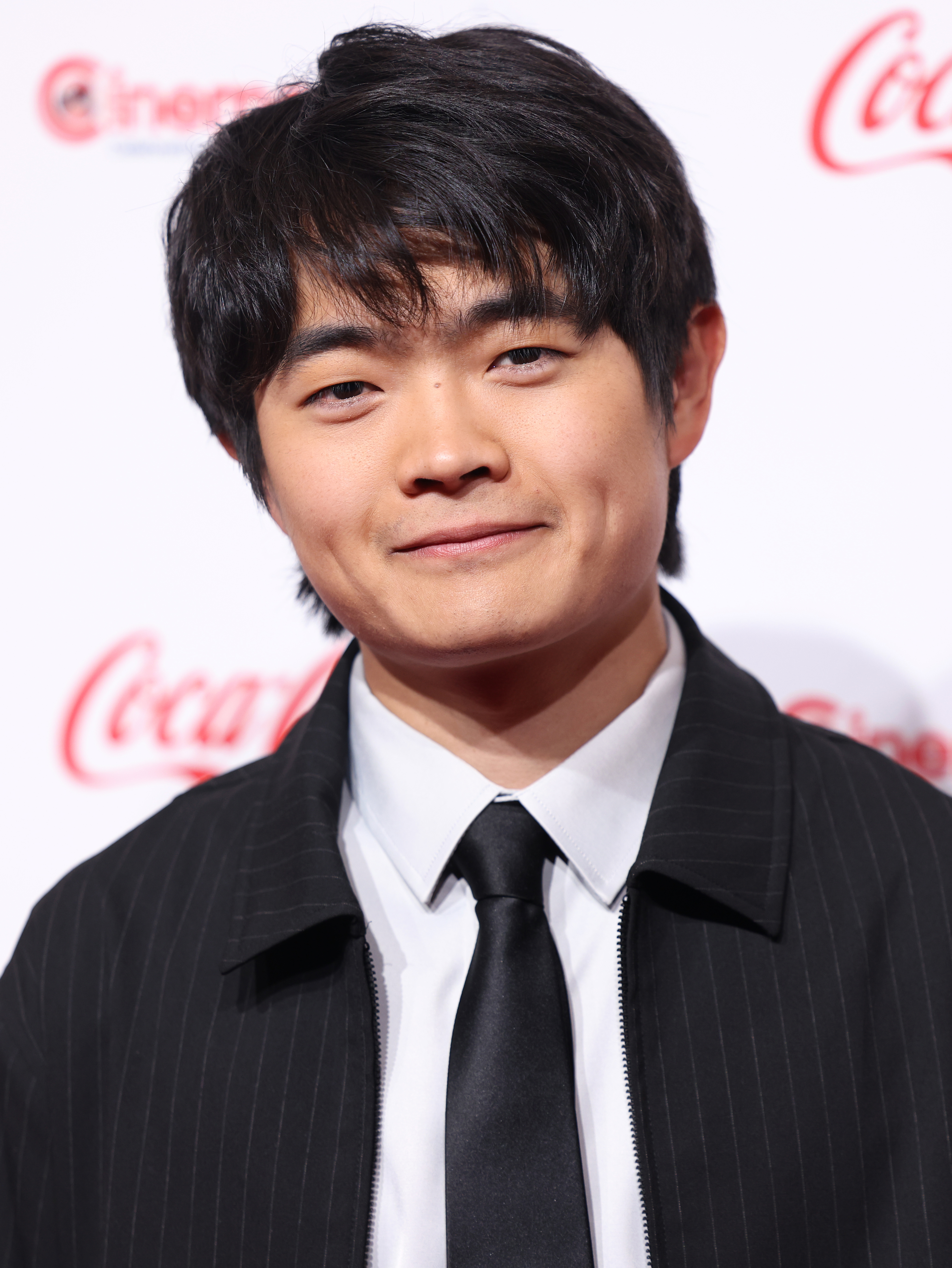
- Wang in 2025
- Born: Wang Pucun; September 21, 1997 (age 29); Beijing, China
- Citizenship: United States
- Education: New York University
- Occupation: Actor
- Years active: 2021–present

Chinese name
- Chinese: 王璞存
Transcriptions
Standard Mandarin
- Hanyu Pinyin: Wáng Púcún

other Chinese name
- Chinese: 王班
Transcriptions
Standard Mandarin
- Hanyu Pinyin: Wáng Bān

Wang Pucun (Chinese: 王璞存; pinyin: Wáng Púcún; born September 21, 1997), known professionally as Ben Wang (Chinese: 王班; pinyin: Wáng Bān), is an American actor. He is known for his role as Jin Wang in Disney+ series American Born Chinese and as Bo in Chang Can Dunk.

== Early life, family and education ==
Wang was born in Beijing, China. His parents divorced when he was four years old which led to him and his mother immigrating to the United States when he was six. Wang alternated between living with his mother and his grandparents throughout his childhood in Northfield, Minnesota. He graduated from Northfield High School in 2016. Wang studied musical theater at New York University.

== Career ==
Wang's first major role came in an episode of MacGyver in 2021 as Eli Brown. In 2023, he played Bo in the Disney+ film Chang Can Dunk. Wang also landed the lead role in the 2023 Disney+ sitcom American Born Chinese. Based on the graphic novel of the same name by Gene Luen Yang, he played the role of high school student Jin Wang.

In February 2024, it was announced that Wang would play the lead role of Li Fong in Karate Kid: Legends alongside Ralph Macchio and Jackie Chan. The movie was released in 2025. That same year, Wang starred in the film The Long Walk.

Ben Wang plays Wyatt Callow in the 2026 prequel film The Hunger Games: Sunrise on the Reaping. Wyatt, a tribute from District 12, is described as a contradictory, big-hearted, pragmatic character who enters the arena alongside young Haymitch Abernathy (played by Joseph Zada).

== Awards ==
Wang was honored with the Star of Tomorrow award at the CinemaCon 2025 Big Screen Achievement Awards ahead of the release of Karate Kid: Legends.

== Personal life ==
Wang is fluent in English and Mandarin Chinese. He is also proficient in martial arts such as karate, kenpo, kung fu (primarily wing chun), kumdo and taekwondo.

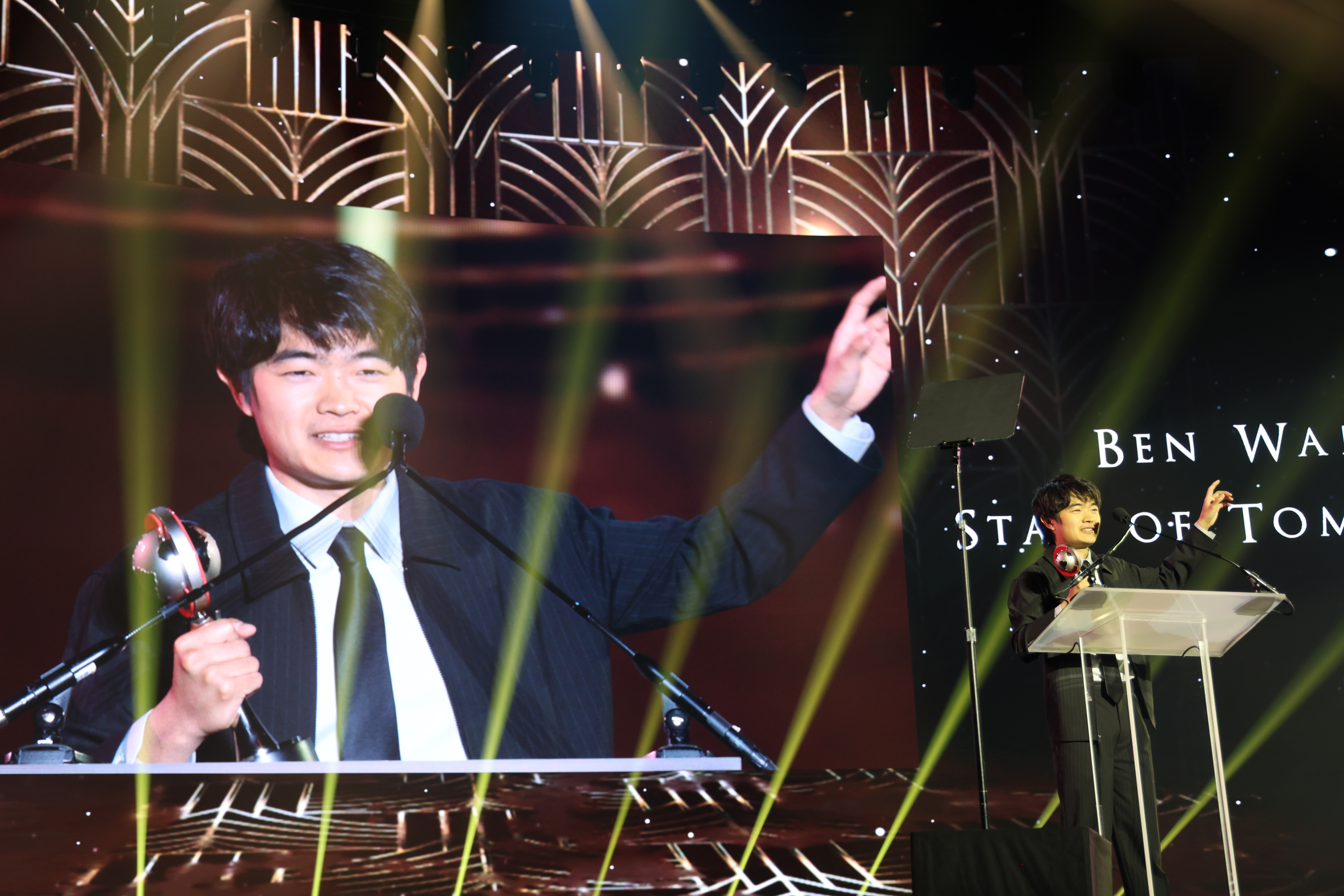
Wang at CinemaCon, 2025

== Filmography ==
=== Film ===
Key
†	Denotes films that have not yet been released

Year	Title	Role	Notes
2022	Sex Appeal	Franklin	
2023	Chang Can Dunk	Bo	
2023	Sight	Young Ming	
2023	Good Egg	Guy	
2024	Mean Girls	Jacob Zheng	
2025	Karate Kid: Legends	Li Fong	
2025	The Long Walk	Hank Olson	
2025	Balloon	Eric Chang	Short film
2026	Gail Daughtry and the Celebrity Sex Pass	Caleb	
2026	Brian	Brian	
2026	The Hunger Games: Sunrise on the Reaping	Wyatt Callow	

=== Television ===
Year	Title	Role	Notes
2021	MacGyver	Eli Brown	Episode: "Banh Bao + Sterno + Drill + Burner + Mason"
2021	Launchpad	Gang	Episode: "Dinner Is Served"
2021	The Last O.G.	Oliver	Episode: "Smush"
2022	Search Party	Intern	Episode: "Acts of the Apostles"
2023	American Born Chinese	Jin Wang	8 episodes
2024	Bob's Burgers	Sam (voice)	2 episodes
