= Jinn (2018 film) =

- Directed by: Nijla Mu'min
- Written by: Nijla Mu'min
- Produced by: Maya Emelle; Arielle Saturne; Avril Speaks
- Starring: Zoe Renee; Simone Missick; Kelvin Harrison Jr. Dorian Missick; Hisham Tawfiq; Kelly Jenrette
- Cinematography: Bruce Francis Cole
- Edited by: Collin Kriner
- Music by: Jesi Nelson
- Production companies: Sweet Potato Pie Productions; Morgan's Mark; Confluential Films
- Distributed by: Orion Classics
- Release dates: March 11, 2018 (SXSW); November 16, 2018
- Running time: 92 minutes
- Country: United States
- Language: English

Jinn is a 2018 American drama film written and directed by Nijla Mu'min. Starring Zoe Renee and Simone Missick, it is a coming-of-age story about a Black Muslim teenage girl, Summer, who converts to Islam at her mother's behest. The film premiered at the 2018 South by Southwest Film Festival on March 11, 2018 and received Special Jury Recognition for Writing.

== Plot ==
Summer is a teenage girl with divorced parents in her last year of high school. Her mother, Jade, a meteorologist, has been secretly attending a mosque and reading the Quran. Finally feeling at peace with her decision to convert she begins to open up about her new faith to Summer, but quickly begins pressuring her to join the Islamic faith as well.

Summer initially thinks her mother's conversion is a joke, spurred on by a crush on the imam. Her father also dismisses it as a fad of her mother's but suggests Summer play along. Summer begins going to the mosque while still living the way she wants in her downtime by drinking, going to parties, and leaving her hair uncovered.

While dancing with her friends Summer posts a picture of herself to Instagram in a bra wearing a hijab with the hashtag halal hottie.

Jade begins to consider changing her name to an Arabic one to better fit her faith and wears her hijab on air. Summer also begins to take the faith more seriously and becomes intrigued by the Muslim idea of jinn. She also befriends Tahir, one of her classmates who attends the same mosque as she does and who shows her what a devote Muslim life could look like. As she concentrates on her faith her halal hottie post goes viral and she is later targeted by the Imam who publicly scolds her for her actions. Summer begins to feel torn as she enjoys certain aspects of the Muslim faith but also the freedom of the secular life she lived before her conversion.

Summer confesses to Tahir that she has a crush on him and despite her flirtatious attitude she has never been intimate with anyone. She and Tahir have sex. They are later caught kissing by Tahir's mother who bans her from their house. Summer runs away from her mother and goes to stay with her father. Tahir's mother contacts Jade about Summer's relationship with Tahir and though she does not discuss her suspicions that Tahir and Summer are having sex, Jade realizes it anyway.

Jade visits Summer at her father's apartment and tells her that as long as she is practicing safe sex and the relationship is consensual she supports her. Jade also decides to loosen her restrictions and to practice her faith in a way more suited to her and her daughter's needs.

Summer learns that she has been accepted to school for dance and, with the support of her parents and the reluctant approval of Tahir's mother, continues her relationship with him.

== Cast ==
- Simone Missick as Jade
- Zoe Renee as Summer
- Hisham Tawfiq as Imam Khalid
- Kelvin Harrison Jr. as Tahir
- Dorian Missick as David
- Kelly Jenrette as Rasheedah
- Ashlei Foushee as Blaine
- Maya Morales as Tati
- Upasana Beharee as Maryam
- Damien D. Smith as Dawud
- Horace Dodd as Jordan
- John Zderko as Myles

== Production ==
Jinn is Nijla Mu'min's debut feature film. The film was inspired by Mu'min's experiences growing up in the Bay Area's Black Muslim community. Mu'min was born into a Muslim family. Her father converted to Islam in the 1960s and her mother converted when they married. Actress Simone Missick also was an executive producer for the film.

=== Release ===
Jinn premiered at 2018 SXSW Film Festival.

== Critical reception ==
Jinn received positive critical reception. On review aggregator Rotten Tomatoes, 91% of 22 reviews are positive, with an average rating of 7.70/10. The website's critics' consensus reads, "A coming-of-age story distinguished by sensitivity and strong performances, Jinn heralds debuting writer-director Nijla Mu'min as a remarkable talent." Metacritic, which uses a weighted average, assigned the film a score of 75 out of 100 based on 9 critics, indicating "generally favorable" reviews. Reviewing for The A.V. Club, Katie Rife stated, "It presents Islam, a religion too often demonized in Western media, as a compassionate faith, and the women who practice it as independent and strong." In a review for Variety, Amy Nicholson wrote, "Jinn” is the rare coming-of-age story that doesn't simply pat kids on the head and tell them they just need to love themselves. Instead, Mu’min holds her characters accountable for the way they discombobulate each other's lives, while giving them the space to do better, if they can figure out what better is." The New York Times selected the film as a Critic's Pick.

== Accolades ==
- Special Jury Recognition for Writing, 2018 SXSW Film Festival (2018)
- Jury Award for Best Screenplay, American Black Film Festival (2018)
