= Sight (2023 film) =

Film by Andrew Hyatt

- Theatrical release poster
- Directed by: Andrew Hyatt
- Written by: Andrew Hyatt; John Duigan; Buzz McLaughlin
- Based on: From Darkness to Sight by Ming Wang
- Produced by: David Fischer; Darren Moorman; Vicki Sotheran
- Starring: Terry Chen; Greg Kinnear; Danni Wang; Raymond Ma; Ben Wang; Jayden Zhang; Wai Ching Ho; Fionnula Flanagan
- Cinematography: Michael Balfry
- Edited by: Dan O'Brien
- Music by: Sean Philip Johnson
- Production companies: Open River Entertainment; Reserve Entertainment
- Distributed by: Angel Studios
- Release dates: October 5, 2023 (Heartland International Film Festival); May 24, 2024 (United States)
- Running time: 101 minutes
- Country: United States
- Languages: English; Mandarin
- Budget: $8.5 million
- Box office: $7.2 million

Sight is a 2023 American biographical drama film directed by Andrew Hyatt, written by Hyatt, John Duigan, and Buzz McLaughlin, and starring Terry Chen and Greg Kinnear. The film is about Ming Wang, a Chinese immigrant to the United States who became a renowned eye surgeon. It is based on Wang's 2016 autobiography From Darkness to Sight. The film premiered on October 5, 2023, at the Heartland International Film Festival, and was released in the United States and Canada on May 24, 2024, by Angel Studios.

== Cast ==
- Terry Chen as Dr. Ming Wang, a Chinese eye surgeon who relocated to Nashville, Tennessee.
  - Jayden Zhang as an 8 year old Ming
  - Ben Wang as young Ming
- Greg Kinnear as Dr. Misha Bartnovsky, Ming's eye surgeon partner
- Natasha Mumba as Ruth Tarik
- Fionnula Flanagan as Sister Marie
- Mia SwamiNathan as Kajal
- Raymond Ma as Zhensheng
  - Donald Heng as young Zhensheng
- Wai Ching Ho as Alian
  - Leanne Wang as young Alian
- Garland Chang as Yu Wang
- Jeffrey Pai as Lao Bin
- Sara Ye as Lili
- Natalie Skye as June Bartnovsky
- Danni Wang as Anle

== Production ==
Filming began in Vancouver in April 2021 and wrapped after a six-week shoot in October 2021.

== Release ==
In April 2023, it was reported that Briarcliff Entertainment had acquired distribution rights for Sight and scheduled a release date for October 27, 2023. In February 2024, Angel Studios acquired the rights and scheduled the film to be released on May 24, 2024.

== Reception ==
=== Critical response ===
On the review aggregator website Rotten Tomatoes, 76% of 45 critics' reviews are positive, with an average rating of 5.9/10. The website's consensus reads: "A faith-based film with a sweetly humanist grounding, Sight blinks at delivering much tonal nuance but delivers its true inspirational tale with moving conviction." Metacritic, which uses a weighted average, assigned the film a score of 42 out of 100, based on 4 critics, indicating "mixed or average" reviews. Audiences surveyed by CinemaScore gave the film an average grade of "A" on an A+ to F scale, while those polled by PostTrak gave it an average of 4 1/2 out of 5 stars, with 68% saying they would definitely recommend it.

=== Box office ===
In the United States and Canada, Sight was scheduled to be released alongside Furiosa: A Mad Max Saga and The Garfield Movie, and was projected to gross around $3 million from 2,100 theaters in its four-day opening weekend. It went to debut on $2.8 million at the first weekend, finishing seventh at the box office.
