= Chang Can Dunk =

2023 film by Jingyi Shao

- Official release poster
- Directed by: Jingyi Shao
- Written by: Jingyi Shao
- Produced by: Rishi Rajani; Lena Waithe; Brad Weston; Negin Salmasi
- Starring: Bloom Li; Dexter Darden; Ben Wang; Zoe Renee; Chase Liefeld; Mardy Ma; Eric Anthony Lopez
- Cinematography: Ross Riege
- Edited by: Brad Turner
- Music by: Nathan Matthew David
- Production companies: Walt Disney Pictures; Hillman Grad Productions; Makeready
- Distributed by: Disney+
- Release date: March 10, 2023
- Running time: 109 minutes
- Country: United States
- Languages: English; Mandarin

Chang Can Dunk is a 2023 American sports teen drama film written and directed by Jingyi Shao in his feature length debut, starring Bloom Li, Dexter Darden, Ben Wang, Zoe Renee, Chase Liefeld, Eric Anthony Lopez and Mardy Ma. The film is an underdog coming-of-age story, involving high school basketball and the titular character's determination to overcome expectations. The film was released on Disney+ on March 10, 2023.

== Plot ==
Xiao Ming "Bernard" Chang is a high school sophomore and band member who is interested in basketball. His former friend Matt O'Neil, the school's star player, is a rival. Chang becomes smitten with his new bandmate Kristy, but Matt begins flirting with her. At a house party, Matt's friends lock Chang in a basement. After escaping, Chang confronts Matt over an earlier gym class incident and claims he can dunk. Matt disputes it. Chang is humiliated when he slips and falls into a swimming pool.

Wanting to reinvent himself, and tired of his mother Chen's constant judgment, Chang bets Matt that he can dunk by homecoming. If Chang wins, Matt must shave his head and give him his Kobe Bryant jersey. If Matt wins, Chang must shave his head and give Matt his first-edition Pokémon card. Chang trains with his best friend Bo but sees little progress, so he seeks out Deandre Cooke, a YouTuber who films himself dunking. Unable to pay Deandre, Bo offers to improve the production of his videos, and Deandre agrees to mentor Chang. Chang improves and bonds with Deandre but grows distant from Chen. The night before the attempt, Chang sneaks into the school. The next morning, he completes the dunk before a crowd, wins the bet, and becomes famous at school.

ESPN invites Chang to New York, and he brings his friends. Asked to repeat the dunk, he misses and blames the wind. Consumed by fame, he nearly abandons his friends. Back at school, Matt shows a video proving Chang cheated by lowering the basket. Chang denies it and accuses Matt of racism. They fight and are suspended. Chen learns what Chang has been doing and tells him he does not need to prove himself to others. Chang replies that she makes everyone unhappy. Realizing he cannot make the dunk, he publicly apologizes for cheating.

Chen confronts Deandre, who tells her he believes in Chang. She then destroys the unfinished veranda her estranged husband left behind, and Chang helps her. This helps repair their relationship. Chang reconciles with Bo and Kristy, whom he begins dating, and with Matt. Later, Chang is on the basketball team. Entering a game, he steals the ball and rises for a dunk as the film ends.

== Cast ==
- Bloom Li as Chang
- Ben Wang as Bo
- Zoe Renee as Kristy
- Mardy Ma as Chen
- Dexter Darden as Deandre
- Chase Liefeld as Matt
- Dominic Pace as Mr. Bennevido
- Nile Bullock as Owen
- Eric Anthony Lopez as Syd
- Chris Critelli as Mr. Ryan
- Jenna Roach as Melissa
- Jim E. Chandler as Mr. O'Neil
- Elizabeth Inghram as Mrs. O'Neil
- Aaron Vargas as Todd
- Julien Goldberg as Timmy
- Jay Williams as himself
- Kimberley Anna Martin as herself
- Kendrick Perkins as himself
- Andre Drummond as himself
- Richard Jefferson as himself
- Angel Oquendo as a coach

== Production ==
=== Development ===
The film was reported in 2019 with a script by Jingyi Shao, the film was ultimately placed on hold and deemed a 2020 The Black List-ed film, which includes screenplays that would not be released in theaters during that calendar year due to the COVID-19 pandemic. By September 2021, it was announced that Shao will also serve as director on the project, while Bloom Li was cast in the titular role. Chase Liefeld joined the cast later that month. Rishi Rajani and Brad Weston serve as producers. On November 4, 2021, it was reported that Dexter Darden and Ben Wang joined the cast.

=== Filming ===
Initially announced to begin production in October 2021, principal photography commenced ahead of schedule in September of the same year. Scenes were filmed October 22–23, 2021 at Frank Scott Bunnell High School in Stratford, Connecticut. Filming also took place for a month and a half at Westhill High School in Stamford, Connecticut. By December 2, 2021, filming had wrapped up. In December 2021, Zoe Renee and Mardy Ma were revealed as part of the cast.

=== Credits ===
Nathan Matthew David composed the film score.

== Release ==
Chang Can Dunk was released exclusively as a Disney+ original film on March 10, 2023.

== Reception ==
=== Critical response ===
On the review aggregator website Rotten Tomatoes, 95% of 21 critics' reviews are positive, with an average rating of 6.80/10. On Metacritic, the film has a weighted average score of 77 out of 100 based on reviews from five critics, indicating "generally favorable" reviews.

Frank Sheck of The Hollywood Reporter praised Jingyi Shao for his directing and writing, stating he provides "amusing dialogue that rings true and complex characterizations defying easy stereotypes," and said, "Chang Can Dunk delivers a valuable message that should certainly resonate with its target audience." Calum Marsh of The New York Times called the film "exhilarating" and "warmhearted", said it manages to avoid clichés, and found it to be entertaining and thoughtful high school comedy.

Brian Lowry of CNN asserted, "Chang Can Dunk isn't an all-star, but viewed that way it's a nice wrinkle on an old story – the sort of calculated leap that, unlike Chang's gamble, feels like a pretty good bet." Jennifer Green of Common Sense Media gave the film a grade of 4 out of 5 stars, praised the presence of positive messages and role models, citing loyalty and perseverance, and complimented the diverse representations across the cast.

=== Accolades ===
Jingyi Shao was one of the ten directors honored during the Palm Springs International Film Festival for his contribution to the film.

== See also ==
- List of basketball films
