= Zoe Renee =

American actress

- Born: May 30, 1997 (age 29); Fayetteville, Georgia, U.S.
- Occupation: Actress
- Years active: 2017–present
- Known for: The Quad; Jinn

Zoe Renee is an American actress. She has acted on the series The Quad and in the films Jinn, Master, Chang Can Dunk, and the film The Hunger Games: The Ballad of Songbirds & Snakes.

== Life and career ==
Renee was raised in Fayetteville, Georgia, a city south of Atlanta. She has one brother. Her father, Speech, was in the '90s rap group Arrested Development. Renee enjoyed singing, dancing, and acting throughout childhood. She named Keke Palmer and Raven-Symoné as two actresses she admired growing up.

Renee was a main cast member in the BET series The Quad that ran for two seasons. She next starred in the independent drama film Jinn (2018) directed by Nijla Mu'min, on which she portrayed a Muslim teenager.

In 2022, she was cast as a lead in the film Master opposite Regina Hall. She played the love interest Kristy in the Disney+ film Chang Can Dunk. Renee is a cast member in the film The Hunger Games: The Ballad of Songbirds & Snakes, playing Lysistrata Vickers.

== Filmography ==
=== Film ===
Year	Title	Role	Notes
2013	Welcome to the Bubs	Raina	Short
2018	Jinn	Summer	
2019	Nancy Drew and the Hidden Staircase	George Fayne	
2019	Gully	Keisha	
2020	Prom	Kylie	Short
2023	Chang Can Dunk	Kristy	
2023	The Hunger Games: The Ballad of Songbirds & Snakes	Lysistrata Vickers	

=== Television ===
Year	Title	Role	Notes
2017–2018	The Quad	Noni Williams	17 episodes
2019	Black Lightning	Maryam Luqman	2 episodes
2019	(Future) Cult Classic	Mila	TV Movie
2022	Tell Me Lies	Charlie	3 episodes
2026	The Five-Star Weekend	Posey Woodford	3 episodes
