= Henry Durant (disambiguation) =

Henry Durant (1802–1875), founding president of the University of California

- Henry Durant (bishop) (1871–1932), Anglican bishop
- Henry Fowle Durant (1822–1881), founder of Wellesley College
- Henry William Durant (1902–1982), British opinion pollster

== See also ==
- Henry Durand (disambiguation)
