= Urban retrofitting =

Policy to redemy or undo urban sprawl

Urban retrofitting is a combination of policies and phenomena done with the goal of undoing or remedying the effects of urban sprawl. The phenomena of adaptive reuse and infill development to combat sprawl are key to this. It often follows the new urbanist school of thought, which aims to undo the sprawl and flight from urbanized areas that occurred in the US and Canada after WWII.

== History and issues to solve ==
Ellen Dunham-Jones and June Williamson, professors of urban planning and architecture at Georgia Tech and CUNY, respectively, wrote the book on this phenomenon. Much of their work is captured in their book, "Retrofitting Suburbia: Urban Design Solutions for Redesigning Suburbs which discusses the phenomena of urban sprawl, economic development, climate change mitigation, and environmental justice.

In short, there are several issues that modern society faces that are either caused by or exacerbated by car dependency. These challenges include, but are not limited to: disrupting automobile dependence to promote public transit, "improve public health, support an aging population, leverage social capital for equity, compete for jobs, and add water and energy resilience" per the Congress for New Urbanism.

== Solutions to sprawl and effects ==
This phenomenon uses underutilized lots, parking lots, greyfield lots, densification of land use especially in regard to residential density, and rezoning to encourage walkability.

In a case study of the Belmar neighborhood of Lakewood, Colorado of the former Villa Italia Mall, the retrofit of the property resulted in the following:

- 22 city blocks on 103 acres
- 777,000 square feet of retail space
- 868,000 square feet of office space
- 190,000 square feet of hotel space
- 1,048 housing units
- 9 acres of public parks/plazas
- 5,000 parking spaces (garage, surface and street)

There are several other cases of successful retrofits, including downtown Silver Spring, Maryland; North Hills in Raleigh, North Carolina; and CityCentre in Houston, Texas.

== See also ==
- Urban sprawl
- Infill
- Walkability
- Zoning
- Mixed-use development
- Sunk cost
- Green retrofit
- Gentrification
- Urban renewal
- Urban decay
- Cost of poverty
