= Retrofitting =

Addition of new technology or features to older systems

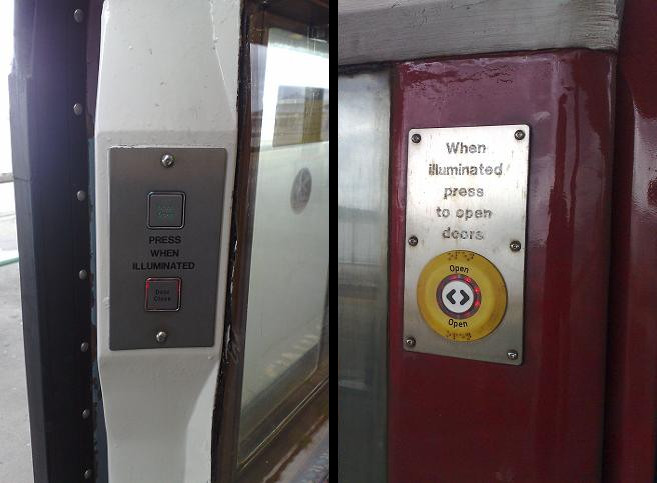
In this example of retrofitting (interior view on left, exterior on right), a set of modern door-opening buttons has been retrofitted to this British Rail Class 483 electric multiple unit, which was derived from 1938 tube stock.

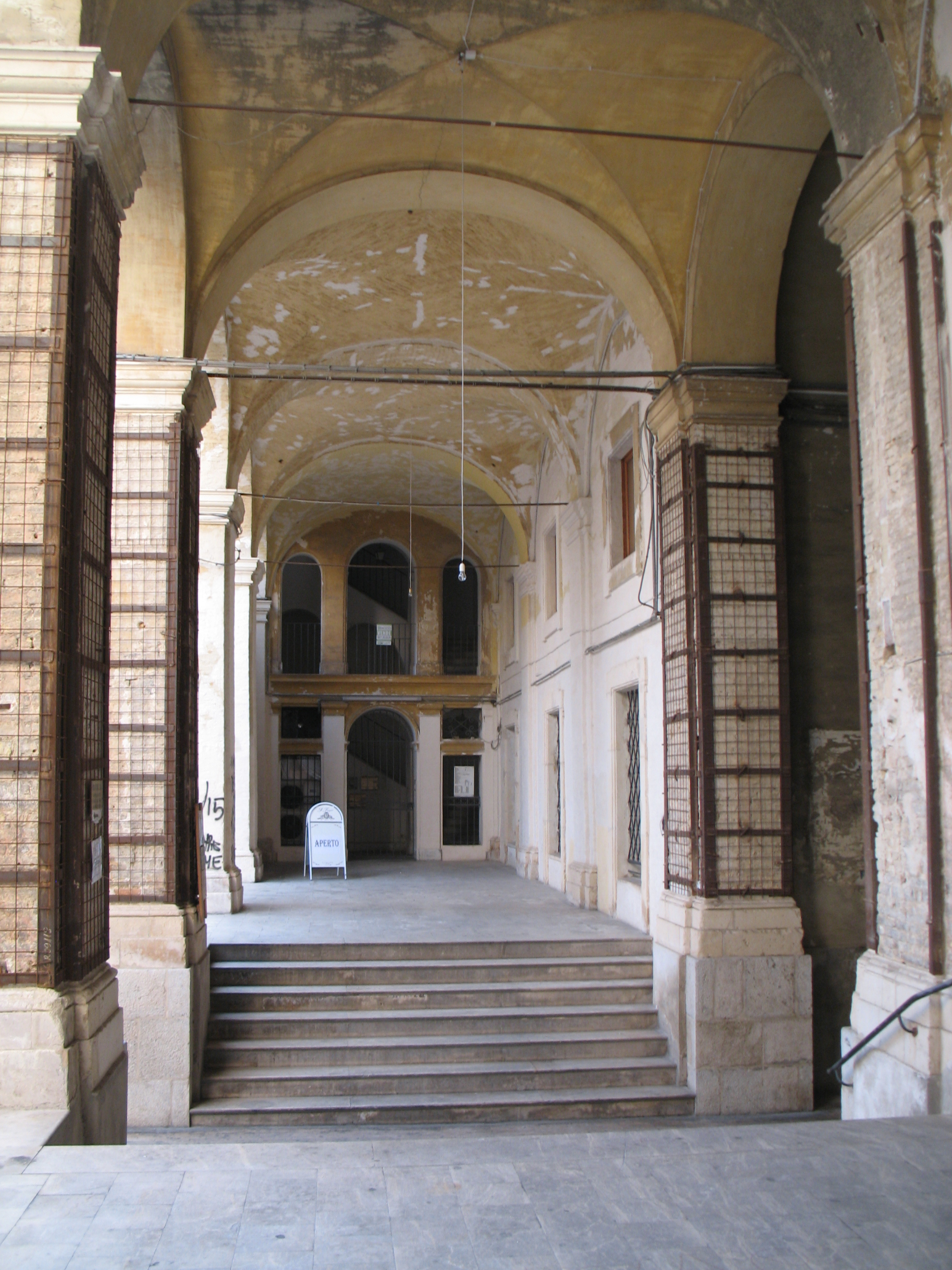
This 17th-century former noble palace (Palazzo Martinetti-Bianchi) in Chieti, Italy was retrofitted to increase structural safety. Rebars for columns and tie rods were used.

Retrofitting is the addition of new technology or features to older systems. Retrofits can happen for a number of reasons, for example with big capital expenditures like naval vessels, military equipment or manufacturing plants, businesses or governments may retrofit in order to reduce the need to replace a system entirely. Other retrofits may be due to changing codes or requirements, such as seismic retrofit which are designed strengthening older buildings in order to make them earthquake resistant.

Retrofitting is also an important part of climate change mitigation and climate change adaptation: because society invested in built infrastructure, housing and other systems before the magnitude of changes anticipated by climate change. Retrofits to increase building efficiency, for example, both help reduce the overall negative impacts of climate change by reducing building emissions and environmental impacts while also allowing the building to be more healthy during extreme weather events. Retrofitting also is part of a circular economy, reducing the amount of newly manufactured goods, thus reducing lifecycle emissions and environmental impacts.

== In different contexts ==
=== Building efficiency and greening ===
Sustainable refurbishment describes working on existing buildings to improve their environmental performance using sustainable methods and materials. A refurbishment or retrofit is defined as: "any work to a building over and above maintenance to change its capacity, function or performance' in other words, any intervention to adjust, reuse, or upgrade a building to suit new conditions or requirements". Refurbishment can be done to a part of a building, an entire building, or a campus. Sustainable refurbishment takes this a step further to modify the existing building to perform better in terms of its environmental impact and its occupants' environment.

Most sustainable refurbishments are also green retrofits: any refurbishment of an existing building that aims to reduce the carbon emissions and environmental impact of the building. This can include improving the energy efficiency of the HVAC and other mechanical systems, increasing the quality of insulation in the building envelope, implementing sustainable energy generation, and aiming to improve occupant comfort and health.

Green retrofits have become increasingly prominent with their inclusion in a number of building rating systems, such as the USGBC's LEED for Existing Buildings: Operations & Maintenance, Passive House EnerPHit, and Green Globes for Existing Buildings. Some governments offer funding towards green retrofits as existing buildings make up a majority of operational buildings and have been identified as a growing area of consideration in the fight against climate change.

=== Manufacturing ===
Principally retrofitting describes the measures taken in the manufacturing industry to allow new or updated parts to be fitted to old or outdated assemblies (like blades to wind turbines).

Retrofitting parts are necessary for manufacture when the design of a large assembly is changed or revised. If, after the changes have been implemented, a customer (with an old version of the product) wishes to purchase a replacement part, then retrofit parts and assembling techniques will have to be used so that the revised parts will fit suitably onto the older assembly.

Retrofitting is an important process used for valves and actuators to ensure optimal operation of an industrial plant. One example is retrofitting a 3-way valve into a 2-way valve, which results in closing one of the three openings to continue using the valve for certain industrial systems.

Retrofitting can improve a machine or system's overall functionality by using advanced and updated equipment and technology—such as integrating Human Machine Interfaces into older factories.

==== Benefits of manufacturing retrofits ====
- Saving on capital expenditure while benefiting from new technologies
- Optimization of existing plant components
- Adaptation of the plant for new or changed products
- Increase in piece number and cycle time
- Guaranteed spare parts availability
- Reduced maintenance costs and increased reliability

=== Vehicles ===
Car customizing is a form of retrofitting, where older vehicles are fitted with new technologies: power windows, cruise control, remote keyless systems, electric fuel pumps, driverless systems, etc.

Trucks and agricultural machines can also be given retrofits to make them driverless.

=== Military equipment ===
Many naval vessels have undergone retrofitting and refitting, sometimes entire classes at once. For instance, the New Threat Upgrade program of the US Navy saw many vessels retrofitted for improved anti-air capability. Naval vessels are often retrofit for one of three reasons: to incorporate new technology, to compensate for performance gaps or weaknesses in design, or to change the ship's classification.

Militaries of the world are often ardent adopters of the latest technology, and many technological advances have been spurred by warfare, especially in fields such as radar and radio communications. Because of this, and the significant investment that a ship hull represents, it is common for retrofitting to be performed whenever new systems are developed. This may be as small as replacing one type of radio with another, or replacing out-dated cryptography equipment with more secure methods of communication, or as major as replacing entire guns and turrets, adding armor plate, or new propulsion systems.

Other ships are retrofit to compensate for weaknesses perceived in their operational capabilities. This was the secondary purpose of the US Navy's New Threat Upgrade program, for instance. Major changes in doctrine or the art of warfare also necessitate changes, such as the anti-aircraft upgrades performed on many World War Two-era vessels as air power became a dominant part of naval strategy and tactics.

Additionally, because of the investment a hull represents, few navies scrap front-line warships. Many times smaller ships are retrofitted for patrol, coast guard, or specialized roles when they are no longer fit for duty as part of a warfleet. The Japanese Momi class from the interwar period, for example, was converted from destroyers to patrol boats in 1939, as they were no longer capable enough to serve in the role of destroyer. Other times classes are retrofit because they are no longer needed in warfare, due to changes in tactics. For instance, the USS Langley was an aircraft carrier converted from a collier (coal-carrying ship to supply coal-fired steamships with fuel) of the Jupiter-class.

Because of the heavy use of retrofitting and refitting, fictional navies also include the concept. As an example, in the Star Trek MMORPG Star Trek Online players can purchase retrofitted ships of famous Star Trek ship classes, such as those crewed by the protagonists of the Star Trek TV series. This is done to allow players to pilot iconic ships from old series of the show, that wouldn't naturally be latest-and-greatest ships due to their obsolescence or size, but are retrofitted to be suitable for a maximum-level player-character admiral.

=== Environmental management ===
The term is also used in the field of environmental engineering, particularly to describe construction or renovation projects on previously built sites, to improve water quality in nearby streams, rivers or lakes. The concept has also been applied to changing the output mix of energy from power plants to cogeneration in urban areas with a potential for district heating.

Sites with extensive impervious surfaces (such as parking lots and rooftops) can generate high levels of stormwater runoff during rainstorms, and this can damage nearby water bodies. These problems can often be addressed by installing new stormwater management features on the site, a process that practitioners refer to as stormwater retrofitting. Stormwater management practices used in retrofit projects include rain gardens, permeable paving and green roofs. (See also stream restoration.)

== See also ==
- Automotive aftermarket – Automotive industry concerned with secondary parts
- Backporting – Developing an update for older software based on an update to a newer version
- Conservation and restoration of road vehicles
- Diesel particulate filter – Removes diesel particulate matter or soot from the exhaust gas of a diesel engine
- Electric vehicle conversion – Process of converting a vehicle to use electric propulsion
- Green retrofit – Concept in environmentalism
- Patch (computing) – Data and process for mutating a software resource to a desired state
- Reindustrialization – Economic, social, and political process
- Scrappage program – Government incentive program
- Urban retrofitting – Policy to redemy or undo urban sprawl
