= Ruth Glass =

British sociologist

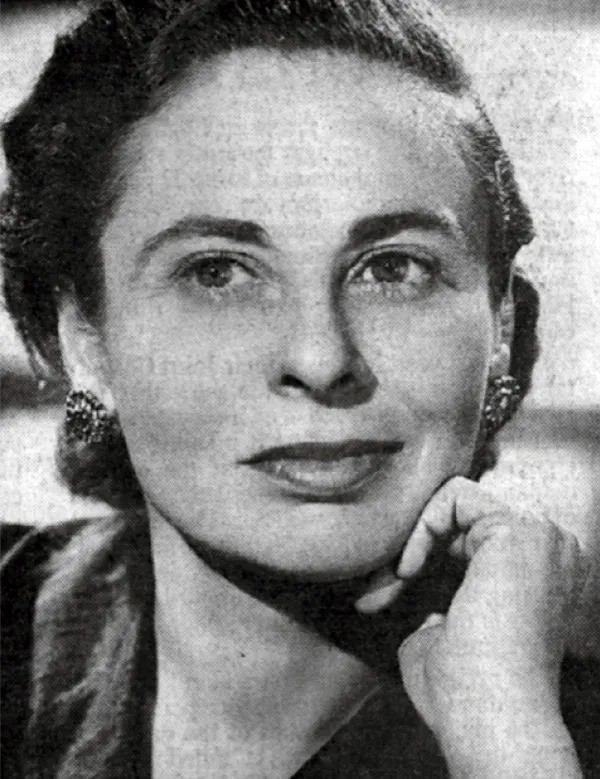
- Ruth Glass in 1948
- Born: June 21, 1912; Berlin, Germany
- Died: March 7, 1990 (aged 77); London, England
- Occupation: Sociologist
- Known for: Coining the term "gentrification"

Ruth Glass (born Ruth Adele Lazarus, 30 June 1912 – 7 March 1990) was a German-born British sociologist, urban planner and founder (in 1958) of the Centre for Urban Studies at University College London (UCL).

== Life ==
She was born in Berlin on 30 June 1912, the daughter of Eli Lazarus, who was Jewish, and Lilly Leszczynska. She left Germany in 1932, studying at the London School of Economics. After spending two years from 1941 at the Bureau of Applied Social Research of Columbia University, she returned to the United Kingdom in 1943. She concentrated on town planning and social planning.

== Work ==
Glass's work reflected her belief "that the purpose of sociological research was to influence government policy and bring about social change". A lasting legacy is her coining of the term "gentrification", which she created to describe the processes by which the poor were squeezed out of parts of London as upper-class ghettos were created.

A key figure in urban sociology, Ruth Glass made a significant contribution to the institutionalisation of British sociology as an academic discipline in the 1950s. Her reputation in this field was established from the late 1930s by studies of housing developments and planning at the Watling Estate in London and in Middlesbrough, and later by pioneer work on black immigration. However, as Eric Hobsbawm acknowledged in his obituary of Glass, the text of what would have been her major work, the Third London Survey (successor to the surveys of Booth and Llewellyn-Smith), was never quite completed.

== Family ==
Between 1935 and 1941 she was married to Henry William Durant, the statistician and pioneer in the field of public opinion polling. She married David Victor Glass, a sociologist and demographer, in 1942.

== Selected publications ==
- Glass, Ruth Lazarus (1939). Watling: a survey of social life on a new housing estate. London: P S King.
- Glass, R. (ed) (1948) The Social Background of a Plan: a Study of Middlesbrough, Preface by Max Lock, London : Routledge & Kegan Paul
- Glass, R. (1955) Urban Sociology in Great Britain: a trend report, Current Sociology, IV, 4: 8-35.
- Glass, Ruth Lazarus (1960). London's Newcomers: The West Indians in London. London: Centre for Urban Studies, University College London.
- Glass, Ruth Lazarus; Westergaard, John (1965). London's housing needs: statement of evidence to the Committee on Housing in Greater London. London: Centre for Urban Studies, University College London.
