= Gentrification =

Urban socioeconomic process

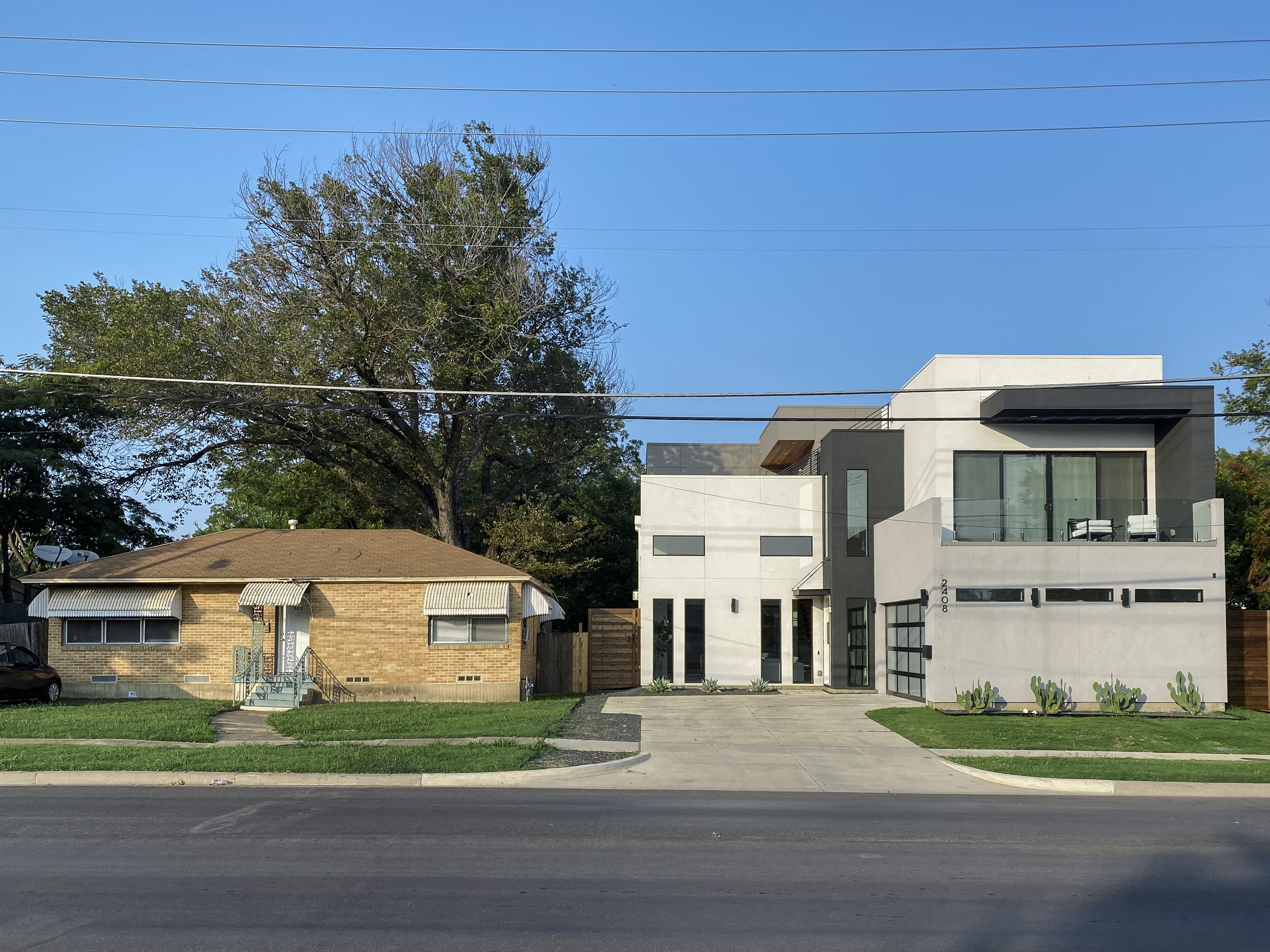
A mid-century rambler next to a larger modern house in Dallas, Texas, in 2020

Gentrification is the process whereby the character of a neighborhood changes through the influx of more affluent residents (the "gentry") and investment. There is no agreed-upon definition of gentrification. In public discourse, it has been used to describe a wide array of phenomena, sometimes in a pejorative connotation.

Gentrification is a common and controversial topic in urban politics and planning. Gentrification often increases the economic value of a neighborhood, but at the cost of changing demographic composition and potential displacement of incumbent residents. Gentrification is more likely when there is an undersupply of housing and rising housing values in a metropolitan area.

The gentrification process is typically the result of increasing attraction to an area by people with higher incomes than those of local residents spilling over from neighboring cities, towns, or neighborhoods. Further steps are increased commercial investments in the area and its infrastructure by real estate developers, local government, or community activists and resulting economic development, increased attraction of business, and lower crime rates.

== Origin and etymology ==
Historians say that gentrification took place in ancient Rome and in Roman Britain, where large villas were replacing small shops by the 3rd century CE. The word gentrification derives from gentry—which comes from Old French genterise, "of gentle birth" (14th century) and "people of gentle birth" (16th century). In England, landed gentry denoted the social class, consisting of gentlemen and gentlewomen (as the latter were known at that time).

A more direct derivational base of gentrification is the 19th-century neologism "gentrify," a verb coined by Samuel Laing (1780–1868). This term reflected shifting societal attitudes—specifically, the idea that one could attain upper-class status through conduct rather than birth—while also introducing undertones of conspicuous consumption and pretentiousness.

The British sociologist Ruth Glass was the first to use "gentrification" in its current sense. She used it in 1964 to describe the influx of middle-class people displacing lower-class worker residents in urban neighborhoods; her example was London and its working-class districts, such as Islington:

One by one, many of the working class neighbourhoods of London have been invaded by the middle-classes—upper and lower. Shabby, modest mews and cottages—two rooms up and two down—have been taken over, when their leases have expired, and have become elegant, expensive residences ... Once this process of 'gentrification' starts in a district it goes on rapidly, until all or most of the original working-class occupiers are displaced and the whole social character of the district is changed.

== Definitions ==
In the US, the Centers for Disease Control and Prevention report Health Effects of Gentrification defines the real estate concept of gentrification as "the transformation of neighborhoods from low value to high value." A real estate encyclopedia defines gentrification as "the process by which central urban neighborhoods that have undergone disinvestments and economic decline experience a reversal, reinvestment, and the in-migration of a well-off middle- and upper-middle-class population."

Scholars and pundits have applied a variety of definitions to gentrification since 1964, some oriented around gentrifiers, others oriented around the displaced, and some a combination of both. The first category include the Hackworth (2002) definition "the production of space for progressively more affluent users". The second category include Kasman's definition "the reduction of residential and retail space affordable to low-income residents". The final category includes Rose, who describes gentrification as a process "in which members of the 'new middle class' move into and physically and culturally reshape working-class inner city neighbourhoods".

Kennedy & Leonard (2001) say in their Brookings Institution report that "the term 'gentrification' is both imprecise and quite politically charged", suggesting its redefinition as "the process by which higher income households displace lower income residents of a neighborhood, changing the essential character and flavour of that neighborhood", so distinguishing it from the different socio-economic process of "neighborhood (or urban) revitalization", although the terms are sometimes used interchangeably. Kitis (2024) argues that Glass's original use of the word employs a war metaphor to emphasize the 'displacement of lower-income residents' as central—a class-struggle meaning that risks being sidelined in its continued use to denote processes of 'urban change' or 'improvement.'

Gentrification has been described as a natural cycle: the well-to-do prefer to live in the newest housing stock. Each decade of a city's growth, a new ring of housing is built. When the housing at the center has reached the end of its useful life and becomes cheap, the well-to-do gentrify the neighborhood. The push outward from the city center continues as the housing in each ring reaches the end of its economic life.

== Causes ==
Palen & London (1984) compiled five explanations for gentrification since the 1970s:

1. demographic-ecological: dual white-collar wage-earner households with fewer children wanted to live closer to work and thus moved to the inner city;
2. sociocultural: middle- and upper-middle-class families developed more pro-urban views, opting to live in urban areas;
3. political-economical: the decreasing availability of suburban land prompted more high-income individuals to live in urban areas;
4. community networks: technological advances in transportation and communication prompts more people to live in large-scale communities;
5. social movements: when high status elites and institutions sought to revive the inner cities, more high-income individuals moved into the cities.

Other explanations propose that as people tire of the automobile-dependent urban sprawl style of life, they move to urban areas, in particular to homes near public transit stations. The increase in professional jobs in the central business district has increased demand for living in urban areas according to Ley (1980). Critical geographers have argued that capital flows and developers have been instrumental in causing gentrification.

Researchers have identified displacement stemming from shifting demand for housing and real estate in areas impacted by climate change and natural hazards as leading to climate gentrification.

The de-industrialization of cities in developed nations may have caused displacement by reducing the number of blue-collar jobs available to the urban working class and middle class.

Some have argued that the counterculture movement in the 1960s created disdain for the "standardization of look-alike suburbs", prompting people to live in urban areas. Others argue that a desire to live near cultural attractions prompts gentrification.

== Effects ==
=== Crime ===
According to a 2020 systematic review of existing research, gentrification in the United States has led to a short-term reduction in crime in gentrifying neighborhoods. However, it noted that there is little evidence for more long-term impacts and that gentrification in some cases widens crime-related disparities.

=== Displacement ===
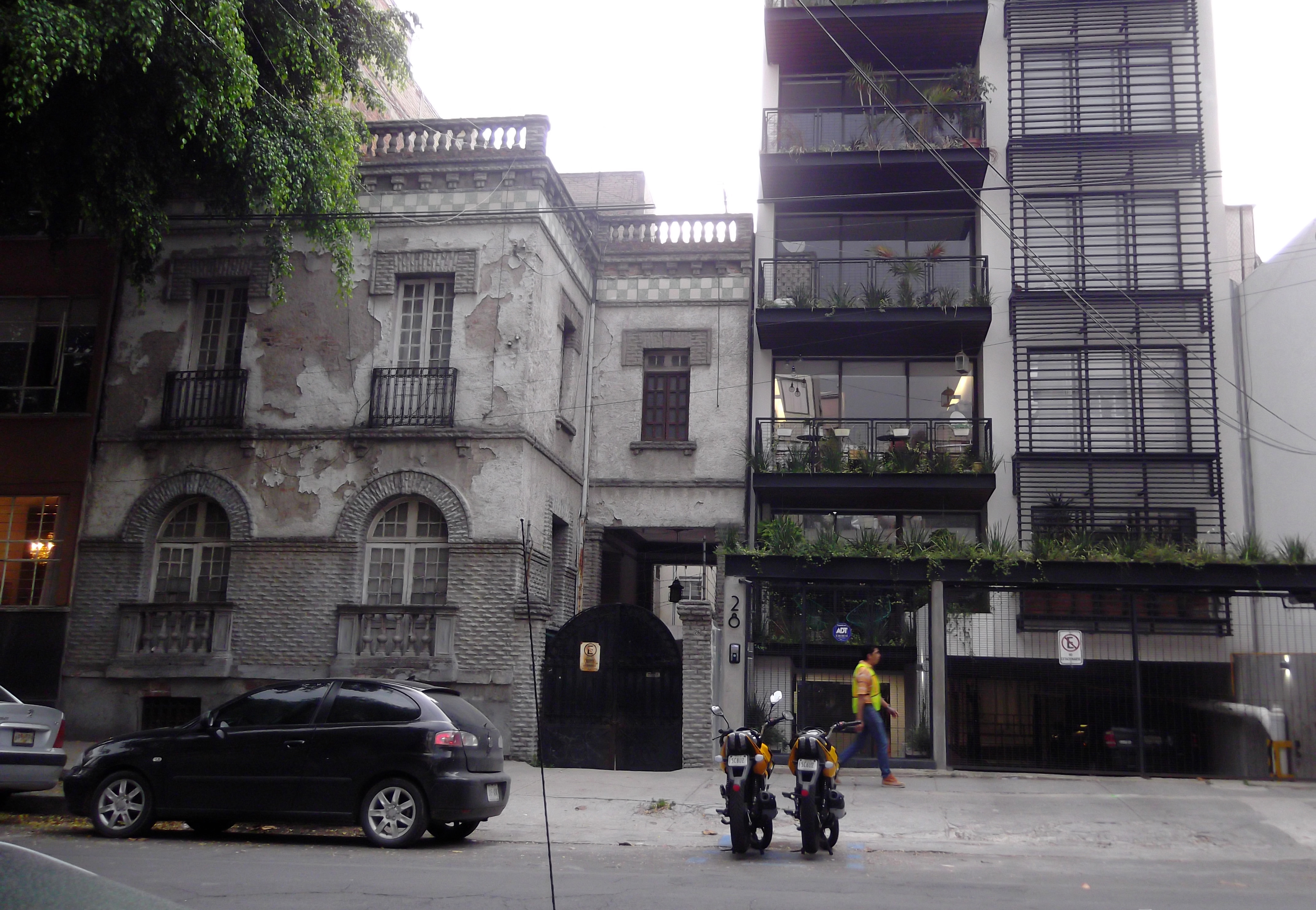
A 1920's neoclassical style house in Mexico City's Roma Norte district in need of repainting beside a modern loft tower in 2016

Displacement is often seen as a key effect of gentrification, although evidence is mixed as to whether gentrification leads to displacement (or even reduces displacement) and under which circumstances. In 2005, USA Today claimed that gentrification is a "boost for everyone" based on the impact of some recent studies and that displacement that arises is minimal, or caused by other factors. Some scholars have disputed these assertions, arguing that such studies distort facts and used limited datasets. In 2002, economist Jacob Vigdor wrote, "Overall, existing literature has failed to convincingly demonstrate that rates of involuntary displacement are higher in gentrifying neighborhoods."

A 2018 study found evidence that gentrification displaces renters, but not homeowners. The displacement of low-income rental residents is commonly referenced as a negative aspect of gentrification by its opponents. A 2022 study found evidence that gentrification leads to greater residential mobility.

In the United States, a 2023 study by Princeton University sociologists found that "eviction rates decreased more in gentrifying neighborhoods than in comparable low-income neighborhoods." A 2016 study found "that vulnerable residents, those with low credit scores and without mortgages, are generally no more likely to move from gentrifying neighborhoods compared with their counterparts in nongentrifying neighborhoods." A 2017 study by sociology professor Matthew Desmond, who runs Princeton University's Eviction Lab, "found no evidence that renters residing in gentrifying or in racially- and economically-integrated neighborhoods had a higher likelihood of eviction." A 2020 study which followed children from low-income families in New York found no evidence that gentrification was associated with changes in mobility rates. The study also found "that children who start out in a gentrifying area experience larger improvements in some aspects of their residential environment than their counterparts who start out in persistently low-socioeconomic status areas." A 2023 study by economists at the W. E. Upjohn Institute for Employment Research and Federal Reserve Bank of Philadelphia found that the construction of new large apartment buildings in low-income neighborhoods lead to an influx of high-income households but also decrease rents in nearby units by increasing housing supply.

In the United Kingdom, recent studies suggest that gentrification leads to exclusionary displacement – i.e. preventing low-income households from moving to an area due to high rent/home prices – but less so for direct displacement – forcing low-income households to move out of an area due to high rent/home prices. Often, a lack of low-level migration data limits displacement-based research.

In Vancouver, Canada, Hogan's Alley was an ethnically diverse and predominantly Black area in the Downtown Eastside that was demolished in the 1960s to construct the Georgia Viaduct. As a historically working-class district and Vancouver's first and only Black community, Hogan's Alley was home to many residents who were displaced, resulting in disruption to the community. This reflects how gentrification has disproportionately impacted racialized communities in many North American cities. Since the 1970s, the Downtown Eastside has undergone ongoing urban transformation. The influx of upper-end restaurants and bars into historically marginalized communities has contributed to resident polarization, disinvestment in lower-income housing stock, and tensions between different socioeconomic groups.

=== Social changes ===
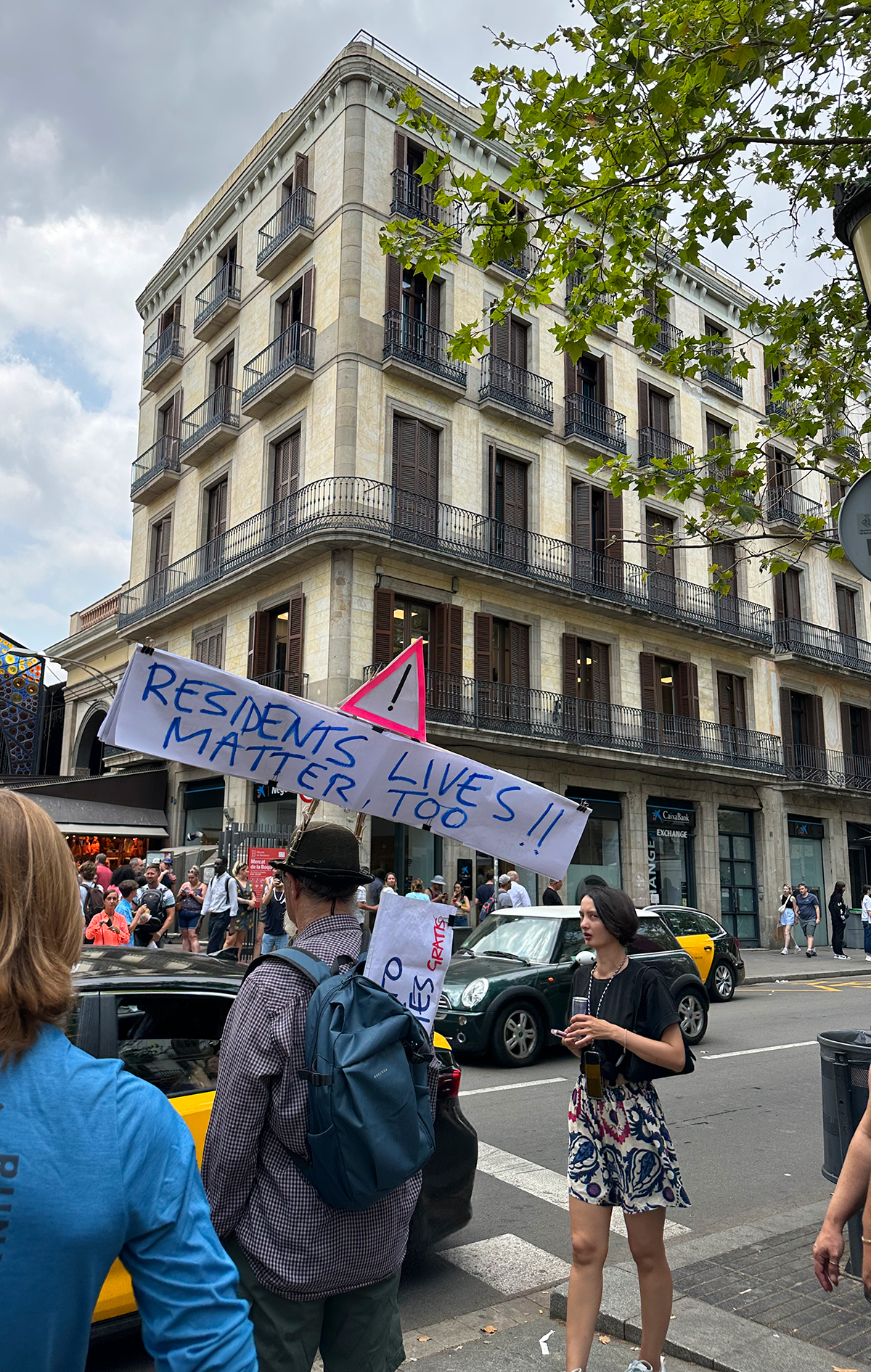
Local neighbor protesting against tourists in La Rambla (Barcelona, Spain)

Many of the social effects of gentrification have been based on extensive theories about how socioeconomic status of an individual's neighborhood will shape one's behavior and future. These studies have prompted "social mix policies" to be widely adopted by governments to promote the process and its positive effects, such as lessening the strain on public resources that are associated with de-concentrating poverty. However, more specific research has shown that gentrification does not necessarily correlate with "social mixing", and that the effects of the new composition of a gentrified neighborhood can both weaken as well as strengthen community cohesion.

Housing confers social status, and the changing norms that accompany gentrification translate to a changing social hierarchy. The process of gentrification mixes people of different socioeconomic strata, thereby congregating a variety of expectations and social norms. The change gentrification brings in class distinction also has been shown to contribute to residential polarization by income, education, household composition, and race. It conveys a social rise that brings new standards in consumption, particularly in the form of excess and superfluity, to the area that were not held by the pre-existing residents. These differing norms can lead to conflict, which potentially serves to divide changing communities. Often this comes at a larger social cost to the original residents of the gentrified area whose displacement is met with little concern from the gentry or the government. Clashes that result in increased police surveillance, for example, would more adversely affect young minorities who are also more likely to be the original residents of the area.

There is also evidence to support that gentrification can strengthen and stabilize when there is a consensus about a community's objectives. Gentrifiers with an organized presence in deteriorated neighborhoods can demand and receive better resources. A characteristic example is a combined community effort to win historic district designation for the neighborhood, a phenomenon that is often linked to gentrification activity. Gentry can exert a peer influence on neighbors to take action against crime, which can lead to even more price increases in changing neighborhoods when crime rates drop and optimism for the area's future climbs.

Some argue that gentrification is associated with the decline of distinctive local businesses and the rise of chains and franchises.

Rehabilitation movements have been largely successful at restoring the plentiful supply of old and deteriorated housing that is readily available in inner cities. This rehabilitation can be seen as a superior alternative to expansion, for the location of the central city offers an intact infrastructure that should be taken advantage of: streets, public transportation, and other urban facilities. Furthermore, the changed perception of the central city that is encouraged by gentrification can be healthy for resource-deprived communities who have previously been largely ignored. Gentrifiers provide the political effectiveness needed to draw more government funding towards physical and social area improvements, while improving the overall quality of life by providing a larger tax base.

Communities have strong ties to the history and culture of their neighborhood, and causing its dispersal can have detrimental costs.

=== Economic shifts ===
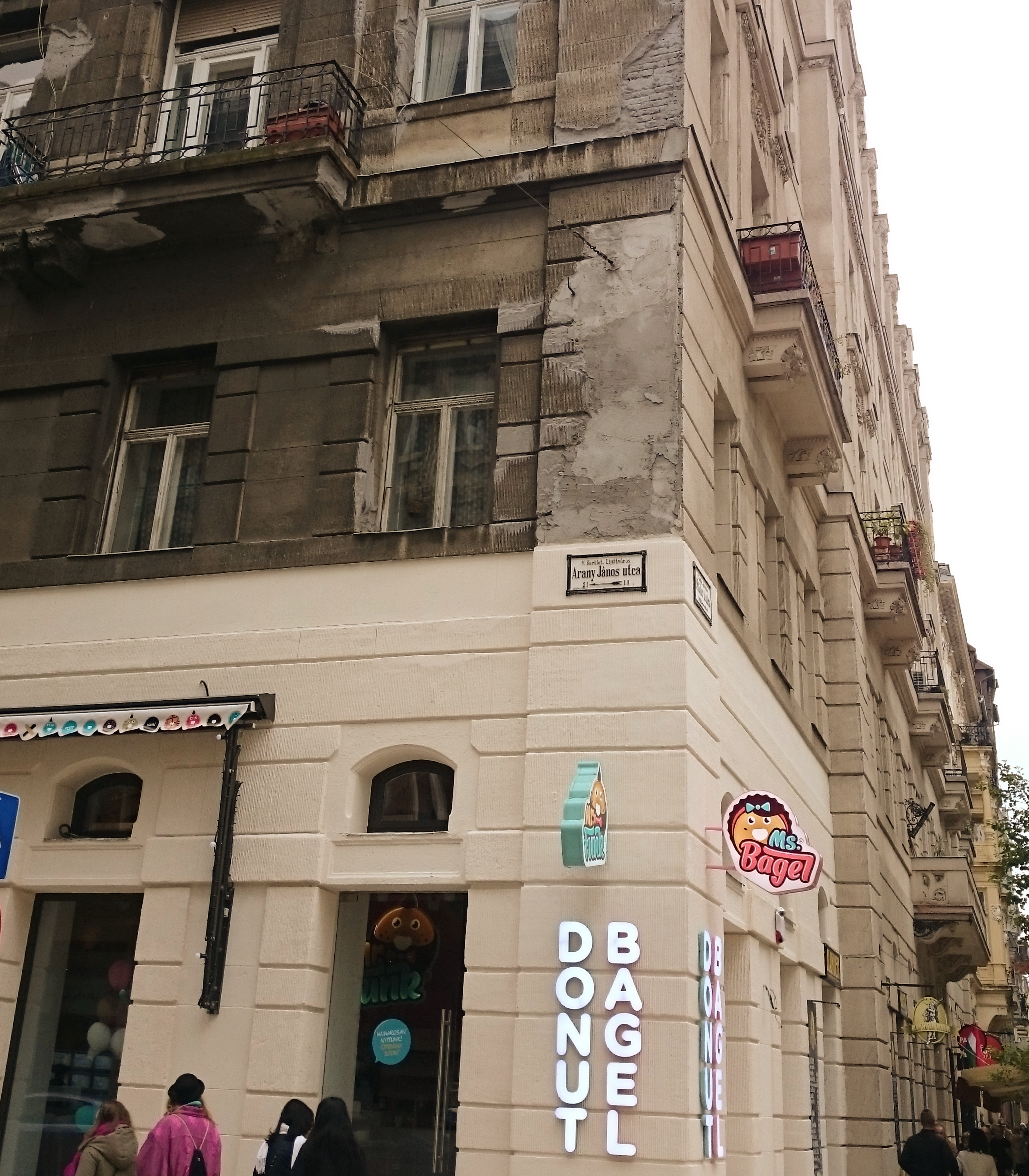
An apartment building in Budapest in the process of renovation

The economic changes that occur as a community goes through gentrification are often favorable for local governments. Affluent gentrifiers expand the local tax base as well as support local shops and businesses, a large part of why the process is frequently alluded to in urban policies. The decrease in vacancy rates and increase in property value that accompany the process can work to stabilize a previously struggling community, restoring interest in inner-city life as a residential option alongside the suburbs. These changes can create positive feedback as well, encouraging other forms of development of the area that promote general economic growth.

Home ownership is a significant variable when it comes to economic impacts of gentrification. People who own their homes are much more able to gain financial benefits of gentrification than those who rent their houses and can be displaced without much compensation.

Economic pressure and market price changes relate to the speed of gentrification. English-speaking countries have a higher number of property owners and a higher mobility. German speaking countries provide a higher share of rented property and have a much stronger role of municipalities, cooperatives, guilds and unions offering low-price-housing. The effect is a lower speed of gentrification and a broader social mix. Gerhard Hard sees gentrification as a typical 1970s term with more visibility in public discourse than actual migration.

A 2017 study found that gentrification leads to job gains overall, with job losses in proximate locations but job gains further away. A 2014 study found that gentrification led to job gains in the gentrifying neighborhood.

A 2016 study found that residents who stay in gentrifying neighborhoods go on to obtain higher credit scores whereas residents who leave gentrifying neighborhoods obtain lower credit scores.

=== Education ===
"School gentrification" is characterized by: (i) increased numbers of middle-class families; (ii) material and physical upgrades (e.g. new programs, educational resources, and infrastructural improvements); (iii) forms of exclusion and/or the marginalization of low-income students and families (e.g. in both enrollment and social relations); and (iv) changes in school culture and climate (e.g. traditions, expectations, and social dynamics).

A 2024 study found that adding high-density mixed-income developments to low-income neighborhoods in London, United Kingdom, led to improved educational outcomes for the children who were already living in the neighborhood. The plausible mechanism for this effect is that incumbent students were exposed to more high-ability students.

In Chicago, among neighborhood public schools located in areas that did undergo gentrification, one study found that schools experience no aggregate academic benefit from the socioeconomic changes occurring around them, despite improvements in other public services such street repair, sanitation, policing, and firefighting. The lack of gentrification-related benefits to schools may be related to the finding that white gentrifiers often do not enroll their children in local neighborhood public schools.

Programs and policies designed to attract gentrifying families to historically disinvested schools may have unintended negative consequences, including an unbalanced landscape of influence wherein the voices and priorities of more affluent parents are privileged over those of lower-income families. In addition, rising enrollment of higher-income families in neighborhood schools can result in the political and cultural displacement of long-term residents in school decision-making processes and the loss of Title I funding. Notably, the expansion of school choice (e.g., charter schools, magnet schools, open enrollment policies) have been found to significantly increase the likelihood that college-educated white households gentrify low-income communities of color.

=== Health ===
A culmination of recent research suggests that gentrification has both detrimental and beneficial effects on health.

A 2020 review found that studies tended to show adverse health impacts for Black residents and elderly residents in areas undergoing gentrification.

A 2019 study in New York, found that gentrification has no impact on rates of asthma or obesity among low-income children. Growing up in gentrifying neighborhoods was associated with moderate increases in being diagnosed with anxiety or depression between ages 9–11 relative to similar children raised in non-gentrifying areas. The effects of gentrification on mental health were most prominent for children living in market-rate (rather than subsidized) housing, which lead the authors of the study to suggest financial stress as a possible mechanism.

Preventing or mitigating gentrification is thought to be a method to promote health equity.

== Measurement ==
Whether gentrification has occurred in a census tract in an urban area in the United States during a particular 10-year period between censuses can be determined by a method used in a study by Governing: If the census tract in a central city had 500 or more residents and at the time of the baseline census had median household income and median home value in the bottom 40th percentile and at the time of the next 10-year census the tract's educational attainment (percentage of residents over age 25 with a bachelor's degree) was in the top 33rd percentile; the median home value, adjusted for inflation, had increased; and the percentage of increase in home values in the tract was in the top 33rd percentile when compared to the increase in other census tracts in the urban area then it was considered to have been gentrified. The method measures the rate of gentrification, not the degree of gentrification; thus, San Francisco, which has a history of gentrification dating to the 1970s, show a decreasing rate between 1990 and 2010.

Scholars have also identified census indicators that can be used to reveal that gentrification is taking place in a given area, including a drop in the number of children per household, increased education among residents, the number of non-traditional types of households, and a general upwards shift in income.

== Population impacts ==
Just as critical to the gentrification process as creating a favorable environment is the availability of the 'gentry,' or those who will be first-stage gentrifiers. The typical gentrifiers are affluent and have professional-level, service industry jobs, many of which involve self-employment. Therefore, they are willing and able to take the investment risk in the housing market. Often they are single people or young couples without children who lack demand for good schools. Gentrifiers are likely searching for inexpensive housing close to the workplace and often already reside in the inner city, sometimes for educational reasons, and do not want to make the move to suburbia. For this demographic, gentrification is not so much the result of a return to the inner city but is more of a positive action to remain there. Though early gentrifiers may intend to remain in the neighborhoods they move into, they too are at risk of being bought-out or pushed as the areas increase in favorability by higher-income groups of gentrifiers that become interested in the urban developments. The cycle of gentrification relies on the built attraction of certain urban areas and neighborhoods, as areas near or within major cities are often the targets. However, as corporations also take notice of changes in certain areas, they may establish sites—which furthers a wave of people motivated to move in for career opportunities. Previously established communities, who are often lower-class people of color become displaced as they may not be able to compete with rising rent and developments made. Though people noted as "gentrifiers" may not intend to negatively impact people around them, as more people in a certain class demographic enter, the neighborhood may begin to lose previous communities.

The stereotypical gentrifiers also have shared consumer preferences and favor a largely consumerist culture. This fuels the rapid expansion of trendy restaurant, shopping, and entertainment spheres that often accompany the gentrification process. Holcomb and Beauregard described these groups as those who are "attracted by low prices and toleration of an unconventional lifestyle".

Research on those who participate and initiate the gentrification process, the "marginal gentrifiers" as referred to by Tim Butler, has found that they become marginalized by the expansion of the process.

=== Upper class ===
Research shows how one reason wealthy, upper-class individuals and families hold some responsibility in the causation of gentrification is due to their social mobility. Wealthier families were more likely to have more financial freedom to move into urban areas, oftentimes choosing to do so for their work. At the same time, in these urban areas the lower-income population is decreasing due to an increase in the elderly population as well as demographic change.

Jackelyn Hwang and Jeffrey Lin have supported in their research that another reason for the influx of upper-class individuals to urban areas is due to the "increase in demand for college-educated workers". It is because of this demand that wealthier individuals with college degrees needed to move into urban cities for work, increasing prices in housing as the demand has grown. Additionally, Darren P. Smith finds through his research that college-educated workers moving into the urban areas causes them to settle there and raise children, which eventually contributes to the cost of education in regards to the migration between urban and suburban places.

Zukin examined gentrification through the lens of urban authenticity, focusing on how perceptions of authentic urban experience drive neighborhood transformation in New York City. Through case studies of neighborhoods like Williamsburg and Harlem, she documents how the very qualities that make neighborhoods appear authentic to middle-class consumers—ethnic diversity, historic architecture, local businesses—ultimately disappear as these areas gentrify. Zukin identifies how media, consumer culture, and government policies combine to facilitate gentrification through the promotion of authentic urban experiences. She demonstrates that seemingly spontaneous processes of neighborhood change are actually shaped by specific policy decisions, real estate investments, and cultural capital. The book explicitly critiques Jane Jacobs' vision of neighborhood preservation, arguing that Jacobs failed to recognize how market forces would commodify the authentic urban experiences she championed. Zukin concluded by advocating for policies that preserve not just the built environment but also social diversity, suggesting that truly authentic urbanism requires both economic and cultural rights to the city.

=== Women ===
Women increasingly obtaining higher education as well as higher paying jobs has increased their participation in the labor force, translating to an expansion of women who have greater opportunities to invest. Smith suggests this group "represents a reservoir of potential gentrifiers." The increasing number of highly educated women play into this theory, given that residence in the inner city can give women access to the well-paying jobs and networking, something that is becoming increasingly common.

There are also theories that suggest the inner-city lifestyle is important for women with children where the father does not care equally for the child, because of the proximity to professional childcare. This attracts single parents, specifically single mothers, to the inner-city as opposed to suburban areas where resources are more geographically spread out. This is often deemed as "marginal gentrification", for the city can offer an easier solution to combining paid and unpaid labor. Inner city concentration increases the efficiency of commodities parents need by minimizing time constraints among multiple jobs, childcare, and markets.

=== Artists ===
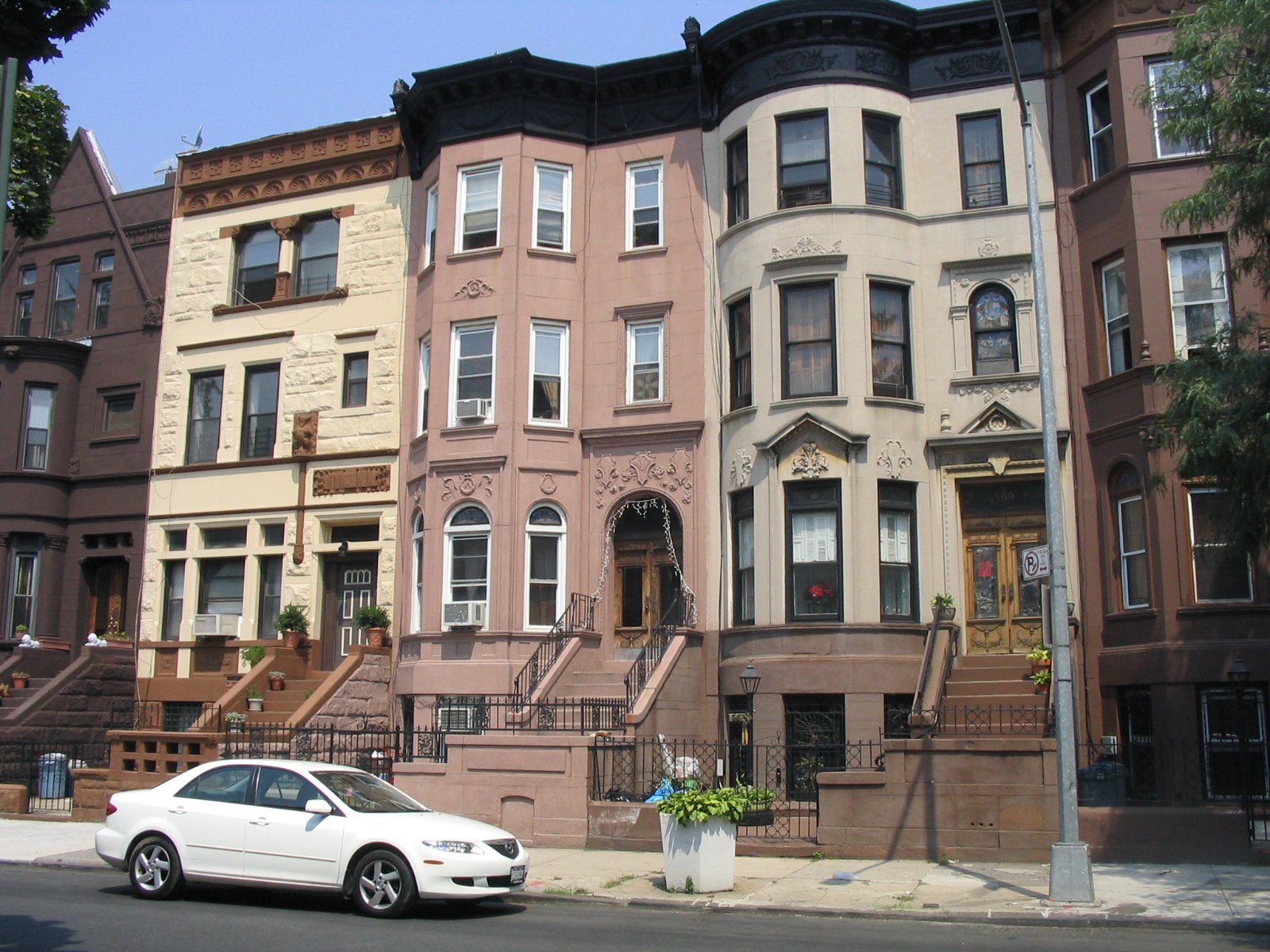
Bedford–Stuyvesant in New York became majority-Black in the mid-20th century, but its racial makeup has again shifted in the 21st century as a result of gentrification.

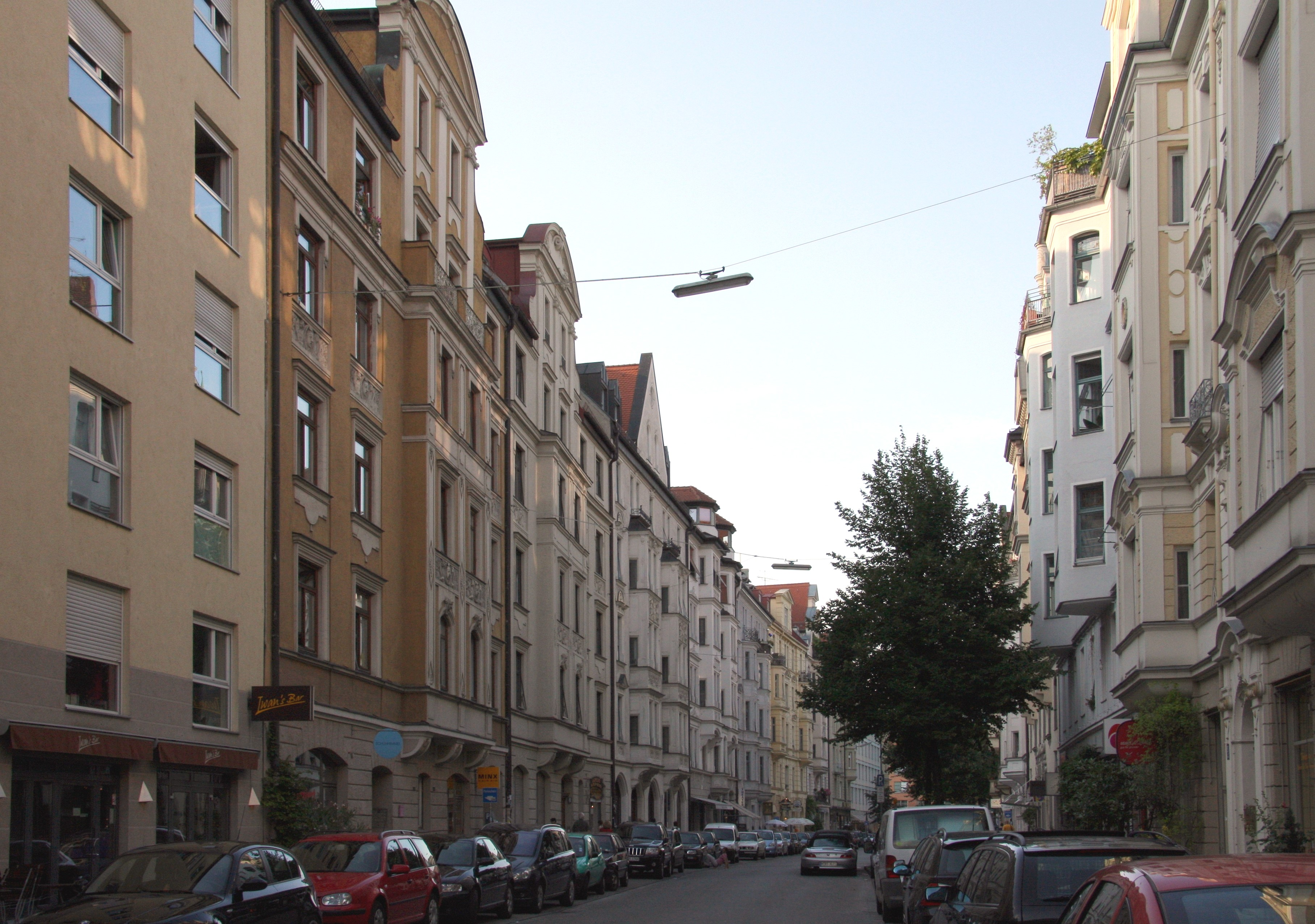
The Glockenbach district of Ludwigsvorstadt-Isarvorstadt in Munich, Germany

Phillip Clay's two-stage model of gentrification places artists as prototypical stage one or "marginal" gentrifiers. The National Endowment for the Arts did a study that linked the proportion of employed artists to the rate of inner city gentrification across a number of U.S. cities. Artists will typically accept the risks of rehabilitating deteriorated property, as well as having the time, skill, and ability to carry out these extensive renovations. David Ley states that the artist's critique of everyday life and search for meaning and renewal are what make them early recruits for gentrification.

The identity that residence in the inner city provides is important for the gentrifier, and this is particularly so in the artists' case. Their cultural emancipation from the bourgeois makes the central city an appealing alternative that distances them from the conformity and mundanity attributed to suburban life. They are quintessential city people, and the city is often a functional choice as well, for city life has advantages that include connections to customers and a closer proximity to a downtown art scene, all of which are more likely to be limited in a suburban setting. Ley's research cites a quote from a Vancouver printmaker talking about the importance of inner city life to an artist, that it has, "energy, intensity, hard to specify but hard to do without".

Ironically, these attributes that make artists characteristic marginal gentrifiers form the same foundations for their isolation as the gentrification process matures. The later stages of the process generate an influx of more affluent, "yuppie" residents. As the bohemian character of the community grows, it appeals "not only to committed participants, but also to sporadic consumers," and the rising property values that accompany this migration often lead to the eventual pushing out of the artists that began the movement in the first place. Sharon Zukin's study of SoHo in Manhattan, NYC was one of the most famous cases of this phenomenon. Throughout the 1960s and 1970s, Manhattan lofts in SoHo were converted en masse into housing for artists and hippies, and then their sub-culture's followers.

Stages of gentrification
Early stage	Transitional stage	Late stage
Artists, writers, musicians, affluent college students, LGBT, hipsters and political activists move in to a neighborhood for its affordability and tolerance.	Upper-middle-class professionals, often politically liberal-progressive (e.g. teachers, journalists, librarians), are attracted by the vibrancy created by the first arrivals.	Wealthier people (e.g. private sector managers) move in and real estate prices increase significantly. By this stage, high prices have excluded traditional residents and most of the types of people who arrived in stage 1 & 2.
Retail gentrification: Throughout the process, local businesses change to serve the higher incomes and different tastes of the gentrifying population.
Source: Caulfield & Peake (1996); Ley as cited in Boyd (2008); Rose (1996); and Lees, Slater & Wyly (2010) as cited in Kasman (2015).

=== LGBT community ===
Manuel Castells has researched the role of gay communities, especially in San Francisco, as early gentrifiers. The film Quinceañera depicts a similar situation in Los Angeles. Flag Wars (Linda Goode Bryant) shows tensions as of 2003 between bourgeois White LGBT-newcomers and a Black middle-class neighborhood in Columbus, Ohio. In Washington, D.C. Black and other ethnic minority mixed-income community residents accused both the affluent majority-White LGBT community and the closely linked hipster subculture of cultural displacement (or destruction of cultural heritage) under the guise of progressive inclusion and tolerance.

Research from Buenos Aires suggested that predominantly LGBT areas were only able to exist when the government allowed that area to be gentrified. As certain areas that are deemed progressive evolve and implement new housing and businesses, this expands the appeal of people looking to partake. Gentrification becomes a signal for institutions and businesses to measure potential bases. In cases of the LGBT community, successful businesses may be recognized as the ones planted in urban and progressive areas that are seen as safe. However, this comfort that invites marginalized communities puts previous communities living there at risk of displacement. As gay bars are a popular way in which the LGBT community may find security, the connection to gentrification for certain locations is critical for addressing the history of their establishment.

As of 2019, practically all historic gayborhoods have become less LGBT centric mainly due to the modern effects of gentrification. Gay neighborhoods may reveal elements of classism and racism perpetuated by affluent white gay men who settle in spaces that drive out people of color—through rent being raised in the area. Investing in inner-cities and urban areas, affluent queer people have built gay bars, bookstores, and other queer-centered establishments that then lead to the cities gaining attention and desirability—which then increases the rent of properties in the surrounding area. The rising cost to live in gayborhoods and government use of eminent domain have displaced many LGBT people and closed many LGBT-centric businesses.

== Control ==
To counter the gentrification of their mixed-populace communities, there are cases where residents formally organized themselves to develop the necessary socio-political strategies required to retain local affordable housing. The gentrification of a mixed-income community raises housing affordability to the fore of the community's politics. There are cities, municipalities, and counties which have countered gentrification with inclusionary zoning (inclusionary housing) ordinances requiring the apportionment of some new housing for the community's original low- and moderate-income residents. Inclusionary zoning is a new social concept in English speaking countries; there are few reports qualifying its effective or ineffective limitation of gentrification in the English literature. The basis of inclusionary zoning is partial replacement as opposed to displacement of the embedded communities.

German (speaking) municipalities have a strong legal role in zoning and on the real estate market in general and a long tradition of integrating social aspects in planning schemes and building regulations. The German approach uses en (milieu conservation municipal law), e.g. in Munich's Lehel district in use since the 1960s. The concepts of socially aware renovation and zoning of Bologna's old city in 1974 was used as role model in the Charta of Bologna, and recognized by the Council of Europe.

Most economists do not think anti-gentrification measures by the government make cities better off.

=== Other methods ===
==== Direct action and sabotage ====
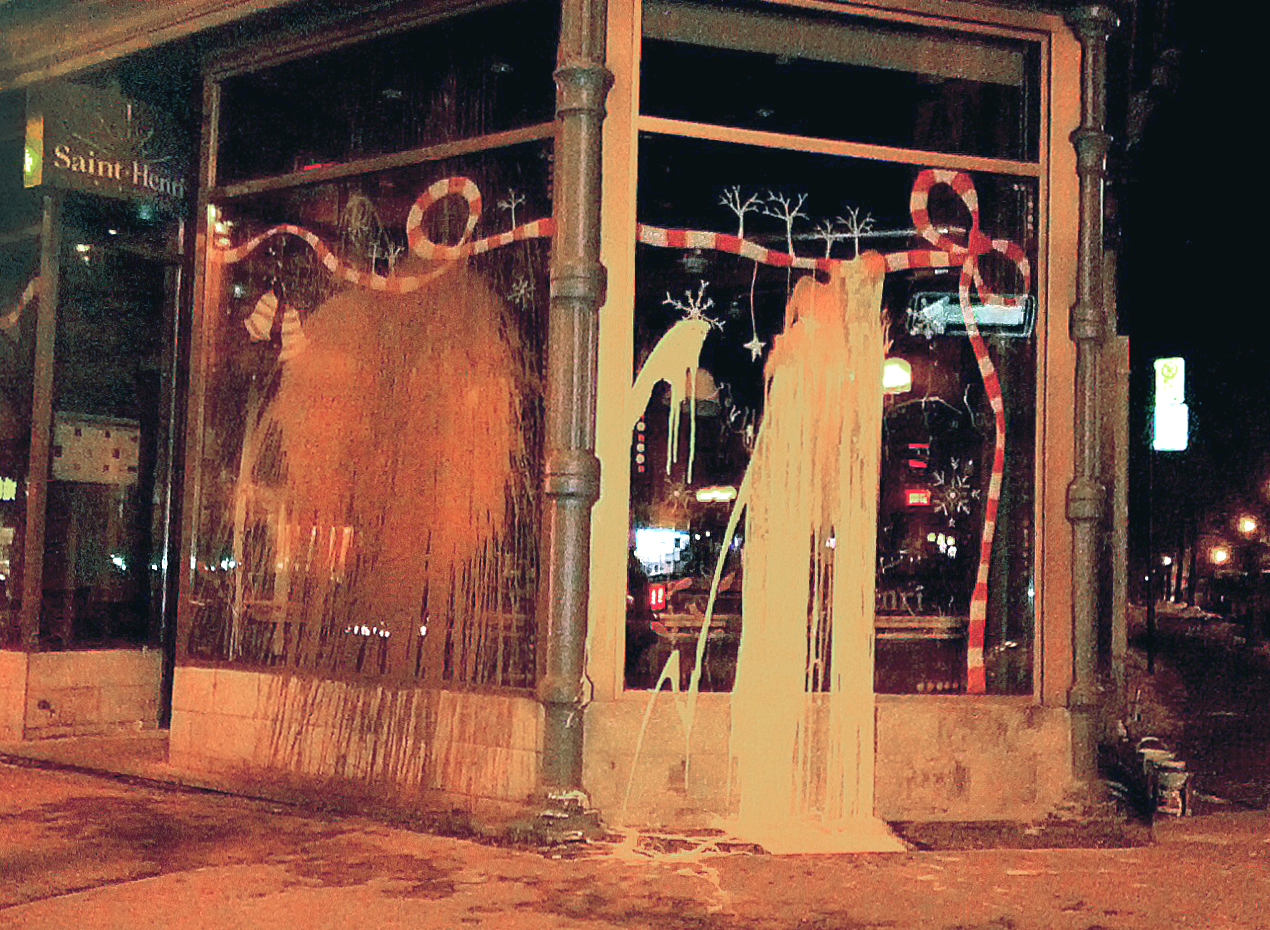
Coffee shop attacked with paint in alleged anti-gentrification attack in the St-Henri neighborhood of Montreal, January 2012

When wealthy people move into low-income working-class neighborhoods, the resulting class conflict sometimes involves vandalism and arson targeting the property of the gentrifiers. During the dot-com boom of the late 1990s, the gentrification of San Francisco's predominantly working class Mission District led some long-term neighborhood residents to create what they called the "Mission Yuppie Eradication Project". This group allegedly destroyed property and called for property destruction as part of a strategy to oppose gentrification. Their activities drew hostile responses from the San Francisco Police Department, real estate interests, and "work-within-the-system" housing activists.

Meibion Glyndŵr (Welsh: Sons of Glyndŵr), also known as the Valley Commandos, was a Welsh nationalist movement violently opposed to the loss of Welsh culture and language. They were formed in response to the housing crisis precipitated by large numbers of second homes being bought by the English which had increased house prices beyond the means of many locals. The group were responsible for setting fire to English-owned holiday homes in Wales from 1979 to the mid-1990s. In the first wave of attacks, eight holiday homes were destroyed in a month, and in 1980, Welsh Police carried out a series of raids in Operation Tân. Within the next ten years, some 220 properties were damaged by the campaign. Since the mid-1990s the group has been inactive and Welsh nationalist violence has ceased. In 1989 there was a movement that protested an influx of Swabians to Berlin who were deemed as gentrification drivers. Berlin saw the Schwabenhass and 2013 Spätzlerstreit controversies, which identified gentrification with newcomers from the German south.

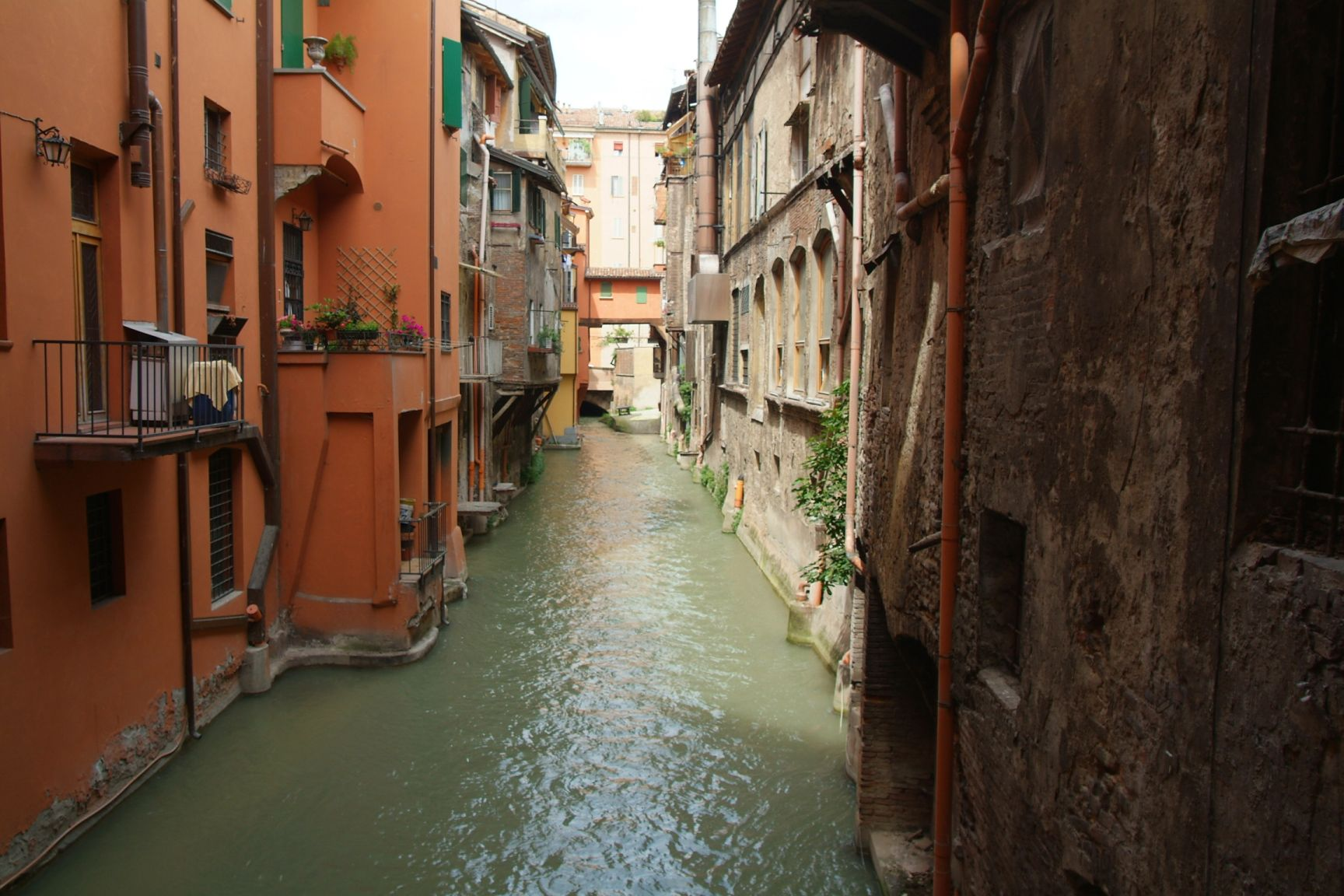
Canale delle Moline in Bologna

==== Zoning ordinances ====
Zoning ordinances and other urban planning tools can be used to recognize and support local business and industries. This can include requiring developers to continue with a current commercial tenant or offering development incentives for keeping existing businesses, as well as creating and maintaining industrial zones. Designing zoning to allow new housing near to a commercial corridor but not on top of it increases foot traffic to local businesses without redeveloping them. Businesses can become more stable by securing long-term commercial leases.

Although developers may recognize value in responding to living patterns, extensive zoning policies often prevent affordable homes from being constructed within urban development. Due to urban density restrictions, rezoning for residential development within urban living areas is difficult, which forces the builder and the market into urban sprawl and propagates the energy inefficiencies that come with distance from urban centers. In a recent example of restrictive urban zoning requirements, Arcadia Development Co. was prevented from rezoning a parcel for residential development in an urban setting within the city of Morgan Hill, California. With limitations established in the interest of public welfare, a density restriction was applied solely to Arcadia Development Co.'s parcel of development, excluding any planned residential expansion.

==== Community land trusts ====
Because land speculation tends to cause volatility in property values, removing real estate (houses, buildings, land) from the open market freezes property values, and thereby prevents the economic eviction of the community's poorer residents. The most common, formal legal mechanism for such stability in English speaking countries is the community land trust; moreover, many inclusionary zoning ordinances formally place the "inclusionary" housing units in a land trust. German municipalities and other cooperative actors have and maintain strong roles on the real estate markets in their realm.

==== Rent control ====
In jurisdictions where local or national government has these powers, there may be rent control regulations. Rent control restricts the rent that can be charged, so that incumbent tenants are not forced out by rising rents. Rent control laws are often paired with tenant protections, to prevent landlords from evicting incumbents in order to bring in new tenants at higher rents. If applicable to private landlords, it is a disincentive to speculating with property values, reduces the incidence of dwellings left empty, and limits availability of housing for new residents. If the law does not restrict the rent charged for dwellings (whether formerly owner-occupied or newly built) that come onto the rental market after its passage, rents in an area can still increase. Neighborhoods in southwestern Santa Monica and eastern West Hollywood, California, gentrified despite—or perhaps, because of—rent control.

In a state of rent control, a housing black market may develop, wherein landlords withdraw houses and apartments from the official market, making them available only upon payment of additional, "under the table" key money payments, fees, or bribes, thus undermining the rent-control law. Many such laws allow "vacancy decontrol", releasing a dwelling from rent control upon the tenant's leaving—resulting in steady losses of rent-controlled housing, ultimately rendering rent control laws ineffective in communities with a high rate of resident turnover. In other cases social housing owned by local authorities may be sold to tenants and then resold. Vacancy decontrol encourages landlords to find ways of shortening their residents' tenure, most aggressively through landlord harassment. To strengthen the rent-control laws of New York, housing advocates active in rent control in New York are attempting to repeal the vacancy decontrol clauses of rent-control laws. The state of Massachusetts abolished rent control in 1994; afterwards, rents rose, accelerating the pace of Boston's gentrification; however, the laws had protected few apartments, and confounding factors, such as a strong economy, had already been raising housing and rental prices.

== Examples ==
=== Inner London ===
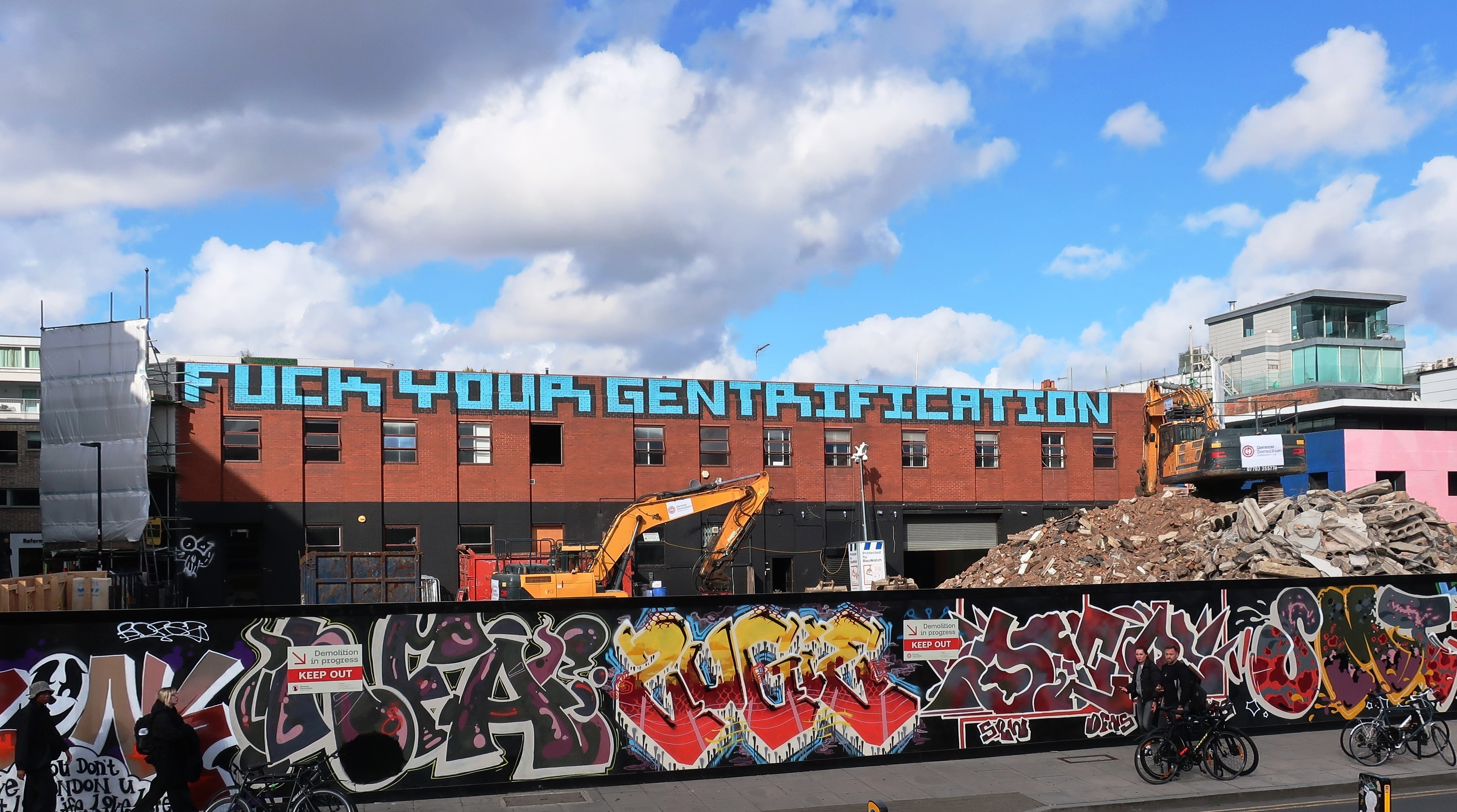
"Fuck Your Gentrification": anti-gentrification graffiti in Shoreditch, London, 2024

London is being "made over" by an urban centred middle class. In the post war era, upwardly mobile social classes tended to leave the city. Now, led by a new middle class, they are reconstructing much of inner London as a place both in which to work and live.

— Tim Butler, 1997

Gentrification is not a new phenomenon in Britain; in ancient Rome the shop-free forum was developed during the Roman Republican period, and in 2nd- and 3rd-century cities in Roman Britain there is evidence of small shops being replaced by large villas.

King's College London academic Loretta Lees reported that much of Inner London was undergoing "super-gentrification", where "a new group of super-wealthy professionals, working in the City of London [i.e. the financial industry], is slowly imposing its mark on this Inner London housing market, in a way that differentiates it, and them, from traditional gentrifiers, and from the traditional urban upper classes ... Super-gentrification is quite different from the classical version of gentrification. It's of a higher economic order; you need a much higher salary and bonuses to live in Barnsbury" (some two miles north of central London). Rising housing prices due to gentrification within London have led to a doubling of evictions done by private landlords and to a long-term decline in home ownership from the years 2003–2020.

Barnsbury was built around 1820, as a middle-class neighbourhood, but after the Second World War (1939–1945), many people moved to the suburbs. The upper and middle classes were fleeing from the working class residents of London, made possible by the modern railway. At the war's end, the great housing demand rendered Barnsbury a place of cheap housing, where most people shared accommodation. In the late 1950s and early 1960s, people moving into the area had to finance house renovations with their money, because banks rarely financed loans for Barnsbury. Moreover, the rehabilitating spark was The 1959 Housing Purchase and Housing Act, investing £100 million to rehabilitating old properties and infrastructure. As a result, the principal population influx occurred between 1961 and 1975; the UK Census reports that "between the years of 1961 and 1981, owner-occupation increased from 7 to 19 per cent, furnished rentals declined from 14 to 7 per cent, and unfurnished rentals declined from 61 to 6 per cent"; another example of urban gentrification is the super-gentrification, in the 1990s, of the neighboring working-class London Borough of Islington, where Prime Minister Tony Blair lived until his election in 1997. The conversion of older houses into flats emerged in the 1980s as developers saw the profits to be made. By the end of the 1980s, conversions were the single largest source of new dwellings in London.

=== Mexico City ===
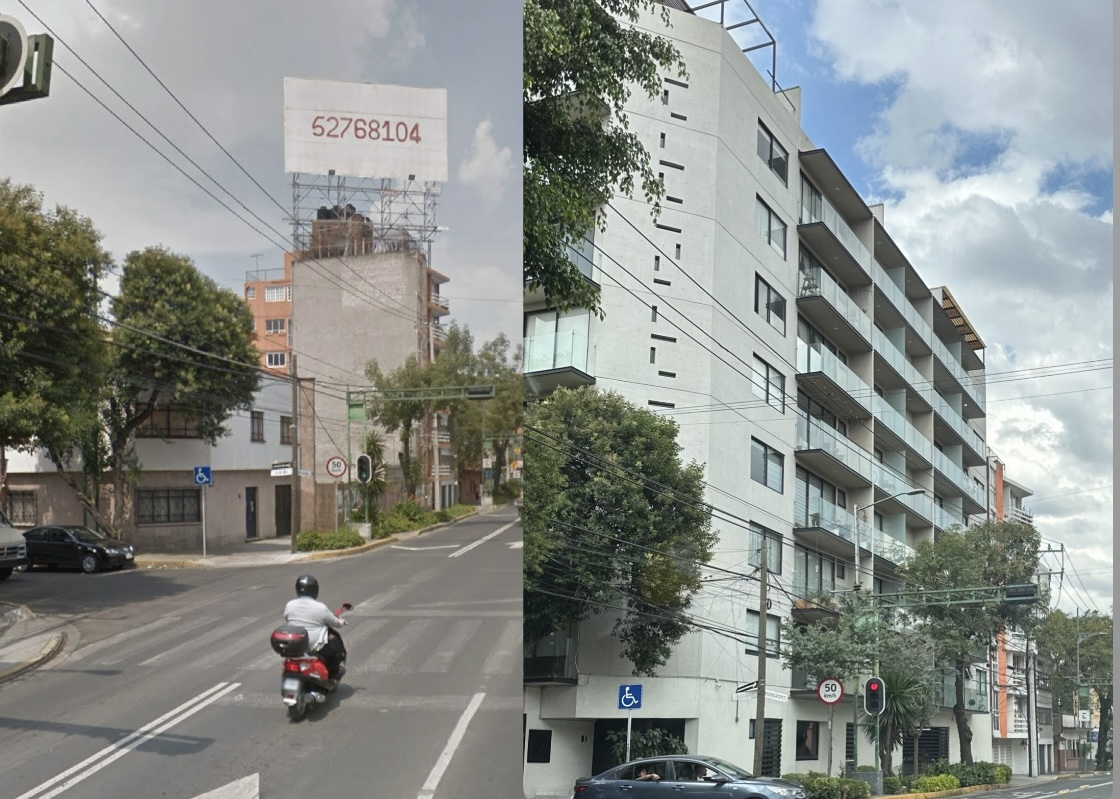
Gentrification seen in Colonia Portales

Mexico City has been an iconic example of an extensive metropolitan area since the 14th century when it became the largest city in the American continent. Its continuous population growth and concentration of economic and political power boomed in the 1930s when the country's involvement with global markets benefited the national financial industry. Currently the fifth largest city in the world, with a population of 21 million inhabitants (17.47% of national population) living in 16 districts and 59 municipalities, the urban area continues to expand receiving 1,100 new residents daily. The division of the city is derived from a strong socially and economically segregated population connected by its interdependence, that manifests into spatial arrangements where luxury areas coexist alongside slums. Its development around a core called "El Zocalo" derives from the historic, cultural and political relevance of a central plaza, as well as its contemporary concentration of economic power, currently housing 80% of all national firms.

In recent years, there has been a large uptick in new development in Mexico City, funded by state and private investments. These urban developments have been catered to elite communities mainly because this group economically supports the country (38% of the total national income is produced by the top 10%) and because the government, predominantly led by PRI (Partido Revolucionario Institucional), has maintained a profit-oriented policy perspective. Thus, these developments have not only led to an increase of population, traffic and pollution due to inefficient urban planning, but have also pushed great amounts of low-income families to the edges of the city and have challenged the safety of the 11.5 million people that economically depend on the underground sector. This issue adds to the already critical condition of 40% of the population living in informal settlements, often without access to sewage network and clean water. The geology of the city, located in a mountain valley, further contributes to unhealthy living conditions, concentrating high levels of air pollution.

The reality currently faced by the city is that of a historic rapid urban growth that has been unable to be adequately controlled and planned for, because of a corrupted and economically driven government, as well as a complex society that is strongly segregated. The negative effects of gentrification in Mexico City have been overlooked by the authorities, regarded as an inevitable process and argued to be in some cases nonexistent. In recent years, however, an array of proposals have been developed as a way to continue the gentrification of the city in a way that integrates and respects the rights of all citizens.

=== Canada ===
By the 1970s, investors in Toronto started buying up city houses—turning them into temporary rooming houses to make rental income until the desired price in the housing market for selling off the properties was reached (so that the rooming houses could be replaced with high income-oriented new housing)—a gentrification process called "blockbusting".

As of 2011, gentrification in Canada has proceeded quickly in older and denser cities such as Montreal, Toronto, Ottawa, Hamilton and Vancouver, but has barely begun in places such as Calgary, Edmonton, or Winnipeg, where suburban expansion is still the primary type of growth.

Canada's unique history and official multiculturalism policy has resulted in a different strain of gentrification than that of the United States. Some gentrification in Toronto has been sparked by the efforts of business improvement associations to market the ethnic communities in which they operate, such as in Corso Italia and Greektown.

In Quebec City, the Saint Roch neighbourhood in the city's lower town was previously predominantly working class and had gone through a period of decline. However, since the early to mid 2000s, the area has seen the transformation of the derelict buildings into condos and the opening of bars, restaurants and cafes, attracting young professionals into the area, but kicking out the residents from many generations back. Several software developers and gaming companies, such as Ubisoft and Beenox, have also opened offices there.

=== France ===
In Paris, most poor neighborhoods in the east have seen rising prices and the arrival of many wealthy residents. However, the process is mitigated by social housing and most cities tend to favor a "social mix"; that is, having both low and high-income residents in the same neighborhoods. But in practice, social housing does not cater to the poorest segment of the population; most residents of social dwellings are from the low-end of the middle class. As a result, a lot of poor people have been forced to go first to the close suburbs (1970 to 2000) and then more and more to remote "periurban areas" where public transport is almost nonexistent. The close suburbs (Saint-Ouen, Saint Denis, Aubervilliers, ...) are now in the early stages of gentrification although still poor. A lot of high-profile companies offering well-paid jobs have moved near Saint-Denis and new real-estate programs are underway to provide living areas close to the new jobs.

On the other side, the eviction of the poorest people to peri-urban areas since 2000 has been analyzed as the cause for the political far-right National Front. When the poor lived in the close suburbs, their problems were visible to the wealthy population. But the peri-urban population and its problem is thought to have been less emphasized by political leaders. Many of these people have labelled themselves "les invisibles". Many of them fled both rising costs in Paris and nearby suburbs, with an unsafe and unpleasant, environment to live in small houses in the countryside, but close to the city. But they did not factor in the huge financial and human cost of having up to four hours of commuting every day. Since then, more has been invested in the close suburbs (with new public transports set to open and urban renewal programs) they fled, but there is thought to be too little interest in these "invisible" plots of land. Since the close suburbs are now mostly inhabited by immigrants, some people have a strong resentment against immigration: some feel everything is done for new immigrants but nothing for the native French population.

This has been first documented in the book Plaidoyer pour une gauche populaire by think-tank Terra-Nova which had a major influence on all contestants in the presidential election (and at least, Sarkozy, François Hollande, and Marine Le Pen). This electorate voted overwhelmingly in favor of Marine Le Pen and Sarkozy while the city centers and close suburbs voted overwhelmingly for François Hollande.

Most major metropolises in France follow the same pattern with a belt of periurban development about 30 to 80 kilometers of the center where a lot of poor people moved in and are now trapped by rising fuel costs. These communities have been disrupted by the arrival of new people and already suffered of high unemployment due to the dwindling numbers of industrial jobs.

In smaller cities, the suburbs are still the principal place where people live and the center is more and more akin to a commercial estate where a lot of commercial activities take place but where few people live.

=== Honduras ===
Generally in Honduras the phenomenon of gentrification had not been so widespread because it had been a nation with a less developed economy than other countries in the Latin American region, however this phenomenon has begun to grow exponentially in the last decade. The main areas where the increase has been seen are the urban centers of its two most important cities, Tegucigalpa and San Pedro Sula. In the last years Honduras has become an emerging destination for digital nomads, these travelers are often attracted by the tropical climate, natural beauty, low cost of living compared to their home countries, and the ability to work remotely from attractive locations.

Some of the places that have suffered this phenomenon are the Bay islands, Valle de Angeles, Santa Lucia, and Copan Ruinas. The main reasons for this phenomenon in Honduras are real estate companies, foreign investors, real estate agencies, expatriates, and retirees. The case of the Bay Islands has been special due to the purchase of land mainly by high-income residents, hotel companies, and foreigners. Making the cost of housing for islanders more expensive and the cost of living has increased extensively, several fishing communities have denounced the increase in the cost of living in historically inhabited communities inhabited by them for generations. This phenomenon has even been seen in how more foreign currencies are used in the area, such as the dollar, which is the most used on the islands.

As for the urban centers of the country, Teguciglapa has seen the rehabilitation of old wealthy buildings in the historic center for the so-called Digital Nomads. The construction of new condominiums has also accelerated this phenomenon in the city as they are centers with an expensive level of rental. As for San Pedro Sula, this phenomenon is seen more in the Los Andes neighborhood has been accommodated for this kind of travelers.

=== South Africa ===
Gentrification in South Africa has been categorized into two waves for two different periods of time. Visser and Kotze find that the first wave occurred in the 1980s to the Post-Apartheid period, the second wave occurred during and after the 2000s. Both of these trends of gentrification has been analyzed and reviewed by scholars in different lenses. One view which Atkinson uses is that gentrification is purely the reflection of middle-class values on to a working-class neighborhood. The second view is the wider view is suggested by Visser and Kotze which views gentrification with inclusions of rural locations, infill housing, and luxury residency development. While Kotze and Visser find that gentrification has been under a provocative lens by media all over the world, South Africa's gentrification process was harder to identify because of the need to differentiate between gentrification and the change of conditions from the end of Apartheid.

Furthermore, the authors note that the pre-conditions for gentrification where events like tertiary decentralization (suburbanization of the service industry) and capital flight (disinvestment) were occurring, which caused scholars to ignore the subject of gentrification due to the normality of the process. Additionally, Kotze and Visser found that as state-run programs and private redevelopment programs began to focus on the pursuit of "global competitiveness" and well-rounded prosperity, it hid the underlying foundations of gentrification under the guise of redevelopment. As a result, the effect is similar to what Teppo and Millstein coins as the pursuit to moralize the narrative to legitimize the benefit to all people. This concurrently created an effect where Visser and Kotze conclude that the perceived gentrification was only the fact that the target market was people commonly associated with gentrification. As Visser and Kotze states, "It appears as if apartheid red-lining on racial grounds has been replaced by a financially exclusive property market that entrenches prosperity and privilege."

Generally, Atkinson observes that when looking at scholarly discourse for the gentrification and rapid urbanization of South Africa, the main focus is not on the smaller towns of South Africa. This is a large issue because small towns are magnets for poorer people and repellants for skilled people. In one study, Atkinson dives into research in a small town, Aberdeen in the East Cape. Also as previously mentioned, Atkinson finds that this area has shown signs of gentrification. This is due to redevelopment which indicates clearly the reflection of middle-class values. In this urbanization of the area, Atkinson finds that there is clear dependence on state-programs which leads to further development and growth of the area, this multiplier of the economy would present a benefit of gentrification. The author then attributes the positive growth with the benefits in gentrification by examining the increase in housing opportunities.

Then, by surveying the recent newcomers to the area, Atkinson's research found that there is confidence for local economic growth which further indicated shifts to middle-class values, therefore, gentrification. This research also demonstrated growth in "modernizers" which demonstrate the general belief of gentrification where there is value for architectural heritage as well as urban development. Lastly, Atkinson's study found that the gentrification effects of growth can be accredited to the increase in unique or scarce skills to the municipality which revived interest in the growth of the local area. This gentrification of the area would then negative impact the poorer demographics where the increase in housing would displace and exclude them from receiving benefits. In conclusion, after studying the small town of Aberdeen, Atkinson finds that "Paradoxically, it is possible that gentrification could promote economic growth and employment while simultaneously increasing class inequality."

Historically, Garside notes that due to the Apartheid, the inner cities of Cape Town was cleared of non-white communities. But because of the Group Areas Act, some certain locations were controlled for such communities. Specifically, Woodstock has been a racially mixed community with a compilation of European settlers (such as the Afrikaners and the 1820 Settlers), Eastern European Jews, immigrants from Angola and Mozambique, and the coloured Capetonians. For generations, these groups lived in this area characterizing it be a working-class neighborhood. But as the times changed and restrictions were relaxed, Teppo and Millstein observes that the community became more and more "gray" as in a combination between white and mixed communities.

Then this progression continues to which Garside finds that an exaggeration as more middle-income groups moved into the area. This emigration resulted in a distinct split between Upper Woodstock and Lower Woodstock. Coupled with the emergence of a strong middle-class in South Africa, Woodstock became a destination for convenience and growth. While Upper Woodstock was a predominantly white area, Lower Woodstock then received the attention of the mixed middle-income community. This increase in demand for housing gave landlords incentives to raise prices to profit off of the growing wealth in the area. The 400–500% surge in the housing market for Woodstock thus displaced and excluded the working-class and retired who previously resided in the community. Furthermore, Garside states that the progression of gentrification was accentuated by the fact that most of the previous residents would only be renting their living space. Both Teppo and Millstein would find that this displacement of large swaths of communities would increase demand in other areas of Woodstock or inner city slums.

The Bo-Kaap pocket of Cape Town nestles against the slopes of Signal Hill. It has traditionally been occupied by members of South Africa's minority, mainly Muslim, Cape Malay community. These descendants of artisans and political captives, brought to the Cape as early as the 18th century as slaves and indentured workers, were housed in small barrack-like abodes on what used to be the outskirts of town. As the city limits increased, property in the Bo-Kaap became very sought after, not only for its location but also for its picturesque cobble-streets and narrow avenues. Increasingly, this close-knit community is "facing a slow dissolution of its distinctive character as wealthy outsiders move into the suburb to snap up homes in the City Bowl at cut-rate prices". Inter-community conflict has also arisen as some residents object to the sale of buildings and the resultant eviction of long-term residents.

In another specific case, Millstein and Teppo discovered that working-class residents would become embattled with their landlords. On Gympie Street, which has been labeled as the most dangerous street in Cape Town, it was home to many of the working-class. But as gentrification occurred, landlords brought along tactics to evict low-paying tenants through non-payment clauses. One landlord who bought a building cheaply from an auction, immediately raised the rental price which would then proceed to court for evictions. But, the tenants were able to group together to make a strong case to win. Regardless of the outcome, the landlord resorted to turning off both power and water in the building. The tenants then were exhausted out of motivation to fight. One tenant described it as similar to living in a shack which would be the future living space one displaced. Closing, the Teppo and Millstein's research established that gentrification's progress for urban development would coincide with a large displacement of the poorer communities which also excluded them from any benefits to gentrification. The authors state, "The end results are the same in both cases: in the aftermath of the South African negotiated revolution, the elite colonize the urban areas from those who are less privileged, claiming the city for themselves."

=== Italy ===
In Italy, similarly to other countries around the world, the phenomenon of gentrification is proceeding in the largest cities, such as Milan, Turin, Genoa and Rome.

In Milan, gentrification is changing the look of some semi-central neighborhoods, just outside the inner ring road (called "Cerchia dei Bastioni"), particularly of former working class and industrial areas. One of the most well known cases is the neighborhood of Isola. Despite its position, this area has been for a long time considered as a suburb since it has been an isolated part of the city, due to the physical barriers such as the railways and the Naviglio Martesana. In the 1950s, a new business district was built not far from this area, but Isola remained a distant and low-class area. In the 2000s vigorous efforts to make Isola as a symbolic place of the Milan of the future were carried out and, with this aim, the Porta Garibaldi-Isola districts became attractors for stylists and artists. Moreover, in the second half of the same decade, a massive urban rebranding project, known as Progetto Porta Nuova, started and the neighbourhood of Isola, despite the compliances residents have had, has been one of the regenerated areas, with the Bosco Verticale and the new Giardini di Porta Nuova.

Another semi-central district that has undergone this phenomenon in Milan is Zona Tortona. Former industrial area situated behind Porta Genova station, Zona Tortona is nowadays the Mecca of Italian design and annually hosts some of the most important events of the Milan Design Week during which more than 150 expositors, such as Superstudio, take part. In Zona Tortona, some of important landmarks, related to culture, design and arts, are located such as Fondazione Pomodoro, the Armani/Silos, Spazio A. and MUDEC.

Going towards the outskirts of the city, other gentrified areas of Milan are Lambrate-Ventura (where others events of the Milan Design Week are hosted), Bicocca and Bovisa (in which universities have contributed to the gentrification of the areas), Sesto San Giovanni, Via Sammartini, and the so-called NoLo district (which means "Nord di Loreto").

=== Poland ===
In Poland, gentrification is proceeding mostly in the big cities like Warsaw, Łódź, Kraków, Metropolis GZM, Poznań, and Wrocław. The reason of this is both de-industrialisation and poor condition of some residential areas.

The biggest European ongoing gentrification process has been occurring in Łódź from the beginning of the 2010s. Huge unemployment (24% in the 1990s) caused by the downfall of the garment industry created both economic and social problems. Moreover, vast majority of industrial and housing facilities had been constructed in the late 19th century and the renovation was neglected after World War II. Łódź authorities rebuilt the industrial district into the New City Center. This included re-purposing buildings including the former electrical power and heating station into the Łódź Fabryczna railway station and the EC1 Science Museum.

There are other significant gentrifications in Poland, such as:

- Kraków – the Jewish district Kazimierz, gentrification financed mostly by private investors.
- Poznań – build up Law Department of Adam Mickiewicz University in the post military facility.
- Wrocław – Nadodrze and Nowe Żerniki districts; residential area drown upon the modernism concepts.
- Wałbrzych, Julia coal mine – adaptation post-industrial buildings to art and cultural facilities.
- Warsaw, Praga-Północ district.

Nowadays the Polish government has started National Revitalization Plan which ensures financial support to municipal gentrification programs.

=== Russia ===
Central Moscow rapidly gentrified following the change from the communist central-planning policies of the Soviet era to the market economy of the post-Soviet Russian government.

=== United States ===
From a market standpoint, there are two main requirements that are met by the U.S. cities that undergo substantial effects of gentrification. These are: an excess supply of deteriorated housing in central areas, as well as a considerable growth in the availability of professional jobs located in central business districts. These conditions have been met in the U.S. largely as a result of suburbanization and other postindustrial phenomena. There have been three chronological waves of gentrification in the U.S. starting from the 1960s.

The first wave came in the 1960s and early 1970s, led by governments trying to reduce the disinvestment that was taking place in inner-city urban areas. Additionally, starting in the 1960s and 1970s, U.S. industry has created a surplus of housing units as construction of new homes has far surpassed the rate of national household growth. However, the market forces that are dictated by an excess supply cannot fully explain the geographical specificity of gentrification in the U.S., for there are many large cities that meet this requirement and have not exhibited gentrification.

The missing link is another factor that can be explained by particular, necessary demand forces. In U.S. cities in the time period from 1970 to 1978, growth of the central business district at around 20% did not dictate conditions for gentrification, while growth at or above 33% yielded appreciably larger gentrification activity. Central business district growth will activate gentrification in the presence of a surplus in the inner city housing market. The 1970s brought the more "widespread" second wave of gentrification, and was sometimes linked to the development of artist communities like SoHo in New York.

In the U.S., the conditions for gentrification were generated by the economic transition from manufacturing to post-industrial service economies. The post-World War II economy experienced a service revolution, which created white-collar jobs and larger opportunities for women in the work force, as well as an expansion in the importance of centralized administrative and cooperate activities. This increased the demand for inner city residences, which were readily available cheaply after much of the movement towards central city abandonment of the 1950s. The coupling of these movements is what became the trigger for the expansive gentrification of U.S. cities, including Atlanta, Baltimore, Boston, Philadelphia, St. Louis, and Washington, D.C.

The third wave of gentrification occurred in most major cities in the late 1990s and was driven by large-scale developments, public-private partnerships, and government policies. Measurement of the rate of gentrification during the period from 1990 to 2010 in 50 U.S. cities showed an increase in the rate of gentrification from 9% in the decade of the 1990s to 20% in the decade from 2000 to 2010 with 8% of the urban neighborhoods in the 50 cities being affected.

Cities with a rate of gentrification of ≈40% or more in the decade from 2000 to 2010 included:

- Portland, Oregon 58.1%
- Washington, D.C. 51.9%
- Minneapolis 50.6%
- Seattle 50%
- Atlanta 46.2%
- Virginia Beach 46.2%
- Denver 42.1%
- Austin 39.7%

Cities with a rate of less than 10% in the decade from 2000 to 2010 included:

- Memphis 8.8%
- Tucson 8.3%
- Tulsa 7%
- Cleveland 6.7%
- Detroit 2.8%
- Las Vegas 2%
- El Paso 0%
- Arlington, Texas 0%

== Anti-gentrification protests ==
=== Benezet Court, Inc. (Philadelphia, PA) ===
Society Hill, one of the oldest neighborhoods in Philadelphia, PA, was designated for urban renewal in the late 1950s. This urban renewal called for renovations of buildings that were home to families of color. While it was initially promised that the families would not have to leave by the OHA (Octavia Hill Association), they were later evicted and it was determined that it would not be possible to renovate these buildings while keeping the price of rent low. An African American woman named Dorothy Miller (née Stroud) became the face of the Octavia Hill Seven, a moniker given to the seven households who resisted the relocation. Philip Price Jr. was a lawyer who joined Miller in the fight for affordable housing. With his leadership, several residents formed an SHCA committee and subsequently a nonprofit organization to consider options for rehabilitation or new construction for Miller and her neighbors. They named their organization Benezet Court, Inc., after an early abolitionist in Philadelphia. Eventually, the organization was able to achieve affordable housing options in the neighborhood.

=== Movement for Justice in El Barrio ===
The Movement for Justice in El Barrio is an immigrant-led, organized group of tenants who resist against gentrification in East Harlem, New York. This movement has 954 members and 95 building communities. On 8 April 2006, the MJB gathered people to protest in the New York City Hall against an investment bank in the United Kingdom that purchased 47 buildings and 1,137 homes in East Harlem. News of these protests reached England, Scotland, France and Spain. MJB made a call to action that everyone, internationally, should fight against gentrification. This movement gained international traction and also became known as the International Campaign Against Gentrification in El Barrio.

=== Cereal Killer Cafe protest ===
On 26 September 2015, a cereal cafe in East London called Cereal Killer Cafe was attacked by a large group of anti-gentrification protestors. These protestors carried with them a pig's head and torches, stating that they were tired of unaffordable luxury flats going into their neighborhoods. These protestors were alleged to be primarily "middle-class academics", who were upset by the lack of community and culture that they once saw in East London. People targeted Cereal Killer Cafe during their protest because of an alleged article in which one of the brothers with ownership of the cafe had said marking up prices was necessary as a business in the area. After the attack on the cafe, users on Twitter were upset that protestors had targeted a small business as the focus of their demonstration, as opposed to a larger one.

=== San Francisco tech bus protests ===
The San Francisco tech bus protests occurred in late 2013 in the San Francisco Bay Area in the United States, protesting against tech shuttle buses that take employees to and from their homes in the Bay Area to workplaces in Silicon Valley. Protestors said the buses were symbolic of the gentrification occurring in the city, rising rent prices, and the displacement of small businesses. This protest gained global attention and also inspired anti-gentrification movements in East London.

=== ink! Coffee Protest (Denver, Colorado) ===
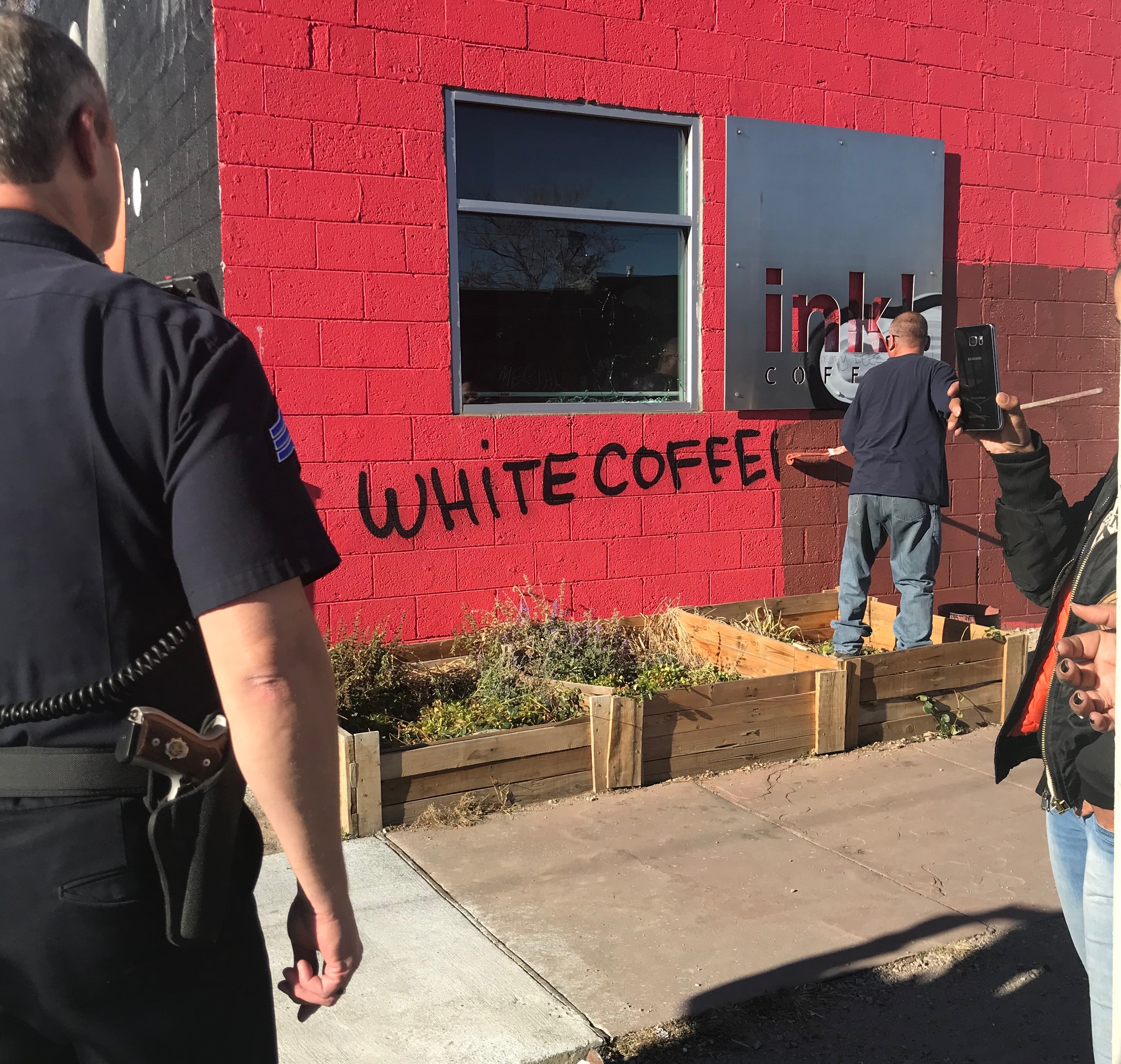
Clean up effort by the City of Denver at ink! Coffee in Five Points, Denver. The coffee shop was vandalized following the debut of a controversial ad campaign.

On 22 November 2017, ink! Coffee, a small coffee shop, placed a manufactured metal Sandwich board sign on the sidewalk outside one of their Denver locations in the historic Five Points, Denver neighborhood. The sign said "Happily gentrifying the neighborhood since 2014" on one side and "Nothing says gentrification like being able to order a cortado" on the other side.

Ink's ad ignited outrage and garnered national attention when a picture of the sign was shared on social media by a prominent Denver writer, Ru Johnson. The picture of the sign quickly went viral accumulating critical comments and negative reviews. Ink! responded to the social media outrage with a public apology followed by a lengthier apology from its founder, Keith Herbert. Ink's public apology deemed the sign a bad joke causing even more outrage on social media. The ad design was created by a Five Points, Denver firm named Cultivator Advertising & Design. The advertising firm responded to the public's dismay by issuing an ill-received social media apology, "An Open Letter to Our Neighbors".

The night following the debut of ink's controversial ad campaign their Five Points, Denver location was vandalized. A window was broken and the words "WHITE COFFEE" among others were spray-painted onto the front of the building. Protest organizers gathered at the coffee shop daily following the controversy. The coffee shop was closed for business the entire holiday weekend following the scandal.

At least 200 people attended a protest and boycott event on 25 November 2017 outside of ink!'s Five Points location. News of the controversy was covered by media outlets worldwide.

=== Hamilton Locke Street Vandalism ===
On 3 March 2018, an anarchist group vandalized coffee shops, luxury automobiles, and restaurants on Locke Street in Hamilton, Ontario. The attack was linked to an anarchist group in the city known as The Tower, that aimed to highlight issues of gentrification in Hamilton through vandalizing new businesses. On 7 March, The Tower's free community library was vandalized by what the group referred to as "far-right goons". Investigation followed, with arrests related to the Locke Street vandalism being made by Hamilton police in April and June 2018.

=== Condesa and Roma violent clashes (Mexico City, 4–5 July, 2025) ===
On 4 and 5 July 2025 Protests broke out in Mexico City denouncing gentrification and rent increases. Many Mexican locals accused American residents of increasing rent value to that about three times than what a local Mexican could afford. Violent protests and clashes between protesters and tourists took place in Condesa and Roma districts.

== Litigation ==
Hwang discovers factors that can cause neighborhood changes: Households might be more attracted to a neighborhood because of (1) increases in access value, (2) increases in amenity value, or (3) decline in housing prices relative to other neighborhoods. These factors attract investors and eventually leads to gentrification.

Gentrification can promote neighborhood revitalization and desegregation. Because of this, a gentrification-as-integration model has been supported to stop population loss, and to rebuild low-income neighborhoods.

Gentrification has been called the savior of cities from urban crisis because it has led to urban revitalization, which promotes the economy of struggling cities.

The Fair Housing Act can be used as litigation against gentrification because the urban development process of higher-income individuals into lower-income neighborhoods leads to displacement.

== See also ==
- Black flight
- Blue space
- Deindustrialization
- Development-induced displacement
- Infill
- Settlement movement
- The Last Block in Harlem (2009 book)
- Trailer trash
- Urban green space
- Urban renewal
- Urban theory
- Urban vitality
- White flight
- Environmental racism
- Environmental justice
- Environmental gentrification
- Cost of poverty
- Urban retrofitting
