= Max Lock =

Max Lock (1909–1988) was a British postwar urban planner who emphasised the importance of incorporating social research in the planning process. His most notable contributions were associated with planning in Middlesbrough, where he worked with Griselda Rowntree and Ruth Glass on the 1944 Middlesbrough Survey, and Hull. Lock's Hull work achieved acclaim with a 1943 London exhibition at the Housing Centre opened by the Minister of Town and Country Planning and in The Architects' Journal.

Darling and Whitworth describe Lock's approach to planning as the most Geddesian of the post-war planners in the UK. Other key features of his approach were to include considerations of a town's hinterland in the planning process, to incorporate insights from other disciplines, to blend both physical and social aspects, using surveys, interviews, community involvement, map overlays, topic reports, and photographs. This was a process involving Civic Diagnosis. The aim was to achieve workable and acceptable plans. This could be achieved by having the public closely involved in a consultation process and making presentations accessible to them and to the press.

The Max Lock Centre at the University of Westminster is named in his honour and holds his archive.

== Selected publications ==
- Lock, M. (1943) Civic diagnosis: a blitzed city analysed, Housing Centre/Hull Regional Survey, Hull
- Lock, M. (ed.) (1946), The County Borough of Middlesbrough: Survey and Plan, The Middlesbrough Corporation, Middlesbrough
- Lock, M. (1967) Kaduna, 1917, 1967, 2017. A survey and plan of the capital territory for the government of Northern Nigeria, Faber and Faber, London
