= The Last Black Man in San Francisco =

2019 film by Joe Talbot

- Theatrical release poster
- Directed by: Joe Talbot
- Screenplay by: Joe Talbot; Rob Richert
- Story by: Jimmie Fails; Joe Talbot
- Produced by: Khaliah Neal; Joe Talbot; Dede Gardner; Jeremy Kleiner; Christina Oh
- Starring: Jimmie Fails; Jonathan Majors; Tichina Arnold; Rob Morgan; Mike Epps; Finn Wittrock; Danny Glover
- Cinematography: Adam Newport-Berra
- Edited by: David Marks
- Music by: Emile Mosseri
- Production companies: Plan B Entertainment; Longshot Features; Mavia Entertainment
- Distributed by: A24
- Release dates: January 26, 2019 (Sundance); June 7, 2019 (United States)
- Running time: 120 minutes
- Country: United States
- Language: English
- Budget: $3 million
- Box office: $4.6 million

The Last Black Man in San Francisco is a 2019 American drama film directed and produced by Joe Talbot in his directorial debut. He wrote the screenplay with Rob Richert and the story with Jimmie Fails, on whose life it is partly based. It stars Fails, Jonathan Majors, Tichina Arnold, Rob Morgan, Mike Epps, Finn Wittrock, and Danny Glover.

It premiered at the Sundance Film Festival on January 26, 2019, where it won awards for Best Directing and a Special Jury Prize for Creative Collaboration. It was released in the United States on June 7, 2019, by A24.

== Plot ==
Jimmie Fails is a young man living in Bayview–Hunters Point, San Francisco. He spends his time wandering around town with his best friend Montgomery (Mont) Allen, with whom he lives, along with Mont's grandfather. Jimmie waits for the bus with Mont every day, during which they see various states of change in the city and protesters trying to stop it. They skateboard to a Victorian house in the city's Fillmore District where Jimmie grew up. Jimmie says it was built by his grandfather in 1946, who opted to build on an empty lot rather than buy one of the houses made available due to the wartime internment of Japanese Americans. The home is currently occupied by an older white couple. Jimmie often laments to Mont about how they don't take care of the house, and does his best to maintain it himself. One day, Jimmie and Mont visit the house to find the woman crying on her husband's shoulder and movers taking the couple's things away. They learn from a mover that the woman's mother died and that she and her sister are now fighting over the house.

Jimmie and Mont visit Clayton Newsom, a realtor, to inquire about the home. Newsom is not aware of the current situation, but is very familiar with the house. He tells them it "sounds like an estate thing" in which case the home might stay empty for years until the inheritance is settled. Jimmie and Mont use this opportunity to visit the now-vacant house, exploring it in its entirety. Deciding to take up residence there, they visit Jimmie's aunt Wanda, who gives them the furniture she and the family had when they lived there. With the help of Wanda's husband Ricky, they take everything back to the house and move it in.

One night, Mont invites Kofi, a childhood friend of Jimmie's and his, to the house, and they enjoy a night of relaxation. However, the next day, Kofi says hurtful things to Jimmie about his father in order to appear dominant after being called "effeminate" by his friends. Jimmie and Mont later learn from Kofi's friends that Kofi has been killed by a man with whom he had a scuffle. On returning to the house, they find that their possessions have been thrown out onto the sidewalk, and find a For Sale sign posted by Newsom. Feeling betrayed, Jimmie retaliates by taking all the furniture back inside. He also visits a bank in an unsuccessful attempt to purchase the home. Mont, however, goes back to Newsom, who reveals that the house wasn't built by Jimmie's grandfather; he has the deed proving that it was actually built in the 1850s.

Mont writes a play about the aftermath of Kofi's death, and Jimmie advertises that it will be performed in the house's uppermost tower. On the day of the performance, Jimmie's estranged father appears. During the performance, Mont shows social media posts about Kofi's death, all of which prove, he proclaims, that these people never really knew Kofi. He asks people in the crowd to recount their opinions of Kofi, including Jimmie. Jimmie says that even though the last things Kofi said to him were mean, his experience with him in a group home was friendly, and says, "People aren't one thing". Mont then confronts Jimmie with the truth that Jimmie's grandfather did not build the house. This angers Jimmie, who storms out, followed by the rest of the audience. Jimmie reflects with Wanda, and she reassures him that he can leave San Francisco, as "But if you leave it's not your loss. It's San Francisco's".

Jimmie reunites with Mont at the dock, admitting that he'd known all along that his grandfather hadn't built the house. He watches TV with Mont and Grandpa Allen before going to bed. Mont wakes up and finds Jimmie gone, with a note saying he "didn't know how to say goodbye" and thanking Mont for being his best friend. Mont is left alone, and while he continues various activities that the two always shared, they no longer bring him the same joy when done alone. He stands alone on the dock, staring into the distance. Jimmie is far away, rowing in the water outside the Golden Gate Bridge.

== Cast ==
- Jimmie Fails as himself
- Jonathan Majors as Mont Allen
- Danny Glover as Grandpa Allen
- Tichina Arnold as Wanda Fails
- Rob Morgan as James Sr.
- Mike Epps as Bobby
- Finn Wittrock as Clayton Newsom
- Isiain Lalime as Gunna (of Chorus)
- Jamal Trulove as Kofi (of Chorus)
- Jordan Gomes as Jordan (of Chorus)
- Maximilienne Ewalt as Mary
- Jello Biafra as Tour Guide
- San Quinn as Grown Ass Man
- Daewon Song as Uncle Ricky
- Andy Roy as Andy
- Willie Hen as The Preacher
- Thora Birch as Becca
- Tonya Glanz as Nina
- Sergio Gonzalez as Banker
- Wynner Gonzalez as Andrew Joseph

Michael Marshall as Street Performer

== Production ==
Joe Talbot and Jimmie Fails grew up together in San Francisco, and first discussed the possibility of making the movie as teenagers. However, they found it difficult to make the film in the city due to the lack of a film scene within the region and neither of them had any proper film training nor knew anybody within the industry. Talbot got some initial advice on how to start from a cold email to Barry Jenkins, who shot Medicine for Melancholy (2008) in San Francisco, before he left to shoot Moonlight (2016).

In May 2015, the two shot a preview trailer to raise funds for the making of the film and launched a successful Kickstarter campaign that ultimately surpassed their goal of $50,000 by more than $25,000. Within a month, 1,500 contributors backed the campaign totaling a little over $75,000. The campaign garnered film industry interest as well as national press, and through viral success cemented Fails, who was the face of the #lastblackman fundraising campaign, as a local San Francisco figure. The production also participated in the San Francisco "Scene in San Francisco Incentive Program" administered by the San Francisco Film Commission.

When Fails and Talbot's short film, American Paradise, made it to 2017 Sundance Film Festival, they met Christina Oh of Plan B Entertainment, who later made introductions for Talbot and producer, Khaliah Neal, to the rest of the company at a shooting for Ad Astra (2019). Jeremy Kleiner, of Plan B, helped pick up the film for production. Principal photography began in April 2018.

In May 2018, it was officially announced that Jonathan Majors, Danny Glover, Tichina Arnold, Rob Morgan, Mike Epps, Finn Wittrock and Thora Birch had joined the cast of the film, with Khaliah Neal producing the film alongside Plan B Entertainment and A24 distributing.

The creative team had wanted to cast someone from San Francisco in the role of Kofi, the childhood friend who struggles to be vulnerable with his peers. They met Jamal Trulove at an after-school program in San Francisco while casting for child extras. Trulove was previously falsely charged with murdering his friend in 2007. He was granted a retrial in 2015 and was subsequently acquitted. The San Francisco Board of Supervisors later approved a $13.1 million settlement to him for being framed for murder by the police. Given his background and personal resonance for the role, Trulove was cast on the spot that day.

One of the filming locations was Shipwright's Cottage. Constant demolitions and alterations of San Francisco sites complicated the film production. Talbot is cognizant of the geographical inaccuracies of the film, likening it to Bullitt (1968) which was also filmed in San Francisco.

The film was heavily influenced by the 2001 film Ghost World, also about two outsider friends who don't fit in to their cities and wander throughout, which Talbot was introduced to at age 15. As an homage to that film, Talbot asked actress Thora Birch to appear in a cameo appearance, and notes the connection between her character of Enid and that of Jimmie: "I always felt her character and Jimmy are similar in a lot of ways, and she got that immediately," Talbot said. "She and I would joke like, at the end of Ghost World when she gets on the bus, it’s like she never got off the bus and wound up in San Francisco working a tech job she hates." Talbot also discussed the connection further: "Thora is one of the great actresses of her generation and her work, in part, inspired me to want to make films. Her performance in Ghost World made me feel seen as a teenager when I was a bit lost," Talbot explained. "At the end of that film, Thora rides a bus off into the sunset. In our film, we meet her character on a bus in the heart of San Francisco—almost as if she kept riding it all these years, and somehow wound up in the Bay Area working a tech job she loathed. Her exchange that follows with Jimmie, however brief, has been written about and quoted more than any other part of the film."

== Release ==
The film had its world premiere at the Sundance Film Festival on January 26, 2019. It was released in the United States by A24 on June 7, 2019 having previously been scheduled to be released on June 14. It was released on VOD by Lionsgate Home Entertainment on August 13, 2019.

== Reception ==
=== Box office ===
The Last Black Man in San Francisco grossed $4.5 million in United States and Canada and $122,123 in other territories for a total worldwide of $4.6 million, against a production budget of $3 million.

=== Critical response ===
On the review aggregator Rotten Tomatoes, the film holds an approval rating of 93% based on 213 reviews, with an average rating of 8.3/10. The site's critical consensus reads, "An affecting story powerfully told, The Last Black Man in San Francisco immediately establishes director Joe Talbot as a filmmaker to watch." On Metacritic, the film has a weighted average score of 83 out of 100, based on 39 critics, indicating "universal acclaim".

In her New York Times review, Manohla Dargis made the film a NYT Critics Pick and called it "ravishing, haunting and exultant." The Los Angeles Times's Justin Chang called the film "a gorgeous, moving ode to a city in flux." The Hollywood Reporter's Todd McCarthy said it was "by far the best narrative film I saw [at Sundance]. ... Every scene is fresh and unpredictable, visual poetry and realism are exquisitely woven together." Rolling Stone called it "the best movie of the year" as of June 2019, and Deadline Hollywood's awards columnist Pete Hammond said that it was "the one movie I have seen that should have Oscar written all over it" as of July.

The New Yorker's Richard Brody said that the film was disappointing and lacked "the grit or texture of real experience".

=== Accolades ===
Award	Date of ceremony	Category	Recipients	Result	Ref.
African-American Film Critics Association	December 10, 2019	Best Independent Film	The Last Black Man in San Francisco	Won	
Austin Film Critics Association	January 7, 2020	Best First Film	Joe Talbot	Nominated	
Black Reel Awards	February 6, 2020	Outstanding Independent Film	Joe Talbot, Dede Gardner, Jeremy Kleiner, Christina Oh and Khaliah Neal	Won	
Black Reel Awards	February 6, 2020	Outstanding Actor	Jimmie Fails	Nominated	
Black Reel Awards	February 6, 2020	Outstanding Supporting Actor	Jonathan Majors	Nominated	
Black Reel Awards	February 6, 2020	Outstanding Breakthrough Performance, Male	Jimmie Fails	Nominated	
Black Reel Awards	February 6, 2020	Outstanding Breakthrough Performance, Male	Jonathan Majors	Nominated	
Black Reel Awards	February 6, 2020	Outstanding Ensemble	Julia Kim	Nominated	
Black Reel Awards	February 6, 2020	Outstanding Original Score	Emile Mosseri	Nominated	
Black Reel Awards	February 6, 2020	Outstanding Cinematography	Adam Newport-Berra	Nominated	
Boston Society of Film Critics Awards	December 15, 2019	Best Original Score	Emile Mosseri	runner-up	
Boston Society of Film Critics Awards	December 15, 2019	Best New Filmmaker	Joe Talbot	Won	
California on Location Awards	December 15, 2019	Location Team of the Year - Independent Feature Film	Daniel Lee, Jessica Lee Malloure, Carlisle Silvestri, Christian Baba	Nominated	
Camerimage	November 16, 2019	Main Competition	Adam Newport-Berra	Nominated	
Casting Society of America	January 30, 2020	Low Budget – Comedy or Drama	Julia Kim and Nina Henninger	Won	
Central Ohio Film Critics Association	January 2, 2020,	Breakthrough Film Artist	Joe Talbot	runner-up	
Central Ohio Film Critics Association	January 2, 2020,	Best Overlooked Film	The Last Black Man in San Francisco	Won	
Chicago Film Critics Association Awards	December 14, 2019	Breakthrough Filmmaker	Joe Talbot	Nominated	
Chlotrudis Awards	March 17, 2019	Best Movie	The Last Black Man in San Francisco	Nominated	
Chlotrudis Awards	March 17, 2019	Best Director	Joe Talbot	Nominated	
Chlotrudis Awards	March 17, 2019	Best Actor	Jimmie Fails	Nominated	
Chlotrudis Awards	March 17, 2019	Best Supporting Actor	Jonathan Majors	Won	
Chlotrudis Awards	March 17, 2019	Best Original Screenplay	Joe Talbot, Jimmie Fails, Rob Richert	Nominated	
Chlotrudis Awards	March 17, 2019	Best Performance by an Ensemble Cast	The Last Black Man in San Francisco	Nominated	
Chlotrudis Awards	March 17, 2019	Best Cinematography	Adam Newport-Berra	Won	
Chlotrudis Awards	March 17, 2019	Best Use of Music in a Film	Emile Mosseri	Nominated	
Chlotrudis Awards	March 17, 2019	Best Production Design	Jona Tochet	Nominated	
Directors Guild of America Awards	January 25, 2020	Outstanding Directing – First-Time Feature Film	Joe Talbot	Nominated	
Dublin Film Critics' Circle	December 17, 2019	Best Cinematography	Adam Newport-Berra	9th place	
Florida Film Critics Circle Awards	December 23, 2019	Best First Film	The Last Black Man in San Francisco	Nominated	
Gotham Awards	December 2, 2019	Best Screenplay	Joe Talbot, Jimmie Fails, Rob Richert	Nominated	
Gotham Awards	December 2, 2019	Breakthrough Actor	Jonathan Majors	Nominated	
Gotham Awards	December 2, 2019	Audience Award	Joe Talbot, Khaliah Neal, Dede Gardner, Jeremy Kleiner, Christina Oh	Nominated	
Gotham Awards	December 2, 2019	Bingham Ray Breakthrough Director Award	Joe Talbot	Nominated	
Greater Western New York Film Critics Association Awards	November 10, 2019	Best Debut Performance	Jimmie Fails	Nominated	
Greater Western New York Film Critics Association Awards	November 10, 2019	Best Debut Director	Joe Talbot	Nominated	
Houston Film Critics Society	January 2, 2020	Best Poster Design		Nominated	
Location Managers Guild Awards	24 October 2020	Outstanding Locations in a Contemporary Film	Daniel Lee	Won	
Locarno International Film Festival	August, 2019	Best Film	Joe Talbot	Nominated	
London Film Festival	October, 2019	First Feature Competition	Joe Talbot	Nominated	
Los Angeles Film Critics Association Awards	December 8, 2019	New Generation Award	Joe Talbot, Jimmie Fails, Rob Richert	Won	
Music City Film Critics' Association Awards	January 10, 2020	Best Supporting Actor	Jonathan Majors	Nominated	
National Board of Review	December 3, 2019	Top Ten Independent Films	The Last Black Man in San Francisco	Won	
North Carolina Film Critics Association	January 3, 2020	Tar Heel Award	Jonathan Majors	Nominated	
Oklahoma Film Critics Circle Awards	December 15, 2019	Best First Film	Joe Talbot	Won	
Online Association of Female Film Critics	December 23, 2019	Breakthrough Filmmaker	Joe Talbot	Nominated	
Online Film & Television Association	February 2, 2020	Best Music, Adapted Song	John Phillips	Nominated	
Online Film & Television Association	February 2, 2020	Best Breakthrough Performance: Male	Jonathan Majors	Nominated	
Online Film & Television Association	February 2, 2020	Best Feature Debut	Joe Talbot	2nd place (Note: Tied with Alma Har'el for Honey Boy)	
Online Film Critics Society Awards	January 6, 2020	Best Debut	Joe Talbot	Nominated	
Philadelphia Film Critics Circle Awards	December 9, 2019	Best Directorial Debut	Joe Talbot	Won (Note: Tied with Olivia Wilde for Booksmart)	
San Francisco Film Critics Circle	December 16, 2019	Best Director	Joe Talbot	Nominated	
San Francisco Film Critics Circle	December 16, 2019	Best Cinematography	Adam Newport-Berra	Nominated	
San Francisco Film Critics Circle	December 16, 2019	Best Original Score	Emile Mosseri	Won	
Seattle Film Critics Society	December 16, 2019	Best Original Score	Emile Mosseri	Nominated	
Sundance Film Festival	February 2, 2019	U.S. Dramatic Directing Award	Joe Talbot	Won	
Sundance Film Festival	February 2, 2019	Special Jury Award – Creator Collaboration	Joe Talbot	Won	
Sundance Film Festival	February 2, 2019	U.S. Dramatic Grand Jury Prize	Joe Talbot	Nominated	
Washington DC Area Film Critics Association Awards	December 8, 2019	Best Supporting Actor	Jonathan Majors	Nominated	

=== Year-end lists ===
The Last Black Man in San Francisco appeared on many critics' lists of the best films of 2019, including:

- (top 10, unranked) - Nell Minow, RogerEbert.com
- 1st - Odie Henderson, RogerEbert.com
- 2nd - Nick Allen, RogerEbert.com
- 4th - Carlos Aguilar, RogerEbert.com
- 7th - Tasha Robinson, Polygon
- 8th - Seongyong Cho, RogerEbert.com
- 9th - Michael Phillips, Chicago Tribune
- 10th - Robert Daniels, RogerEbert.com
- 10th - Manohla Dargis, New York Times
- 10th - Christy Lemire, RogerEbert.com
- 13th - Karen Han, Polygon
- 13th - Adam Kempenaar, Filmspotting
- 16th - Josh Larsen, Filmspotting
- 22nd - IndieWire critics' poll
- Honorable mention - Justin Chang, Los Angeles Times

== See also ==
- List of black films of the 2010s
- The Last Block in Harlem
