= The Last Block in Harlem =

2009 novel by Christopher Herz

- Author: Christopher Herz
- Language: English
- Publisher: Canal Publishing
- Publication date: 2009

The Last Block in Harlem is a novel by Christopher Herz published in 2009 by Canal Publishing.

The novel is about an unemployed former advertising copywriter who tries to save his Harlem neighborhood from being bought up by rich developers. He uses his marketing knowledge to empower local leaders, forming a coalition that does a deal with a corrupt local politician to prevent changes. The book chronicles the personalities, factions, and power struggles at play in one city block, showcasing the immense complexities with respect to gentrification and other urban issues.

The book became notable as a result of Herz's unique marketing strategy: to walk the streets of NYC and sell his book by hand, not returning home each night until he sold at least ten copies.

== See also ==
- The Last Black Man in San Francisco

== Reviews ==
- "The Last Block in Harlem" at Shades of Gray.
- Christina Zawadiwsky, "The Last Block In Harlem book review", Book Room Reviews, August 17, 2011.
