= Henry Durand =

Henry Durand may refer to:

- Henry Marion Durand (1812–1871), British soldier and colonial administrator
- Henry Mortimer Durand (1850–1924), British diplomat and civil servant of colonial British India
- Henry R. Durand (1855–1932), restaurateur, president and general manager of the H. R. Durand Restaurant Company
- Henry Strong Durand (1861–1929), Yale alumnus and writer

== See also ==
- Henry Durant (disambiguation)
