= June Williamson =

American architect and professor

June Williamson is an architect and professor of architecture. She is the chair of the Spitzer School of Architecture at CCNY. She is best known for her ideas regarding the retrofitting of American suburbia into a denser, more efficient system. She teaches site tech at CCNY.

== Books ==
- Case Studies in Retrofitting Suburbia: Urban Design Strategies for Urgent Challenges. With Ellen Dunham-Jones (Hoboken: John Wiley & Sons, 2021).
- Designing Suburban Futures: New Models from Build a Better Burb (Island Press, 2013).
- Retrofitting Suburbia: Urban Design Solutions for Redesigning Suburbs. With Ellen Dunham-Jones (Hoboken: John Wiley & Sons, 2008, updated edition 2011).
