= Henry William Durant =

British mathematician

- Born: 1902
- Died: 1982 (aged 79–80)
- Occupations: Opinion pollster and market researcher

Henry William Durant (1902–1982) was a noted opinion pollster and market researcher. Durant was responsible for establishing several leading opinion poll and market research institutions including the British Institute of Public Opinion (BIPO), the Market Research Society and the European Society for Marketing and Opinion Research (he served as president between 1952 and 1954). Throughout his work he took a more serious and statistical approach to his work than some of his "rivals" and was critical of some of those using more qualitative methods such as those employed by "journalistic" Mass-Observation studies of the 1940s.

== Personal life ==
He married Ruth Lazarus in 1935 but they divorced in 1941. In 1945 he married his second wife, Margaret Collens, and together they had three daughters.
