= Ellen Dunham-Jones =

Architectural educator and urbanist

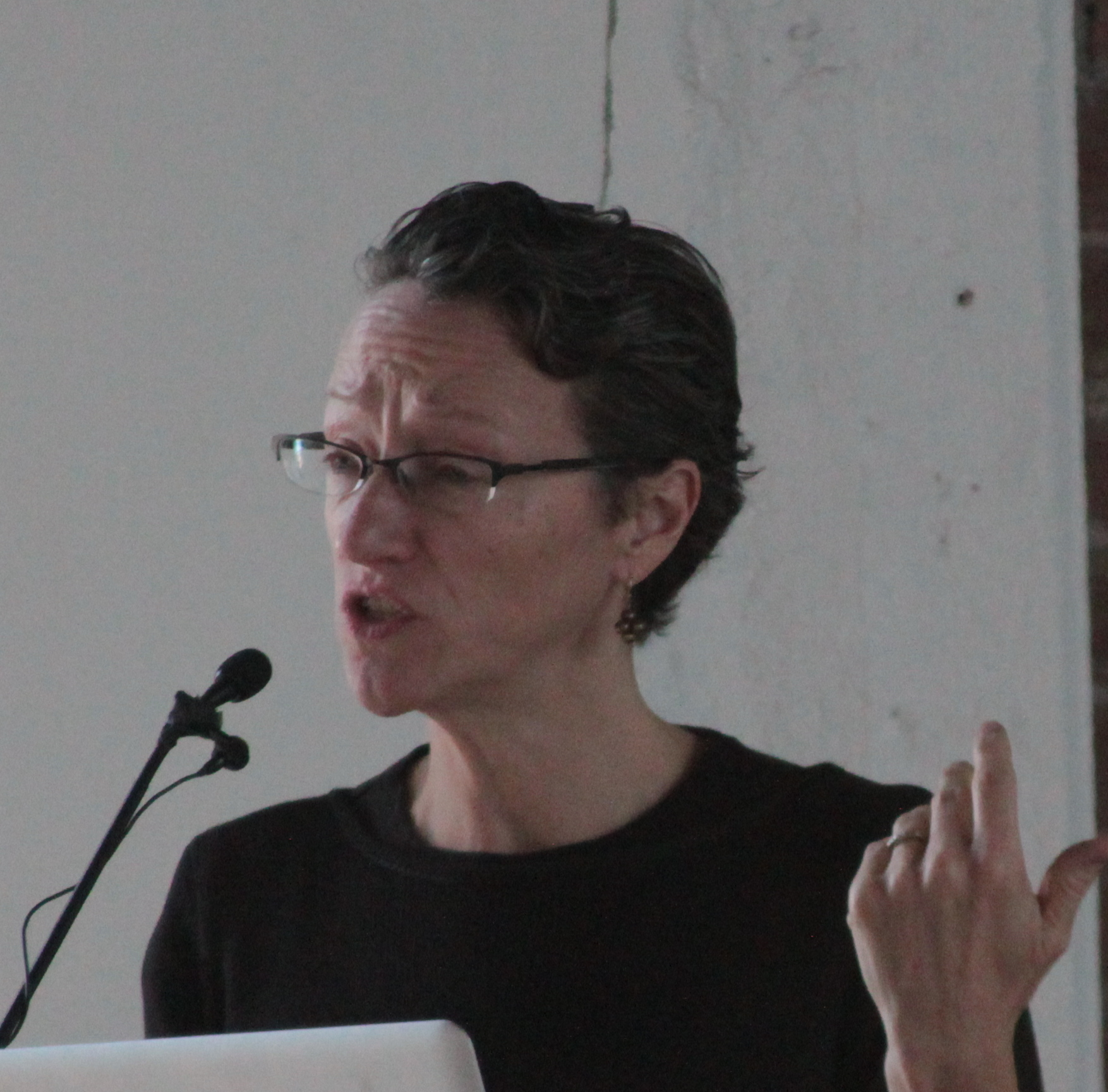
- Born: January 17, 1959 (age 67)
- Occupation: Architect

Academic background
- Education: Princeton University School of Architecture

Academic work
- Discipline: Architecture
- Institutions: Georgia Tech

Ellen Dunham-Jones (born January 27, 1959) is an architectural educator and urbanist best known for her work on re-educating the public how to interact with their environment. She is also an authority on suburban redevelopment.

== Education ==
Ellen Dunham-Jones studied at Princeton University, graduating with an AB in architecture and planning in 1980 and a Master of Architecture in 1983. She is a registered architect in New York State.

== Career ==
She is a professor in the School of Architecture at Georgia Tech, where she also serves as director of its MS in Urban Design Program in the College of Design.

== Work ==
Dunham-Jones and June Williamson co-authored Retrofitting Suburbia: Urban Design Solutions for Redesigning Suburbs which was awarded the Architecture & Urban Planning category of the 2009 PROSE Award.

== Awards and professional leadership ==
- PROSE Award, 2009 for Professional and Scholarly Excellence from the Association of American Publishers as the 2009 best book of the year in architecture and urban planning.
- Retrofitting Suburbia featured in Time's March 23, 2009, cover story
- Fellow of the Congress for the New Urbanism
- #71 on Planetizen's list of the Top 100 Most Influential Urbanists of All Time

== In popular culture ==
Dunham-Jones appeared as herself on the show Adam Ruins Everything.
