= 20th Annual Black Reel Awards =

Film-industry awards in 2020

Black Reel Awards of 2020
- Date: February 6, 2020 (Films); August 6, 2020 (Television)
- Location: Washington, D.C.

Highlights
- Most wins: Dolemite Is My Name (8)
- Most nominations: Queen & Slim (14)
- Outstanding film: Dolemite Is My Name

4th Annual Black Reel Awards for Television
- Date: August 6, 2020
- Location: Washington, D.C.
- Most wins: Watchmen (5)
- Most nominations: Watchmen (10)

The 20th Annual Black Reel Awards ceremony, presented by the Foundation for the Augmentation of African-Americans in Film (FAAAF) and honoring the best films of 2019, took place on February 6, 2020. During the ceremony, FAAAF presented the Black Reel Awards in 23 categories. The nominations were announced on December 11, 2019.

Queen & Slim earned a leading fourteen nominations, followed by Us and Dolemite Is My Name with eleven and ten nominations, respectively.

The 4th Annual Black Reel Awards for Television was presented on August 6, 2020. The nominations were announced on June 18, 2020. HBO's Watchmen & Insecure lead the nominees with 10 each. Watchmen became the biggest winner, earning 5 BRATs including Outstanding TV Movie or Limited Series and Outstanding Actress, TV Movie/Limited Series for Regina King. Insecure took home the top Comedy prize for Outstanding Comedy Series for a second consecutive year while Pose won the award for Outstanding Drama Series for its second season.

== Film winners and nominees ==
Outstanding Film	Outstanding Director
Dolemite Is My Name – Eddie Murphy, John Fox, and John Davis; Just Mercy – Asher Goldstein and Gil Netter; Queen & Slim – Pamela Addy, Andrew Coles, James Frey, Michelle Knudsen, Melina Matsoukas, Lena Waithe and Brad Weston; Us – Jordan Peele, Jason Blum, Ian Cooper, and Sean McKittrick; Waves – Trey Edward Shults, Kevin Turen, and James Wilson	Jordan Peele – Us; Mati Diop – Atlantics; Kasi Lemmons – Harriet; Melina Matsoukas – Queen & Slim; Julius Onah – Luce
Outstanding Actor	Outstanding Actress
Eddie Murphy – Dolemite Is My Name as Rudy Ray Moore; Jimmie Fails – The Last Black Man in San Francisco as Jimmie Fails; Kelvin Harrison Jr. – Luce as Luce Edgar; Kelvin Harrison Jr. – Waves as Tyler Williams; Daniel Kaluuya – Queen & Slim as Earnest "Slim" Hines	Lupita Nyong'o – Us as Adelaide Wilson/Red; Cynthia Erivo – Harriet as Harriet Tubman; Gugu Mbatha-Raw – Fast Color as Ruth; Jodie Turner-Smith – Queen & Slim as Angela "Queen" Johnson; Alfre Woodard – Clemency as Warden Bernadine Williams
Outstanding Supporting Actor	Outstanding Supporting Actress
Wesley Snipes – Dolemite Is My Name as D'Urville Martin; Sterling K. Brown – Waves as Ronald Williams; Jamie Foxx – Just Mercy as Walter McMillian; Aldis Hodge – Clemency as Anthony Woods; Jonathan Majors – The Last Black Man in San Francisco as Montgomery "Mont" Allen	Da'Vine Joy Randolph – Dolemite Is My Name as Lady Reed; Shahadi Wright Joseph – Us as Zora Wilson/Umbrae; Janelle Monáe – Harriet as Marie Buchanon; Taylor Russell – Waves as Emily Williams; Octavia Spencer – Luce as Harriet Wilson
Outstanding Breakthrough Performance, Male	Outstanding Breakthrough Performance, Female
Kelvin Harrison Jr. – Waves as Tyler Williams; Tituss Burgess – Dolemite Is My Name as Theodore Toney; Jimmie Fails – The Last Black Man in San Francisco as Jimmie Fails; Aldis Hodge – Clemency as Anthony Woods; Jonathan Majors – The Last Black Man in San Francisco as Montgomery "Mont" Allen	Da'Vine Joy Randolph – Dolemite Is My Name as Lady Reed; Mame Bineta Sane – Atlantics as Cheikh; Shahadi Wright Joseph – Us as Zora Wilson/Umbrae; Taylor Russell – Waves as Emily Williams; Jodie Turner-Smith – Queen & Slim as Angela "Queen" Johnson
Outstanding Ensemble	Outstanding Screenplay, Adapted or Original
Dolemite Is My Name – Lindsey Graham and Mary Vernieu; The Last Black Man in San Francisco – Julia Kim; Just Mercy – Carmen Cuba; Us – Terri Taylor; Waves – Avy Kaufman	Us – Jordan Peele; Clemency – Chinonye Chukwu; Les Misérables – Ladj Ly, Giordano Gederlini, and Alexis Manenti; Luce – J.C. Lee and Julius Onah; Queen & Slim – Lena Waithe
Outstanding Documentary	Outstanding Independent Film
The Black Godfather – Reginald Hudlin; The Apollo – Roger Ross Williams; Knock Down the House – Rachel Lears; Miles Davis: Birth of the Cool – Stanley Nelson Jr.; Toni Morrison: The Pieces I Am – Timothy Greenfield-Sanders	The Last Black Man in San Francisco – Joe Talbot, Dede Gardner, Jeremy Kleiner, Christina Oh, and Khaliah Neal; Burning Cane – Phillip Youmans, Ojo Akinlana, Wendell Pierce, Mose Mayer, Isaac Webb, Cassandra Youmans, Jakob Johnson, and Karen Kaia Livers; Clemency – Chinonye Chukwu, Timur Bekbosunov, Julian Cautherley, Bronwyn Cornelius, and Peter Wong; Guava Island – Hiro Murai, Donald Glover, Carmen Cuba, Jennifer Roth, and Fam Udeorji; Luce – Julius Onah, John Baker, and Andrew Yang
Outstanding Independent Short Film	Outstanding Independent Documentary
Hair Love – Matthew A. Cherry; America – Garrett Bradley; It's Not About Jimmy Keene – Caleb Jaffe; Suicide by Sunlight – Nikyatu Jusu; Zahra and the Oil Man – Yucef Mayes	No Lye: An American Beauty Story – Bayer Mack; 16 Bars – Sam Bathrick; The Remix: Hip Hop x Fashion – Lisa Cortes and Farah X
Outstanding Foreign Film	Outstanding Voice Performance
Atlantics (Senegal); The Boy Who Harnessed the Wind (United Kingdom); Farming (United Kingdom); In Fabric (United Kingdom); Les Misérables (France)	Chiwetel Ejiofor – The Lion King as Scar; Donald Glover – The Lion King as Simba; James Earl Jones – The Lion King as Mufasa; Keegan-Michael Key – Toy Story 4 as Ducky; Jordan Peele – Toy Story 4 as Bunny
Outstanding Emerging Director	Outstanding First Screenplay
Melina Matsoukas – Queen & Slim; Chinonye Chukwu – Clemency; Nia DaCosta – Little Woods; Mati Diop – Atlantics; Julius Onah – Luce	Queen & Slim – Lena Waithe; Atlantics – Mati Diop and Olivier Demangel; The Boy Who Harnessed the Wind – Chiwetel Ejiofor; Burning Cane – Phillip Youmans; Clemency – Chinonye Chukwu
Outstanding Original Song	Outstanding Original Score
"Collide" from Queen & Slim – Tiana Major9 and EarthGang; "Don't Turn Back" from The Apollo – Robert Glasper and Ledisi; "Guarding the Gates" from Queen & Slim – Lauryn Hill; "It's Not Over" from Brian Banks – Gizzle and Sam Fisher; "Spirit" from The Lion King – Beyoncé	Us – Michael Abels; Dolemite Is My Name – Scott Bomar; The Last Black Man in San Francisco – Emile Mosseri; Queen & Slim – Devonté Hynes; Waves – Trent Reznor and Atticus Ross
Outstanding Cinematography	Outstanding Costume Design
Queen & Slim – Tad Racliffe; Harriet – John Toll; The Last Black Man in San Francisco – Adam Newport-Berra; Us – Mike Gioulakis; Waves – Drew Daniels	Dolemite Is My Name – Ruth E. Carter; Harriet – Paul Tazewell; Hustlers – Mitchell Travers; Queen & Slim – Shiona Turini; Us – Kym Barrett
Outstanding Production Design
Dolemite Is My Name – Clay A. Griffith; Harriet – Warren Alan Young; The Lion King – James Chinlund; Queen & Slim – Karen Murphy; Us – Ruth de Jong

=== Films with multiple nominations and wins ===
Film	Wins	Nominations	Outstanding Film Nominee/Winner
Queen & Slim	4	14	Nominee
Us	4	11	Nominee
Dolemite Is My Name	8	10	Winner
Waves	1	9	Nominee
The Last Black Man in San Francisco	1	8	
Clemency	0	7	
Harriet	0	6	
Luce	0	6	
Atlantics	1	5	
The Lion King	1	5	
Just Mercy	0	3	Nominee
The Boy Who Harnessed the Wind	0	2	
Burning Cane	0	2	
Les Misérables	0	2	
Toy Story 4	0	2	
The Apollo	0	2	

== Television winners and nominees ==
=== Comedy ===
Outstanding Comedy Series
Insecure (HBO); Ballers (HBO); Black-ish (ABC); Dear White People (Netflix); High Fidelity (Hulu)
Outstanding Actor, Comedy Series	Outstanding Actress, Comedy Series
Don Cheadle as Maurice Monroe on Black Monday (Showtime); Anthony Anderson as Andre "Dre" Johnson Sr. on Black-ish (ABC); DeRon Horton as Lionel Higgins on Dear White People (Netflix); Dwayne Johnson as Spencer Strasmore on Ballers (HBO); Tracy Morgan as Tray Leviticus Barker on The Last O.G. (TBS)	Issa Rae as Issa Dee on Insecure (HBO); Logan Browning as Samantha White on Dear White People (Netflix); Rashida Jones as Joya Barris on #blackAF (Netflix); Zoë Kravitz as Robyn "Rob" Brooks on High Fidelity (Hulu); Tracee Ellis Ross as Dr. Rainbow "Bow" Johnson on Black-ish (ABC)
Outstanding Supporting Actor, Comedy Series	Outstanding Supporting Actress, Comedy Series
Kenan Thompson as Various Characters on Saturday Night Live (NBC); Mahershala Ali as Sheikh Ali Malik on Ramy (Hulu); Jay Ellis as Lawrence Walker on Insecure (HBO); J.B. Smoove as Leon Black on Curb Your Enthusiasm (HBO); John David Washington as Ricky Jerret on Ballers (HBO)	Yvonne Orji as Molly Carter on Insecure (HBO); Regina Hall as Dawn Darcy on Black Monday (Showtime); Jenifer Lewis as Ruby Johnson on Black-ish (ABC); Marsai Martin as Diane Johnson on Black-ish (ABC); Natasha Rothwell as Kelli Prenny on Insecure (HBO)
Outstanding Guest Actor, Comedy Series	Outstanding Guest Actress, Comedy Series
Eddie Murphy as Various Characters on Saturday Night Live (NBC); Neil Brown Jr. as Chad Kerr on Insecure (HBO); Sterling K. Brown as Reggie on The Marvelous Mrs. Maisel (Amazon Prime Video); J.B. Smoove as Carl on The Last O.G. (TBS); Blair Underwood as Prof. Moses Brown on Dear White People (Netflix)	Maya Rudolph as Judge Gen on The Good Place (NBC); Angela Bassett as Mo on A Black Lady Sketch Show (HBO); Yvette Nicole Brown as Evelyn Conners on Dear White People (Netflix); Issa Rae on A Black Lady Sketch Show (HBO); Wanda Sykes as Moms Mabley on The Marvelous Mrs. Maisel (Prime Video)
Outstanding Directing, Comedy Series	Outstanding Writing, Comedy Series
Dear White People (Episode: "Chapter V"), Directed by Cheryl Dunye (Netflix); #blackAF (Episode: "still....because of slavery"), Directed by Rashida Jones (Netflix); #blackAF (Episode: "Yo, between you and me....this is because of slavery"), Directed by Kenya Barris (Netflix); Black-ish (Episode: "Hair Day"), Directed by Anya Adams (ABC); Insecure (Episode: "Lowkey Movin' On"), Directed by Stella Meghie (HBO)	High Fidelity (Episode: "Uptown"), Written by E.T. Feigenbaum and Zoë Kravitz (Hulu); #blackAF (Episode: "hard to believe, but still because of slavery"), Written by Allison McDonald (Netflix); Black-ish (Episode: "Hair Day"), Written by Marquita J. Robinson (ABC); Insecure (Episode: "Lowkey Happy"), Written by Natasha Rothwell (HBO); Insecure (Episode: "Lowkey Movin' On"), Written by Syreeta Singleton (HBO)

=== Drama ===
Outstanding Drama Series
Pose (FX); All Rise (CBS); For Life (ABC); Godfather of Harlem (Epix); Wu-Tang: An American Saga (Hulu)
Outstanding Actor, Drama Series	Outstanding Actress, Drama Series
Sterling K. Brown as Randall Pearson on This Is Us (NBC); Nicholas Pinnock as Aaron Wallace on For Life (ABC); Billy Porter as Pray Tell on Pose (FX); Kofi Siriboe as Ralph Angel Bordelon on Queen Sugar (OWN); Forest Whitaker as Bumpy Johnson on Godfather of Harlem (Epix)	Zendaya as Rue Bennett on Euphoria (HBO); Viola Davis as Annalise Keating on How to Get Away with Murder (ABC); Simone Missick as Judge Lola Carmichael on All Rise (CBS); Janelle Monáe as Jacqueline Calico / Alex Eastern on Homecoming (Prime Video); Rutina Wesley as Nova Bordelon on Queen Sugar (OWN)
Outstanding Supporting Actor, Drama Series	Outstanding Supporting Actress, Drama Series
Giancarlo Esposito as Adam Clayton Powell Jr. on Godfather of Harlem (Epix); Delroy Lindo as Adrian Boseman on The Good Fight (CBS All Access); Ashton Sanders as Bobby Diggs/RZA on Wu-Tang: An American Saga (Hulu); Larenz Tate as Rashad Tate on Power (Starz); Jeffrey Wright as Bernard Lowe on Westworld (HBO)	Thandie Newton as Maeve Millay on Westworld (HBO); Zoë Kravitz as Bonnie Carlson on Big Little Lies (HBO); Gugu Mbatha-Raw as Hannah Shoenfeld on The Morning Show (Apple TV+); Simone Missick as Trepp on Altered Carbon (Netflix); Susan Kelechi Watson as Beth (Clarke) Pearson on This Is Us (NBC)
Outstanding Guest Actor, Drama Series	Outstanding Guest Actress, Drama Series
Chad L. Coleman as Corey James on All American (The CW); Asante Blackk as Malik Hodges on This Is Us (NBC); David Alan Grier as Jimmy Dale on Queen Sugar (OWN); Ron Cephas Jones as William "Shakespeare" Hill on This Is Us (NBC); Michael B. Jordan as Mark Warren on Raising Dion (Netflix)	Cicely Tyson as Ophelia Harkness on How to Get Away with Murder (ABC); L. Scott Caldwell as Roxy Robinson on All Rise (CBS); Phylicia Rashad as Carol Clarke on This Is Us (NBC); Jill Scott as Lady Eve on Black Lightning (The CW); Cree Summer as Dr. Octavia Laurent on Queen Sugar (OWN)
Outstanding Directing, Drama Series	Outstanding Writing, Drama Series
Pose (Episode: "In My Heels"), Directed by Janet Mock (FX); Godfather of Harlem (Episode: "By Whatever Means Necessary"), Directed by John Ridley (Epix); Hunters (Episode: "(Ruth 1:16)"), Directed by Millicent Shelton (Prime Video); Queen Sugar (Episode: "I Am"), Directed by Ayoka Chenzira (OWN); This Is Us (Episode: "A Hell of a Week: Part One"), Directed by Kevin Hooks (NBC)	This Is Us (Episode: "A Hell of a Week: Part One"), Written by Jon Dorsey (NBC); Black Lightning (Episode: "The Book of Markovia: Chapter Four: Grab the Strap"), Written by Charles D. Holland and Asheleigh O. Conley (The CW); Hunters (Episode: "(Ruth 1:16)"), Written by Zakiyyah Alexander (Prime Video); Pose (Episode: "Love Like This Before"), Written by Janet Mock and Ryan Murphy (FX); Queen Sugar (Episode: "Where My Body Stops or Begins"), Written by Mike Flynn (OWN)

=== Television Movies/Limited Series ===
Outstanding Television Movie or Limited Series
Watchmen (HBO); The Clark Sisters: First Ladies of Gospel (Lifetime); Hollywood (Netflix); Little Fires Everywhere (Hulu); Self Made (Netflix)
Outstanding Actor, TV Movie/Limited Series	Outstanding Actress, TV Movie/Limited Series
Blair Underwood as Charles Joseph Walker on Self Made: Inspired by the Life of Madam CJ Walker (Netflix); Andre Braugher as James Evans Sr. on Live in Front of a Studio Audience (ABC); André Holland as Elliot Udo on The Eddy (Netflix); Alano Miller as Evan Fisher on Cherish the Day (OWN); Jeremy Pope as Archie Coleman on Hollywood (Netflix)	Regina King as Angela Abar / Sister Night on Watchmen (HBO); Viola Davis as Florida Evans on Live in Front of a Studio Audience (ABC); Aunjanue Ellis as Mattie Moss Clark on The Clark Sisters: First Ladies of Gospel (Lifetime); Octavia Spencer as Madam C. J. Walker on Self Made (Netflix); Kerry Washington as Mia Warren on Little Fires Everywhere (Hulu)
Outstanding Supporting Actor, TV Movie/Limited Series	Outstanding Supporting Actress, TV Movie/Limited Series
Yahya Abdul-Mateen II as Calvin "Cal" Abar on Watchmen (HBO); Jovan Adepo as young Will Reeves on Watchmen (HBO); Bill Bellamy as Sweetness on Self Made (Netflix); Tituss Burgess as Titus Andromedon on Unbreakable Kimmy Schmidt: Kimmy vs the Reverend (Netflix); Louis Gossett Jr. as Will Reeves on Watchmen (HBO)	Lexi Underwood as Pearl Warren on Little Fires Everywhere (Hulu); Uzo Aduba as Shirley Chisholm on Mrs. America (FX); Viola Davis as Miss Rayleen on Troop Zero (Prime Video); Carmen Ejogo as Addie on Self Made (Netflix); Raven Goodwin as Denise Clark-Bradford on The Clark Sisters: First Ladies of Gospel (Lifetime)
Outstanding Directing, TV Movie/Limited Series	Outstanding Writing, TV Movie/Limited Series
Watchmen (Episode: "This Extraordinary Being"), Directed by Stephen Williams (HBO); The Clark Sisters: First Ladies of Gospel, Directed by Christine Swanson (Lifetime); Hollywood (Episode: "(Screen) Test"), Directed by Janet Mock (Netflix); Little Fires Everywhere (Episode: "Picture Perfect"), Directed by Nzingha Stewart (Hulu); Watchmen (Episode: "She Was Killed by Space Junk"), Directed by Stephen Williams (HBO)	Watchmen (Episode: "If You Don't Like My Story, Write Your Own"), Written by Damon Lindelof and Christal Henry (HBO); The Clark Sisters: First Ladies of Gospel, Written by Sylvia L. Jones and Camille Tucker (Lifetime); Little Fires Everywhere (Episode: "Seventy Cents"), Written by Raamla Mohamed (Hulu); Mrs. America (Episode: "Shirley"), Written by Tanya Barfield (FX); Watchmen (Episode: "This Extraordinary Being"), Written by Damon Lindelof and Cord Jefferson (HBO)

=== Programs with multiple nominations and wins ===
Program	Wins	Nominations
Watchmen	5	10
Insecure	3	10
This Is Us	2	7
Pose	2	4
Saturday Night Live	2	2
Dear White People	1	6
Little Fires Everywhere	1	5
Self Made: Inspired by the Life of Madam CJ Walker	1	5
Godfather of Harlem	1	4
High Fidelity	1	3
Black Monday	1	2
How to Get Away with Murder	1	2
Westworld	1	2
Black-ish	0	7
Queen Sugar	0	6
The Clark Sisters: First Ladies of Gospel	1	5
#blackAF	0	4
All Rise	0	3
Ballers	0	3
A Black Lady Sketch Show	0	2
Black Lightning	0	2
For Life	0	2
Hollywood	0	3
Hunters	0	2
The Last O.G.	0	2
Live in Front of a Studio Audience: "All in the Family"/"Good Times"	0	2
The Marvelous Mrs. Maisel	0	2
Mrs. America	0	2
Wu-Tang: An American Saga	0	2
