= Samo Lives =

- Directed by: Julius Onah
- Written by: Julius Onah; Peter Glanz
- Produced by: John Baker; Eric Ro; Rob Feng; Charles D. King; James Lopez; Julius Onah
- Starring: Kelvin Harrison Jr.; Danny Ramirez; Dane DeHaan; Kathryn Newton; Thomas Kretschmann; Lukas Gage; Chase Sui Wonders; Antony Starr; Jeffrey Wright
- Cinematography: Todd Martin
- Production companies: Fifth Season; Macro Film Studios; Ossetra Films
- Distributed by: Neon
- Country: United States
- Language: English

Samo Lives is an upcoming American biographical film written and directed by Julius Onah. The film stars Kelvin Harrison Jr., Danny Ramirez, Dane DeHaan, Kathryn Newton, Thomas Kretschmann, Lukas Gage, Chase Sui Wonders, Antony Starr and Jeffrey Wright.

== Premise ==
The movie is about the artist Jean-Michel Basquiat, a notable figure in New York City street art.

== Cast ==
- Kelvin Harrison Jr. as Jean-Michel Basquiat
- Danny Ramirez
- Dane DeHaan
- Kathryn Newton
- Thomas Kretschmann
- Lukas Gage
- Chase Sui Wonders
- Lucy Fry
- Yolonda Ross
- Priah Ferguson
- Philip Johnson Richardson
- Michael Angelo Covino
- Samiya Allen-Graham
- Charlene Amoia
- Antony Starr as Andy Warhol
- Jeffrey Wright as Gérard Basquiat

== Production ==
In January 2022, it was announced that Endeavor Content had developed and financed the biopic film Samo Lives, with Kelvin Harrison Jr. portraying Jean-Michel Basquiat while Julius Onah was writing and directing the project after Harrison Jr. and Onah worked together on the critically acclaimed drama Luce (2019).

Filming began on September 15, 2025 in Jersey City, New Jersey. In October 2025, filming had completed with 14 more actors having been added to the cast, including Jeffrey Wright, who had previously portrayed Basquiat in the 1996 film Basquiat.
