= Tracee Ellis Ross =

American actress (born 1972)

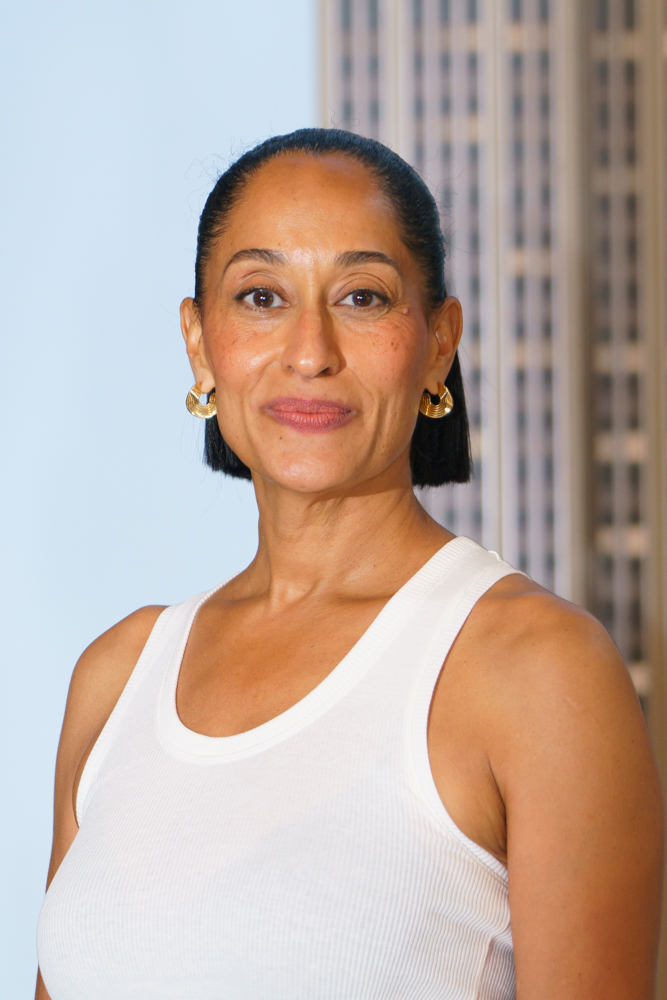
- Ross in 2026
- Born: Tracee Joy Silberstein; October 29, 1972 (age 54); Los Angeles, California, U.S.
- Education: Brown University (BA)
- Occupations: Actress; singer; producer; television host
- Years active: 1996–present
- Political party: Democrat
- Parents: Robert Ellis Silberstein (father); Diana Ross (mother)
- Relatives: Rhonda Ross Kendrick (sister); Evan Ross (brother); Barbara Ross-Lee (aunt)
- Website: traceeellisross.com

Tracee Joy Silberstein (born October 29, 1972), known professionally as Tracee Ellis Ross, is an American actress. The daughter of Motown singer Diana Ross, she is known for her lead roles in the television series Girlfriends (2000–2008) and Black-ish (2014–2022), receiving nominations for five Primetime Emmy Awards for Outstanding Lead Actress in a Comedy Series for the latter.

Ross began acting in independent films and variety series. She hosted the pop-culture magazine The Dish on Lifetime. From 2000 to 2008, Ross played the starring role of Joan Clayton in the UPN/CW comedy series Girlfriends, and received two NAACP Image Awards for Outstanding Actress in a Comedy Series for the role. She also has appeared in the films Hanging Up (2000), I-See-You.Com (2006), and Daddy's Little Girls (2007), before returning to television playing Dr. Carla Reed on the BET sitcom Reed Between the Lines (2011).

From 2014 to 2022, Ross starred as Dr. Rainbow Johnson in the ABC comedy series, Black-ish. Her work on it has earned her six NAACP Image Awards and a Golden Globe Award for Best Actress in a Television Series – Musical or Comedy. She also received nominations for six Primetime Emmy Awards, for both acting and producing. In 2019, she co-created a prequel spin-off of Black-ish titled Mixed-ish (2019–2021). In 2020, she starred in and recorded the soundtrack album for the musical film The High Note. Ross won a Daytime Emmy Award for producing the original series Solo Traveling with Tracee Ellis Ross (2025–2026) for The Roku Channel.

== Early life and education ==
Ross was born October 29, 1972, in Los Angeles, California, to Motown singer/actress Diana Ross and music business manager Robert Ellis Silberstein. Her father is Jewish while her mother is African-American and a Baptist. She adopted the name Tracee Ellis Ross, wishing to retain both of her parents' names after her father dropped the name Silberstein. She has a younger sister, Chudney Lane Silberstein, and an older half-sister, Rhonda Ross Kendrick.

In the 80s, Tracee was photographed along with her mother, Rhonda and Chudney by Andy Warhol. Her mother used her own photo for the cover of her 1982 album, Silk Electric, for which Warhol was given credit.

When her mother married Arne Næss Jr. in 1985, Tracee gained three step-siblings: Katinka, Christoffer, and folk singer Leona Naess. She remains on close terms with all of them. Before her mother and Naess divorced in 2000, they welcomed her two half-brothers, Ross Arne in 1987, and actor and musician Evan Ross in 1988.

Ross attended The Dalton School in Manhattan, Riverdale Country School in the Bronx and the Institut Le Rosey in Switzerland. She was a model in her teens. She attended Brown University, where she appeared in plays, and graduated in 1994 with a theatre degree. She later worked in the fashion industry as a model and contributing fashion editor to Mirabella and New York magazines. Ross is the recipient of an honorary degree from Spelman College

Ross has ptosis, slightly affecting her left eyelid. Following a speech at the American Music Awards, Internet trolls commented on her condition, leading her to post an Instagram video saying, "I know y'all make fun of my eyes, you know what I mean? Well, f**ck off, 'cause it's not my fault, alright? My body does what it does, I don't know why. But sometimes when I'm tired, this one just gives up, and it's like, 'Goodnight!'..."Go ahead, make fun of my eyes, OK? But I think they're nice, I think they're so nice, I do."

== Career ==
=== Early works ===
Ross made her big-screen debut in 1996, playing a Jewish/African-American woman in the independent feature film Far Harbor. The following year, she debuted as host of The Dish, a Lifetime TV magazine series keeping tabs on popular culture. In 1998, she starred as a former high school track star who remained silent about having been abused at the hands of a coach, in the NBC made-for-TV movie Race Against Fear: A Moment of Truth. Her next role was an independent feature film titled Sue. In 2000, she landed her first major studio role in Diane Keaton's Hanging Up. That same year, she broke into comedy as a regular performer in the MTV series The Lyricist Lounge Show, a hip-hop variety series mixing music, dramatic sketches, and comedic skits. In February 2006, she starred in Kanye West's "Touch The Sky" MTV music video, playing the role of the best friend of Kanye's ex.

=== 2000–2013: Breakthrough with Girlfriends ===
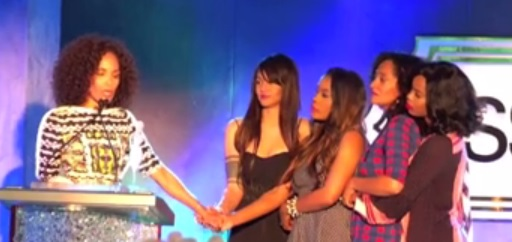
Left to right: Girlfriends creator Mara Brock Akil with co-stars Persia White, Golden Brooks, Ross and Jill Marie Jones in 2013.

Ross's biggest career achievement came when she landed the lead role in the hit UPN/The CW series Girlfriends, starring as the show's protagonist Joan Carol Clayton — a successful (and often neurotic) lawyer looking for love, challenges, and adventure. The series centered on four (later three) young African-American women, and their male best friend. In 2007, Ross won an NAACP Image Award in the category, Outstanding Actress in a Comedy Series for her role on the series. She won a second Image Award for the role in 2009.

In 2007, Ross starred with her brother Evan Ross and Queen Latifah in the HBO movie Life Support. That same year, she appeared in the Tyler Perry theatrical movie Daddy's Little Girls. She appeared in the 2009 film Labor Pains.

In 2010, she appeared in an episode of Private Practice as a pregnant doctor. In 2011, Ross appeared in four episodes of CSI as the estranged wife of Laurence Fishburne's character.

Ross starred in the sitcom Reed Between the Lines with Malcolm-Jamal Warner airing on BET starting in October 2011. She won a third NAACP Image Award for Outstanding Actress in a Comedy Series in 2012 for her performance in the series. In August 2012, it was announced that Ross would not return for Season Two. In 2011, she appeared in the Lifetime film Five directed by Alicia Keys. The performance in the film earned her nominations for an NAACP Image Award and Black Reel Awards for Outstanding Actress in a Television Movie or Mini-Series. In 2012, Ross starred in the NBC drama pilot Bad Girls.

=== 2014–present: Black-ish and mainstream success ===
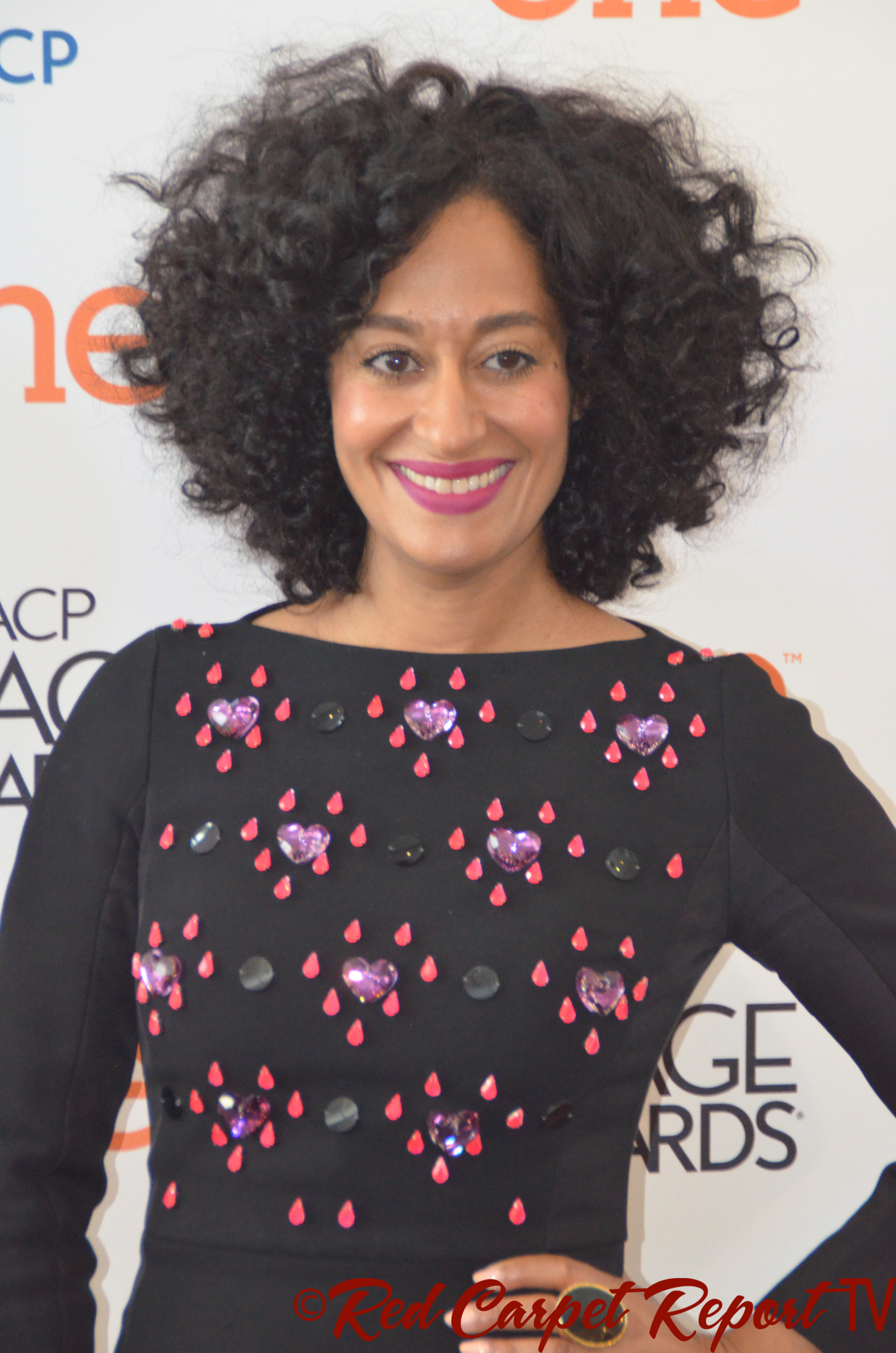
Ross at the 2014 NAACP Image Awards

In 2014, Ross was cast in the ABC comedy series Black-ish, opposite Anthony Anderson. She plays the female lead role of Dr. Rainbow Johnson. The series debuted with generally positive reviews from critics. Ross received three NAACP Image Awards and received nominations for two Critics' Choice Television Awards, four Primetime Emmy Awards, and two Screen Actors Guild Awards for her performance in the series. Ross's 2016 nomination for Outstanding Lead Actress in a Comedy Series was the first for an African-American woman in that category in 30 years. The same year, Ross and Anderson faced off on Spike's Lip Sync Battle. She emerged victorious with performances of Nicki Minaj's "Super Bass" and Pat Benatar's "Love Is a Battlefield".

In 2015, Ross was awarded an honorary Doctorate of Fine Arts (honoris causa) by Brown University. Ross hosted the BET Awards in 2015 and 2016, and the American Music Awards in 2017 and 2018. She also hosted The Fashion Awards in 2019.

As of 2018, as CEO of Pattern Beauty LLC of El Segundo, California, Ross produces a line of "Juicy and Joyful" beauty hair care products made with safe ingredients for curls and promotes support organizations to empower women and people of color. Ross appeared in the fourth episode of A Little Late with Lilly Singh.

In 2019, Ross created, alongside Kenya Barris, a prequel spin-off of Black-ish called Mixed-ish. Ross serves as a narrator for the series starring Tika Sumpter and Mark-Paul Gosselaar.

In 2020, Ross completed voice work as the title character and executive produced the adult animated comedy television movie Jodie, but the film lacks a studio or distributor. It was intended to be the first in a series of spin-offs based on MTV's Daria franchise. Ross voices the title character, Jodie Landon.

In 2020, Ross played the leading role of Grace Davis, a legendary superstar singer, in the musical comedy-drama film The High Note for Focus Features. The High Note marks the first big-screen role for Ross since the 2007 comedy-drama Daddy's Little Girls. The film was scheduled to be theatrically released on May 8, 2020, but the theatrical release was cancelled due to the COVID-19 pandemic. The film later moved its release date to May 29, 2020, through video on demand. In The High Note Ross made her singing debut, recording a soundtrack album titled The High Note (Original Motion Picture Soundtrack). The lead single, pop-ballad "Love Myself" was released on May 15, 2020, through Republic Records.

Ross emceed the second night of the 2020 Democratic National Convention. In September 2020, she signed a deal with ABC Signature. In 2021, she was included on the Time 100, Time's annual list of the 100 most influential people in the world.

From 2021 until 2023, Ross hosted the podcast I Am America.

In 2022, after the series finale of Black-ish, Ross appeared as Lainie in the seventh episode of the revived The Kids in the Hall, released in May 2022. She produced The Hair Tales, a limited docuseries for hulu and Oprah Winfrey Network. Later in 2022, she starred in the upcoming psychological thriller film, Cold Copy. She starred with Jeffrey Wright in the film American Fiction (2023) based on the novel Erasure. Also in 2023, she starred opposite Eddie Murphy in the holiday comedy Candy Cane Lane directed by Reginald Hudlin.

In 2025, Solo Traveling with Tracee Ellis Ross premiered on the Roku Channel. Over the course of the three-part series, Ross takes the audience along on her solo travels through Morocco, Mexico, and Spain. Variety reported in August 2025 that the series, having set records for the channel, was being renewed for a second season. The show won her the Daytime Emmy Award for Outstanding Travel and Adventure Program. Most recently, in 2026, she had signed an overall deal with Fox Entertainment Studios.

In 2026, it was announced that Ross would make her Broadway debut in the solo play Every Brilliant Thing, where she will succeed Mariska Hargitay and Daniel Radcliffe, who originated the role.

== Personal life ==
Throughout her career, Ross has been vocally childfree. In a February 2018 Glamour interview, she stated, "It's really interesting to be a woman and to get to 45 and not be married and not have kids. I'm a good friend, a solid daughter, a hard worker, my credit is good, I take out the garbage before it gets smelly, I recycle, and I won a Golden Globe!"

She endorsed Democratic presidential nominee Kamala Harris in the 2024 presidential election.

Ross is a member of Alpha Kappa Alpha.

== Filmography ==
=== Film ===
Key
†	Denotes works that have not yet been released

Year	Title	Role	Notes
1996	Far Harbor	Kiki	
1997	Sue Lost in Manhattan	Linda	
1999	A Fare to Remember	Jane	
2000	Hanging Up	Kim	
2000	In the Weeds	Caroline	
2006	I-See-You.Com	Nancy Tanaka	
2007	Daddy's Little Girls	Cynthia	
2009	Labor Pains	Kristin	
2019	Little	Homegirl	Voice
2020	The High Note	Grace Davis	
2023	Cold Copy	Diane Heger	
2023	American Fiction	Lisa Ellison	
2023	Candy Cane Lane	Carol Carver	
2023	Renaissance: A Film by Beyoncé	Herself	Cameo
2025	The Family McMullen	Nina Martin	

=== Television ===
Year	Title	Role	Notes
1998	Broken Silence	Kaycee King	Television film
2000	The Lyricist Lounge Show	Various roles	1 episode
2000–2008	Girlfriends	Joan Clayton	Series regular, 172 episodes
2004	Second Time Around	Naomi	Episode: "A Kiss Is Still a Kiss"
2007	Life Support	Tanya	Television film
2010	Private Practice	Ellen	Episode: "War"
2011	CSI: Crime Scene Investigation	Gloria Parkes	Recurring role, 4 episodes
2011	Reed Between the Lines	Dr. Carla Reed	Series regular, 25 episodes; producer
2011	Five	Alyssa	Television film; segment "Lili"
2012	Bad Girls	Rachel	Unsold pilot
2014–2022	Black-ish	Dr. Rainbow "Bow" Johnson	Lead role; director, 2 episodes; producer
2016	Lip Sync Battle	Herself	Episode: "Tracee Ellis Ross vs. Anthony Anderson"
2016	Broad City	Winona	Episode: "Jews on a Plane"
2015	The Odd Couple	Angry Taxi Driver (uncredited cameo)	
2018, 2022	Grown-ish	Dr. Rainbow "Bow" Johnson	2 episodes
2018	Portlandia	Professional In Getting Her Picture Taken	Episode: "You Do You"
2019–2021	Mixed-ish	Dr. Rainbow "Bow" Johnson/Narrator	Also co-creator, executive producer
2021	The Runaway Bunny	Narrator	Television special
2021	The Premise	Rayna Bradshaw	Episode: "Social Justice Sex Tape"
2022	The Kids in the Hall	Lainie	Episode: "Episode 7"
2022	Norman Lear: 100 Years of Music & Laughter	Herself	Television special
2025	Black Mirror	Gaynor	Episode: "Common People"
2025–2026	Solo Traveling with Tracee Ellis Ross	Herself	The Roku Channel original series (2 seasons)
TBA	Jodie †	Jodie Landon	Voice; completed production but dropped by MTV Entertainment Studios

=== Music videos ===
Year	Song	Artist	Role
2004	“The New Workout Plan”	Kanye West	Fifi LeBeouff/ Herself
2005	"Touch the Sky"	Kanye West	Herself
2018	"Nice for What"	Drake	Herself
2019	"Earfquake"	Tyler, the Creator	Pearl Edwards (Talk Show Host)

== Musical productions ==
Title	Years	Role	Location	Notes
Every Brilliant Thing	2026	Main narrator	Hudson Theatre (Broadway, New York City)	Written by Duncan Macmillan and Jonny Donahoe, Directed by Duncan Macmillan and Jeremy Herrin

== Discography ==
- The High Note (Original Motion Picture Soundtrack) (2020)

- "Love Myself" (single)
- "Stop for a Minute"
- "Bad Girl"
- "New to Me"
- "Like I Do" − with Kelvin Harrison Jr.
- "Love Myself" (Film Version) − with Amie Doherty

== Awards and nominations ==
Year	Award	Category	Nominated work	Result
2002	NAACP Image Award	Outstanding Actress in a Comedy Series	Girlfriends	Nominated
2003	Prism Award	Best Performance in a Comedy Series	Girlfriends	Nominated
2003	NAACP Image Award	Outstanding Actress in a Comedy Series	Girlfriends	Nominated
2004	BET Comedy Awards	Outstanding Lead Actress in a Comedy Series	Girlfriends	Nominated
2004	NAACP Image Award	Outstanding Actress in a Comedy Series	Girlfriends	Nominated
2005	BET Comedy Awards	Outstanding Lead Actress in a Comedy Series	Girlfriends	Won
2005	NAACP Image Award	Outstanding Actress in a Comedy Series	Girlfriends	Nominated
2006	NAACP Image Award	Outstanding Actress in a Comedy Series	Girlfriends	Nominated
2007	NAACP Image Award	Outstanding Actress in a Comedy Series	Girlfriends	Won
2008	NAACP Image Award	Outstanding Actress in a Comedy Series	Girlfriends	Nominated
2009	NAACP Image Award	Outstanding Directing in a Comedy Series	Girlfriends	Nominated
2009	NAACP Image Award	Outstanding Actress in a Comedy Series	Girlfriends	Won
2012	NAACP Image Award	Outstanding Actress in a Television Movie, Mini-Series or Dramatic Special	Five	Nominated
2012	NAACP Image Award	Outstanding Actress in a Comedy Series	Reed Between the Lines	Won
2012	Black Reel Awards	Outstanding Actress in a Television Movie or Mini-Series	Five	Nominated
2012	NAMIC Vision Award	Outstanding Actress in a Comedy Series	Reed Between the Lines	Nominated
2015	NAACP Image Award	Outstanding Actress in a Comedy Series	Black-ish	Won
2015	BET Awards	Best Actress	Black-ish	Nominated
2015	EWwy Awards	Best Actress, Comedy	Black-ish	Nominated
2016	Critics' Choice Television Award	Best Actress in a Comedy Series	Black-ish	Nominated
2016	NAACP Image Award	Outstanding Actress in a Comedy Series	Black-ish	Won
2016	Online Film & Television Association Award	Best Actress in a Comedy Series	Black-ish	Nominated
2016	Primetime Emmy Award	Outstanding Lead Actress in a Comedy Series	Black-ish	Nominated
2016	Satellite Award	Best Actress – Television Series Musical or Comedy	Black-ish	Nominated
2016	BET Awards	Best Actress	Black-ish	Nominated
2017	Critics' Choice Television Award	Best Actress in a Comedy Series	Black-ish	Nominated
2017	Golden Globe Award	Best Actress – Television Series Musical or Comedy	Black-ish	Won
2017	Screen Actors Guild Award	Outstanding Performance by an Ensemble in a Comedy Series	Black-ish	Nominated
2017	NAACP Image Award	Outstanding Actress in a Comedy Series	Black-ish	Won
2017	Primetime Emmy Award	Outstanding Lead Actress in a Comedy Series	Black-ish	Nominated
2018	Screen Actors Guild Award	Outstanding Performance by an Ensemble in a Comedy Series	Black-ish	Nominated
2018	NAACP Image Award	Outstanding Actress in a Comedy Series	Black-ish	Won
2018	Primetime Emmy Award	Outstanding Lead Actress in a Comedy Series	Black-ish	Nominated
2019	People's Choice Awards	Favorite Comedy TV Star	Black-ish	Nominated
2019	Satellite Awards	Best Actress in a Series, Comedy or Musical	Black-ish	Nominated
2019	NAACP Image Award	Outstanding Actress in a Comedy Series	Black-ish	Won
2019	Black Reel Awards	Outstanding Directing, Comedy Series	Black-ish	Nominated
2019	Black Reel Awards	Outstanding Actress, Comedy Series	Black-ish	Nominated
2020	NAACP Image Award	Outstanding Actress in a Comedy Series	Black-ish	Won
2020	Primetime Emmy Award	Outstanding Lead Actress in a Comedy Series	Black-ish	Nominated
2020	Black Reel Awards	Outstanding Comedy Series	Black-ish	Nominated
2020	Black Reel Awards	Outstanding Actress, Comedy Series	Black-ish	Nominated
2020	People's Choice Awards	Fashion icon	—N/a	Won
2020	People's Choice Awards	Favorite Drama Movie Star	The High Note	Nominated
2020	Hollywood Critics Association	Best Supporting Actress	The High Note	Nominated
2020	Guild of Music Supervisors Awards	Best Song Written and/or Recording Created for a Film	The High Note	Nominated
2021	NAACP Image Award	Outstanding Actress in a Motion Picture	The High Note	Nominated
2021	NAACP Image Award	Outstanding Actress in a Comedy Series	Black-ish	Nominated
2021	Primetime Emmy Award	Outstanding Lead Actress in a Comedy Series	Black-ish	Nominated
2021	Primetime Emmy Award	Outstanding Comedy Series	Black-ish	Nominated
2021	Black Reel Awards	Outstanding Actress, Comedy Series	Black-ish	Nominated
2021	Black Reel Awards	Outstanding Supporting Actress	Black-ish	Nominated
2021	Hollywood Critics Association Television Awards	Best Actress in a Broadcast Network or Cable Series, Comedy	Black-ish	Nominated
2022	People's Choice Awards	The Comedy TV Star of 2022	Black-ish	Nominated
2022	Golden Globe Award	Best Performance by an Actress in a Television Series − Musical or Comedy	Black-ish	Nominated
2022	Hollywood Critics Association Television Awards	Best Actress in a Broadcast Network or Cable Series, Comedy	Black-ish	Nominated
2022	NAACP Image Award	Outstanding Actress in a Comedy Series	Black-ish	Nominated
2022	Black Reel Awards	Outstanding Actress, Comedy Series	Black-ish	Nominated
2022	Disney Legends	For her extraordinary contribution to television	—N/a	Honored
2023	NAACP Image Award	Outstanding Actress in a Comedy Series	Black-ish	Nominated
2023	NAACP Image Award	Outstanding Host in a Talk or News / Information (Series or Special)	The Hair Tales	Nominated
2023	Screen Actors Guild Awards	Outstanding Performance by a Cast in a Motion Picture	American Fiction	Nominated
2026	Daytime Emmy Awards	Outstanding Travel and Adventure Program	Solo Traveling with Tracee Ellis Ross	Won

== Business ==
Tracee Ellis Ross is the founder of Pattern Beauty, a company that makes natural hair care products for curly and textured hair. The company was founded in 2018.

== See also ==
- African-American Jews
