= The Wolf Hour =

2019 film by Alistair Banks Griffin

- Theatrical release poster
- Directed by: Alistair Banks Griffin
- Written by: Alistair Banks Griffin
- Produced by: Brian Kavanaugh-Jones; Bradley Pilz; Bailey Conway Anglewicz
- Starring: Naomi Watts; Jennifer Ehle; Emory Cohen; Kelvin Harrison Jr.
- Cinematography: Khalid Mohtaseb
- Edited by: Robert Mead
- Music by: Danny Bensi; Saunder Jurriaans
- Production companies: Automatik; Bradley Pilz Productions; HanWay Films
- Distributed by: Brainstorm Media
- Release dates: January 26, 2019 (Sundance); December 6, 2019 (United States)
- Running time: 99 minutes
- Countries: United States; United Kingdom
- Language: English

The Wolf Hour is a 2019 psychological thriller film written and directed by Alistair Banks Griffin. It stars Naomi Watts, Jennifer Ehle, Emory Cohen, and Kelvin Harrison Jr.

The film had its world premiere at the Sundance Film Festival on January 26, 2019. It was released in the United States on December 6, 2019, by Brainstorm Media.

== Plot ==
In 1970s New York, former author June Leigh lives alone in her late grandmother's dilapidated apartment after cutting herself off from the outside world. Riddled with anxiety and agoraphobia, she spends her days watching the derelict neighbourhood below from her fourth-story window, amidst the notorious "Summer of Sam" in the blistering heat.

June is visited by her estranged friend, Margot, who is shocked to see June in such a depressive state. Margot helps her clear out her apartment and attempts to get her to go outside, but June suffers a panic attack. Meanwhile, June's intercom buzzes throughout the day but nobody is there when she answers. Margot gives June a .38 caliber gun for protection.

It is revealed that June's father died from a heart attack, and her family blamed her controversial writing, disowning her. June calls her publishing house and asks for an advance; they refuse, claiming she must submit something new soon. She attempts to write a new novel, but suffers writer's block.

One afternoon, June allows Freddie, the boy who delivers her groceries, to use her sink to wash himself, and they become friends. He reveals his mother died in a house fire while trying to get him out, leaving him severely burned. June calls the police when the intercom harassment continues. A police officer arrives and explains there is not much he can do, but suggests he can provide extra protection for her in return for sex.

Having avoided people for so long, a sexually frustrated June watches two neighbours have sex while masturbating. She later arranges for a male escort, Billy, to come to her apartment, and they have sex. Billy recounts being abused by his family as a child, claiming he got over his fears by facing them head on. He stays over, and they are awoken during the night by the intercom buzzing; Billy goes downstairs to investigate but nobody is there. He suggests the buzzings are a "calling", trying to get her to go outside. The following morning, June finds herself able to write.

June uses the last of her money to pay Freddie to deliver her completed new novel to the publishing house, but he does not return with her cheque. A blackout then hits, and rioting and looting begins in the area, leaving her alone and afraid in the dark. June watches a boy she thinks is Freddie being beaten by a cop and forces herself to leave the apartment, only to discover it is not him. Instead of retreating, she musters the confidence to walk down the street, staring up towards the morning sun as it rises in the sky.

The film concludes with June, now recovered from her mental illness, being interviewed on television about her new book. The show host asks her if the book is based on her self-inflicted isolation period, and she smiles wryly.

== Cast ==
- Naomi Watts as June Leigh
- Emory Cohen as Billy
- Jennifer Ehle as Margot
- Kelvin Harrison Jr. as Freddie
- Jeremy Bobb as Officer Blake
- Brennan Brown as Hans

== Production ==
In October 2017, it was announced Naomi Watts would star in the film, with Alistair Banks Griffin directing from a screenplay he wrote. In November 2017, Jennifer Ehle, Emory Cohen, Kelvin Harrison Jr., Brennan Brown and Jeremy Bobb joined the cast of the film.

== Release ==
The Wolf Hour had its world premiere at the Sundance Film Festival on January 26, 2019. Shortly afterward, Brainstorm Media acquired North American distribution rights to the film, with Universal Pictures Home Entertainment acquiring rights in a multi-territory deal encompassing Latin America, Benelux, Iceland, Italy, Scandinavia, Spain, Eastern Europe, Israel, the Middle East, Australia, New Zealand, Hong Kong, India, Indonesia, South Korea and Taiwan. It was released in select theaters in the United States on December 6, 2019.

== Critical reception ==
On the review aggregator website Rotten Tomatoes, the film holds an approval rating of 44% based on 25 reviews, with an average rating of 5.4/10. The website's consensus reads: "Naomi Watts gives it her all in The Wolf Hour, but it isn't enough to compensate for a film that spends too much of its runtime in search of a compelling story." On Metacritic, the film has a weighted average score of 42 out of 100 based on 6 critics, which the site labels as "mixed or average" reviews.
