= It Comes at Night =

- Theatrical release poster
- Directed by: Trey Edward Shults
- Written by: Trey Edward Shults
- Produced by: David Kaplan; Andrea Roa
- Starring: Joel Edgerton; Christopher Abbott; Carmen Ejogo; Riley Keough; Kelvin Harrison Jr.
- Cinematography: Drew Daniels
- Edited by: Trey Edward Shults; Matthew Hannam
- Music by: Brian McOmber
- Production companies: A24; Animal Kingdom
- Distributed by: A24
- Release dates: April 29, 2017 (Overlook Film Festival); June 9, 2017 (United States)
- Running time: 91 minutes
- Country: United States
- Language: English
- Budget: $5 million
- Box office: $20 million

It Comes at Night is a 2017 American psychological horror film written and directed by Trey Edward Shults. It stars Joel Edgerton, Christopher Abbott, Carmen Ejogo, Kelvin Harrison Jr., and Riley Keough. The film focuses on a family hiding in a forest as the Earth is taken over by a highly contagious disease.

The film had its premiere at the Overlook Film Festival at Timberline Lodge in Oregon on April 29, 2017, and was theatrically released on June 9, 2017, in the United States, by A24. It was positively received by critics but less well received by the general public, and grossed over $20 million worldwide.

== Plot ==
A contagious disease ravages the planet. Paul, Sarah and their teenage son Travis live a secluded lifestyle in their home, deep in the woods in an undisclosed location. After Sarah's father Bud contracts the disease, they euthanise him and burn his body.

That night, they capture an intruder breaking in. Paul ties him to a tree and places a bag over his head, leaving him there overnight to confirm he is not suffering from the disease. The stranger, Will, explains he was searching for fresh water for his wife and young son. Will offers to trade some food for water. Sarah suggests taking the strangers in, on the reasoning that with more people it would be easier to defend themselves. Paul reluctantly agrees and drives Will to collect his family. Along the way, they are ambushed by two men. Paul kills them, while accusing Will of setting him up. Will assuages Paul's mistrust.

Paul returns with Will, his wife Kim, and son Andrew. After establishing their rules, which include keeping the only entrance locked with a key Paul or Sarah wear around their neck, the two families establish a sense of normality and grow closer.

One day, Travis's dog Stanley begins barking aggressively at an unseen presence and chases it into the woods. Travis, who had followed Stanley, insists he heard something in the woods. That night, Will seemingly contradicts a story he told Paul earlier, resulting in Paul's increasing distrust of Will.

That evening, Travis discovers Andrew sleeping on the floor of Bud's old room, suffering from a nightmare. He also finds the front door of the house open. The families investigate, finding a bleeding and gravely sick Stanley on the floor. They euthanise and burn the dog. After Travis reveals the door was open, Sarah suggests that a sleepwalking Andrew opened the door, causing more distrust. Paul suspects Andrew is infected, and decides they should quarantine in their separate rooms to ensure no one is sick. That evening, Travis is awakened by a nightmare about his grandfather.

The next morning, Travis overhears Andrew crying constantly and Kim telling Will they need to leave. Travis informs his parents that he too may be infected. Paul and Sarah don protective masks and gloves, and take weapons to confront Kim and Will. Will draws a gun and takes Paul captive. He insists his family is healthy, repeatedly tells Andrew to keep his eyes shut and orders Paul to remove the mask. Will demands Paul give him a "fair share" of food and water so they can leave. Sarah and Paul overwhelm Will, and force him and his family outside. Will tries to beat Paul to death until Sarah shoots Will, killing him. Kim flees into the woods with Andrew. Paul fires at them, killing Andrew, then Kim.

Later, Travis awakens in bed, visibly sick. His mother comforts him as he dies. Paul and Sarah, now visibly infected, sit at the dinner table in silence. They share a shattered, devastated look.

== Cast ==
- Joel Edgerton as Paul, Sarah's husband and Travis's father
- Christopher Abbott as Will, Kim's husband and Andrew's father
- Carmen Ejogo as Sarah, Paul's wife, Travis's mother and Bud's daughter
- Riley Keough as Kim, Will's wife and Andrew's mother
- Kelvin Harrison Jr. as Travis, Paul and Sarah's son and Bud's grandson
- Griffin Robert Faulkner as Andrew, Will and Kim's son
- David Pendleton as Bud, Sarah's father and Travis's grandfather
- Mickey as Stanley, the family dog
- Chase Joliet and Mick O'Rourke as men who attack Paul and Will

== Production ==
Shults began writing the film after the death of his father as a way of dealing with the pain. He cites Pieter Bruegel the Elder's 1562 oil painting The Triumph of Death as inspiration and it features prominently in the movie and its first trailer. Although the film is post-apocalyptic Shults did not look to any other such films as inspiration; instead, he cited the work of Paul Thomas Anderson and John Cassavetes and the films Night of the Living Dead and The Shining as inspirations. To the later point, the film takes some influences from The Shining's Overlook Hotel in that the layout of the house is deliberately vague and never properly established. Shults has described it "as this kind of labyrinth" and a metaphor for "the mesh of Travis' head".

In June 2016, Joel Edgerton joined the cast of the film. In August 2016, it was announced that Christopher Abbott, Riley Keough and Carmen Ejogo had also joined the cast.

=== Filming ===
Principal photography began in August 2016 in New York.

== Release ==
The film had its world premiere at Overlook Film Festival at Timberline Lodge, Oregon, on April 29, 2017. The film was scheduled to be released on August 25, 2017, but was rescheduled for June 9, 2017.

== Reception ==
=== Box office ===
It Comes at Night grossed $14 million in the United States and Canada and $5.7 million in other territories for a worldwide total of $19.7 million.

It Comes at Night was released alongside The Mummy and Megan Leavey, and was expected to gross around $7 million from 2,533 theaters in its opening weekend, with a chance of making as much as $12 million. It made $700,000 from Thursday night previews and $2.4 million on its first day. It ended up debuting to $6 million, finishing 6th at the box office. Deadline Hollywood noted the film's poor audience word-of-mouth led to a drop of potential Saturday and Sunday sales.

=== Critical response ===
On Rotten Tomatoes, the film holds an approval rating of 88% based on 256 reviews, with an average rating of 7.4/10. The site's critical consensus reads, "It Comes at Night makes lethally effective use of its bare-bones trappings while proving once again that what's left unseen can be just as horrifying as anything on the screen." On Metacritic, the film has a weighted average score 78 out of 100, based on 43 critics, indicating "generally favorable" reviews. Audiences polled by CinemaScore gave the film an average grade of "D" on an A+ to F scale.

Brian Tallerico of RogerEbert.com gave the film a thumbs up, saying "It is a movie in which the villains are loss, grief, pain, fear and distrust — very human emotions — and it has no traditional brain-eaters." He added that "it is one of the most terrifying films in years". Mark Kermode wrote in The Observer, "there are no bad guys here – just suspicion, isolation and contagion. It's a grim vision of a world losing track of objective facts, descending into a poisonous abyss of chaos and disorder. No wonder it strikes such a contemporary chord." He gave the film 4/5 stars. The Times's Ed Potton also gave it 4/5 stars, writing, "The 'It' of the title refers to the contagious disease that has devastated the outside world (a world that, like much in this beautifully minimalist film, we never see), but it also denotes something even more virulent and destructive: human fear." David Sims of The Atlantic called it "A fairly straightforward post-apocalyptic story, tightly focused on human torment, but suffused with surprising, undeniably atmospheric sights and sounds."

Vanity Fair's Richard Lawson was more critical, writing, "without exploring the fullness of the world he's made, all Shults can do is try to shock us with brutality. Which, sadly, doesn't shock anymore so much as it exhausts us... To my mind, It Comes at Night traffics in a fatally depthless cruelty." Mick LaSalle of the San Francisco Chronicle wrote, "It is not unreasonable for an audience to be interested in these questions when our interest is generated by the film itself. In the absence of such answers, or the intimation of such answers, or even of characters in pursuit of answers, It Comes at Night begins to seem thin, a torment without purpose."

=== Accolades ===
Kelvin Harrison Jr. was nominated for Breakthrough Actor at the Gotham Independent Film Awards 2017.

== See also ==
- Retreat, a film with some similar details in its plot.
