= Love Myself (Tracee Ellis Ross song) =

Single by Tracee Ellis Ross

from the album The High Note (Original Motion Picture Soundtrack)
- Released: May 15, 2020
- Recorded: 2020
- Genre: Pop
- Length: 3:27
- Label: Republic; Universal
- Songwriters: Sarah Aarons; Greg Kurstin

Music video
- "Love Myself" on YouTube

"Love Myself" is the debut single by American actress and singer Tracee Ellis Ross. It was released on May 15, 2020 through Republic, Universal and Focus Features as the lead single from soundtrack album from 2020 musical film The High Note starring Ross. The song was written by Sarah Aarons and Greg Kurstin.

== Background ==
The song was written by Sarah Aarons and Greg Kurstin. Tracee Ellis Ross who is the daughter of the Motown singer Diana Ross, made her singing debut in The High Note playing Grace Davis, a superstar who is advised by her team not to release new music because she is “too old.” “Love Myself” first premiered on February 15, 2020 at the Ross' interview to Oprah Winfrey at Dallas' American Airlines Center of her Oprah's 2020 Vision Tour with WW.

== Release history ==
Region	Date	Format	Label	Ref.
Various	May 15, 2020	Digital download; streaming	Republic	
