= The High Note =

2020 film by Nisha Ganatra

- Release poster
- Directed by: Nisha Ganatra
- Written by: Flora Greeson
- Produced by: Tim Bevan; Eric Fellner
- Starring: Dakota Johnson; Tracee Ellis Ross; Kelvin Harrison Jr.; Zoë Chao; Bill Pullman; Eddie Izzard; Ice Cube
- Cinematography: Jason McCormick
- Edited by: Wendy Greene Bricmont
- Music by: Amie Doherty
- Production companies: Working Title Films; Perfect World Pictures
- Distributed by: Focus Features (United States); Universal Pictures (International)
- Release date: May 29, 2020
- Running time: 113 minutes
- Country: United States
- Language: English
- Budget: <$20 million
- Box office: $2.5 million (Note: Although many theaters around the world closed due to COVID-19 and the film went to VOD, The High Note played domestically at several theaters, grossing $420,000 by June 28, 2020, as well as $2.1 million from foreign territories. These figures do not include the revenue made from VOD sales.)

The High Note is a 2020 American comedy drama film directed by Nisha Ganatra and written by Flora Greeson. It stars Dakota Johnson, Tracee Ellis Ross, Kelvin Harrison Jr., Zoë Chao, Bill Pullman, Eddie Izzard, and Ice Cube, and follows a famous singer's personal assistant who wants to become a music producer.

The film was released in select theaters and through premium video on demand (PVOD) in the United States on May 29, 2020, by Focus Features. It received mixed reviews from critics, although the cast was praised.

== Plot ==
Maggie Sherwoode is the longtime personal assistant to legendary R&B singer Grace Davis, who still has a successful touring career despite not releasing new material for a decade. Also an aspiring music producer, Maggie remixes Grace's songs in her free time. Grace's egocentric manager, Jack Robertson, believes that her time has passed and she should accept a Las Vegas residency and release live albums rather than record new material.

At a grocery store, Maggie meets aspiring musician David Cliff, watching him perform outdoors. He invites her to a party at his house, where to her surprise she learns that despite slumming it as a musician he is quite wealthy. Impressed by his voice, Maggie lies about being a professional producer and offers to work with him on an album. David accepts and they begin work together with Maggie coaching him through his nerves.

Grace is displeased when a famous music producer modernizes one of her songs, remixing it with excessive synths and pop elements. Appalled, Maggie shows her own version of the song, and she releases Maggie's version, without payment or credit. While pleased to be producing for her, Jack pulls her aside to reveal how her tactlessness ruined potential future deals.

When Grace later expresses her interest in recording a new album to her record label, they discourage her, pushing her towards the Vegas residency. When Maggie encourages Grace to disregard the label and create new material, Grace lectures her on how women of her age ("over 40") and race rarely succeed in releasing new material after successful earlier careers.

Maggie and David begin a romance as recording for his demo comes to a close. At the same time, she learns that Ariana Grande has backed out of opening for Grace's album launch. She initially books Dan Deakins to open for Grace before realizing it would be the perfect place for David to perform his songs. She enlists Dan's assistant to help but is surprised when Dan himself, after listening to David's songs, decides to step away to allow him to perform.

On the night of the party, Maggie tells Jack and Grace that Dan has backed out and promises to fix it. She then asks David, who believed they were going on a date, to sing. Hearing that the party is for Grace Davis, David leaves in a huff, refusing to perform. Maggie tells Jack and Grace she was unable to deliver a backup performer and Grace berates her, mocking her ambitions to become a producer when she cannot even succeed as an assistant before firing her.

Maggie moves back home with her father Max, a radio DJ, and starts planning her future. After encouragement from him, she reaches out to David to continue work on their album and to Grace to thank her for her time working for her. At the same time, Grace realizes that she misses Maggie, who was a faithful assistant who never used her.

Grace arrives at Maggie's home and offers a roundabout apology. After complimenting her production work on the live album, she reveals that she has never worked with a female producer before but wants Maggie to be the first, also telling her that she has begun writing new material.

While Grace is singing for her, David arrives. Before Maggie can introduce them, he reveals that Grace is his estranged mother, something she has kept from the public. He also tells her that Dan Deakins has been passing around his material leading him to an offer of representation from a studio.

Later, David performs at a music festival. He asks Grace to join him on stage, revealing she is his mother, and they sing a duet as Maggie watches. Later in the studio, Maggie produces Grace's new album.

== Cast ==
- Dakota Johnson as Maggie Sherwoode
- Tracee Ellis Ross as Grace Davis
- Kelvin Harrison Jr. as David Cliff
- Zoë Chao as Katie
- Ice Cube as Jack Robertson
- Jonathan Freeman as Martin
- June Diane Raphael as Gail
- Deniz Akdeniz as Spencer Cliff
- Bill Pullman as Max
- Eddie Izzard as Dan Deakins
- Diplo as Richie Williams
- Eugene Cordero as Seth
- Marc Evan Jackson as Alec
- Neil Lane as himself
- Melanie Griffith as Tess
- Uttera Singh as Theresa

== Production ==
Flora Greeson's screenplay, then titled Covers, was featured in the 2018 Black List, compiling the year's best unproduced scripts. In February 2019, it was announced Nisha Ganatra would direct the film, and that Tim Bevan and Eric Fellner would produce it under their Working Title Films banner. In May 2019, it was announced that Dakota Johnson, Tracee Ellis Ross, Kelvin Harrison Jr. and Zoë Chao had joined the cast, and Ice Cube and June Diane Raphael were added in June. Bill Pullman, Eddie Izzard and Diplo eventually joined the cast as well.

Principal photography began in May 2019 around Los Angeles. In February 2020 the film was re-titled The High Note.

== Soundtrack ==
The High Note soundtrack was released on May 29, 2020, through Republic, Universal. The lead single, "Love Myself" by Ross, was released on May 15.

The High Note (Original Motion Picture Soundtrack)
No.	Title	Writer(s)	Performer(s)	Length
1.	"Love Myself"	Sarah Aarons; Greg Kurstin	Tracee Ellis Ross	3:27
2.	"Stop for a Minute"	Ina Wroldsen; Rodney Jerkins	Ross	3:36
3.	"Let's Stay Together"		Kelvin Harrison Jr.	3:08
4.	"Share Your Love with Me"		Aretha Franklin	3:18
5.	"You Send Me"		Kelvin Harrison Jr.	2:53
6.	"Oh No Not My Baby"		Maxine Brown	2:37
7.	"Bad Girl"		Ross	2:51
8.	"Track 8"	Aarons; Ajay Bhattacharyya; Lennon Stella	Harrison Jr.	3:22
9.	"Mind Over Matter"		Anthony Ramos	2:36
10.	"Chemistry"	Brittany "Chi" Coney; Denisia "Blu June" Andrews; Travis Marsh	Harris Jr.	3:01
11.	"Jealous Guy" (Live at the Bitter End 1971)		Donny Hathaway	3:09
12.	"New to Me"	Corinne Bailey Rae; Steve Brown	Ross	3:21
13.	"Like I Do"	Aarons	Harrison Jr.; Ross	2:54
14.	"You Send Me" (Darkchild Mix)		Harrison Jr.	2:59
15.	"Love Myself" (Film Version)		Ross	3:39

== Release ==
The High Note was originally scheduled for a wide theatrical release on May 8, 2020, but due to movie theater closures beginning in mid-March, due to the COVID-19 pandemic, it was cancelled.

The film made $87,800 from 50 theaters (mostly drive-ins) in its opening weekend. In its third weekend it made $59,000 from 64 theaters, for a running total of $293,000. By June 28, it had grossed $420,000 in the United States. It was also released in several countries with relaxed COVID-19 theater restrictions, including South Korea, the Netherlands and France, and grossed $1.7 million as of August 28.

== Reception ==
=== VOD sales ===
In its opening weekend, The High Note was the second-most rented film on FandangoNow, third-most from the iTunes Store, and 11th-most on Amazon Prime Video. In its second weekend it fell to fourth on FandangoNow and 10th on iTunes, but ranked second on Spectrum. It remained in the top 10 on all services in its third weekend. After lowering its rental price, it returned to the #10 spot on FandangoNow and Apple TV in mid-July.

=== Critical response ===
On the review aggregator website Rotten Tomatoes, the film holds an approval rating of 71% based on 189 reviews, with an average rating of 6.1/10. The website's critics consensus reads, "The High Note doesn't quite soar above rom-com formula, but audiences seeking some comfort viewing should find themselves solidly in harmony with this well-acted genre entry." On Metacritic, the film has a weighted average score of 58 out of 100, based on 34 critics, indicating "mixed or average" reviews.

Writing for Forbes, Scott Mendelson gave the film a positive review, writing: "It's leisurely-paced, relatively grounded and rooted in the specific pleasures of watching good actors play nice people who deal with their specific conflicts as nicely as possible."

Owen Gleiberman of Variety said the film "can't decide if it's a behind-the-music-industry drama or a go-for-your-dream fairy tale" and that "the feel-good factor hovers over this movie like a fuzzy bland cloud."

The Guardian ranked The High Note 47th on its list of the "50 best films of 2020 in the US".

=== Accolades ===
- Drama Movie by People's Choice Awards (nominated)
- Drama Movie Star by People's Choice Awards – Tracee Ellis Ross (nominated)
