= Waves (2019 film) =

2019 American drama film

- Theatrical release poster
- Directed by: Trey Edward Shults
- Written by: Trey Edward Shults
- Produced by: Kevin Turen; James Wilson; Trey Edward Shults
- Starring: Kelvin Harrison Jr.; Taylor Russell; Sterling K. Brown; Renée Elise Goldsberry; Alexa Demie; Lucas Hedges
- Cinematography: Drew Daniels
- Edited by: Trey Edward Shults; Isaac Hagy
- Music by: Trent Reznor; Atticus Ross
- Production companies: Guy Grand Productions; JW Films
- Distributed by: A24 (United States); Focus Features Universal Pictures (International)
- Release dates: August 30, 2019 (Telluride); November 15, 2019 (United States)
- Running time: 135 minutes
- Country: United States
- Language: English
- Budget: $6 million
- Box office: $2.6 million

Waves is a 2019 American psychological drama film written, produced and directed by Trey Edward Shults. Along with Shults, it was produced by Kevin Turen and James Wilson. It stars Kelvin Harrison Jr., Taylor Russell, Lucas Hedges, Alexa Demie, Renée Elise Goldsberry, and Sterling K. Brown. It traces the emotional journey of a suburban American family as they navigate love, forgiveness and coming together in the wake of a tragic loss.

Principal photography began on July 9, 2018, in Broward County, Florida and wrapped up on August 24, 2018. The cast was announced in July, with Demie joining in August.

It had its world premiere at the Telluride Film Festival on August 30, 2019, and was released in the United States on November 15, 2019, by A24. It received positive reviews from critics, who praised the performances (particularly that of Harrison, Russell, and Brown), cinematography, and Shults' direction.

== Plot ==
Tyler Williams is a popular high school senior on the wrestling team. He parties with his friends and spends time with his girlfriend, Alexis Lopez, but is routinely pushed to be better by his domineering father, Ronald. Unbeknownst to anyone, Tyler suffers from a Level 5 SLAP tear, which he keeps secret from his family and team by stealing his father's painkillers. Against the recommendation of his doctor, Tyler continues to wrestle competitively until he is thrown onto his shoulder during a match, causing irreparable damage and ending his season, as well as his career. Tyler's life is further complicated when he receives a text from Alexis, who reveals that her period is late, indicating that she is pregnant. He takes her to get an abortion, but she has a last-minute change of heart. While Tyler is driving Alexis home, they have a fight over her decision to not get the abortion, and Alexis walks home alone.

Distraught, Tyler begins drinking heavily and abusing drugs. Eventually, Tyler texts Alexis, who is willing to mend their relationship. She tells Tyler that she has decided to keep the child with support from her family, but when Tyler demands to speak to her in person, Alexis breaks up with him and blocks his number, sending him into a rage as he destroys his bedroom. The night of the school's "Maverick Ball", a grounded Tyler goes on Instagram and sees a picture showing Alexis posing with another boy. He gets drunk and high and attempts to leave the house, but is confronted by his stepmom, Catherine. His father attempts to defuse the situation, but Tyler pushes him to the floor and leaves.

He drives to a house party, where he sees Alexis go upstairs with the boy from the photo. Tyler's younger sister Emily notices his arrival from a distance but says nothing, and Tyler drinks heavily before following Alexis to the garage. An exchange of words leads to an argument, which turns physical when Alexis tries to walk away from Tyler. He punches her, causing her head to hit the floor. She begins to bleed out, and, horrified by what he has just done, Tyler flees. Ronald arrives shortly after, finding Emily, who tearfully confirms Ronald's suspicions. Tyler returns home before attempting to run away on foot. However, he is quickly caught and arrested by the police. Paramedics attempt to resuscitate Alexis, but she dies from her injuries.

Despite a guilty plea, Tyler is sentenced to life in prison for second-degree murder, with the eligibility of parole after thirty years. After school one day, Emily is approached by Luke, an awkward but kindhearted classmate who was also one of Tyler's wrestling teammates. He asks her out to lunch and the two begin dating. Emily begins to open up to Luke, participating in activities outside of school with him, such as swimming with manatees. During this time, Emily also overhears Ronald and Catherine arguing about Tyler, with Ronald blaming Catherine for her lack of presence in his and Emily's lives, and Catherine accusing Ronald of putting too much pressure on Tyler. During a conversation they have while fishing, Emily reveals to Ronald that she feels guilty, believing that she could have stopped Tyler and that she hates him for what he did. Ronald advises her not to hold a grudge against her brother and that no matter what, he loves them both. The two reconcile.

Meanwhile, Emily and Luke become closer, eventually having sex for the first time. Emily learns from Luke that his estranged, abusive father is dying of cancer, and she urges him to make amends with him with the time he has left, as Emily and Tyler's mother died from a drug overdose when they were young. The two drive to Columbia, Missouri, where Luke's father is residing, and upon seeing his son, Luke's father's spirits are lifted, with Luke forgiving his father. He survives longer than expected, but dies one night, which causes Luke to heavily sob. Emily consoles Luke on the drive home to Miami while Catherine visits Tyler in prison, Alexis' parents grieve, and Ronald reconnects with Catherine. Sometime after arriving home, Emily rides her bike down an empty street and lifts her arms from the handlebars.

== Cast ==
- Kelvin Harrison Jr. as Tyler Williams, a high school senior and competitive wrestler
- Taylor Russell as Emily Williams, Tyler's younger sister
- Sterling K. Brown as Ronald Williams, Tyler and Emily's father
- Lucas Hedges as Luke, one of Tyler's teammates and Emily's love interest
- Renée Elise Goldsberry as Catherine Williams, Tyler and Emily's stepmother
- Alexa Demie as Alexis Lopez, Tyler's girlfriend
- Clifton Collins Jr. as Bobby Lopez, Alexis' father
- Vivi Pineda as Elena Lopez, Alexis' mother
- Neal Huff as Bill, Luke's father
- Bill Wise as Coach Wise
- David Garelik as Ryan, a friend of Tyler
- Ruben E.A. Brown as Wally
- Harmony Korine as Mr. Stanley
- Krisha Fairchild as English Teacher
- Caitlyn Cukras as Student in Stands

== Production ==
Kevin Turen and James Wilson served as producers on the film, with A24 producing and distributing and with Trey Edward Shults directing, producing, from a screenplay he wrote.

According to Adam White of The Independent, Shults did not envision a specific racial ethnicity for the family when he wrote the script, and it was only after black actors were cast that references to the characters' race were added to the story. Sterling K. Brown told Variety, "I've never seen a middle to upper middle class black family dealing with the problems that [the family] has in this movie".

Shults' vision for the film only came together after forming a close relationship with Kelvin Harrison Jr., who plays Tyler. This allowed Harrison Jr. to have creative input on the film, hiring a close friend Taylor Russell to play the role of his little sister Emily.

Russell stated in an interview with Variety that Harrison had a lot of help in getting her the role, even admitting to breaking the "rules", as Harrison himself had sent Russell the script in secret weeks before auditioning, going off his belief that he and Russell would play great siblings.

Alexa Demie, who plays Alexis, was cast later on in the film. Recalling in an interview how she had met Harrison weeks before production, and heard about the film directly from him a few days later.

=== Casting ===
In July 2018, it was announced that Lucas Hedges, Sterling K. Brown, Kelvin Harrison Jr., and Taylor Russell had joined the cast of the film. In August 2018, Alexa Demie joined the cast.

=== Filming ===
Principal photography began on July 9, 2018, in Broward County, Florida and Key Biscayne, Florida. Some filming was done in Hollywood, Florida.

Demie suggested a scene where Alexis and Emily meet in a restroom, with the scene implying a change of focus from one woman to the other. Lauren McCarthy of Nylon stated that the film had a "collaborative nature" style.

Demie stated that the filming of the initial driving scene made it seem like a film crew was not present. Demie also stated that Alexis, compared to Maddy Perez in Euphoria, another character Demie portrayed, "is much stronger, she’s always fighting back and setting boundaries".

=== Music ===
Trent Reznor and Atticus Ross composed the film's score, replacing Shults' frequent collaboration with Brian McOmber. In an interview, Shults stated, "I got one of the coolest e-mails of my life one day that Trent Reznor was a fan and wanted to meet. I got on a plane as soon as I could and went to L.A. and met him and Atticus for lunch. Instantly, the energy was great. They had seen and dug my other movies and just wanted to work together." The score was released on November 26, 2019, on Nine Inch Nails' online store.

The film's soundtrack features a compilation of contemporary rap, R&B, alternative, and experimental pop music from artists including Animal Collective, Tame Impala, Frank Ocean, A$AP Rocky, Kendrick Lamar, The Shoes, H.E.R., Tyler, the Creator, Fuck Buttons, Amy Winehouse, Kanye West, THEY., Kid Cudi, Colin Stetson, SZA, Chance the Rapper, Radiohead, and Alabama Shakes. The full list of songs used in the film was made available on A24's website, in an article where Shults annotates the usage of the songs.

Shults wrote specific music cues into the screenplay such as Lamar's "Backseat Freestyle" and embedded files into the scripts sent to actors so they could listen to the intended songs for each scene. He shot the film having not yet acquired the rights to certain songs and agreed to cut scenes if negotiations failed, than reshoot. A letter and rough cut of the film was sent to Ocean, who cleared his songs for use after watching. Negotiations with West stretched over months before "I Am a God" was approved with a stipulation that a "clean" version would need to be featured due to West moving away from secular music.

== Release ==
Waves premiered at the Telluride Film Festival on August 30, 2019. It screened at the Toronto International Film Festival on September 10, 2019. It was released on November 15, 2019, in New York City and Los Angeles, expanding to major U.S. cities the week after, with a wide release set for December 6. In September, Focus Features acquired the international distribution rights to the film, excluding Canada, China and Japan.

== Reception ==
=== Box office ===
Despite its success among critics, the film was a box office failure, grossing $2.6 million worldwide against a production budget of $6 million. Waves grossed a total of $1.7 million in the United States. In its limited opening weekend, the film made $134,333 from four theaters, a per-venue average of $33,583. Expanding to 21 theaters the following weekend the film made $168,760, and then $140,995 from 44 theaters in its third.

=== Critical response ===
On review aggregator Rotten Tomatoes, the film holds an approval rating of 84% based on 254 reviews, with an average rating of 7.8/10. The site's consensus reads: "An up-close look at one family's emotional ups and downs, Waves captures complicated dynamics with tenderness and grace." On Metacritic, the film has a weighted average score of 80 out of 100, based on 45 critics, indicating "generally favorable reviews".

Shults' direction and the performances of Harrison, Russell and Brown garnered praise along with the cinematography and music. Paul Whitington of the Irish Independent gave the film five stars. Brian Tallerico, editor of RogerEbert.com, gave it four out of four stars, calling the film "unexpectedly ambitious and confident". He praised Shults' directing, as well as the film's sound design and Trent Reznor and Atticus Ross' score, and wrote "This is a deeper and more profound film than your average character drama, a masterpiece that's hard to walk away from without checking your own grievances and grief."

IndieWire's Eric Kohn gave the film a B+, stating "It's a definitive statement on the present moment, evoking the sheer horror of every uncertain exchange, and the courage involved in moving ahead regardless of what it means for the future". Justin Chang of the Los Angeles Times called it "deeply rooted in its characters' consciousness, alert to the feelings of dread, shame, rage and despair that threaten to bring these fast-moving lives to a standstill". It was chosen by the National Board of Review as one of the ten best films of the year.

Prince Shakur of Teen Vogue stated that Tyler's story shows the effects of "toxic masculinity". Harrison stated that due to the previously inferior position in society occupied by African-Americans, there is often "a pressure placed on young Black boys to excel".

Writing for The Face, Ludwig Hurtado said the film was part of a genre he termed "Tampa-core", which he described as presenting a "hyper-stylised vision of Florida" with "all the violence and drama of a classic western"; he included Zola and Spring Breakers as comparable titles.

=== Accolades ===
Award	Date of ceremony	Category	Recipient(s)	Result	Ref(s)
African-American Film Critics Association	December 11, 2019	Breakout Performance	Kelvin Harrison Jr.	Won	
African-American Film Critics Association	December 11, 2019	Top 10 Films	Waves	Won	
African-American Film Critics Association	December 11, 2019	We See You Award	Taylor Russell	Won	
Austin Film Critics Association	February 7, 2020	Best Score	Trent Reznor and Atticus Ross	Nominated	
Black Reel Awards	February 6, 2020	Outstanding Motion Picture	Trey Edward Shults, Kevin Turen, and James Wilson	Nominated	
Black Reel Awards	February 6, 2020	Outstanding Actor	Kelvin Harrison Jr.	Nominated	
Black Reel Awards	February 6, 2020	Outstanding Breakthrough Performance, Male	Kelvin Harrison Jr.	Won	
Black Reel Awards	February 6, 2020	Outstanding Supporting Actor	Sterling K. Brown	Nominated	
Black Reel Awards	February 6, 2020	Outstanding Supporting Actress	Taylor Russell	Nominated	
Black Reel Awards	February 6, 2020	Outstanding Breakthrough Performance, Female	Taylor Russell	Nominated	
Black Reel Awards	February 6, 2020	Outstanding Ensemble	Avy Kaufman	Nominated	
Black Reel Awards	February 6, 2020	Outstanding Original Score	Trent Reznor and Atticus Ross	Nominated	
Black Reel Awards	February 6, 2020	Outstanding Cinematography	Drew Daniels	Nominated	
Casting Society of America	January 31, 2020	Studio or Independent – Drama	Avy Kaufman and Mark Mullen	Nominated	
Chicago Film Critics Association	July 28, 2020	Most Promising Performer	Taylor Russell	Nominated	
Film Independent Spirit Awards	February 8, 2020	Best Supporting Female	Taylor Russell	Nominated	
Georgia Film Critics Association	January 10, 2020	Breakthrough Award	Kelvin Harrison Jr.	Nominated	
Georgia Film Critics Association	January 10, 2020	Breakthrough Award	Taylor Russell	Nominated	
Gotham Awards	December 2, 2019	Best Feature	Waves	Nominated	
Gotham Awards	December 2, 2019	Breakthrough Actor	Taylor Russell	Won	
Gotham Awards	December 2, 2019	Audience Award	Waves	Nominated	
Hamptons International Film Festival	October 10, 2019	Zicherman Screenplay Award	Trey Edward Shults & A24	Won	
Hollywood Critics Association	January 11, 2020	Best Picture	Waves	Nominated	
Hollywood Critics Association	January 11, 2020	Best Supporting Actor	Sterling K. Brown	Nominated	
Hollywood Critics Association	January 11, 2020	Best Supporting Actress	Taylor Russell	Nominated	
Hollywood Critics Association	January 11, 2020	Breakthrough Actor	Kelvin Harrison Jr.	Won	
Hollywood Critics Association	January 11, 2020	Breakthrough Actor	Taylor Russell	Nominated	
Hollywood Critics Association	January 11, 2020	Best Cast	Cast of Waves	Nominated	
Hollywood Critics Association	January 11, 2020	Best Independent Film	Waves	Won (Note: Tied with The Farewell.)	
Hollywood Critics Association	January 11, 2020	Best Cinematography	Drew Daniels	Nominated	
Hollywood Critics Association	January 11, 2020	Best Score	Trent Reznor and Atticus Ross	Nominated	
NAACP Image Awards	February 22, 2020	Outstanding Supporting Actor in a Motion Picture	Sterling K. Brown	Nominated	
Motion Picture Sound Editors	January 19, 2020	Outstanding Achievement in Sound Editing - Music Score for Feature Film	Sally Boldt, Trey Edward Shults, Johnnie Burn	Won	
National Board of Review	January 3, 2020	Top Films	Waves	Won	
New York Film Critics Online	December 7, 2019	Breakthrough Performance	Kelvin Harrison Jr.	Won	
San Diego Film Critics Society	December 9, 2019	Breakthrough Artist	Kelvin Harrison Jr.	Nominated	
Santa Barbara International Film Festival	January 2020	Virtuoso Award	Taylor Russell	Won	
Seattle Film Critics Society	December 16, 2019	Best Supporting Actress	Taylor Russell	Nominated	
St. Louis Film Critics Association	December 15, 2019	Best Film	Waves	Runner-up	
St. Louis Film Critics Association	December 15, 2019	Best Soundtrack	Waves	2nd place	
Washington D.C. Area Film Critics Association	December 8, 2019	Best Cinematography	Drew Daniels	Nominated	

== See also ==
- List of black films of the 2010s
