= Burning Cane =

- Theatrical release poster
- Directed by: Phillip Youmans
- Written by: Phillip Youmans
- Produced by: Ojo Akinlana; Karen Kaia Livers; Mose Mayer; Wendell Pierce; Isaac Webb; Cassandra Youmans; Jakob Johnson
- Starring: Wendell Pierce; Karen Kaia Livers; Dominique McClellan; Braelyn Kelly
- Cinematography: Phillip Youmans
- Edited by: Phillip Youmans; Ruby Kline
- Music by: Kevin Gullage
- Production company: Denizen Pictures
- Distributed by: Array Releasing
- Release dates: April 25, 2019 (Tribeca Film Festival); October 25, 2019 (United States)
- Running time: 77 minutes
- Country: United States
- Language: English

Burning Cane is a 2019 American drama film written and directed by Phillip Youmans in his feature directorial debut. The film stars Wendell Pierce, Karen Kaia Livers, Dominique McClellan and Braelyn Kelly. Set in rural Louisiana, we follow Helen Wayne, a deeply religious mother, as she tries to mend both her self-destructive son and the alcoholic pastor of her church. The film was released on October 25, 2019, by Array Releasing.

== Cast ==
- Wendell Pierce as Reverend Tillman
- Karen Kaia Livers as Helen Wayne
- Dominique McClellan as Daniel Wayne
- Braelyn Kelly as Jeremiah Wayne

== Release ==
The film premiered at the Tribeca Film Festival on April 25, 2019. On September 5, 2019, Array Releasing acquired distribution rights to the film. The film was released theatrically on October 25, 2019, by Array Releasing. Burning Cane premiered on Netflix November 6, 2019.

== Reception ==
Burning Cane received generally positive reviews from film critics. Review aggregation website Rotten Tomatoes gives it a 92% approval rating, based on reviews from 48 critics. The site's critical consensus states: "Burning Cane is a compelling look at weighty themes -- and a remarkably assured debut from an impressively talented young filmmaker." Metacritic gives the film a rating of 74 out of 100, based on reviews from 11 critics, indicating "generally favorable" reviews. The film won three awards at Tribeca Film Festival: "Founder Award for Best Narrative Feature", "Best Actor", and "Best Cinematography."

== See also ==
- List of African American films of the 2010s
