= 2019 Sundance Film Festival =

Film festival

- Festival poster
- Location: Park City, Salt Lake City, and Sundance, Utah
- Hosted by: Sundance Institute
- Festival date: January 24 to February 3, 2019
- Language: English
- Website: sundance.org/festival
- 2020 Sundance Film Festival 2018 Sundance Film Festival

The 2019 Sundance Film Festival took place from January 24 to February 3, 2019. The first lineup of competition films was announced on November 28, 2018.

== Films ==
=== U.S. Dramatic Competition ===
- Before You Know It by Hannah Pearl Utt
- Big Time Adolescence by Jason Orley
- Blush by Debra Eisenstadt festival titled Imaginary Order
- Brittany Runs a Marathon by Paul Downs Colaizzo
- Clemency by Chinonye Chukwu
- The Farewell by Lulu Wang
- Hala by Minhal Baig
- Honey Boy by Alma Har'el
- The Last Black Man in San Francisco by Joe Talbot
- Luce by Julius Onah
- Ms. Purple by Justin Chon
- Native Son by Rashid Johnson
- Share by Pippa Bianco
- The Sound of Silence by Michael Tyburski
- Them That Follow by Britt Poulton and Dan Savage
- To the Stars by Martha Stephens

=== U.S. Documentary Competition ===
- Always in Season by Jacqueline Olive
- American Factory by Steven Bognar and Julia Reichert
- Apollo 11 by Todd Douglas Miller
- Bedlam by Kenneth Paul Rosenberg
- David Crosby: Remember My Name by A.J. Eaton
- Hail Satan? by Penny Lane
- Jawline by Liza Mandelup
- Knock Down the House by Rachel Lears
- Midnight Family by Luke Lorentzen
- Mike Wallace Is Here by Avi Belkin
- Moonlight Sonata: Deafness in Three Movements by Irene Taylor Brodsky
- One Child Nation by Nanfu Wang and Jialing Zhang
- Pahokee by Ivete Lucas and Patrick Bresnan
- TIGERLAND by Ross Kauffman
- Untitled Amazing Johnathan Documentary by Ben Berman
- Where’s My Roy Cohn? by Matt Tyrnauer

=== World Cinema Dramatic Competition ===
- Dirty God by Sacha Polak
- Divine Love by Gabriel Mascaro
- Dolce Fine Giornata by Jacek Borcuch
- Judy and Punch by Mirrah Foulkes
- Koko-di Koko-da by Johannes Nyholm
- The Last Tree by Shola Amoo
- Monos by Alejandro Landes
- Queen of Hearts by May el-Toukhy
- The Sharks by Lucía Garibaldi
- The Souvenir by Joanna Hogg
- This is not Berlin by Hari Sama
- We Are Little Zombies by Makoto Nagahisa

=== World Cinema Documentary Competition ===
- Advocate by Rachel Leah Jones and Philippe Bellaïche
- Cold Case Hammarskjöld by Mads Brügger
- The Edge of Democracy by Petra Costa
- The Disappearance of My Mother by Beniamino Barrese
- Gaza by Garry Keane and Andrew McConnell
- Honeyland by Ljubomir Stefanov and Tamara Kotevska
- Lapü by Juan Pablo Polanco and César Alejandro Jaimes
- The Magic Life of V by Tonislav Hristov
- Midnight Traveler by Hassan Fazili
- Sea of Shadows by Richard Ladkani
- Shooting the Mafia by Kim Longinotto
- Stieg Larsson – The Man Who Played With Fire by Henrik Georgsson

=== Premieres ===
- After the Wedding by Bart Freundlich
- Animals by Sophie Hyde
- Blinded by the Light by Gurinder Chadha
- Extremely Wicked, Shockingly Evil and Vile by Joe Berlinger
- Fighting with My Family by Stephen Merchant
- I Am Mother by Grant Sputore
- Late Night by Nisha Ganatra
- Mope by Lucas Heyne
- Official Secrets by Gavin Hood
- Paddleton by Alex Lehmann
- Photograph by Ritesh Batra
- Relive by Jacob Aaron Estes
- Sonja - The White Swan by Anne Sewitsky
- The Mustang by Laure de Clermont-Tonnerre
- The Boy Who Harnessed the Wind by Chiwetel Ejiofor
- The Report by Scott Z. Burns
- The Sunlit Night by David Wnendt
- The Tomorrow Man by Noble Jones
- Top End Wedding by Wayne Blair
- Troop Zero by Bert & Bertie
- Velvet Buzzsaw by Dan Gilroy

=== Midnight ===
- Corporate Animals by Patrick Brice
- Greener Grass by Jocelyn DeBoer & Dawn Luebbe
- Little Monsters by Abe Forsythe
- Memory: The Origins of Alien by Alexandre O. Philippe
- Mope by Lucas Heyne
- Sweetheart by J. D. Dillard
- The Hole in the Ground by Lee Cronin
- The Lodge by Veronika Franz and Severin Fiala
- Wounds by Babak Anvari

=== Documentary Premieres ===
- Ask Dr. Ruth by Ryan White
- Halston by Frédéric Tcheng
- Love, Antosha by Garret Price
- Marianne & Leonard: Words of Love by Nick Broomfield
- MERATA: How Mum Decolonised The Screen by Heperi Mita
- Miles Davis: Birth of the Cool by Stanley Nelson
- Raise Hell: The Life & Times of Molly Ivins by Janice Engel
- The Brink by Alison Klayman
- The Great Hack by Karim Amer and Jehane Noujaim
- The Inventor: Out for Blood in Silicon Valley by Alex Gibney
- Toni Morrison: The Pieces I Am by Timothy Greenfield-Sanders
- Untouchable by Ursula Macfarlane
- Words from a Bear by Jeffrey Palmer

=== Special Events ===
- Documentary Now! Original Cast Album: Co-Op by Alex Buono
- Documentary Now! Season 52 Preview
- Documentary Now! Waiting for the Artist by Alex Buono and Rhys Thomas
- Leaving Neverland by Dan Reed
- Lorena by Joshua Rofe
- Now Apocalypse by Gregg Araki
- Pop-Up Magazine
- This Is Personal by Amy Berg

=== Next ===
The following 10 films were selected for a world premiere in the Next program to highlight American cinema.

- Adam by Rhys Ernst
- Give Me Liberty by Kirill Mikhanovsky
- Light from Light by Paul Harrill
- Paradise Hills by Alice Waddington
- Premature by Rashaad Ernesto Green
- Selah and the Spades by Tayarisha Poe
- Sister Aimee by Samantha Buck and Marie Schlingmann
- The Death of Dick Long by Daniel Scheinert
- The Infiltrators by Alex Rivera, Cristina Ibarra
- The Wolf Hour by Alistair Banks Griffin

== Awards ==
The winner of the U.S. Grand Jury Prize: Dramatic Award was Clemency (2019), directed by Chinonye Chukwu.

The winner of the U.S. Grand Jury Prize: Documentary Award was One Child Nation (2019), directed by Nanfu Wang and Jialing Zhang.

The winner of the World Cinema Grand Jury Prize: Dramatic was The Souvenir (2019), directed by Joanna Hogg.

The winner of the World Cinema Grand Jury Prize: Documentary was Honeyland (2019), directed by Tamara Kotevska and Ljubomir Stefanov.

The winner of the World Cinema Dramatic Special Jury Award was Monos (2019) directed by Alejandro Landes.

== Juries ==
Jury members for each program of the festival, including the Alfred P. Sloan Jury, were announced on January 17, 2019.

U.S. Documentary Jury

- Lucien Castaing-Taylor
- Yance Ford
- Rachel Grady
- Jeff Orlowski
- Alissa Wilkinson

U.S. Dramatic Jury

- Desiree Akhavan
- Damien Chazelle
- Dennis Lim
- Phyllis Nagy
- Tessa Thompson

World Documentary Jury

- Carl Spence
- Marina Stavenhagen
- Lynette Wallworth

World Dramatic Jury

- Jane Campion
- Charles Gillibert
- Ciro Guerra

World Cinema Documentary Jury

- Maite Alberdi
- Nico Marzano
- Verena Paravel

Alfred P. Sloan Jury

- Mandë Holdford
- Katie Mack
- Sev Ohanian
- Lydia Dean Pilcher
- Corey Stoll

Short Film Jury

- Young Jean Lee
- Carter Smith
- Sheila Vand

== Acquisitions ==
Sources:

- American Factory: Netflix
- Anthropocene: The Human Epoch: Kino Lorber
- Ask Dr. Ruth: Hulu
- Blinded by the Light: New Line Cinema/Warner Bros. Pictures (select territories)
- The Brink: Magnolia Pictures
- Brittany Runs a Marathon: Amazon Studios
- David Crosby: Remember My Name: Sony Pictures Classics
- Delhi Crime Story: Netflix
- The Dispossessed: New York Times Op-Docs
- The Farewell: A24
- Hala: Apple TV+
- Halston: 1091 Media
- Honey Boy: Amazon Studios
- Honeyland: Neon
- Late Night: Amazon Studios
- Lavender: Fox Searchlight Pictures
- Little Monsters: Neon and Hulu
- The Lodge: Neon
- Luce: Neon and Topic Studios
- Marianne & Leonard: Words of Love: Roadside Attractions
- Merata: How Mum Decolonised the Screen: ARRAY
- Monos: Neon
- The Mountain: Kino Lorber
- Native Son: HBO Films
- The Nightingale: IFC Films (US distribution); Transmission Films (Australia distribution)
- Official Secrets: IFC Films
- One Child Nation: Amazon Studios
- Quarter Life Poetry: FX
- The Report: Amazon Studios
- Sea of Shadows: National Geographic Documentary Films
- Share: HBO Films (in association with A24)
- Shooting the Mafia: Cohen Media Group
- The Souvenir: A24
- Them That Follow: 1091 Media
- The Tomorrow Man: Bleecker Street (US distribution); Sony Pictures Worldwide Acquisitions (international distribution)
- Them That Follow: 1091 Media
- Where’s My Roy Cohn?: Sony Pictures Classics
- Wu-Tang Clan: Of Mics and Men: Showtime
