= Kelvin Harrison Jr. =

American actor (born 1994)

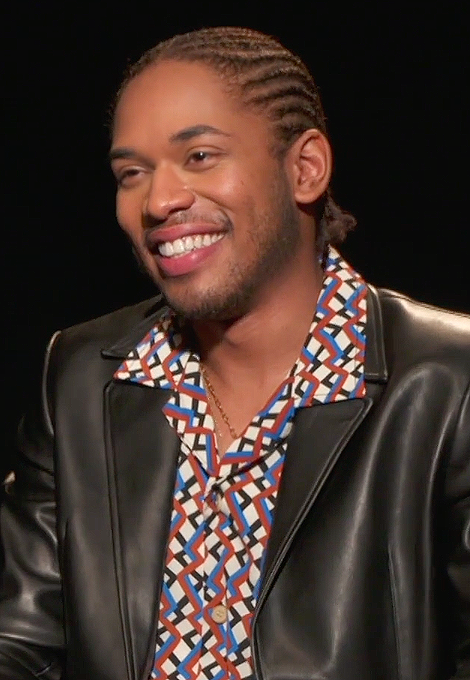
- Harrison in 2021
- Born: July 23, 1994 (age 32); New Orleans, Louisiana, U.S.
- Occupation: Actor
- Years active: 2012–present

Kelvin Harrison Jr. (born July 23, 1994) is an American actor. His career began with small roles in the 2013 films Ender's Game and 12 Years a Slave. He gained wider recognition for his performance as Travis in the horror film It Comes at Night (2017). Harrison appeared in the 2019 films Luce and Waves, as well as The High Note (2020), The Trial of the Chicago 7 (2020), Cyrano (2021) and Elvis (2022). He later starred in the 2022 film Chevalier. His accolades include a Screen Actors Guild Award, along with nominations for a British Academy Film Award, Gotham Award, an Independent Spirit Award.

== Early life and education ==
Harrison was born on July 23, 1994, in New Orleans, Louisiana, to musicians Shirlita and Kelvin Harrison. He grew up in the Garden District and later moved to The Westbank. He studied studio engineering and marketing, before moving to Los Angeles, California to pursue acting, where he began taking acting classes. He is also a skilled musician, mainly playing jazz and gospel on the piano, trumpet, as well as singing. His father was trained by Ellis Marsalis and grew up with Harry Connick Jr. Harrison studied under Jason Marsalis, recorded with Delfeayo Marsalis, and met Wynton Marsalis.

Harrison attended Isidore Newman School, where he was one of the few black students in his class and struggled to fit in. He originally went to Loyola University New Orleans to major in studio engineering as his father felt he would excel in music. Harrison ultimately transferred to the University of New Orleans for film, with the goal of writing and directing his own films.

== Career ==
In 2012, Harrison was cast in Ender's Game, based on the 1985 novel. He was upgraded to day-player and interacted with actors such as Viola Davis, Harrison Ford, and Ben Kingsley. Harrison credits Davis with making him take acting more seriously. He then had a small role in 12 Years a Slave. Harrison would later appear in an episode of WGN America's Underground and the 2016 remake of Roots, both of which were produced in his home state of Louisiana. That same year, the actor had a small role in Nate Parker's The Birth of a Nation. Harrison was initially hesitant to participate in Roots, in part because it would be his fourth portrayal of a slave, and he did not have fond memories of watching the original as a child. In retrospect, Harrison realized just how different the projects were. In the meantime, Harrison landed a supporting role on Fox miniseries Shots Fired as well as a recurring role as Touie Dacey on Crackle's StartUp

Harrison began the year with a small supporting role in the Netflix acquired Dee Rees' Mudbound, which opened at the Sundance Film Festival to critical acclaim. Later that year, he played the role of Travis in Trey Edward Shults' 2017 psychological horror film It Comes at Night. The film focuses on a family hiding in a forest as the Earth is taken over by a highly contagious disease. The film had its premiere at the Overlook Film Festival at Timberline Lodge in Oregon on April 29, 2017 and was theatrically released on June 9, 2017 in the United States by A24, was received positively by critics and grossed over $19 million worldwide. Harrison received praise for his performance, getting nominated for Breakthrough Actor at the Gotham Awards that year. He has credited the role for giving him a reason to continue his acting career.

In 2018, Harrison notably starred in three films that premiered at the Sundance Film Festival, which were Monsters and Men, Assassination Nation & Monster. In Reinaldo Marcus Green's Monsters and Men, he portrays Zyrick, a gifted teenage baseball player that becomes politically awakened after seeing a video of a man murdered by the police. In Sam Levinson's Assassination Nation he has a smaller role as Mason, a friend of the female protagonists and in Anthony Mandler's Monster, based on the Walter Dean Myers novel of the same name, Harrison plays Steve Harmon, a seventeen-year-old honour student whose world comes crashing down around him when he is charged with felony murder. Assassination Nation and Monsters and Men both got releases in the same year while Monster acquired a distribution deal with Netflix in 2021. He followed these up with supporting roles in the dramas Jinn and JT LeRoy.

2019 saw Harrison starring in two films that premiered at the Sundance Film Festival, social thriller Luce and psychological thriller The Wolf Hour, both starring Naomi Watts. For his titular role in Julius Onah's Luce alongside Octavia Spencer and Tim Roth, Harrison received critical acclaim as the all-star high school athlete and accomplished public speaker born in war-torn Eritrea adopted in the United States. Justin Chang of the Los Angeles Times wrote, "Harrison's performance, at once slippery and surgically precise, compounds that ambiguity in ingenious fashion. He exhibits a quality that might have seemed like mere self-consciousness in a different actor's hands. Harrison was nominated for Best Male Lead at the Independent Spirit Awards for his performance in the film.

Harrison later played Jesse in Nabil Elderkin's directorial debut Gully. The film had its world premiere at the Tribeca Film Festival on April 27, 2019 and eventually found a national theatrical release on June 4, 2021. Harrison's major breakthrough of the year came with Waves, which premiered to critical acclaim at the Telluride Film Festival on August 30, 2019 and found him reuniting with It Comes at Night writer & director Trey Edward Shults. In the film, Harrison plays Tyler Williams, a popular high school senior and competitive wrestler whose life goes into disarray after suffering a career-ending injury. Shults stated that he wrote and tailored the role for Harrison, wanting to work with him again after their previous collaboration. Harrison's performance in the film received rave reviews, with many critics favorably comparing and contrasting it to his performance in Luce. IndieWire's Eric Kohn stated that the two performances pushed him forward as 'the preeminent face of disgruntled teenage life'. The film is notable for widening his international exposure, leading to a BAFTA Rising Star Award nomination. He capped off the year with a supporting performance as musician Teddy Greene in the first season of Epix's Godfather of Harlem alongside Forest Whitaker.

The first half of 2020 saw Harrison venturing into more lighthearted and comedic roles, ranging from his studio debut in a smaller supporting role in Stella Meghie's romance film The Photograph to the male lead in Nisha Ganatra's musical comedy-drama The High Note. In the latter Harrison plays David Cliff, a singer-songwriter who acts as the love interest to Dakota Johnson's Maggie. To prepare for the film and its soundtrack, Harrison worked with a vocal coach for 45 minutes a day, to expand his range, and took guitar lessons. He ended the year with a portrayal of revolutionary socialist Fred Hampton in Aaron Sorkin's biographical ensemble courtroom drama The Trial of the Chicago 7, It was released in selected theaters on September 25, 2020, and began streaming digitally on Netflix on October 16. The film was nominated for six Academy Awards and Harrison and the rest of the cast won the Screen Actors Guild Award for Outstanding Performance by a Cast in a Motion Picture.

In 2021, Harrison portrayed Christian in Joe Wright's Cyrano, a musical film adaptation of the Off-Broadway play by Erica Schmidt, itself based on the 1897 Edmond Rostand play Cyrano de Bergerac. Harrison was slated to appear in the second season of HBO's Euphoria, which would have reunited him with Assassination Nation director Sam Levinson, but dropped out due to conflicting schedules attributed to the COVID-19 pandemic.

Harrison portrayed the legendary blues guitarist B. B. King in Baz Luhrmann's 2022 biopic Elvis, which was not only a critical success, but also known for being a film about rock and roll icon Elvis Presley. He then starred in the 2022 film Chevalier, directed by Stephen Williams, in which he portrayed Joseph Bologne, Chevalier de Saint-Georges, the 18th-century Black French violin virtuoso and classical composer. In August 2021, it was announced that Harrison would star in Mufasa: The Lion King, Barry Jenkins's follow-up to The Lion King, as the voice of young Scar.

Upcoming projects

In January 2022, it was reported that Harrison will portray the artist Jean-Michel Basquiat in Samo Lives, a biopic that will reunite him with Luce director Julius Onah.

In May 2025, it was announced that Harrison will play a younger Beetee Latier in The Hunger Games: Sunrise on the Reaping, set to be released on November 20, 2026.

== Filmography ==
=== Film ===
Key
†	Denotes films that have not yet been released

Year	Title	Role	Notes
2013	12 Years a Slave	Victim 2	
2013	Ender's Game	Salamandar	Uncredited
2014	Deluge	Kareem	Short film
2014	The Flight of the Bumblebee	James	Short film
2015	A Sort of Homecoming	Eliot	
2015	Dancer and the Dame	Kenny Basset	
2016	The Birth of a Nation	Simon	
2017	Mudbound	Weeks	
2017	It Comes at Night	Travis	
2018	Monsters and Men	Zyrick ("Zee")	
2018	Assassination Nation	Mason	
2018	Monster	Steve Harmon	
2018	Jinn	Tahir	
2018	JT LeRoy	Sean	
2019	Luce	Luce Edgar	
2019	The Wolf Hour	Freddie	
2019	Gully	Jesse	
2019	Bolden	Frankie Duson	
2019	Waves	Tyler Williams	
2020	The Photograph	Andy Morrison	
2020	The High Note	David Cliff	
2020	The Trial of the Chicago 7	Fred Hampton	
2021	Cyrano	Christian	
2022	Elvis	B.B. King	
2022	Chevalier	Joseph Bologne, Chevalier de Saint-Georges	
2024	Mufasa: The Lion King	Adult Taka/Scar (voice)	
2024	Golden	—N/a	Unreleased
2025	O'Dessa	Euri Dervish	
2026	Alpha Gang	Alpha Three	
2026	The Hunger Games: Sunrise on the Reaping	Beetee Latier	
TBA	Samo Lives †	Jean-Michel Basquiat	Post-production

=== Television ===
Year	Title	Role	Notes
2015	Into the Badlands	Jolyon	Episode: "Chapter V: Snake Creeps Down"
2016	Underground	Teenage Runaway	Episode: "The White Whale"
2016	Chicago P.D.	Michael Ellis	Episode: "Justice"
2016	Roots	Winslow	Episode: "Part 4"
2016	Shots Fired	Joey Campbell	3 episodes
2016–2017	StartUp	Touie Dacey	12 episodes
2017	NCIS: New Orleans	Cadet Lieutenant Commander Max Cabral	Episode: "The Last Stand"
2019	Godfather of Harlem	Teddy Greene	Main role (season 1)
2024	Genius	Martin Luther King Jr.	Main role (season 4)

=== Music video ===
Year	Title	Role	Notes
2016	"One Bad Night"	Main character	by Hayley Kiyoko

== Awards and nominations ==
Year	Award	Category	Work	Result
2017	Gotham Independent Film Award	Breakthrough Actor	It Comes at Night	Nominated
2019	Hollywood Critics Association Film Awards	Best Breakthrough Performance	Waves	Won
2019	British Academy Film Awards	Rising Star Award	Waves	Nominated
2019	Independent Spirit Awards	Best Male Lead	Luce	Nominated
2021	Screen Actors Guild Awards	Outstanding Performance by a Cast in a Motion Picture	The Trial of the Chicago 7	Won
