= Luce (film) =

2019 film

- Theatrical release poster
- Directed by: Julius Onah
- Screenplay by: JC Lee; Julius Onah
- Based on: Luce by JC Lee
- Produced by: John Baker; Julius Onah; Andrew Yang
- Starring: Naomi Watts; Octavia Spencer; Kelvin Harrison Jr.; Norbert Leo Butz; Tim Roth
- Cinematography: Larkin Seiple
- Edited by: Madeleine Gavin
- Music by: Geoff Barrow; Ben Salisbury
- Production companies: Dream Factory Group; Altona Filmhaus; New Tropics
- Distributed by: Neon; Topic
- Release dates: January 27, 2019 (Sundance); August 2, 2019 (United States)
- Running time: 109 minutes
- Country: United States
- Language: English
- Box office: $2.3 million

Luce is a 2019 American social thriller drama film co-produced and directed by Julius Onah, who co-wrote the screenplay with JC Lee, based on the 2013 play by Lee. It stars Naomi Watts, Octavia Spencer, Kelvin Harrison Jr., and Tim Roth. The film tells the story of a couple (Watts and Roth) forced to reconsider their marriage and their family after an extremely disturbing essay written by their adopted son (Harrison Jr.) is brought to their attention by his teacher (Spencer).

Principal photography took place in Roosevelt, New York and Los Angeles, California and the film was shot on 35mm film.

Luce had its premiere at the Sundance Film Festival on January 27, 2019, and was released in the United States on August 2, by Neon. It received positive reviews from critics, who praised the cast's performances, Onah's direction, the writing, and the film's themes. The film made over $2.3 million worldwide.

The film received multiple nominations from the various award organizations including the Black Reel Awards and various critics organizations, including the Hollywood Critics Association and the San Diego Film Critics Society Awards.

== Plot ==
Born in war-torn Eritrea and adopted in the United States by a progressive White family, Luce Edgar is an all-star high school athlete and accomplished public speaker who is adored by other students and his adoptive parents, Peter and Amy. However, he has animosity towards his history teacher, Harriet Wilson, who got his friend DeShaun kicked off the running team after finding marijuana in his locker.

Amy meets with Harriet, who shows her Luce has written a paper about political revolutionary Frantz Fanon, arguing that colonialism can be overcome through violence. Harriet is concerned. Harriet also reveals to Amy that she found a bag of illegal fireworks in Luce's locker.

Amy and Peter decide to not say anything to Luce, hiding the paper and fireworks. When asked about his teacher, Luce accuses Harriet of harmfully singling out students, such as using Stephanie Kim, a Korean-American classmate had been sexually assaulted by Luce's friends and teammates, at the time she was also dating Luce, as an example of a victim suffering in silence. Luce is Harriet's shining example of a star Black student, but he argues that he does not want to be tokenized. Luce finds the hidden paper and fireworks.

Luce and Harriet discuss his paper to which he says he simply followed the prompt of the assignment, disavowing any true belief in violence. He makes a comment about fireworks that Harriet interprets as a threat, and she notifies Peter. He and Amy confront Luce. He explains that the track team shares lockers and the fireworks are not his. Peter thinks Luce is lying, but Amy is not sure and tries to maintain peace.

Harriet and her sister Rosemary, who suffers from an unspecified mental illness, have an encounter with Luce at a supermarket that unsettles Harriet.

Luce and Deshaun engage in an argument regarding Deshaun's removal from the running team, resulting in a loss of potential scholarships. Deshaun criticizes Luce for the privileges he receives as being exalted as a star student, which Luce argues he does not want nor asked for. He promises DeShaun that he will make things right. Meanwhile, Amy and Stephanie meet at a coffee shop. Stephanie says that she used to date Luce, which Amy never knew, but they broke up. Stephanie describes being sexually assaulted at a party by several boys while under the influence of alcohol. Luce stopped them and comforted her after she awoke. Luce later learns from Stephanie about the visit.

Rosemary arrives at the school looking for Harriet and has a breakdown, stripping naked in front of a crowd of students before she is tasered and apprehended by police. The incident is recorded and posted on social media. Harriet's home is vandalized with racial slurs later that night, and Stephanie arrives shortly after to tell Harriet that Luce sexually assaulted her. Harriet informs Principal Towson, and a meeting is organized with Luce and his parents. Luce disproves Harriet's accusations with video evidence of his whereabouts, and Harriet's harsh questions quickly make Amy and Peter come to his defense. Harriet discovers that Stephanie has left before she could repeat her accusation to Towson. Towson lets Luce go, despite Harriet still arguing her side.

At night, exploding fireworks inside Harriet's desk cause a fire. Towson puts Harriet on a leave of absence pending investigation. Learning of the incident, Amy discovers that the fireworks in their home are gone. Peter believes Luce was involved, but Amy insists that they have to protect their son.

Luce turns up at Harriet's home with flowers, saying he feels uncomfortable about her losing her job. However, he contradicts this by confronting her about ruining DeShaun's athletic career and putting Luce on a pedestal. She accuses Luce of being hypocritical, protecting himself by using other minority students, including Stephanie, to "run his errands" of subterfuge against her. Luce argues "that is not the same thing".

Amy follows Luce to a hideout where he has sex with Stephanie. When Amy returns home, Luce arrives and reconciles with her. Later, Luce gives a speech at school, thanking Amy and Peter for raising him and saying how lucky he feels to be an American, with the chance to start over and tell his own story. Afterwards, Luce goes on a jog, visibly upset.

== Cast ==
- Naomi Watts as Amy Edgar
- Octavia Spencer as Harriet Wilson
- Kelvin Harrison Jr. as Luce Edgar
- Norbert Leo Butz as Principal Dan
- Andrea Bang as Stephanie Kim
- Marsha Stephanie Blake as Rosemary
- Tim Roth as Peter Edgar
- Astro as Deshaun Meeks
- Omar Brunson as Corey Johnson
- Noah Gaynor as Kenny Orlicki
- Christopher Mann as Coach Reeves
- Amanda Troya as Kelly Martinez

== Production ==
In November 2017, it was announced Naomi Watts, Octavia Spencer, Kelvin Harrison Jr., and Tim Roth had joined the cast of the film, with Julius Onah directing from a screenplay by himself and JC Lee. John Baker, Onah, and Andrew Yang served as producers on the film with Rob Feng, Amber Wang, and Lee served as executive producers under their Dream Factory Group banner. In December 2017, Brian Bradley, also known as Stro, joined the cast of the film. Onah spoke about the importance of rehearsal with actors to his process. The actors rehearsed with each other before filming to create deeper familiarity, this includes a rehearsal in which all the young actors joined up in New York to hang out and develop a deeper backstory and understanding of their characters. The film was shot on 35mm film.

== Release ==
The film had its world premiere at the Sundance Film Festival on January 27, 2019. Shortly after, NEON & Topic Studios acquired distribution rights to the film. It was released on August 2, 2019, and came out on VOD by Universal Home Entertainment on October 29, 2019.

== Reception ==
=== Box office ===
Luce grossed $2 million in the United States and Canada, and $0.3 million in other territories, for a worldwide total of $2.3 million, plus $76,183 with home video sales.

=== Critical response ===
On the review aggregator website Rotten Tomatoes, 91% of 171 critics' reviews are positive, with an average rating of 7.8/10. The website's consensus reads: "Luce brings a stellar ensemble to bear on a satisfyingly complex story that addresses its timely themes in thought-provoking fashion." Metacritic, which uses a weighted average, assigned the film a score of 72 out of 100, based on 31 critics, indicating "generally favorable" reviews.

The Guardian's Benjamin Lee said of Kelvin Harrison Jr.'s performance, "It's an utterly mesmeric turn, filled with crushing vulnerability and insidious menace, in a brutal, dramatically explosive film that challenges preconceptions and leaves us with difficult, troubling questions to consider." Critic Brian Tallerico of RogerEbert.com praised the film, commenting, "It reminded me of early Mamet work although with a commentary on race he could never attempt. All of this, and it's got one of the best ensemble performances of Sundance 2019. This is one to watch for." He went on to specifically praise Harrison Jr.'s performance as "the real deal... flat out brilliant."

=== Accolades ===
Award	Date of ceremony	Category	Recipient(s)	Result	Ref.
Black Reel Awards	February 7, 2019	Outstanding Director	Julius Onah	Nominated	
Black Reel Awards	February 7, 2019	Outstanding Actor	Kelvin Harrison Jr.	Nominated	
Black Reel Awards	February 7, 2019	Outstanding Supporting Actress	Octavia Spencer	Nominated	
Black Reel Awards	February 7, 2019	Outstanding Screenplay	J.C. Lee and Julius Onah	Nominated	
Black Reel Awards	February 7, 2019	Outstanding Emerging Director	Julius Onah	Nominated	
Black Reel Awards	February 7, 2019	Outstanding Independent Feature	Julius Onah, John Baker and Andrew Yang	Nominated	
Central Ohio Film Critics Association	December 14, 2019	Actor of the Year	Kelvin Harrison Jr.	Nominated	
Chicago Independent Film Critics Circle Awards	February 2, 2019	Best Supporting Actress	Octavia Spencer	Nominated	
Chicago Independent Film Critics Circle Awards	February 2, 2019	Best Adapted Screenplay	Julius Onah and J.C. Lee	Nominated	
Chlotrudis Awards	2020	Best Actor	Kelvin Harrison Jr.	Nominated	
Chlotrudis Awards	2020	Best Supporting Actress	Octavia Spencer	Nominated	
Chlotrudis Awards	2020	Best Adapted Screenplay	J.C. Lee and Julius Onah	Won	
Independent Spirit Awards	February 8, 2020	Best Director	Julius Onah	Nominated	
Independent Spirit Awards	February 8, 2020	Best Male Lead	Kelvin Harrison Jr.	Nominated	
Independent Spirit Awards	February 8, 2020	Best Supporting Female	Octavia Spencer	Nominated	
Georgia Film Critics Association	January 10, 2020	Breakthrough Award	Kelvin Harrison Jr.	Nominated	
Greater Western New York Film Critics Association Awards	2020	Best Picture	Luce	Nominated	
Greater Western New York Film Critics Association Awards	2020	Best Adapted Screenplay	J.C. Lee and Julius Onah	Nominated	
Hollywood Critics Association	January 9, 2020	Best Independent Film	Luce	Nominated	
NAACP Image Awards	February 22, 2020	Outstanding Supporting Actress in a Motion Picture	Octavia Spencer	Nominated	
International Online Cinema Awards	2020	Best Supporting Actress	Octavia Spencer	Nominated	
New York Film Critics, Online	December 7, 2019	Breakthrough Performance	Kelvin Harrison Jr.	Won	
Online Film & Television Association	February 2, 2020	Best Breakthrough Performance: Male	Kelvin Harrison Jr.	Nominated	
San Diego Film Critics Society Awards	December 9, 2019	Best Supporting Actress	Octavia Spencer	Nominated	
San Diego Film Critics Society Awards	December 9, 2019	Best Adapted Screenplay	J.C. Lee and Julius Onah	Won	
San Diego Film Critics Society Awards	December 9, 2019	Breakthrough Artist	Kelvin Harrison Jr.	Nominated	
Sundance Film Festival	February 1, 2020	U.S. Dramatic Competition Grand Jury Prize	Julius Onah	Nominated	

== See also ==
- List of black films of the 2010s
