= Julius Onah =

Nigerian-American filmmaker (born 1983)

- Born: February 10, 1983 (age 43); Makurdi, Benue State, Nigeria
- Education: Wesleyan University (BA); New York University (MFA)
- Occupation: Filmmaker
- Years active: 2002–present
- Website: opencontinents.com

Julius Onah (born February 10, 1983) is a Nigerian-American filmmaker. He has directed the films The Girl Is in Trouble (2015), The Cloverfield Paradox (2018), Luce (2019), and Captain America: Brave New World (2025).

== Early life ==
Onah was born in Makurdi, Benue State, Nigeria. His father, Adoga Onah, was a Nigerian diplomat. He was raised in the Philippines, Nigeria, Togo, and the United Kingdom before moving to Arlington County, Virginia. Onah graduated from Washington-Lee High School in Arlington and received his B.A. in theater from Wesleyan University in Middletown, Connecticut. He completed an M.F.A. from the graduate film program at the Tisch School of the Arts at New York University, where he was selected as a Dean's Fellow. He is also a recipient of the prestigious Jack Kent Cooke Foundation Scholarship.

== Career ==
Onah's work has been screened at festivals around the world including Sundance, Berlin, Tribeca, London, Dubai, Los Angeles, Melbourne and Camerimage. In the summer of 2010, he was selected as one of Filmmaker magazine's New Faces of Independent Film. In 2013, he was selected as one of Studio System's 10 Up and Up Feature Directors and Forbes magazine's 13 African Celebrities To Watch. While at NYU's graduate film program he completed his first feature as his thesis, The Girl Is in Trouble (2015) with executive producer Spike Lee, featuring Alicja Bachleda, Wilmer Valderrama, Columbus Short, and Jesse Spencer. Onah was previously set to direct the thriller film adaptation Brilliance for Legendary Pictures which David Koepp scripted with Will Smith and Noomi Rapace to star as leads. He then directed The Cloverfield Paradox (2018) with producer J. J. Abrams. His film, Luce, featuring Naomi Watts, Octavia Spencer, Tim Roth and Kelvin Harrison Jr., premiered at the 2019 Sundance Film Festival. He and J.C. Lee wrote the screenplay of the thriller film Bad Genius, a remake of the 2017 Thai film of the same name. He then directed Captain America: Brave New World, the fourth Captain America film in the Marvel Cinematic Universe, with Anthony Mackie starring in the title role.

== Filmography ==
=== Film ===
Year	Film	Director	Writer	Producer	Editor
2015	The Girl Is in Trouble	Yes	Yes	Yes	No
2018	The Cloverfield Paradox	Yes	No	No	No
2019	Luce	Yes	Yes	Yes	No
2024	Bad Genius	No	Yes	No	No
2025	Captain America: Brave New World	Yes	Yes	No	No
TBA	Samo Lives	Yes	Yes	Yes	Yes

== Open Continents ==
Open Continents is a global media project comprising Onah's short, feature, music video and television work.

Continent	Title	Country	Subject	Year
EUROPE	SZMOLINSKY (Berlin Film Festival, SXSW Click, Melbourne Film Festival)	Germany	Euro Tales	2008
EUROPE	NIE PATRZ WSTECZ (London Film Festival, Camerimage Grand Jury Award)	Poland	Euro Tales	2008
EUROPE	DRIK NU AGNES	Denmark	Euro Tales	2011
AFRICA	GOODBYE CHICKEN, FAREWELL GOAT (Los Angeles Film Festival, Mill Valley Film Festival, True/False Film Festival)	Nigeria	African Days	2010
AFRICA	BIG MAN (Dubai Film Festival, New York Times, Los Angeles Film Festival)	Nigeria	African Days	2012
NORTH AMERICA	SHE WAITS IN THE RESTLESS HORIZON	USA	New York Streets	2005
NORTH AMERICA	LINUS (MTVu Film of the Week, 1st Place Calvin Klein Short Film Competition)	USA	New York Streets	2007
NORTH AMERICA	THE GIRL IS IN TROUBLE	USA	New York Streets	2015
NORTH AMERICA	MEDITATIONS/A LOVE STORY	USA	American Lives	2004
NORTH AMERICA	THE BOUNDARY (Amnesty International Movies That Matter, Best Director NBC Short Cuts, HBO)	USA	American Lives	2008
NORTH AMERICA	"BROKEN ARROWS" (Avicii)	USA	American Lives	2015
NORTH AMERICA	LUCE	USA	American Lives	2019
NORTH AMERICA	THE CLOVERFIELD PARADOX	USA	Hollywood Lights	2018
