= Phillip Youmans =

American filmmaker (born 2000)

- Born: February 18, 2000 (age 26); New Orleans, Louisiana, U.S.
- Education: New York University
- Occupation: Filmmaker
- Notable work: Burning Cane (2019)
- Website: phillipyoumans.com

Phillip Youmans (born February 18, 2000) is an American filmmaker. He is the first African-American director to win the Founders Prize at Tribeca Film Festival, which he received for his 2019 directorial debut, Burning Cane.

== Early life and education ==
Youmans was born and raised in New Orleans. He first became interested in film-making when he was 13. Youmans attended two high schools through a dual enrollment program: Benjamin Franklin High School and New Orleans Center for Creative Arts.

He completed his freshman year at New York University in May 2019. In October 2019 he stated he may drop out of the program to focus on his career.

== Career ==
Youmans wrote, shot, directed and edited his first feature-length film, Burning Cane, as a senior in high school, when he was 17. The film grew from a short film that Youmans wrote called The Glory. It tells the story of a woman (played by Karen Kaia Livers) in rural Louisiana and her relationships with her alcoholic son and a local preacher. It also stars and was co-produced by Wendell Pierce. Raised Baptist, Youmans stated that the goal of Burning Cane was to "touch on [] how rigid religious conviction can be within the rural South, especially under sort of rigid interpretation of Protestantism." Youmans financed the film with $2500 in personal savings, an Indiegogo campaign, and donations from friends and family.

Burning Cane won the Founders Prize and the prize for best cinematography in a U.S. narrative feature film at the 2019 Tribeca Film Festival. Youmans is the first African-American director to receive the Founders Prize, he is also the youngest director to have a film accepted to the Tribeca Film Festival.

Youmans announced that he is currently developing his next feature film, which will focus on "the Black Panther chapter in New Orleans during 1978."

== Awards and nominations ==
Year	Award	Category	Nominated work	Result
2019	American Film Festival	Best Narrative Feature	Burning Cane	Nominated
2019	Tribeca Film Festival	Best Cinematography	Burning Cane	Won
2019	Tribeca Film Festival	Founders Prize	Burning Cane	Won
2020	Black Reel Awards	Outstanding First Screenplay	Burning Cane	Nominated
2020	Black Reel Awards	Outstanding Independent Feature	Burning Cane	Nominated
2020	Independent Spirit Awards	John Cassavetes Award	Burning Cane	Nominated
2020	Gotham Awards	Bingham Ray Breakthrough Director Award	Burning Cane	Nominated
2020	Gotham Awards	Audience Award	Burning Cane	Nominated
