= List of awards and nominations received by Darren Aronofsky =

Darren Aronofsky awards and nominations
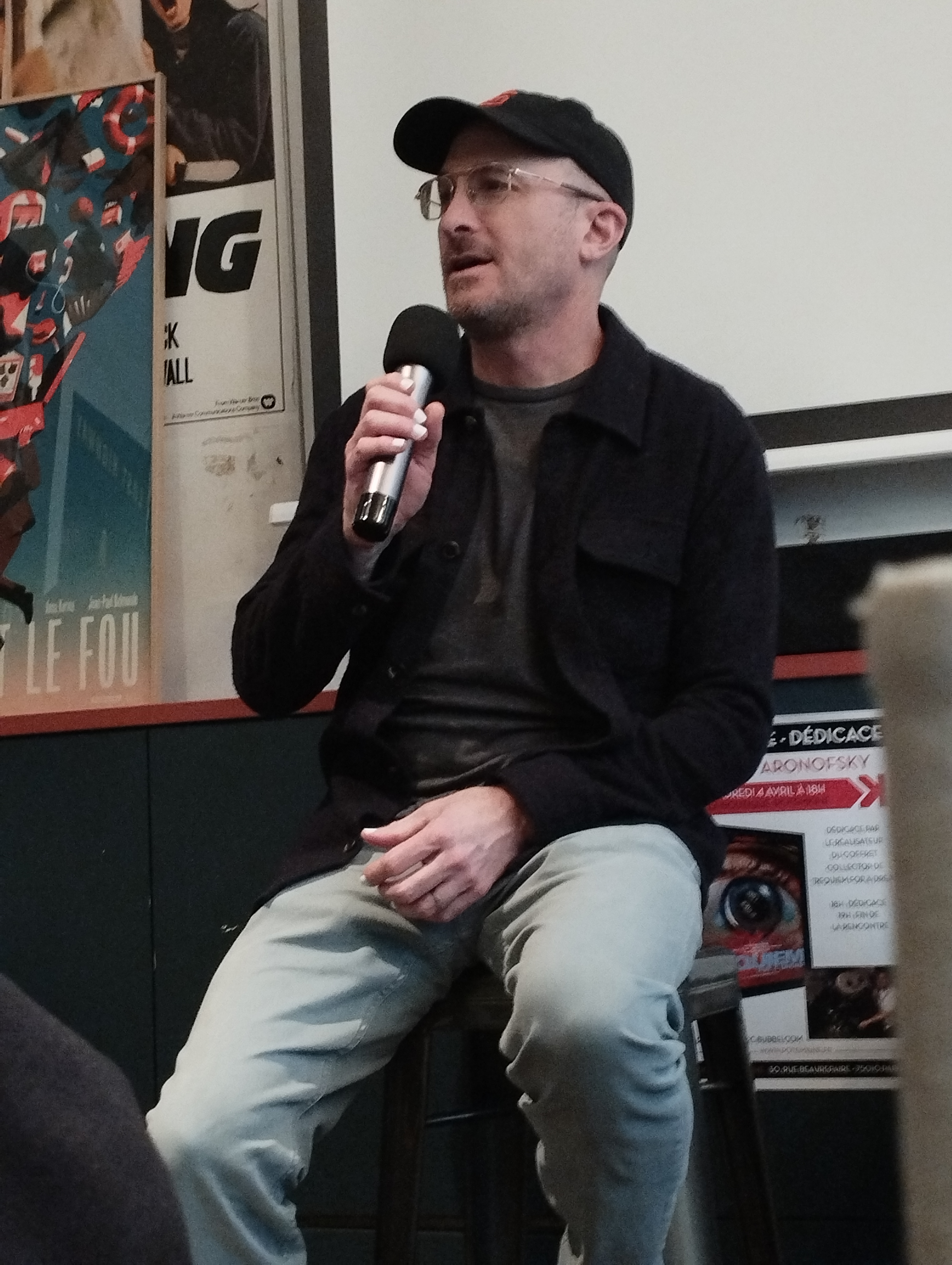
- Aronofsky in 2025
Awards and nominations
Award	Wins	Nominations
Academy Awards	0	1
BAFTA Awards	0	1
Critics' Choice	0	1
Emmy Awards	1	1
Golden Globes	0	1
Indie Spirits	3	6

Totals (Note: Certain award groups do not simply award one winner. They acknowledge several different recipients, have runners-up, and have third place. Since this is a specific recognition and is different from losing an award, runner-up mentions are considered wins in this award tally. For simplification and to avoid errors, each award in this list has been presumed to have had a prior nomination.)
- Wins: 37
- Nominations: 43

Darren Aronofsky is an American filmmaker known for directing several psychological thrillers and dramatic works. He has received several awards including a Primetime Emmy Award, three Independent Spirit Awards and the Golden Lion from the Venice International Film Festival as well as nominations for an Academy Award, a British Academy Film Award, a Critics' Choice Movie Award and a Golden Globe Award.

Aronofsky directed his feature film debut, the conceptual psychological thriller Pi (1998) for which he won the Directing Prize at the 1998 Sundance Film Festival, the Independent Spirit Award for Best First Screenplay and the Gotham Independent Film Award for Breakthrough Director. He earned acclaim for his psychological drama Requiem for a Dream (2000) earning a nomination for the Independent Spirit Award for Best Director.

For the sports drama The Wrestler (2008) he earned the Venice International Film Festival's Golden Lion and the Independent Spirit Award for Best Film. For the psychological horror film Black Swan (2010) he was nominated for the Academy Award for Best Director, BAFTA Award for Best Director, Directors Guild of America Award for Best Director, Critics' Choice Movie Award for Best Director and Golden Globe Award for Best Director. The film competed for the Golden Lion at the 67th Venice International Film Festival.

Aronofsky received positive reviews but controversy with the Biblical epic film Noah (2014). He then directed films which received polarized responses at the Venice International Film Festival, the psychological horror film Mother! (2017) and the psychological drama The Whale (2022) both of which competed for the Golden Lion at the 2017 ceremony and the 2022 ceremony respectively. For his work on television, he received the Primetime Emmy Award for Exceptional Merit in Documentary Filmmaking and the Peabody Award for the documentary film The Territory (2022).

== Major associations ==
=== Academy Awards ===
Year	Category	Nominated work	Result	Ref.
2010	Best Director	Black Swan	Nominated	

=== BAFTA Awards ===
Year	Category	Nominated work	Result	Ref.
British Academy Film Awards
2010	Best Direction	Black Swan	Nominated	

=== Critics' Choice Awards ===
Year	Category	Nominated work	Result	Ref.
Critics' Choice Movie Award
2010	Best Director	Black Swan	Nominated	

=== Emmy Awards ===
Year	Category	Nominated work	Result	Ref.
Primetime Emmy Awards
2023	Exceptional Merit in Documentary Filmmaking	The Territory	Won	

=== Golden Globe Awards ===
Year	Category	Nominated work	Result	Ref.
2010	Best Director	Black Swan	Nominated	

=== Independent Spirit Awards ===
Year	Category	Nominated work	Result	Ref.
1998	Best First Screenplay	Pi	Won	
1998	Best First Feature	Pi	Nominated	
2000	Best Director	Requiem for a Dream	Nominated	
2008	Best Film	The Wrestler	Won	
2010	Best Director	Black Swan	Won	
2016	Best Film	Jackie	Nominated	

=== Venice Film Festival ===
Year	Category	Nominated work	Result	Ref.
2006	Golden Lion	The Fountain	Nominated	
2008	Golden Lion	The Wrestler	Won	
2010	Golden Lion	Black Swan	Nominated	
2017	Golden Lion	Mother!	Nominated	
2022	Golden Lion	The Whale	Nominated	

== Miscellaneous awards ==
Year	Award	Category	Title	Result	Ref.
1998	Gotham Awards	Open Palm Award	Pi	Won	
1998	National Board of Review	Special Recognition for Excellence in Filmmaking	Pi	Won	
1998	Sundance Film Festival	Best Director	Pi	Won	
1998	Sundance Film Festival	Grand Jury Prize	Pi	Nominated	
2000	National Board of Review	Special Recognition for Excellence in Filmmaking	Requiem for a Dream	Won	
2000	Valladolid International Film Festival	Best Picture – Golden Spike Award	Requiem for a Dream	Won	
2001	Webby Award	Movie & Film Webby Award Winner	Requiem for a Dream	Won	
2001	American Film Institute	Franklin J. Schaffner Award Recipient		Won	
2006	Stockholm International Film Festival	Visionary Award	The Fountain	Won	
2006	Chicago International Film Festival	Emerging Visionary Award Recipient		Won	
2008	Golden Tomato	Best Drama	The Wrestler	Won	
2009	London Critics Circle Film Awards	Best Film	The Wrestler	Won	
2009	London Critics Circle Film Awards	Best Director	The Wrestler	Won	
2009	National Board of Review	Best Film	The Wrestler	Nominated	
2009	Fantasporto	Audience Award	The Wrestler	Won	
2010	Gotham Awards	Best Feature	Black Swan	Nominated	
2010	Chicago Film Critics Association	Best Director	Black Swan	Nominated	
2010	San Francisco Film Critics Circle Awards	Best Director	Black Swan	Won	
2010	Satellite Award	Best Director	Black Swan	Nominated	
2010	Toronto Film Critics Association	Best Director	Black Swan	Nominated	
2010	Vancouver Film Critics Circle	Best Director	Black Swan	Nominated	
2010	Washington D.C. Area Film Critics Association	Best Director	Black Swan	Nominated	
2010	Camerimage	Cinematographer – Director Duo Award	Black Swan	Won	
2011	Directors Guild of America	Outstanding Directing – Feature Film	Black Swan	Nominated	
2011	Provincetown International Film Festival	Filmmaker on the Edge Award Recipient	Black Swan	Won	
2011	Scream Awards	Best Director	Black Swan	Won	
2012	Japanese Academy Awards	Outstanding Foreign Language Film	Black Swan	Nominated	
2014	Woodstock Film Festival	Honorary Maverick Award Recipient		Won	
2015	Odesa International Film Festival	Golden Duke for Lifetime Achievement		Won	
2015	Motion Picture Sound Editors	Filmmaker's Award Recipient		Won	
2017	Deauville Film Festival	Achievement Tribute Award		Won	
2017	PETA Oscats	PETA Pick Award	Mother!	Won	
2018	Golden Raspberry Awards	Worst Director	Mother!	Nominated	
2018	Yerevan International Film Festival	Parajanov Thaler Award for Outstanding Artistic Contribution Into World Cinema		Won	
2018	Mumbai Film Festival	Excellence in Cinema Award		Won	
2022	Peabody Award	Entertainment	The Territory	Won	
