= Raviv Drucker =

Israeli journalist

Raviv Drucker רביב דרוקר
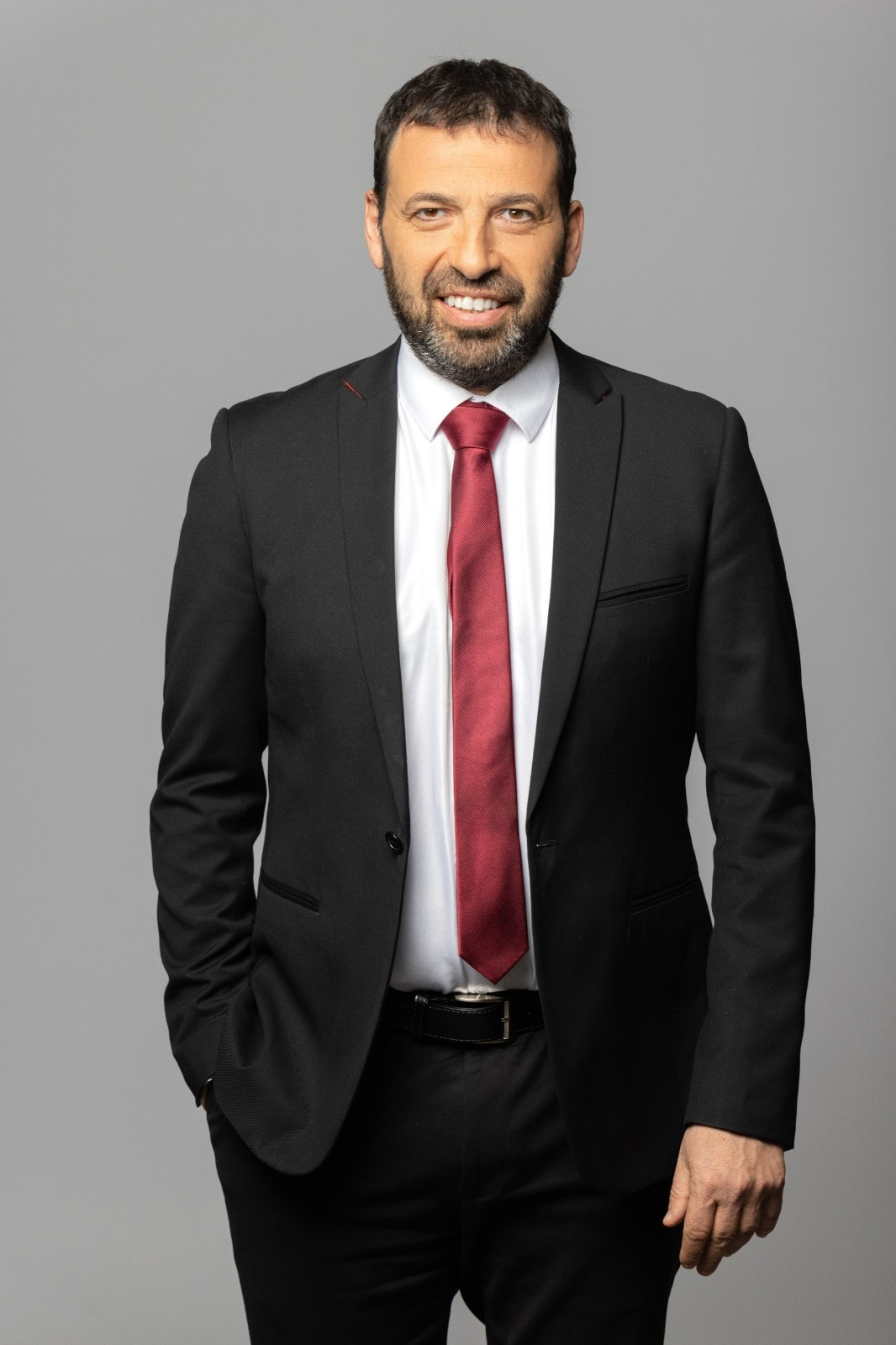
- Raviv Drucker in 2023
- Born: 11 September 1970 (age 56)
- Occupation: Journalism

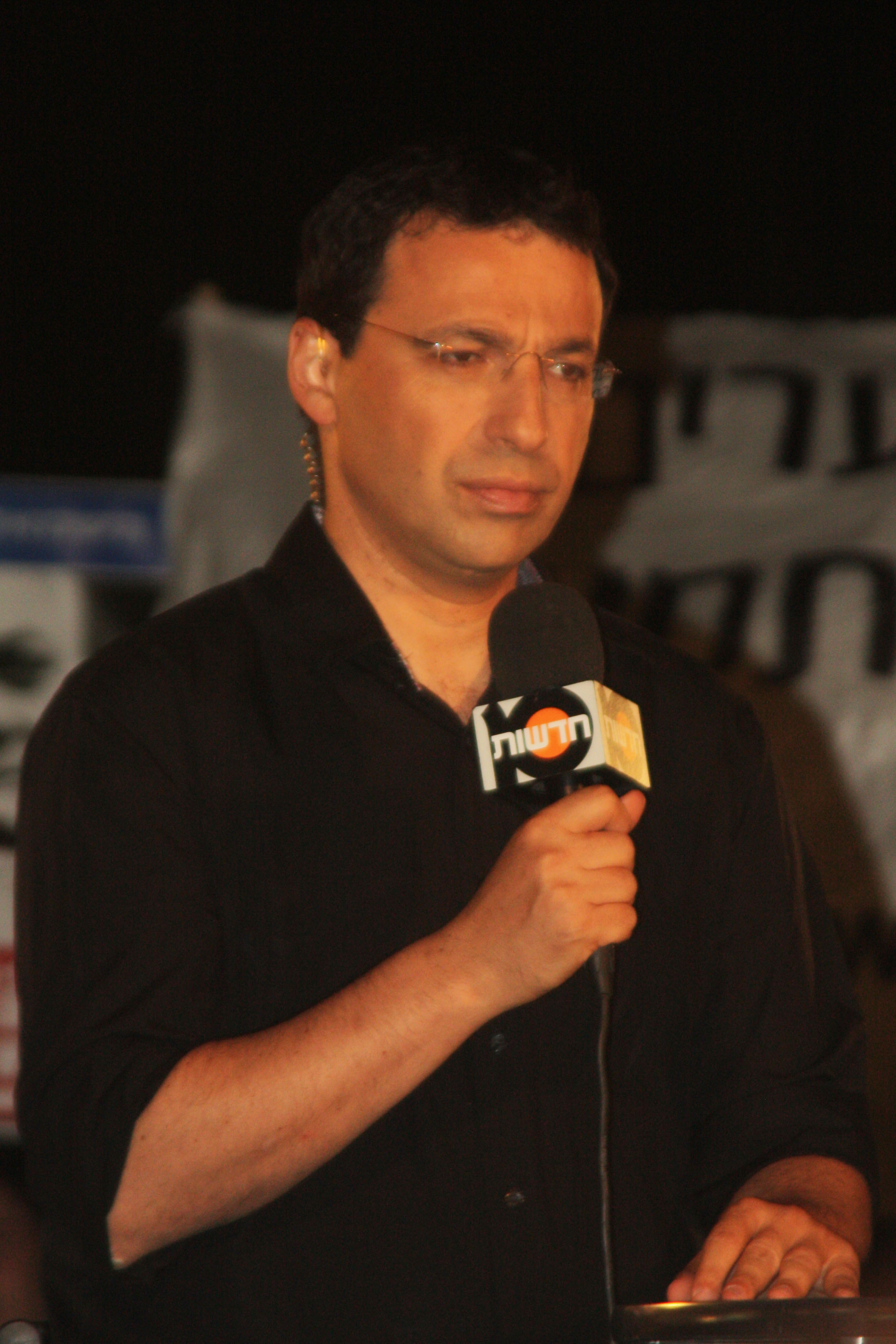
Raviv Drucker in 2011

Raviv Drucker (Hebrew: רביב דרוקר; born September 11, 1970) is an Israeli journalist, political commentator and investigative reporter.

== Journalistic career ==
=== Early years ===
Drucker began his journalistic career as a general reporter, and later on a real-estate and infrastructure reporter in Maariv newspaper. In 1997 he was promoted to be the newspaper's chief political reporter. In 1998 he became the political and diplomatic correspondent for Galei Tzahal (Israel's Army Radio), where he also occasionally hosted the daily "Ma Bo'er" (What's Hot) news broadcast.

In the 2002/3 academic year Drucker was a Nieman Fellow at Harvard University.

=== Channel 10 ===
After returning to Israel, Drucker became Channel 10's political commentator. He was later the co-presenter of the Channel's Friday evening news program together with Ofer Shelah. In 2009 he became the host of Hamakor ("the Source"), the Channel's investigative reporting magazine. He co-hosted the show together with Shelah, who was replaced by Mickey Rosenthal when Shelah decided to join politics. Rosenthal himself later joined Israeli politics and was replaced as Drucker's co-host by Razi Barkai. Both Shelah and Rosenthal were elected to the Knesset in the 2013 elections.

=== Select journalistic achievements ===
Drucker is responsible for unearthing several high-profile scandals in Israeli politics, that were a result of his investigations.

Three weeks before the 2006 elections, he exposed the "Omri Diary", the schedule of Omri Sharon, son of Israel's late Prime-Minister Ariel Sharon and a Knesset member himself. The papers detailed political appointments orchestrated by Sharon jr.

On June 15, 2007, three days after the primary elections for chairperson of the Israeli Labor Party, Drucker aired candid camera footage showing the faking of ballots results, a report which led to a police investigation.

Another police investigation was the result of his publication of leaked documents from Ehud Olmert's office as Israel's Prime Minister, documenting various promises to members of the Likud convention.

In 2008 Drucker published a series of reports on travels of Benjamin Netanyahu as a Knesset member, with his wife to London. According to the reports, these travels were paid for by private donors and included ostentatious accommodation, and were not properly approved of by the Knesset Ethics' committee. PM associates accused Drucker of applying a double standard, and the Netanyahus filed a libel suit against Drucker, which they later withdrew. The scandal is known in Israeli politics as "Bibi tours" (Bibi is the Nickname for Netanyahu). It was later reported that Netanyahu aides tied government willingness to postpone collection of Channel 10 debts to the state, which threatened its existence, to a demand to fire Drucker. In January 2015 Drucker published a draft of the State Comptroller's report on the matter, which according to the publication raises suspicion of compromised integrity.

In 2014 Drucker ran a series of investigative reports on the Jewish National Fund a non-profit organization owning 13% of total land in Israel, documenting questionable agreements with politicians and media outlets and politically motivated allocations of major sums to projects with allegedly little connection to the organization's declared goals.

=== Clash with Prime Minister Netanyahu ===
In October and November 2016 Drucker published a series of investigative reports related to Israel's PM, Benjamin Netanyahu. The one that drew the most attention argued that Netanyahu's personal lawyer and second cousin, David Shimron, represented a German submarine manufacturer in a multi-million dollar deal with Israel, alleging possible conflict of interest. Another report alleged that Netanyahu's son, Yair Netanyahu, received valuable gifts from Australian billionaire James Packer, and triggered a police investigation. Netanyahu responded with fierceful attacks on Drucker in his personal Facebook account, accusing him of "morbid and obsessive pursuit of the prime minister" and his family, and framing his channel 10 as "radical left-wing".

=== The Bibi Files ===
Drucker was a producer on the 2024 American documentary film The Bibi Files directed by Alexis Bloom. He also appeared in the film and spoke about his reporting relating to Netanyahu. Shortly before the film was screened at the Toronto International Film Festival lawyers representing Netanyahu petitioned the Jerusalem District Court for an injunction against Drucker for publishing footage from a police interrogation without the court's permission.

== Public activity ==
In 2004 Drucker founded the Movement for Freedom of Information in Israel. He served as its chairman through December 2016.

== Books ==
Drucker is the author of two books: Harakiri about the period of Ehud Barak's government, and Boomerang, which he wrote together with Ofer Shelah, about "the failure of Israeli leadership during the second Intifada".

== Awards ==
- 2008 OMETZ award (Citizens for Good Governance and Social Justice)
- 2011 Sokolov Award
- 2012 Transparency International (TI)(Israel) Award
- 2016 "Knight of Good Governance" Award (awarded to "The Movement for Freedom of Information" headed by Raviv Drucker"

== Education and personal life ==
Drucker holds a law degree from Tel Aviv University and studied Political Science at Bar-Ilan University. He was a basketball player and coach in the Israeli minor league. His brother, Sharon Drucker, is a professional basketball coach.

He lives with his partner, TV director Anat Goren, and their four sons in Tel Aviv-Yafo.
