= Txai Suruí =

Brazilian environmental activist

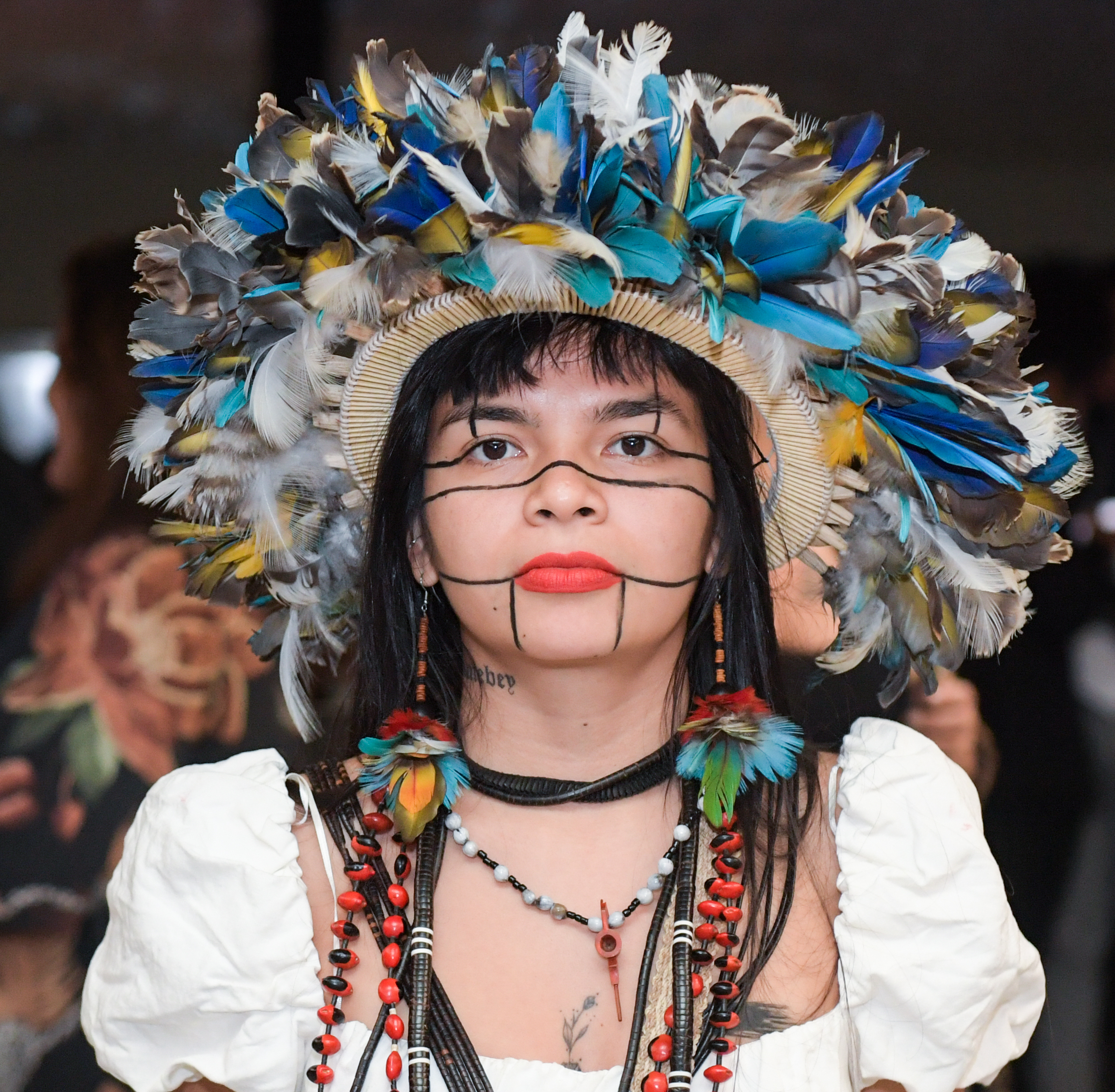
- Suruí in 2023
- Born: 1997 or 1998 (age 28–29); Rondônia, Brazil
- Occupation: Environmental activist
- Father: Almir Narayamoga Suruí
- Awards: Primetime Emmy Award

Txai Suruí is an indigenous Brazilian environmental activist. She has been called "the most well-known Brazilian environmental activist in the world". Suruí received a Primetime Emmy Award for Exceptional Merit in Documentary Filmmaking as executive producer of The Territory, a 2022 documentary about the Uru-Eu-Wau-Wau indigenous people in Brazil.

== Early life and education ==
Suruí was born in Rondônia, Brazil. Her father, Almir Narayamoga Suruí, is an activist, former parliamentary candidate, and member of the indigenous Paiter people of Brazil. Her mother, Ivaneide Bandeira Cardozo, is a scholar of indigenous people in Brazil, particularly the Uru-Eu-Wau-Wau. Suruí first attended school at the age of seven, when her family moved from an indigenous village to the nearby city. She spent much of her childhood living with her grandparents in Porto Velho. Suruí later studied law.

== Activism ==
In 2021, Suruí and three other activists from the environmental group Engajamundo, along with two activists from the international group Fridays for Future, sued officials in the Brazilian government for changing official carbon emissions calculations in order to circumvent Paris Agreement restrictions. Later that year, Suruí was selected to be a speaker at the annual United Nations Climate Change Conference, where she criticized attendees for their lack of attention to deforestation issues. The appearance significantly raised her international profile, leading Spanish newspaper El País to call Suruí "the most well-known Brazilian environmental activist in the world".

Suruí served as an executive producer on the 2022 National Geographic documentary film The Territory. The film covers three years of conflicts between indigenous people and the farmers and land developers trying to use indigenous land for their own purposes. The Territory was nominated for multiple Primetime Emmy Awards, including Outstanding Cinematography For A Nonfiction Program, Outstanding Directing For A Documentary/Nonfiction Program, and Exceptional Merit In Documentary Filmmaking. Suruí and her fellow filmmakers won the Emmy for Exceptional Merit in Documentary Filmmaking. In 2023, Suruí and her mother were taken hostage, along with British film director Heydon Prowse and a filmmaking crew, by a group of armed men, but were eventually released.
