= Rebecca Moore (scientist) =

American software engineer (born 1955)

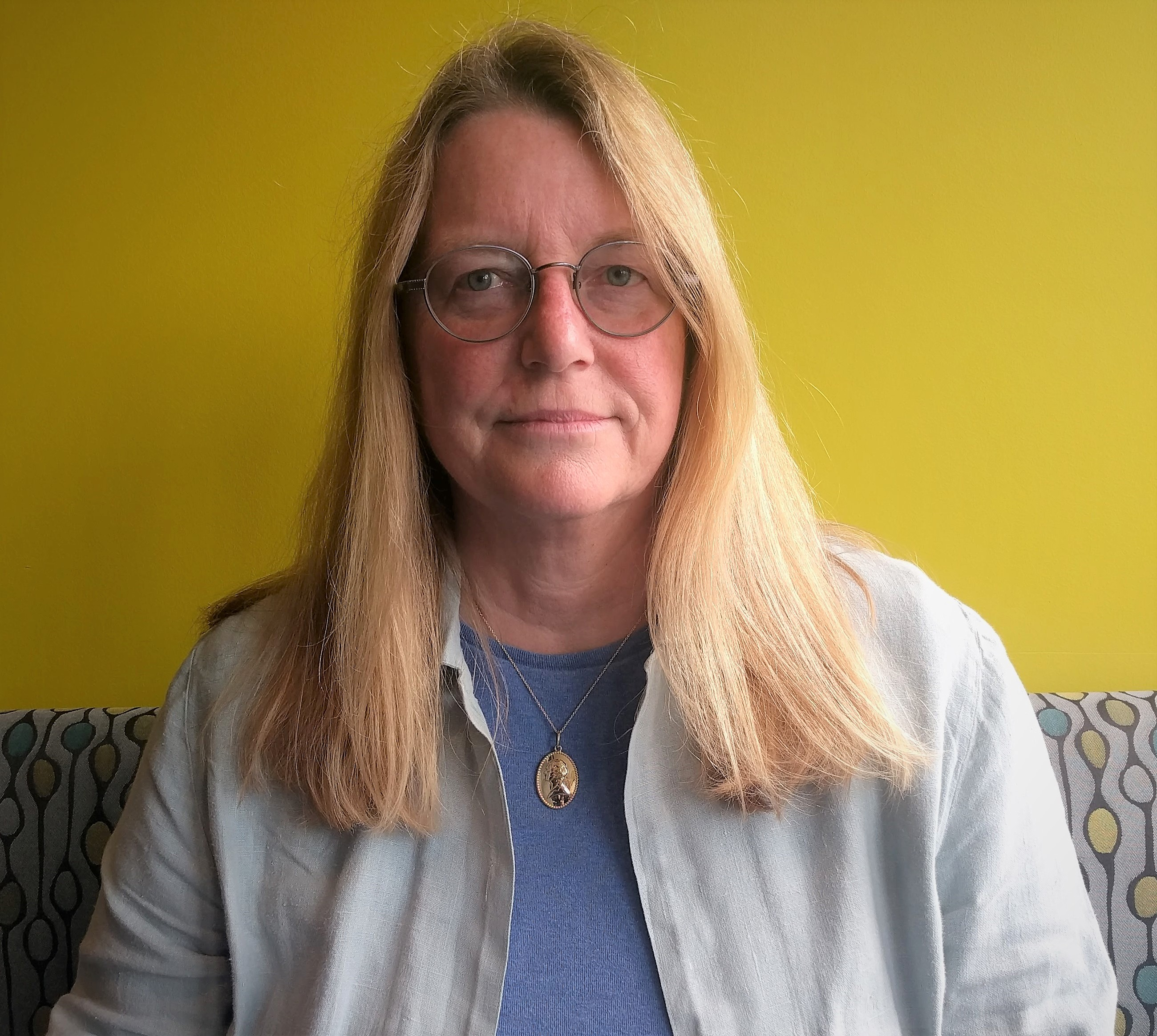
Rebecca Moore in 2016, wearing her Rachel Carson Award medal.

Rebecca Moore (born 1955) is an American software engineer, director of Google Earth, and director and founder of the Google Earth Outreach and Google Earth Engine computer mapping projects.

== Early life and career ==
Moore grew up in Roslyn, New York, with one sister and two brothers. Her father, Earle K. Moore, was a communications and civil rights lawyer in Manhattan, who won a landmark case establishing that broadcast stations must serve the interests of their viewers. Her brother, Frank C. Moore, was an artist and activist, including being an originator of the Red Ribbon project for AIDS solidarity. (Rebecca Moore completed his work setting up the Gesso Foundation for artists after his death.) She attended Roslyn High School, graduated Brown University with a bachelor's degree with honors in Artificial Intelligence in 1977, then worked as a software engineer for companies including Hewlett-Packard and General Instrument.

When her father died in 2001, then her brother Frank in early 2002, Moore felt a duty to accomplish something in her life, as they had. She returned to academia to study bioinformatics, to treat disease with the help of computer analysis, earning a master's degree in cognitive psychology from Stanford University, but left after three years before completing her PhD in computer science.

Moore was then living in Los Gatos, California, in the foothills of the Santa Cruz Mountains, a rural area that was poorly served by government agencies; an ambulance took 2 hours to reach a neighbor's house, partly because they were using a hand-drawn map from 1983. So Moore founded a civic association, the Mountain Resource Group, and began work on digital maps of the area. They were used by first responders, civil agencies, and her neighbors. She used consumer software, then professional geographic information systems software, before settling on Keyhole, Inc's Earth Viewer.

== Google Earth ==
Moore was an active user of Keyhole's Earth Viewer software, enough so that in 2005 she was invited by the company to give a tech talk on using the product. She gave a list of eight to ten specific suggestions to improve the tool. Google had recently acquired Keyhole, Inc (in October 2004), and offered her a job on the project, which would become Google Earth.

=== Google Earth Outreach ===
Google gives its employees 20% time, the ability to use a fifth of their hours to work on side projects, and Moore used hers to work on what would become Google Earth Outreach, acting as a link between the mapping software and the environmental community. Brian McClendon, a co-founder of Keyhole, Inc. then a VP leading Google Earth, was a strong supporter of the idea from the beginning, and made sure Google provided the funds.

In August 2005, the San Jose Water Company (SJWC) submitted a proposal to log a 1000-acre swathe of redwood trees in the Los Gatos Mountains, and sent copies to Moore and her neighbors. Moore started a subgroup of her civic association, Neighbors Against Irresponsible Logging, to oppose the project, and used the Google Earth application to create a detailed map, including a 3-D "flyover" movie, displaying the area that would be logged in relationship to the mountains and the local watershed. It demonstrated that logging trucks would be taking winding roads used by children to walk to school, and that helicopters would be carrying large tree trunks over homes, schools, and playgrounds. It was referenced in local and national newspapers, shown on local television news, to Ira Ruskin, the district representative in the California State Legislature, and to former vice president Al Gore, who issued a statement opposing the proposed logging. The debate went on for years; in 2006, Moore got Kenneth Adelman of the California Coastal Records Project to fly her in a helicopter over the SJWC land to take photographs to prove the water company owned more timberland than would qualify it for the open-ended logging permit that it was applying for. After a September 2007 California Department of Forestry and Fire Protection hearing, the proposal was defeated. Equally important, the publicity Moore's work had gathered by using Google Earth to save a redwood forest led to contacts by many nonprofits interested in working with Google Earth Outreach.

The first Google geoblog, a Web log with the entries referenced by geographical locations in Google Earth, was a joint project with the Jane Goodall Institute in 2006. It covered the daily lives of the chimpanzees of the Gombe National Park in Tanzania, and the field researchers who studied them. The Google Earth imagery was used to draw attention to the loss of chimpanzee habitat, and to map the location of chimpanzee poaching snares. Moore was a fan of Jane Goodall's work, and personally cold called JGI to propose the cooperation. Googlers returned to Gombe in 2014 with Google Street View cameras, to map the forest from the viewpoint of a person walking its trails. Goodall herself thanked Moore in her book Seeds of Hope, for her help and her personal friendship.

Another early Google Earth Outreach project was with Appalachian Voices, which used the tools to illustrate the effects of mountaintop removal mining, with before and after pictures of 470 mountains that have been razed for coal. Within a week of the launch of their project using Google Earth in 2007, their online petition got 12,000 signatures. Yet another 2007 project was a collaboration with the United States Holocaust Memorial Museum about the crisis in Darfur, controversially naming it a genocide, and showing satellite pictures of razed villages and refugee camps and personal photographs and stories of people who lost families and homes. By 2013, the HALO Trust was using Google Earth to help clear landmines, by mapping cleared and yet uncleared areas; a Google Earth Outreach grant funded an online minefield tour narrated by Angelina Jolie.

Moore was among the first to support the Paiter Suruí people, an indigenous tribe of the Amazon rainforest in Brazil, by teaching them to use Google's maps to preserve their culture and their land. The tribe only had its first contact with outsiders in 1969, but in the years since had seen their land destroyed by mining and logging. The tribe's chief, Almir Narayamoga Suruí, the first person of his tribe to go to college, discovered Google Earth in an Internet café, and thought it could be used to help. In 2007, the Amazon Conservation Team flew him to the United States, where he met with Moore in her Mountain View office at Google Earth Outreach. In 2008, Moore and four other Google employees flew to the Amazon to teach the Suruí, many of whom had never used a computer, to use Google's tools to make maps, blogs, photos, and YouTube videos to document the loss of their land; in exchange, the Suruí painted the Googlers' skin with Jenipapo berries and made them honorary members of the tribe. The Suruí blogs drew international attention. In 2009, the Googlers returned with Android phones equipped with GPS, that the tribe could use to photograph illegal logging to present as evidence to law enforcement, and inventory trees and calculate carbon content to apply for forest carbon offsets. They became the first indigenous people to generate credit by saving rainforest, and in 2013 had sold 120,000 tons of offsets to Natura. Moore unveiled the Surui cultural map in 2012.

=== Google Earth Engine ===
Moore founded the project that would become Google Earth Engine after she was approached by Carlos Souza Jr., a geoscientist from Imazon, on that first Brazil trip to aid the Suruí tribe in 2008. Souza asked for a way to analyze satellite data to observe and prevent illegal logging which was costing the Amazon rainforest more than 1 million acres each year. The project Moore's team built harnessed tens of thousands of computers to process and monitor Google Earth's satellite images and set off alarms about suspicious changes or activity. This would alert Imazon, or the Suruí, in enough time for people to be sent out to confirm illegal logging, and then notify the authorities. Imazon says this allowed them to reduce illegal logging in Paragominas by 97 percent between 2007 and 2010. Google Earth Engine launched to the public in 2010, and is used by over a thousand scientists around the world for applications from forecasting drought and estimating agricultural crop yield, to predicting where chimpanzees are likely to build their nests.

One of the first large scale Google Earth Engine projects was a study of global forest change. Researcher Matthew Hansen had been mapping global land cover since the mid-1990s, first at South Dakota State University, then at the University of Maryland, but lacked sufficient high-resolution data. The data came in 2008, when the United States Geological Survey made 3.6 million satellite images at 30 meter resolution from the Landsat program freely available on the Internet. The computer power to fully analyze it was provided by Moore and Google Earth Engine. For the release of Google Earth Engine in 2010, Moore, Hansen, and CONAFOR the Mexican government agency, processed 53,000 images in 15,000 computer hours to create the highest resolution forest and water map of Mexico ever. Then, for a global survey of all forestation change from 2000 to 2012, cloud computers processed 700,000 images in 1 million hours spread among 10,000 CPUs. The work was made available online and the resulting joint paper was published in the November 2013 issue of Science.

== Personal life ==
Moore credits her childhood with instilling a love of nature. Her hobbies include mountaineering and trail construction. In May 1978, Moore went on a 33-person Brown University expedition led by Thomas A. Mutch, to climb Devistan, a peak in the Nanda Devi region of the Himalayas. One died in the attempt. Moore was one of a four-person all female team to make the summit. In 2013, she made a memorial Google Earth map of the expedition. In 1990, Moore led a team climbing Denali in Alaska for 28 days. More recently, Moore and her neighbors in the Mountain Resource Group have built and mapped a Community Trail Network in the Santa Cruz Mountains using Google Earth, GPS, and skills she learned from the National Outdoor Leadership School when she was 20.

Moore has publicly said that she has two dogs, but no children, as she wouldn't have been able to have children and do her work.

== Awards received ==
- June 2013 White House Champion of Change for Open Science.
- September 2013 Zoological Society of London Award for Conservation Innovation.
- May 2016 National Audubon Society's Rachel Carson Award.
