= Catching Fire: The Story of Anita Pallenberg =

2023 documentary film

- Film poster
- Directed by: Alexis Bloom; Svetlana Zill
- Based on: Black Magic
- Produced by: Charlie Corwin
- Starring: Anita Pallenberg; Volker Schlöndorff; Metka Kosak; Stash Klossowski; Marlon Richards; Jake Weber; Angela Richards; Sandro Sursock; Theda Zawaiza; Kate Moss
- Narrated by: Scarlett Johansson
- Cinematography: Luca Ciuti; Catherine Derry; Nick Higgins; Bill Kirstein; Will Pugh; Axel Schneppat; Shane Sigler
- Edited by: Adam Evans; Hannah Vanderlan
- Music by: Will Bates
- Distributed by: Magnolia Pictures (United States)
- Release dates: May 22, 2023 (Cannes); May 3, 2024
- Running time: 113 minutes
- Country: United States
- Language: English
- Box office: $41,633

Catching Fire: The Story of Anita Pallenberg is a 2023 American documentary film about the Rolling Stones muse Anita Pallenberg. The film is based on Pallenberg's unpublished autobiography Black Magic that her children found after her death in 2017; passages from the document are read out in the film by Scarlett Johansson.

== Production ==
The film is based on an autobiographical manuscript titled Black Magic discovered by Pallenberg's children after her death in 2017.

== Release ==
The film released in the United Kingdom and Ireland on 17 May 2024.

== Reception ==
On the review aggregator website Rotten Tomatoes, 88% of 33 critics' reviews are positive, with an average rating of 7.3/10. Metacritic, which uses a weighted average, assigned the film a score of 64 out of 100, based on eight critics, indicating "generally favorable" reviews.

Peter Bradshaw of The Guardian stated that the film "contains some of the most chilling footage to be seen in any documentary", referring to the recording of Keith Richards performing hours after finding out his and Pallenberg's infant son Tara had died.
