= Primetime Emmy Award for Exceptional Merit in Documentary Filmmaking =

Television award category

- Awarded for: Exceptional Merit in Documentary Filmmaking
- Country: United States
- Presented by: Academy of Television Arts & Sciences
- First award: 2005
- Currently held by: The Librarians (2026)
- Website: emmys.com

The Primetime Emmy Award for Exceptional Merit in Documentary Filmmaking is handed out annually at the Creative Arts Emmy Award ceremony since 2005. Entries are reviewed by a jury on the basis of the "filmmaker's expressed vision, compelling power of storytelling, artistry or innovation of craft, and the capacity to inform, transport, impact, enlighten, and create a moving and indelible work that elevates the art of documentary filmmaking." Entrants are ineligible for Outstanding Informational Series or Special and Outstanding Documentary or Nonfiction Special.

== Winners and nominations ==
=== 2000s ===
Year	Program	Producers	Network
2005 (57th)
2005 (57th)	Death in Gaza	Sheila Nevins, executive producer; Nancy Abraham, supervising producer; James Miller and Saira Shah, producers	HBO
2005 (57th)	Guerrilla: The Taking of Patty Hearst (American Experience)	Mark Samels and Nick Fraser, executive producers; Robert Stone, producer	PBS
2005 (57th)	Last Letters Home: Voices of American Troops from the Battlefields of Iraq	John Hoffman, Sheila Nevins and Jane Bornemeier, executive producers; Bill Couturié, produced by	HBO
2005 (57th)	With All Deliberate Speed	Steve Carlis, Steve Rosenbaum and Don Baer, executive producers; Peter Gilbert, produced by	Discovery
2006 (58th)
2006 (58th)	Baghdad ER	Sheila Nevins, executive producer; Jon Alpert, Matthew O'Neill and Joseph Feury, produced by	HBO
2006 (58th)	Two Days in October (American Experience)	Sally Jo Fifer, executive producer; Steven Bognar and Julia Reichert, producers; Lois Vossen, series producer	PBS
2006 (58th)	Beslan: Three Days in September	Joe Halderman, produced by; Peter Van Sant, Michael McHugh and Michael Vele, producers	Showtime
2006 (58th)	Combat Diary: The Marines of Lima Company	Nancy Dubuc and Dierdre O'Hearn, executive producers for A&E; Michael Epstein and Jonathan Yellen, produced by	A&E
2006 (58th)	In the Realms of the Unreal (POV)	Sally Jo Fifer and Cara Mertes, executive producers; Jessica Yu and Susan West, producers	PBS
2007 (59th)
2007 (59th)	A Lion in the House (Independent Lens)	Sally Jo Fifer, executive producer; Steven Bognar and Julia Reichert, producers; Lois Vossen, series producer	PBS
2007 (59th)	When the Levees Broke: A Requiem in Four Acts	Sheila Nevins, executive producer; Samuel D. Pollard and Spike Lee, producers; Jacqueline Glover, supervising producer	HBO
2007 (59th)	Jonestown: The Life and Death of Peoples Temple (American Experience)	Mark Samels, executive producer; Stanley Nelson, producer; Sharon Grimberg, series producer	PBS
2008 (60th)
2008 (60th)	White Light/Black Rain: The Destruction of Hiroshima and Nagasaki	Sheila Nevins and Robert Richter, executive producers; Steven Okazaki, producer; Sara Bernstein, supervising producer	HBO
2008 (60th)	Oswald's Ghost (American Experience)	Mark Samels, executive producer; Sharon Grimberg, senior producer; Robert Stone, producer	PBS
2008 (60th)	Walt Whitman (American Experience)	Mark Samels, executive producer; Patrick Long and Jamila Wignot, producers; Mark Zwonitzer, filmmaker	PBS
2009 (61st)
2009 (61st)	The Alzheimer's Project: "The Memory Loss Tapes"	Sheila Nevins and Maria Shriver, executive producers; John Hoffman, series producer; Shari Cookson and Nick Doob, produced by	HBO
2009 (61st)	Section 60: Arlington National Cemetery	Sheila Nevins, executive producer; Jacqueline Glover, supervising producer; Jon Alpert and Matthew O'Neill, produced by	HBO

=== 2010s ===
Year	Program	Producers	Network
2010 (62nd)
2010 (62nd)	The Betrayal – Nerakhoon (POV)	Simon Kilmurry and Cara Mertes, executive producers; Ellen Kuras and Flora Fernandez-Marengo, produced by	PBS
2010 (62nd)	Brick City	Marc Levin, Mark Benjamin, Forest Whitaker and Mala Chapple, executive producers	Sundance
2010 (62nd)	My Lai (American Experience)	Mark Samels, executive producer; Barak Goodman], producer	PBS
2010 (62nd)	Patti Smith: Dream of Life (POV)	Simon Kilmurry and Steven Sebring, executive producers; Margaret Smilow, executive producer/producer	PBS
2010 (62nd)	Pressure Cooker	Jeff Skoll and Diane Weyermann, executive producers; Jennifer Grausman, producer	BET
2010 (62nd)	Sergio	Sheila Nevins, executive producer; Nancy Abraham, senior producer; Greg Barker, John Battsek and Julie Goldman, produced by	HBO
2011 (63rd)
2011 (63rd)	Freedom Riders (American Experience)	Mark Samels, executive producer; Stanley Nelson and Laurens Grant, produced by; Sharon Grimberg, senior producer	PBS
2011 (63rd)	Gasland	Trish Adlesic, Josh Fox and Molly Gandour, producers	HBO
2011 (63rd)	The Most Dangerous Man in America: Daniel Ellsberg and the Pentagon Papers (POV)	Rick Goldsmith and Judith Ehrlich, producers	PBS
2012 (64th)
2012 (64th)	Have You Heard from Johannesburg? (Independent Lens)	Sally Jo Fifer, executive producer; Connie Field, producer; Lois Vossen, series senior producer	PBS
2012 (64th)	The Amish (American Experience)	Mark Samels, executive producer; Sharon Grimberg, senior producer; Callie T. Wiser and David Belton, producers	PBS
2012 (64th)	Paradise Lost 3: Purgatory	Sheila Nevins, executive producer; Joe Berlinger and Jonathan Silberberg, producers; Nancy Abraham, senior producers	HBO
2013 (65th)
2013 (65th)	Mea Maxima Culpa: Silence in the House of God	Sheila Nevins, executive producer; Alex Gibney, Alexandra Johnes, Todd Wider and Jedd Wider, producers; Sara Bernstein, supervising producer	HBO
2014 (66th)
2014 (66th)	Life According to Sam	Sheila Nevins, executive producer; Nancy Abraham, senior producer; Sean Fine and Andrea Nix Fine, produced by	HBO
2014 (66th)	The Amish: Shunned (American Experience)	Mark Samels, executive producer; Sharon Grimberg, senior producer; Callie T. Wiser, producer	PBS
2014 (66th)	Brave Miss World	Lati Grobman, executive producer; Cecilia Peck, Inbal B. Lessner and Motty Reif, producers	Netflix
2014 (66th)	Hillsborough (30 for 30 Soccer Stories)	Connor Schell, John Dahl and John Battsek, executive producers; Daniel Gordon and Deirdre Fenton, producers	ESPN
2015 (67th)
2015 (67th)	Citizenfour	Laura Poitras, Mathilde Bonnefoy and Dirk Wilutzky, produced by	HBO
2015 (67th)	The Great Invisible (Independent Lens)	Margaret Brown, Jason Orans and Julie Goldman, produced by; Lois Vossen, senior series producer	PBS
2015 (67th)	Hot Girls Wanted	Jill Bauer, Ronna Gradus and Rashida Jones, produced by	Netflix
2016 (68th)
2016 (68th)	Cartel Land	Kathryn Bigelow, Molly Thompson and Robert DeBitetto, executive producers; Tom Yellin and Matthew Heineman, producers	A&E
2016 (68th)	Jim: The James Foley Story	Peter Kunhardt, Sheila Nevins and Jacqueline Glover, executive producers; Eva Lipman, George Kunhardt and Teddy Kunhardt, produced by	HBO
2016 (68th)	The Black Panthers: Vanguard of the Revolution	Sally Jo Fifer and Lois Vossen, executive producers; Stanley Nelson and Laurens Grant, produced by	PBS
2016 (68th)	The Hunting Ground	Amy Entelis, Vinnie Malhotra and Maria Cuomo Cole, executive producers; Amy Ziering, producer	CNN
2016 (68th)	Racing Extinction	Dieter Paulmann and John Hoffman, executive producers; Olivia Ahnemann and Fisher Stevens, produced by	Discovery
2016 (68th)	Winter on Fire: Ukraine's Fight for Freedom	Lati Grobman and David Dinerstein, executive producers; Evgeny Afineevsky and Den Tolmor, produced by	Netflix
2017 (69th)
2017 (69th)	LA 92	T. J. Martin and Daniel Lindsay, a film by; Jonathan Chinn and Simon Chinn, produced by	Nat Geo
2017 (69th)	Bright Lights: Starring Carrie Fisher and Debbie Reynolds	Sheila Nevins and Brett Ratner, executive producers; Nancy Abraham, senior producer; Alexis Bloom and Fisher Stevens, produced by	HBO
2017 (69th)	O.J.: Made in America	Connor Schell and Libby Geist, executive producers; Tamara Rosenberg and Nina Krstic, producers; Ezra Edelman and Caroline Waterlow, produced by	ESPN
2017 (69th)	Oklahoma City (American Experience)	Mark Samels, executive producer; Susan Bellows, senior producer; Barak Goodman and Emily Singer Chapman, produced by	PBS
2017 (69th)	The White Helmets	Joanna Natasegara, produced by	Netflix
2018 (70th)
2018 (70th)	Strong Island	Joslyn Barnes and Yance Ford, produced by	Netflix
2018 (70th)	City of Ghosts	Alex Gibney, Molly Thompson and Stacey Offman, executive producers; Matthew Heineman, produced by	A&E
2018 (70th)	Jane	Tim Pastore, executive producer; Brett Morgen, Bryan Burk and James Smith, produced by	Nat Geo
2018 (70th)	What Haunts Us	Frank Marshall and Matt Tolmach, executive producers; Paige Goldberg Tolmach and Sarah Gibson, producers	Starz
2019 (71st)
2019 (71st)	RBG	Julie Cohen and Betsy West, produced by; Amy Entelis and Courtney Sexton, executive producers	CNN
2019 (71st)	The Sentence	Sam Bisbee and Jackie Kelman Bisbee, produced by; Rudy Valdez and Theodora Dunlap, executive producers	HBO
2019 (71st)	Divide and Conquer: The Story of Roger Ailes	Alexis Bloom and Will Cohen, produced by; Molly Thompson and Alex Gibney, executive producers	A&E
2019 (71st)	Hale County This Morning, This Evening	RaMell Ross, Joslyn Barnes and Su Kim, produced by; Lois Vossen, executive producer	PBS
2019 (71st)	Three Identical Strangers	Becky Read, produced by; Grace Hughes-Hallett, producer	CNN

=== 2020s ===
Year	Program	Producers	Network
2020 (72nd)
2020 (72nd)	The Cave	Kirstine Barfod and Sigrid Dyekjær, produced by; Pernille Rose Grønkjær, Eva Mulvad, Carolyn Berstein, Ryan Harrington and Matt Renner, executive producers	Nat Geo
2020 (72nd)	Chasing the Moon (American Experience)	Robert Stone, produced by; Ray Rothrock, Daniel Aegerter and Keith Haviland, producers; Susan Bellows, senior producer; Mark Samels, executive producer	PBS
2020 (72nd)	Moonlight Sonata: Deafness in Three Movements	Tahria Sheather and Irene Taylor Brodsky, produced by; Nancy Abraham, Lisa Heller, Sheila Nevins and Sara Bernstein, executive producers	HBO
2020 (72nd)	One Child Nation	Nanfu Wang, Jialing Zhang, Julie Goldman, Christopher Clements and Carolyn Hepburn, produced by; Sally Jo Fifer and Lois Vossen, executive producers	PBS
2021 (73rd)
2021 (73rd)	76 Days	Hao Wu and Jean Tsien, produced by	Pluto TV
2021 (73rd)	Dick Johnson Is Dead	Katy Chevigny and Marilyn Ness, producers; Kirsten Johnson, produced by	Netflix
2021 (73rd)	Welcome to Chechnya	Alice Henty, David France, Joy A. Tomchin, Askold Kurov and Igor Myakotin, produced by	HBO
2022 (74th)
2022 (74th)	When Claude Got Shot	Lois Vossen, executive producer; Brad Lichtenstein, Steven Cantor and Jamie Schutz, producers	PBS
2022 (74th)	Changing the Game	Clare Tucker and Alex Schmider, produced by	Hulu
2022 (74th)	Frederick Douglass: In Five Speeches	Henry Louis Gates Jr., Dyllan McGee, Nancy Abraham, Lisa Heller and Sara Rodriguez, executive producers; Oluwaseun Babalola, producer	HBO
2023 (75th)
2023 (75th)	The Territory	Alex Pritz, Darren Aronofsky, Sigrid Dyekjær, Will N. Miller, Gabriel Uchida and Lizzie Gillett, produced by; Txai Suruí, executive producer	Nat Geo
2023 (75th)	The Accused: Damned or Devoted?	Mohammed Ali Naqvi, produced by/directed by	PBS
2023 (75th)	Aftershock	Paula Eiselt and Tonya Lewis Lee, a film by	Hulu
2023 (75th)	Last Flight Home	Ondi Timoner and David Turner, produced by	Paramount+
2024 (76th)
2024 (76th)	Going to Mars: The Nikki Giovanni Project	Joe Brewster, Michèle Stephenson and Tommy Oliver, produced by	HBO
2024 (76th)	Beyond Utopia (Independent Lens)	Lois Vossen, executive producer; Jana Edelbaum, Rachel Cohen and Sue Mi Terry, producers; Madeleine Gavin, director	PBS
2024 (76th)	Stamped from the Beginning	Dr. Ibram X. Kendi, Geoff Martz, Mara Brock Akil and Susie Fitzgerald, executive producers; Alisa Payne, Roger Ross Williams and David Teague, producers	Netflix
2025 (77th)
2025 (77th)	Patrice: The Movie	Ted Passon, director & executive producer; David Sloan, senior executive producer; Claire Weinraub and Poh Si Teng, executive producers; Kyla Harris, Innbo Shim and Emily Spivack, producers	Hulu
2025 (77th)	I Am: Celine Dion	Dave Platel, Denis Savage, Shane Carter and Krista Wegener, executive producers; Tom Mackay, Julie Begey Seureau and Irene Taylor, produced by	Prime Video
2025 (77th)	The Remarkable Life of Ibelin	Benjamin Ree, director; Ingvil Giske, producer	Netflix
2026 (78th)
2026 (78th)	The Librarians	Lois Vossen, executive producer; Kim A. Snyder, Janique L. Robillard, Maria Cuomo Cole and Jana Edelbaum, produced by	PBS
2026 (78th)	The Tale of Silyan	Davis Guggenheim, Casey Meurer, Carolyn Bernstein and Tim Horsburgh, executive producers; Tamara Kotevska, Jean Dakar and Anna Hashmi, producers	Nat Geo

== Total awards by network ==
- HBO – 10
- PBS – 5
- Nat Geo – 3
- A&E – 1
- CNN – 1
- Hulu - 1
- Netflix – 1
- Pluto - 1
