= Hao Wu (director) =

Chinese American film director, producer and writer

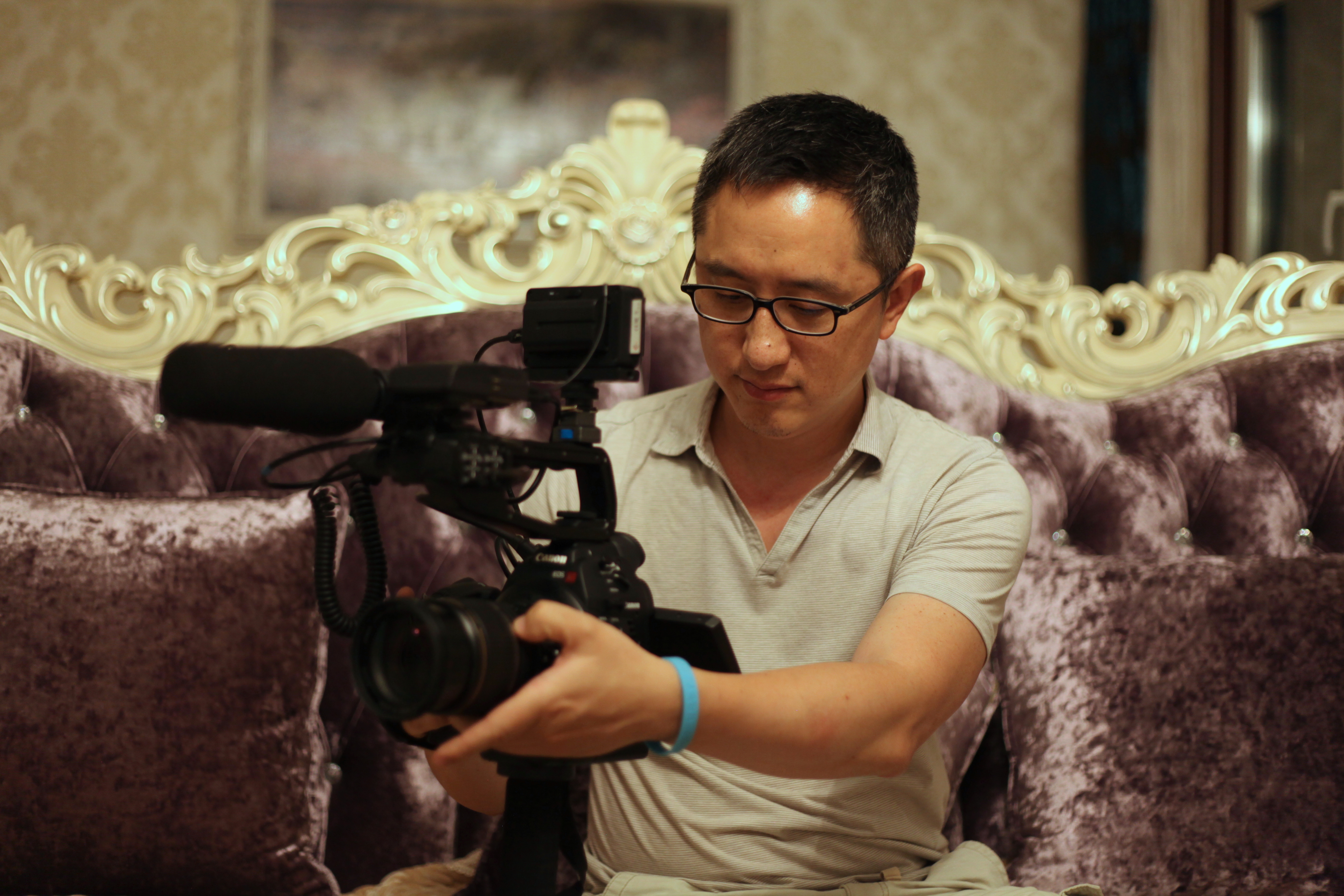
Hao Wu filming People's Republic of Desire

Hao Wu (Chinese: 吴皓; pinyin: Wú Hào) is a Chinese American film director, producer and writer living in New York. Wu was also a blogger known as Tian Yi. He is otherwise best known for his feature-length documentary, People's Republic of Desire, winner of the Grand Jury Award for Best Documentary Feature at the 2018 South by Southwest, All in My Family, a Netflix Original Documentary, and 76 Days, about the early days of the COVID-19 outbreak in Wuhan, China. In 2021, Wu won a Peabody Award and a Primetime Emmy Award for Exceptional Merit in Documentary Filmmaking for 76 Days.

== Education ==
- Bachelor of Science in Biology from the University of Science and Technology of China in 1992.
- M.S. in Molecular Biology from Brandeis University in 1995.
- MBA from the Ross School of Business, University of Michigan, in 2000.

== Career ==
Wu worked as a molecular biologist before attending business school. After receiving his MBA degree, he worked in management positions at technology companies including Excite@Home, EarthLink, Alibaba Group and TripAdvisor. In 2011, he left TripAdvisor to become a full-time filmmaker.

In 2005, Wu's film career started with his first film, Beijing or Bust, a documentary about the trials and tribulations of six American born Chinese who chose to return to Beijing and the cultural adaptation they faced. The film was shown in the 6th Annual San Diego Asian Film Festival in 2005. Wu's second film, The Road to Fame, follows students at China's top drama academy, as they prepare to stage a Chinese version of the musical Fame. A co-production with BBC Storyville, VPRO, DR and CNEX, the film premiered at Sheffield Doc/Fest in June 2013. His third film, People's Republic of Desire, about China's live streaming crazed, premiered at the 2018 South by Southwest and won the Grand Jury Award for Best Documentary Feature. Wu then released All in My Family, a Netflix Original Documentary short, in 2019.

In 2020, Wu worked with two collaborators remotely on 76 Days, about the 76 days of lockdown of Wuhan at the start of the COVID-19 pandemic. The film premiered at Toronto International Film Festival in September 2020. Distributed by MTV Documentary Films and Dogwoof, it was named a Critic’s Pick by The New York Times. In 2021, the film was shortlisted for the Academy Award for Best Documentary Feature, nominated for the Gotham Awards, and won a Peabody Award and a Primetime Emmy Award for Exceptional Merit in Documentary Filmmaking.

Wu co-directed “Admissions Granted,” a feature documentary about the landmark SFFA v. Harvard case that ended race considerations in college admissions in the U.S. The film was distributed by MSNBC Films in 2024.

Wu's latest feature documentary about the TikTok ban, "TikTok Never Dies," premiere at Tribeca Festival in 2026.

From 2014-2016, Wu was a fellow at New America, a D.C.-based think tank.

== Detention ==
Wu was detained by the Chinese government on February 22, 2006, when he was making a documentary on "underground" Chinese house churches. After almost five months, he was released on July 11, 2006.

== Filmography ==
- 2005 Beijing or Bust - Director, Producer, Cinematographer, Editor.
- 2013 The Road to Fame - Director, Producer, Cinematographer, Editor.
- 2014 Nowhere to Call Home: A Tibetan in Beijing - Producer.
- 2018 People's Republic of Desire - Director, Producer, Cinematographer, Editor.
- 2019 All In My Family - Director, Producer, Cinematographer, Editor.
- 2020 76 Days - Director, Producer, Editor.
- 2021 Convergence: Courage in a Crisis - Executive Producer, Co-producer.
- 2024: Admissions Granted - Director, Producer
