= Fisher Stevens =

American actor, director, producer and writer (born 1963)

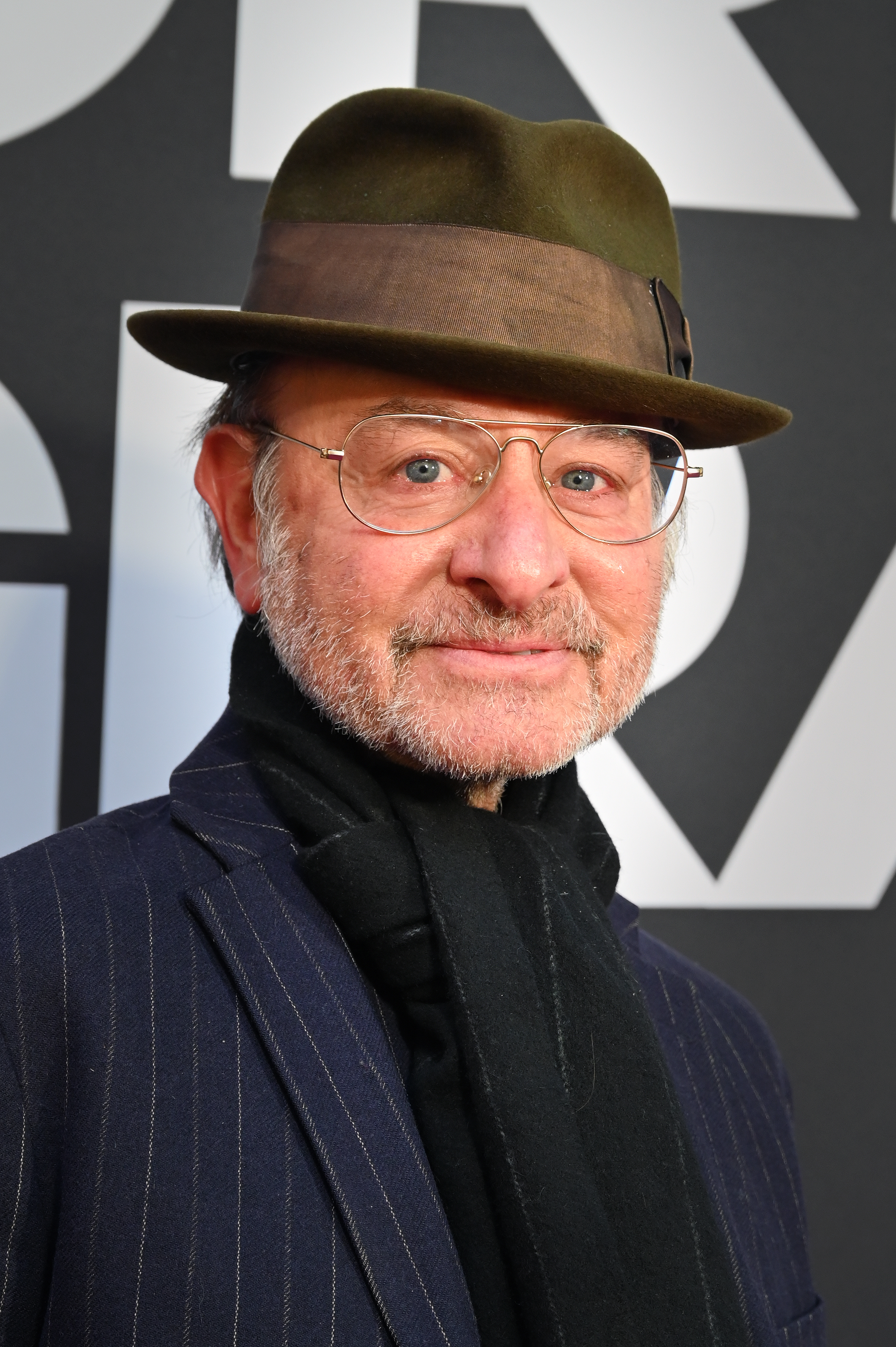
- Stevens in 2025
- Born: Stephen Fisher; November 27, 1963 (age 62); Chicago, Illinois, U.S.
- Occupations: Actor, director, producer, writer
- Years active: 1981–present
- Spouse: Alexis Bloom (m. 2017)
- Children: 2

Stephen Fisher (born November 27, 1963), known professionally as Fisher Stevens, is an American actor, director, producer and writer. As an actor, he is best known for his portrayals of Ben Jabituya/Jahveri in Short Circuit (1986) and Short Circuit 2 (1988). He is also a documentary filmmaker, having won the Academy Award for Best Documentary Feature as one of the producers of The Cove (2009). He also directed the documentaries Crazy Love (2007) and Before the Flood (2016).

Stevens is known for his roles in films such as Reversal of Fortune (1990), Bob Roberts (1992), Hackers (1995), Anything Else (2003), and Hail, Caesar! (2016). He has acted in the Wes Anderson films The Grand Budapest Hotel (2014), Isle of Dogs (2018), The French Dispatch (2021), and Asteroid City (2023).

In television he portrayed Chuck Fishman in the CBS series Early Edition (1996–2000), Marvin Gerard on NBC's The Blacklist (2015–2022), Gabriel Kovac in CBS's The Good Fight (2017–2020), and Hugo Baker in the HBO drama series Succession (2019–2023).

== Early life ==
Stevens was born in Chicago, the son of Jewish parents Sally and Norman Fisher. Stevens grew up in the Chicago area, living in Hyde Park, Highland Park, and Evanston and describes himself as a "white Jewish kid from Chicago".

His parents divorced when he was 13, after which he moved to New York with his mother. At age 16, Stevens landed his first film role, acting in the horror film The Burning. He completed one year at New York University before deciding to pursue acting full time. He adopted the stage name "Fisher Stevens" upon joining the Screen Actors Guild because the Guild had several existing actors named "Steven Fisher".

== Career ==
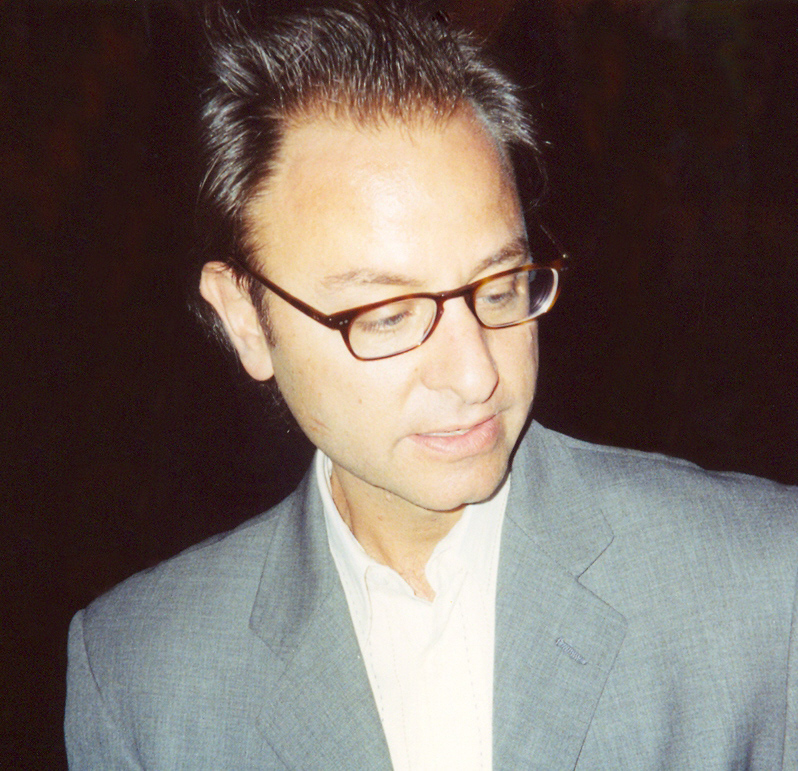
Stevens in 2006

As an actor, Stevens is known for his roles as Chuck Fishman on Early Edition, Seamus O'Neill on Key West, Eugene "The Plague" Belford in Hackers, Iggy Koopa in Super Mario Bros., Hawk Ganz in The Flamingo Kid, and his role as the Indian robotics scientist Ben Jabituya/Jahveri in Short Circuit and Short Circuit 2, respectively.

Stevens has a Broadway and Off-Broadway career spanning nearly three decades. In the 1980s, he played David alongside Harvey Fierstein in Torch Song Trilogy, and went on to star in Brighton Beach Memoirs. In 1988, he and John Leguizamo appeared in a production of A Midsummer Night's Dream where he played Demetrius.

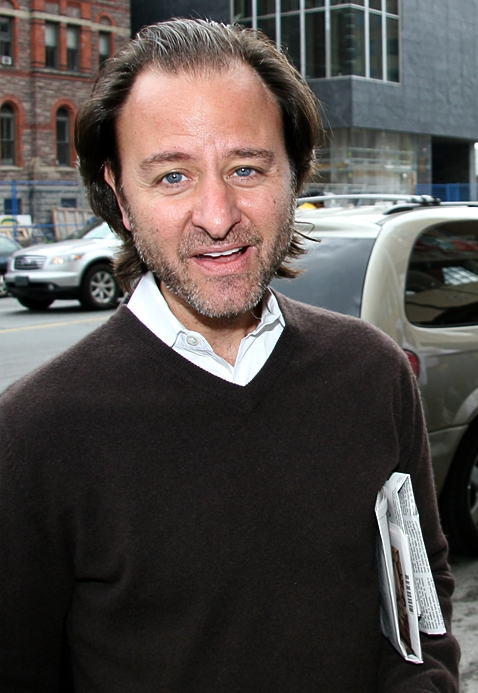
Stevens in 2007

In June 2010, Stevens made his major theatrical directing debut with John Leguizamo's one-man show, Ghetto Klown (originally called Klass Klown), which eventually ran on Broadway from March to July 2011. On July 13, 2012, PBS debuted Tales From a Ghetto Klown, a documentary about the development of the show which prominently features Stevens.

In 2010, Stevens and director Louie Psihoyos won the Academy Award for Best Documentary Feature at the 82nd Academy Awards for co-producing The Cove.

He is a signatory of the Film Workers for Palestine boycott pledge that was published in September 2025.

== Personal life ==
Stevens dated actress Michelle Pfeiffer from 1989 until 1992. Their relationship ended when Stevens, 28, was caught cheating with aspiring actress and high school senior Jamie Golightly, 17. Stevens later dated longtime filmmaking partner and producer Alexis Bloom. The couple married in 2017 in a private ceremony. They have two children.

Stevens is a survivor of Hodgkin lymphoma.

== Filmography ==
=== Actor ===
==== Film ====
Year	Title	Role	Notes
1981	The Burning	Woodstock	
1983	Baby It's You	Stage Manager	
1984	The Brother from Another Planet	Card Trickster	
1984	The Flamingo Kid	Henry "Hawk" Ganz	
1985	My Science Project	Vince Latello	
1986	Short Circuit	Ben Jahveri	
1986	The Boss' Wife	Carlos Delgado	
1988	Short Circuit 2	Ben Jahveri	
1989	Bloodhounds of Broadway	"Hotfoot" Harry	
1990	Point of View	Performer	
1990	Reversal of Fortune	David Marriott	
1991	The Marrying Man	Sammy	
1991	Mystery Date	Dwight	
1992	Lift	Joe	Short
1992	Bob Roberts	Rock Bork	
1992	Hero	Director of Channel 4 Crash Feature	Cameo
1993	When the Party's Over	Alexander Midnight	
1993	Super Mario Bros.	Iggy Koopa	
1994	Nina Takes a Lover	Paulie	
1994	Only You	Larry Corvatch	
1995	Cold Fever	Jack	
1995	Hackers	Eugene "The Plague" Belford	
1996	The Pompatus of Love	Sitcom Star	
1997	Four Days in September	Mowinkel	
1999	Taxman	Kenneth Green	
1999	The Tic Code	Morris	
2000	Sam the Man	Sam Manning	
2000	Lisa Picard Is Famous	Himself	
2001	3 A.M.	Haplin	
2001	Prison Song	Prosecutor	
2001	Piñero	Public Theatre Cashier	
2002	Undisputed	James "Ratbag" Kroycek	
2003	Kill the Poor	Stuffed Shirt	
2003	Uptown Girls	Himself	
2003	Anything Else	Manager	
2003	Easy Six	Officer Donny	
2003	Reply	Blu (voice)	
2004	On the Couch	Gary	Short
2005	Factotum	Manny	
2005	Undiscovered	Garret Schweck	
2005	Slow Burn	Alan Turlock	
2006	Kettle of Fish	Bruce	
2007	Red Angel	David	Short
2007	Awake	Dr. Puttnam	
2010	Fake	Tom Kozinski	
2010	Rio Sex Comedy	Fish	
2010	Rising Stars	Mo	
2010	The Experiment	Dr. Archaleta	
2010	Henry's Crime	Eddie's Vibes	
2012	One for the Money	Morty Beyers	
2012	LOL	Roman	
2013	Movie 43	Vrankovich / Minotaur	Alternate version
2014	The Grand Budapest Hotel	M. Robin	
2014	Mission Blue	Himself	Documentary
2014	United Passions	Carl Hirschmann	
2016	Hail, Caesar!	Communist Writer	
2018	Isle of Dogs	Scrap (voice)	
2019	Motherless Brooklyn	Lou	
2021	Palmer	Additional voices	
2021	The French Dispatch	Story Editor	
2021	Sing 2	Additional voice	
2023	Asteroid City	Detective 1	
2023	Coup!	Upton Sinclair	
2025	Song Sung Blue	Dave Watson	
2026	In the Grey	Mr. Horowitz	

==== Television ====
Year	Title	Role	Notes
1980	One Life to Live	Unknown	
1983	Ryan's Hope	Henry Popkin	
1984	CBS Schoolbreak Special	Gary Gordon	Episode: "The Alfred G. Graebner Memorial High School Handbook of Rules and Regulations"
1986	Tall Tales & Legends	Indian Chief	Episode: "Ponce de Leon"
1986	Saturday Night Live	Smoker	Episode: "Steve Guttenberg/The Pretenders"
1989	Columbo	Alex Brady	Episode: "Murder, Smoke and Shadows"
1990	The Young Riders	"Bulldog"	Episode: "Bull Dog"
1991	General Motors Theatre	Wally Zuckerman	Episode: "It's Called the Sugar Plum"
1993	Key West	Seamus O'Neill	13 episodes
1995	Friends	Roger	Episode: "The One with the Boobies"
1995	Homicide: Life on the Street	Jonathan Heine	Episode: "Autofocus"
1995	Law & Order	Ross Fineman	Episode: "Angel"
1996	The Right to Remain Silent	Dale Meyerson	Television movie
1996–2000	Early Edition	Chuck Fishman	48 episodes
2000	The Hunger	Max Armstrong	Episode: "The Suction Method"
2001	Frasier	Dr. Sheldon Morey	Episode: "The Wizard and Roz"
2001	100 Centre Street	Ben Berkowitz	Episode: "Queenie's Running"
2001	Jenifer	Dr. Aaron Sanders	Television movie
2002	Is It College Yet?	(voice)	Television movie
2002	Hack	Donnie Franco	Episode: "Favors"
2003	The Lives They Lived	Narrator	Television movie
2004	Hope & Faith	Nick Spinelli	Episode: "The Diner Show"
2004	Dr. Vegas	Charlie	Episode: "Dead Man, Live Bet"
2004–2007	Law & Order: Criminal Intent	Performer	2 episodes
2008	It's Always Sunny in Philadelphia	Lyle Korman	Episode: "Paddy's Pub: The Worst Bar in Philadelphia"
2008–2010	Lost	George Minkowski	6 episodes
2009	Medium	Neal Greybridge	Episode: "Medium is the Message"
2009	Numb3rs	John Buckley	2 episodes
2009	The Grean Teem	Jack Fisher	Television movie
2010	Ugly Betty	Mr. Z	Episode: "Back in her Place"
2010	The Mentalist	Tolman Bunting	Episode: "Season 2 Episode 21"
2011	Californication	"Zig" Semetauer	Episode: "Monkey Business"
2011	Damages	Therapist	4 episodes
2012–2016	Law & Order: Special Victims Unit	Alvin Gilbert / Ted Scott	2 episodes
2015	Elementary	Marty Ward	Episode: "Under My Skin"
2015–2022	The Blacklist	Marvin Gerard	15 episodes
2016	The Night Of	Saul	3 episodes
2017	Red Oaks	Jerry	Episode: "Summer in the City"
2017	Vice Principals	Brian Biehn	4 episodes
2017–2020	The Good Fight	Gabriel Kovac	3 episodes
2019–2023	Succession	Hugo Baker	19 episodes
2022	Would I Lie to You?	Himself	Episode: "Banana Bread"
2024	Ripley	Edward T. Cavanagh	Episode: "VII Macabre Entertainment"
2024	Evil	Demon of Grief (voice)	Episode: "How to Build a Coffin"
2024	Sing: Thriller	Police Officer	Television short

=== Director ===
Year	Title	Notes
1995	Call of the Wylie	
1996	Phinehas	
1998–1999	Early Edition	2 episodes
2002	Just a Kiss	
2007	Crazy Love	Co-directed with Dan Klores
2010–2011	John Leguizamo - Ghetto Klown	Opened on Broadway March 2011
2012	Stand Up Guys	
2016	Before the Flood	
2016	Bright Lights: Starring Carrie Fisher and Debbie Reynolds	
2019	And We Go Green	
2021	Palmer	
2023	Beckham	

=== Producer ===
Year	Title	Notes
2000	Sam the Man	
2001	The Château	
2001	Piñero	
2002	Swimfan	
2003	Uptown Girls	
2004	Yes	
2005	Slow Burn	
2006	A Prairie Home Companion	
2006	Once in a Lifetime: The Extraordinary Story of the New York Cosmos	
2006	Wedding Daze	
2007	Crazy Love	
2007	Meet Bill	
2007	Feast of Love	
2007	Awake	
2008	The Midnight Meat Train	
2009	The Grean Teem	
2009	Balls Out: Gary the Tennis Coach	
2009	Tenderness	
2009	The Cove	Academy Award for Best Documentary
2011	Blank City	
2011	Hollywood Renegade	
2011	Bad Trip	
2011	Mission Blue	
2012	Beware of Mr. Baker	
2015	Racing Extinction	
2016	Sky Ladder: The Art of Cai Guo-Qiang	
2016	Before the Flood	
2020	Tiger King	
2023	Beckham	
2023	We Are Guardians	

=== Writer ===
- Sam the Man (2000, story)
- The Grean Teem (2009, story)

=== Narrator ===
- Secondhand Souls: A Novel by Christopher Moore
- A Dirty Job by Christopher Moore
- Lamb: The Gospel According to Biff, Christ's Childhood Pal by Christopher Moore
- The Highest Tide: A Novel by Jim Lynch

== Awards and nominations ==
Year	Award	Category	Nominated work	Result	Ref.
2009	Academy Award	Best Documentary Feature	The Cove	Won	
2012	Primetime Emmy Awards	Outstanding Documentary Series	American Masters	Nominated	
2016	Primetime Emmy Awards	Exceptional Merit in Documentary Filmmaking	Racing Extinction	Nominated	
2017	Primetime Emmy Awards	Exceptional Merit in Documentary Filmmaking	Bright Lights: Starring Carrie Fisher and Debbie Reynolds	Nominated	
2017	Primetime Emmy Awards	Outstanding Directing for a Documentary Program	Bright Lights: Starring Carrie Fisher and Debbie Reynolds	Nominated	
2020	Primetime Emmy Awards	Outstanding Documentary or Nonfiction Series	Tiger King	Nominated	
2024	Primetime Emmy Awards	Outstanding Documentary or Nonfiction Series	Beckham	Won	
2024	Primetime Emmy Awards	Outstanding Directing for a Documentary Program	Beckham: What Makes David Run	Nominated	
2016	Cannes Film Festival	Golden Eye	Bright Lights: Starring Carrie Fisher and Debbie Reynolds	Nominated	
2016	Toronto International Film Festival	People's Choice Award	Before the Flood	Nominated	
2022	Saturn Award	Best Guest-Starring Performance in a Network or Cable Television Series	The Blacklist	Nominated	
2022	Screen Actors Guild Awards	Outstanding Ensemble in a Drama Series	Succession	Won	
2024	Screen Actors Guild Awards	Outstanding Ensemble in a Drama Series	Succession	Won	
