= Rachel Carson Award =

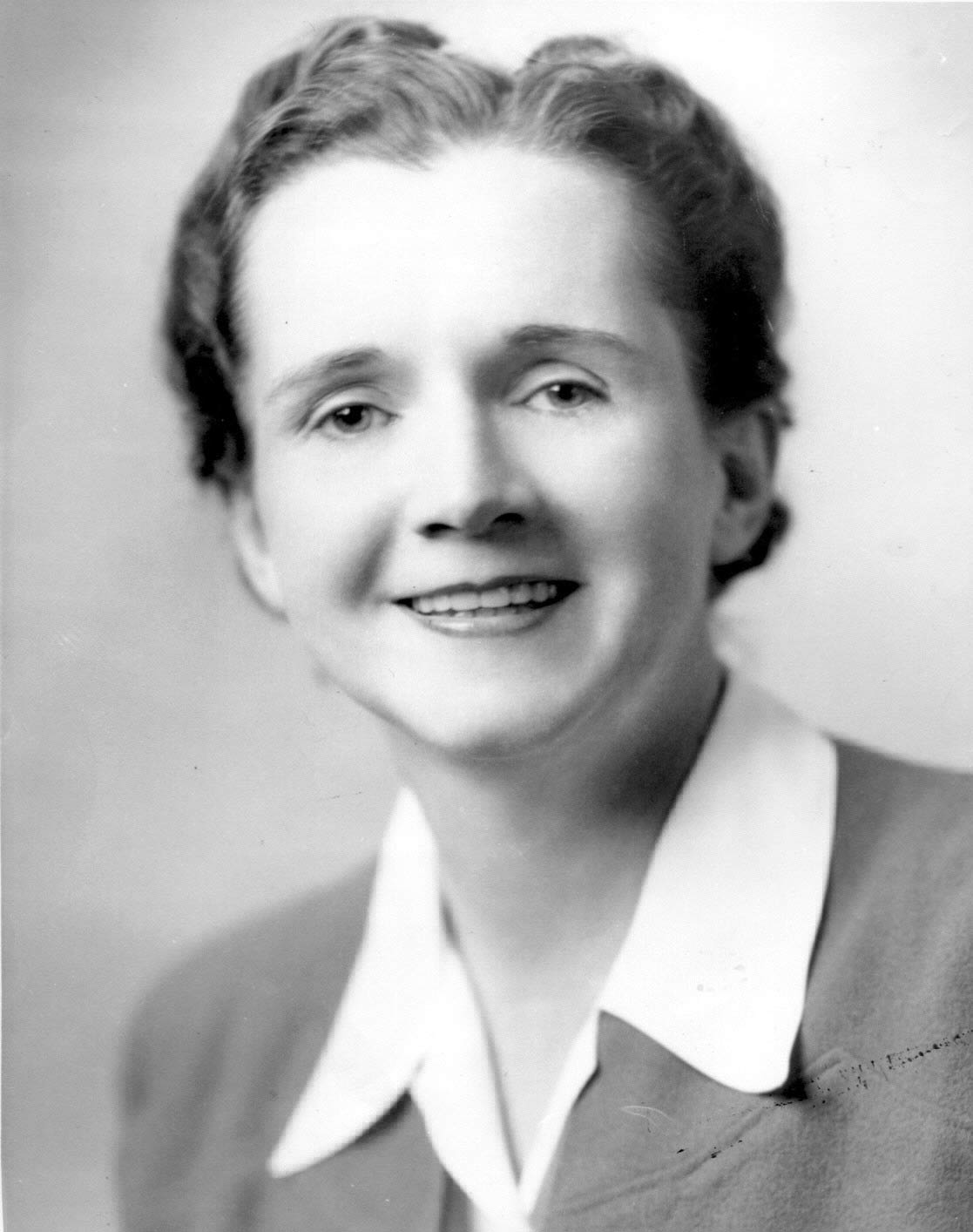
- Carson c.1940
- Awarded for: Women in conservation and the environmental movement
- Country: USA
- Presented by: National Audubon Society
- First award: 2004; 22 years ago
- Website: Official website

The Rachel Carson Award is awarded each spring by the National Audubon Society's Women in Conservation to recognize "women whose immense talent, expertise, and energy greatly advance conservation and the environmental movement locally and globally". Honorees are drawn from diverse backgrounds, including the worlds of journalism, academics, business, science, entertainment, philanthropy and law.

== Background ==
The award is named in honor of Rachel Carson, the undisputed founder of the modern environmental movement. Each year the Rachel Carson Award is created by Tiffany & Company. The Rachel Carson Awards Council was founded by Allison Whipple Rockefeller in 2004.

The award is presented to honorees each May at the Rachel Carson Award Luncheon, held annually at New York City's Plaza Hotel. Proceeds from the luncheon support Audubon's Long Island Sound Campaign, the Sound having undergone unprecedented pollution, habitat loss, and ecosystem disruption in recent years.

Audubon's Women in Conservation Program, in conjunction with Audubon's Rachel Carson Awards Council, supports a website which connects women to leaders in the environmental movement and to pressing environmental issues. Audubon's Women in Conservation also supports an internship program and hosts an educational school panel in which past Rachel Carson Award honorees speak at a local all-girls school.

== Award recipients ==
=== 2004 to 2009 ===
Year	Name	Role
2004	Jayni Chase	Environmental activist, philanthropist
2004	Lynn Chase	Wildlife artist, philanthropist
2004	Maria Rodale	Rodale Publishing, chairman
2004	Peggy M. Shepard	West Harlem Environmental Action, Inc. executive director
2004	Alice Waters	Chef, author, restaurateur
2005	Kay Kelley Arnold	Entergy Corporation, vice president of public affairs
2005	Bernadette Castro	New York State Parks, recreation and historic preservation, former commissioner
2005	Mae Jemison	BioSentient Corporation, founder
2005	Margaret Wittenberg	Whole Foods Market, vice president of global communications and quality standards
2006	Kathleen Bader	NatureWorks LLC, former president and CEO
2006	Margie Ruddick	Environmental designer, founder of Margie Ruddick Landscape
2007	Frances Beinecke	President of the National Resources Defense Council (NRDC)
2007	Majora Carter	Sustainable South Bronx, founder and executive director
2007	Laurie David	Global warming activist, producer, author
2007	Deirdre Imus	Deirdre Imus Environmental Center for Pediatric Oncology, founder and president
2008	Jean Clark, Norma Dana, Marguerite Purnell, Phyllis Cerf Wagner, and Elizabeth Barlow Rogers	Central Park Conservancy
2008	Teresa Heinz Kerry	Philanthropist
2008	Bette Midler	New York Restoration Project, founder
2009	Dr. Sylvia Earle	National Geographic 'Explorer in Residence'; Deep Search Foundation, founder
2009	Sally Jewell	Secretary of the Interior
2009	Elizabeth Cushman Titus Putnam	Student Conservation Association, founding president
2009	Elizabeth Colleton, Jane Evans and Susan Haspel	NBC Universal's Green is Universal Initiative

=== 2010 to 2019 ===
Year	Name	Role
2010	Suzanne Lewis	Yellowstone National Park, superintendent
2010	Isabella Rossellini	Actress, director, writer and environmental activist
2010	Dr. Beth Stevens	Disney World Wide Services, Environmental Affairs, senior vice president
2010	Fernanda M. Kellogg	Tiffany & Co. Foundation, president
2011	Maya Lin	Artist, architect and environmentalist
2011	Sigourney Weaver	Actress and environmental activist
2012	Sally Bingham	The Regeneration Project/Interfaith Power and Light, president
2012	L. Hunter Lovins	Natural Capitalism Solutions, president
2012	Janette Sadik-Khan	New York City Department of Transportation, commissioner
2013	Marian Heiskell	Conservationist and philanthropist
2013	Lady Bird Johnson	First Lady and environmental pioneer
2014	Ellen Futter	American Museum of Natural History, president
2014	Kaiulani Lee	"A Sense of Wonder" playwright and performer
2014	Nell Newman	Newman’s Own Organics, co-founder and president
2015	Warrie Price	Battery Park Conservancy, president and founder
2015	Flo Stone	Environmental Film Festival in the Nation's Capital, president and founder
2016	Dominique Browning	Moms Clean Air Force, co-founder and director
2016	Rebecca Moore	Google Earth Outreach, founder and director
2016	Dr. Kathryn Sullivan	Oceans and Atmosphere, under secretary of commerce; National Oceanic and Atmospheric Administration, administrator
2017	Jamie Rappaport Clark	Defenders of Wildlife, president and CEO
2017	Dr Heidi Cullen	Climate Central, chief scientist
2017	Anne Thompson	NBC News, chief environmental affairs correspondent
2018	Gina McCarthy	Public Health Practice, Harvard T.H. Chan School of Public Health, former EPA administrator and professor
2018	Mary Powell	Vermont Green Mountain Power, president and CEO
2018	Dorceta Taylor	University of Michigan School for Environment and Sustainability, director of diversity, equity and inclusion and James E. Crowfoot collegiate professor
2019	Rose H. Harvey	
2019	Garden Club of America	

=== 2020 onwards ===
Year	Name	Role
2021	Lisa P. Jackson	Apple, Environment, policy, and social initiatives, vice president
2021	Fern Shepard,	Rachel's Network, president
2021	Kristine McDivitt Tompkins	Tompkins Conservation, co-founder and president
2022	Abigail Dillen	Earthjustice, president
2023	Susanne Durst	McEnroe Organic Farm
2023	Kathleen Finlay	Glynwood Center for Regional Food and Farming, president; Pleiades, founder
2023	Laura O'Donohue	Snow Hill Farm, founder and CEO

== See also ==
- List of environmental awards
