= All in My Family =

2019 documentary film

- Film poster
- Directed by: Hao Wu
- Written by: Hao Wu
- Distributed by: Netflix
- Release date: May 3, 2019
- Running time: 39 minutes
- Country: United States

All in My Family is a 2019 American short documentary film directed by Hao Wu. The film follows a traditional heterosexual family where the son is a gay Chinese man who has chosen to have children via surrogates with their same-sex partner, Eric. This documentary provides raw footage between Hao and their family's reaction to their sexual orientation, reckoning of kinship, and parenthood. The documentary highlights the obstacles that come with traditional cultural practices for minority LGBTQ-identifying people who struggle to find a way to express themselves and start a family.

The documentary was released on Netflix on May 3, 2019.

== Reception ==
All in My Family received positive attention for its intimate and raw portrayal of a non-traditional family dynamic. Critics praised director Hao Wu for his vulnerability in documenting the clash between traditional Chinese cultural expectations and his life as a gay man with a same-sex partner and children. Reviews highlighted the film's emotional depth, noting that it effectively captures the universal struggles of acceptance, kinship, and parenthood within a modern LGBTQ+ context.
