= 76 Days =

2020 documentary film by Hao Wu and Weixi Chen

- Official release poster
- Directed by: Hao Wu; Weixi Chen; Anonymous
- Written by: Hao Wu
- Produced by: Hao Wu; Jean Tsien
- Cinematography: Chen Weixi; Anonymous
- Edited by: Hao Wu
- Production companies: 76 Days LLC; Ford Foundation; XTR; Sundance Institute
- Distributed by: MTV Documentary Films
- Release dates: September 14, 2020 (TIFF); December 4, 2020 (United States)
- Running time: 93 minutes
- Countries: United States; China
- Language: Mandarin

76 Days (Chinese: 76天; pinyin: 76 Tiān) is a 2020 Chinese-American documentary film directed by Hao Wu, Weixi Chen and an anonymous third. Set in the early days of the COVID-19 pandemic, it captures the struggles and human resilience in the battle to survive the spread of the disease in Wuhan, China.

It had its world premiere at the Toronto International Film Festival on September 14, 2020, to critical acclaim. It was released in the United States on December 4, 2020, by MTV Documentary Films. It was shortlisted for the 93rd Academy Awards in the Documentary Feature category. The film won a 2021 Primetime Creative Arts Emmy Award for Exceptional Merit in Documentary Filmmaking, becoming the first Emmy win for the Pluto TV network, which aired the film in late 2020.

== Production ==
Production started in Wuhan in February 2020, soon after the lockdown began in the city at four different hospitals. It continued through the gradual return of order and ended after the lockdown was officially lifted on April 8.

During the lockdown, access to hospitals was restricted to only patients, medical professionals and reporters. A few of the hardest-hit hospitals only allowed reporters and filming crews thoroughly vetted by the authorities. However, strict controls were not applied uniformly to all hospitals or throughout the entire lockdown period. Early in the lockdown when the situation was dire and chaotic and there was a severe shortage of medical supplies, many hospitals actually welcomed media exposure to help them look for help. Some of the medical teams sent from elsewhere in China to support Wuhan were also open to being filmed, partly due to their desire to have their own images documented in this historical moment.

As the producer and director, Wu found his two co-directors in mid-February while researching a pandemic film for a U.S. network. Both had started filming within Wuhan in early February. They collaborated by sharing daily rushes and discussing filming strategies online. By late March, however, the media environment in China over COVID-19 narratives was severely tightened due to increasing geo-political tension, so the two of them decided to stop collaborating with Wu. He then began editing the co-directors’ footage while under quarantine in Atlanta and after the U.S. network had dropped the project he had been developing. Wu approached the two of them once he had completed a rough cut. They eventually agreed to collaborate with him to complete the film.

Just like the healthcare workers in this film, the co-directors Chen Weixi and Anonymous had to put on personal protective equipment every day, which was very uncomfortable to wear, was hard to breathe in and made them feel sick at times. Once they were in the contamination zone, they had to stay there for hours at a time, with no bathroom breaks, just like the doctors and nurses. Every night after filming they would go through a thorough disinfection ritual and go back to rest alone in hotels reserved for front-line workers. They described their existence during the lockdown as an exhausting one, both physically and emotionally.

== Release ==
The film had its world premiere at the Toronto International Film Festival on September 14, 2020. Shortly after, MTV Documentary Films acquired U.S. distribution rights to the film. It also screened at the AFI Fest on October 16, 2020, and was the opening night film for the Double Exposure Film festival on October 14, 2020. It was released in the United States on December 4, 2020.

== Reception ==
On the review aggregator website Rotten Tomatoes, the film holds an approval rating of 100%, based on 98 reviews, with an average rating of 8.1/10. The website's consensus reads, "A raw, fly-on-the-wall recounting of hospital life in Wuhan in the early days of the COVID-19 pandemic, 76 Days is an engrossing and potent documentary—and a surprisingly comforting portrait of humanity." On Metacritic, the film has a weighted average score of 84 out of 100, based on 23 critics, indicating "universal acclaim".

=== Accolades ===
- 2020 Peabody Award
- 2021 Primetime Creative Arts Emmy Award
