= Almir Narayamoga Suruí =

Brazilian and Suruí environmental and indigenous activist

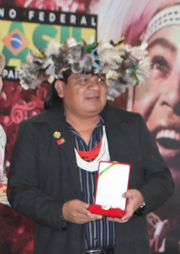
- Suruí in 2012
- Born: 1972 (age 53–54) pt:Terra Indígena Sete de Setembro, Rondonia, Brazil
- Education: Federal University of Goiás (BS)
- Occupations: Indigenous activist; Environmental activist
- Organization: Chief of the Suruí
- Awards: United Nations Forest Hero 2013

Almir Narayamoga Suruí is a Brazilian and Surui chief, indigenous activist, and environmental activist. He was the first Surui person to earn a college degree. He rose to international attention for his collaborations with Google Earth and later for his help creating the Surui Forest Carbon Project, shifting the tribe's main source of income to carbon credits.

== Biography ==
He was born and raised in the Seventh of September, the Surui indigenous lands, and assumed the position of chief of the Surui in 1992 at the age of 18. He became the first Surui person to earn a college degree when he attended the Federal University of Goiás for his Bachelors of Biology. He later worked at an internet cafe.

During his time at the internet cafe, he stumbled upon Google Earth and soon realized how helpful it could be in protecting Surui land. He met Rebecca Moore four years later and proposed a collaboration, where Surui got updated satellite information to help them learn about potential problems and learned how to use map tools and Google Earth would get help in learning about Surui and indigenous cultures and lands. This collaboration was ultimately implemented.

He also helped create the Surui Forest Carbon Project, where the Surui main source of income would shift from logging to carbon offsets and credits from "mitigated destruction", a new method for carbon credits. These credits were purchased by organizations such as Natura &Co and the 2014 FIFA World Cup. However, due to a small faction of Surui choosing to log and mine and state and federal authorities allegedly not preventing it, the project eventually collapsed.

In 2007, a group of loggers attempted to pay $100,000 for his death. He later had to go into hiding in 2011.

He was given the Human Rights Prize by the International Society for Human Rights in 2008, was ranked as the 53rd Most Creative Person in Business in 2011, and was awarded the United Nations Forest Hero award in 2013.

He wrote the book "Save our Planet", which was published in 2018. He ran for Congress in the 2022 Brazilian general election, but did not win a seat.

His daughter is activist Txai Suruí.
