= Ellen V. Futter =

American museum administrator (born 1949)

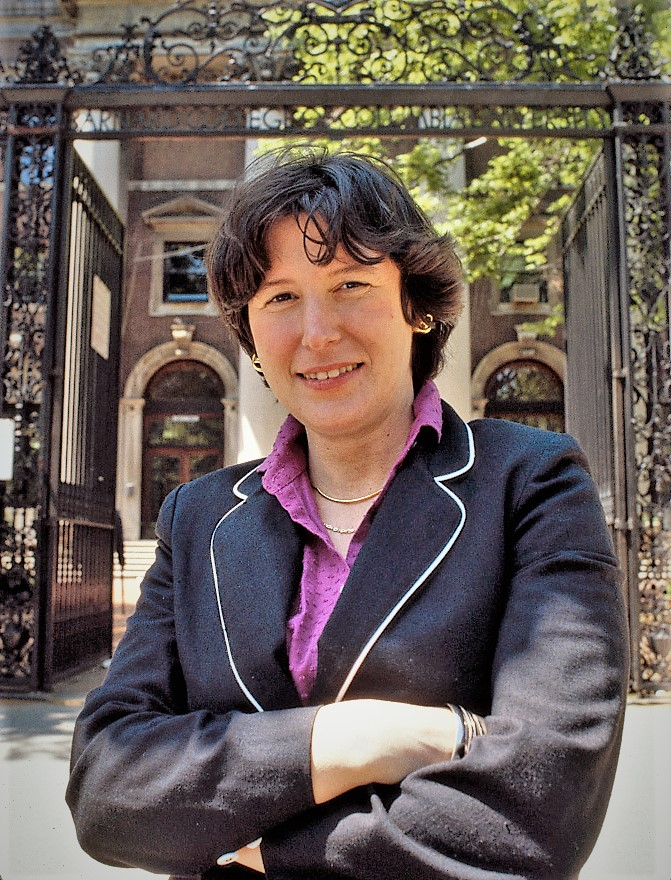
Futter as President of Barnard College, in front of college gate, 1984

Ellen Victoria Futter (born September 21, 1949) is the former president of the American Museum of Natural History (1993–2023). She previously served as president of Barnard College for 13 years.

== Biography ==
Futter was born in New York City and attended high school in Port Washington, New York. Her father, Victor Futter, was an attorney who served as VP and secretary of Allied Corporation, law professor at the Hofstra University Law School, and general counsel of Fairleigh Dickinson University.

She spent two years at the University of Wisconsin–Madison before transferring to Barnard College, where she graduated Phi Beta Kappa magna cum laude in 1971. She was elected as a student representative to the Barnard's board of trustees in 1971 and was subsequently elected to full membership to complete the term of Arthur Goldberg, former Associate Justice of the Supreme Court of the United States. Futter earned her J.D. from Columbia Law School in 1974.

Futter began her career as an associate at the Wall Street law firm of Milbank, Tweed, Hadley & McCloy, where she practiced corporate law. In 1980, Futter took a leave of absence from Milbank, Tweed to serve as Barnard's acting president for one year. At the end of that period, she was appointed president of the college; at the time, she was the youngest president of any college in the United States. She served as president until 1993, when she joined the American Museum of Natural History.

In 2014, Futter received the prestigious Rachel Carson Award from The National Audubon Society for her environmental leadership at the Museum. In June 2022, Futter announced that she plans to step down as president of the American Museum of National History in March 2023, when the new Gilder Center opens. Futter was succeeded as president of the American Museum of Natural History by Sean Decatur in April, 2023.

Futter is a director of a number of corporations and not-for-profit organizations. She is a Fellow of the American Academy of Arts and Sciences, National Institute of Social Sciences, the Academy of American Poets, the Association of the Bar of the City of New York, the New York State Bar Association, the American Bar Association, and is also a member of the American Philosophical Society.

She formerly served as chairman of the board of the Federal Reserve Bank of New York and chairman of the Commission on Women's Health of The Commonwealth Fund. She has received numerous honorary degrees, including from Yale University. She is director of JPMorgan Chase, director of Consolidated Edison, a member of the Council on Foreign Relations, and on the board of trustees of Memorial Sloan Kettering Cancer Center.

== JPMorgan directorship ==
In 2012, Futter came under criticism as one of the three members of JPMorgan Chase's Risk committee after the bank has been under siege since CEO Jamie Dimon said May 10 that the firm’s chief investment office suffered a $2 billion loss trading credit derivatives. Futter headed the audit committee of Bristol-Myers, a New York-based drugmaker, during an accounting scandal that began in 1999 and that the company settled for $300 million to avoid criminal prosecution. She also served on AIG’s compliance and governance committees, resigning in July 2008 before the insurer took a $182.3 billion bailout from the U.S. government.

Cultural offices
Preceded by George D. Langdon Jr.	President of the American Museum of Natural History; 1993–present	Succeeded by Incumbent
