= Divide and Conquer: The Story of Roger Ailes =

- Theatrical release poster
- Directed by: Alexis Bloom
- Produced by: Alexis Bloom; Will Cohen
- Cinematography: Charlotte Kaufman; Antonio Rossi
- Edited by: Pax Wassermann
- Music by: Will Bates
- Production companies: A&E IndieFilms; Impact Partners; Jigsaw Productions; Baird Films
- Distributed by: Magnolia Pictures
- Release dates: September 9, 2018 (TIFF); December 7, 2018 (United States)
- Running time: 107 minutes
- Country: United States
- Language: English
- Box office: $38,510

Divide and Conquer: The Story of Roger Ailes is a 2018 American documentary film, directed and produced by Alexis Bloom. It follows the rise and fall of conservative media mogul Roger Ailes. Alex Gibney serves as an executive producer under his Jigsaw Productions banner.

The film had its world premiere at the Toronto International Film Festival on September 9, 2018. It was released on December 7, 2018, by Magnolia Pictures. The film was nominated for the Primetime Emmy Award for Exceptional Merit in Documentary Filmmaking.

== Synopsis ==
The film follows the rise and fall of conservative media mogul Roger Ailes as he launches Fox News, and is subsequently accused of sexual harassment by multiple women. Austin Pendleton, E. Jean Carroll, Alisyn Camerota, Glenn Beck, Anna Saunders, Chris Thorn, among others appear in the film.

== Release ==
The film had its world premiere at the Toronto International Film Festival on September 9, 2018. Prior to this, Magnolia Pictures acquired U.S. distribution rights. The film also went on screen at the New York Film Festival on October 3, 2018, and the AFI Fest on November 11, 2018. It was released in the United States on December 7, 2018.

The film had its television premiere on A&E on March 3, 2019. It received an Primetime Emmy Award for Exceptional Merit in Documentary Filmmaking nomination.

=== Critical reception ===
Divide and Conquer: The Roger Ailes Story received positive reviews from film critics. It holds a 90% approval rating on review aggregator website Rotten Tomatoes, based on 51 reviews, with an average of 7/10. The site's critical consensus reads, "Divide & Conquer: The Story of Roger Ailes offers an overview of the media mogul's rise and fall that proves as engrossing as it is deeply disturbing." On Metacritic, the film holds a rating of 71 out of 100, based on 18 critics, indicating "generally favorable" reviews.
