= The Bibi Files =

2024 documentary film by Alexis Bloom

- Official poster
- Directed by: Alexis Bloom
- Produced by: Alexis Bloom; Alex Gibney; Raviv Drucker; Kara Elverson; David Rahtz
- Cinematography: Avner Shahaf
- Edited by: Andy Grieve; Halil Efrat
- Music by: Will Bates
- Production companies: Jigsaw Productions; Drucker & Goren Media
- Distributed by: Against Gravity; Dogwoof; Dulac Distribution; Filmin; Front Row Filmed Entertainment; Jolt Film; Madman Entertainment; PT Falcon; September Film; Teleview
- Release date: November 14, 2024 (Doc NYC)
- Running time: 113 minutes
- Country: United States
- Languages: English; Hebrew; Arabic

The Bibi Files is a 2024 American documentary film directed by Alexis Bloom. The film features leaked interrogation footage from the trial of Benjamin Netanyahu. It was screened as a work-in-progress film at the 2024 Toronto International Film Festival, and had its official world premiere at Doc NYC on November 14, 2024. It was later released on direct-to-consumer film platform Jolt in the United States on December 11, 2024.

== Background ==
As part of the investigation into bribery and fraud allegations against Prime Minister Benjamin Netanyahu, Israeli police recorded thousands of hours of interrogation footage from 2016 to 2018. This footage was leaked to filmmaker Alex Gibney via Signal in early 2023. In addition to Netanyahu, the film features video footage of his family, friends, and associates. It also includes interviews with insiders who were willing to speak on the record about Netanyahu.

While the interrogation audio had been previously published, the video footage had not been. Gibney stated, "These recordings shed light on Netanyahu's character in a way that is unprecedented and extraordinary. They are powerful evidence of his venal and corrupt character and how that led us to where we are at right now."

== Synopsis ==
Benjamin Netanyahu, facing allegations of bribery and corruption, is being interrogated by Israeli police. Netanyahu is defensive, calling the interrogators' questions "delusional" and the investigation "preposterous and insane".

Insiders, including investigative journalist Raviv Drucker, believe that the 2018–2022 Israeli political crisis was a direct result of Netanyahu's efforts to avoid prosecution. They also claim that Netanyahu is using the Gaza war as an instrument to further delay his trial. Drucker is very familiar with Netanyahu, having published several investigative reports on Netanyahu in the years leading up to the documentary. Despite decades of corruption allegations, Drucker notes that Netanyahu has never faced prosecution.

Hundreds of witnesses are interrogated throughout the course of the investigation. They state that Netanyahu and his wife, Sara, had been steadily receiving expensive gifts, including jewelry, cigars, and champagne, from wealthy businesspeople, including Arnon Milchan, Sheldon Adelson, and Miriam Adelson. Hadas Klein, Milchan's former assistant, alleges that the gifts were demanded by the Netanyahus like "a supplyment [sic] line". To hide the inflow of gifts, they communicated in code and concealed items in bags and coolers. Netanyahu vehemently denies soliciting any gifts.

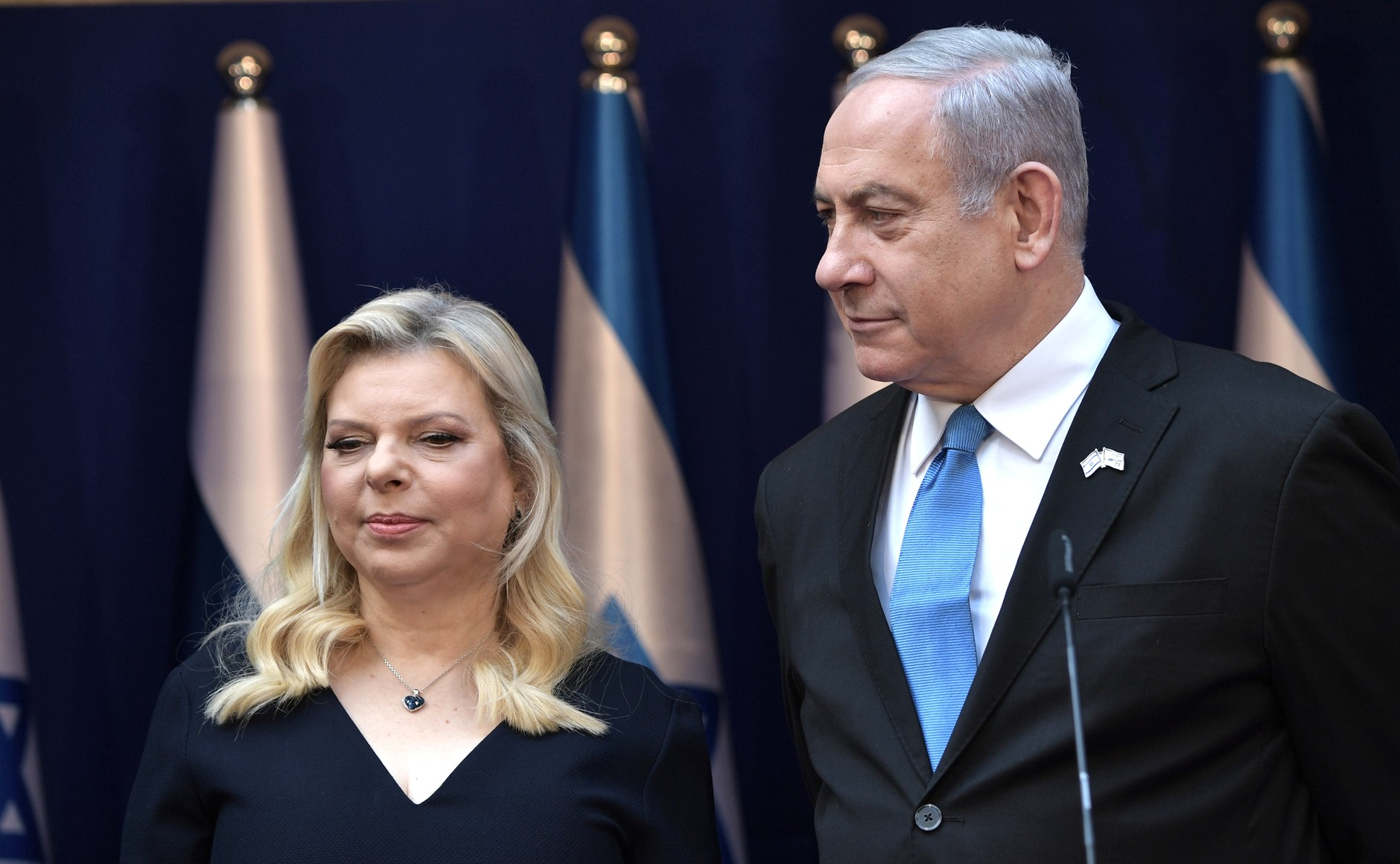
Sara and Benjamin Netanyahu in 2020

Sara Netanyahu is hostile and combative during her interrogation, accusing the police of trying to bring down her husband. Insiders state that Sara is controlling and heavily involved in political matters and decision-making under her husband's premiership. Household workers at Beit Aghion also state that Sara created a hostile work environment for them, with a former housekeeper claiming that she expected the same level of luxury as the White House. Insiders speculate that Netanyahu fears his wife, regularly appeasing her wishes since his 1993 sex tape scandal.

Yair Lapid, former Minister of Finance, states that Netanyahu, at the request of Milchan, personally advocated for the extension of a tax exemption that solely benefited Milchan's financial interests. The exemption was marginal, only applying to a few individuals, and Lapid states that it was the only tax regulation that Netanyahu had ever approached him about. In addition to the tax exemption, Klein states that Netanyahu, at Milchan's request, personally contacted U.S. Secretary of State John Kerry and Ambassador Daniel B. Shapiro to reinstate Milchan's U.S. visa.

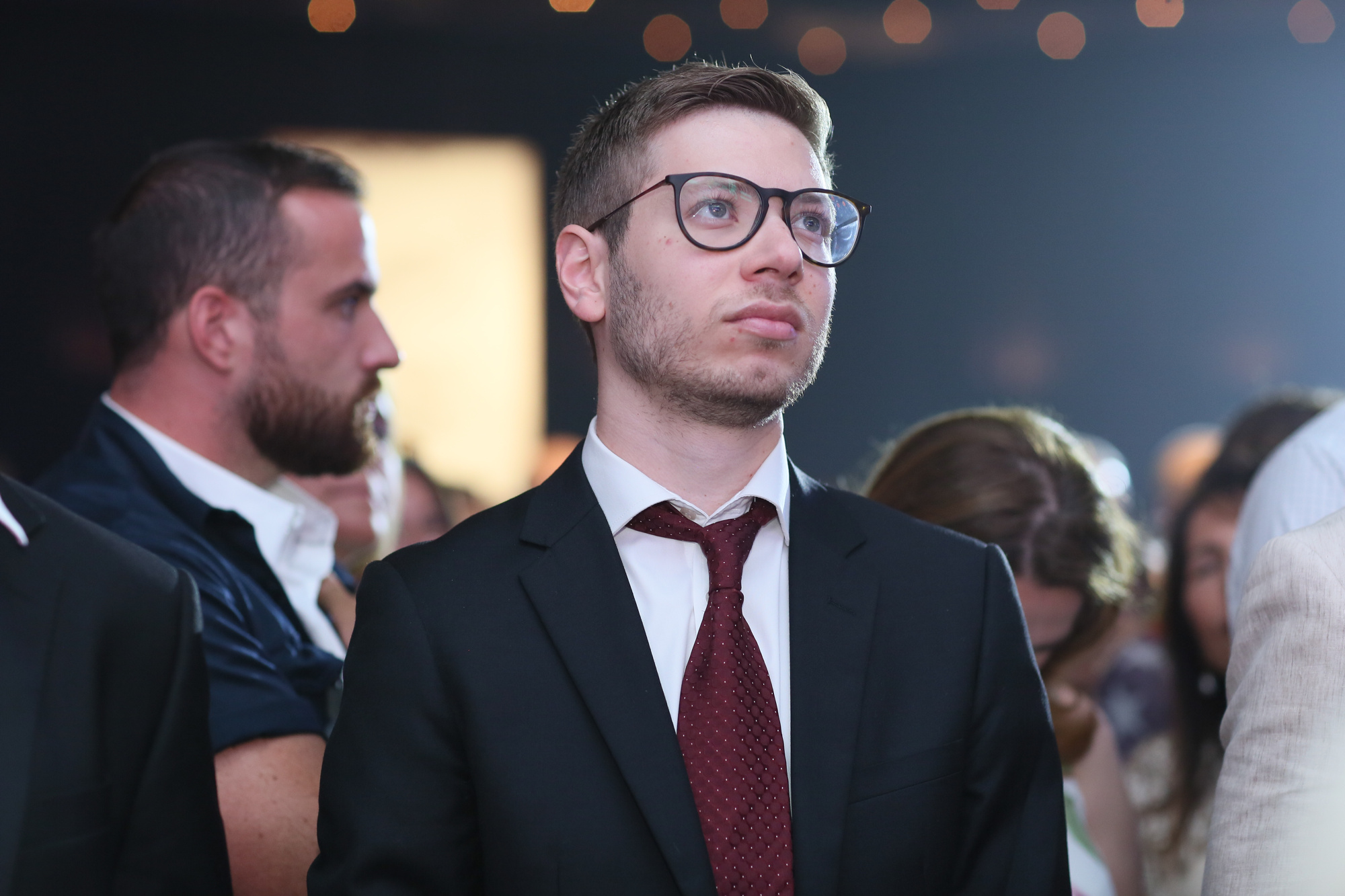
Yair Netanyahu in 2019

In a second case in Netanyahu's trial, Nir Hefetz, Netanyahu's former spokesperson, states that Netanyahu gave Shaul Elovitch access to funds to repay a loan in exchange for favorable coverage on Elovitch's news website, Walla! News. Hefetz also states that Yair Netanyahu, Benjamin Netanyahu's son, known for his strict right-wing views, also had influence on Walla's content. In his interrogation, Yair is uncooperative, comparing the Israeli police to the Stasi and Gestapo, and calling the investigation a "witch hunt".

After Netanyahu's indictment in November 2019, he denies the charges and refuses to resign. To maintain his political power, he begins to appeal to the far-right and religious factions, later appointing ultra-nationalists Bezalel Smotrich and Itamar Ben-Gvir to his cabinet. In January 2023, Netanyahu promotes a judicial reform plan to limit the power of the Supreme Court, sparking nine months of widespread protests across Israel. Insiders state that Netanyahu backed the reform plan in an attempt to block his trial, willingly destabilizing and undermining the security of the country in order to evade a jail sentence.

Footage from the October 7 attacks is shown. Insiders believe Netanyahu to be indirectly responsible for the attacks, having empowered Hamas in Gaza for years to weaken the Palestinian Authority in the West Bank and believing that "we control the height of the flames". He quotes The Godfather Part II to the interrogators, stating, "Keep your friends close, keep your enemies closer." Insiders believe that the anti-Arab far-right has an incentive to prolong the Gaza war in order to achieve their goals in Gaza and Southern Lebanon, rather than prioritizing the hostage crisis and reaching a ceasefire. In turn, Netanyahu repeatedly requests his corruption trial to be delayed, citing the ongoing war.

== Production ==
After receiving over 1,000 hours of leaked trial interrogation footage, producer Alex Gibney approached director Alexis Bloom to make a documentary film together; they had been working on the film prior to the October 7 attacks in 2023. Bloom noted that she interviewed many individuals, including former chiefs of staff, heads of Shin Bet, and other senior officials, who were willing to speak with her about Netanyahu, but only off the record. One compared Netanyahu's premiership to the Netflix television series House of Cards. Bloom stated, "Honestly, these stories about Netanyahu are fairly well known in Israel. So many Israelis along the way have said to me, 'You need to get this out to the wider world'."

== Release ==
On September 2, 2024, the film was added to the 2024 Toronto International Film Festival (TIFF) lineup as a work-in-progress film, three weeks after the full festival schedule had been released. Goodfellas acquired the sales rights on September 6, and it was screened at TIFF on September 9 and 10. It was also screened at the 2024 Woodstock Film Festival.

The film initially struggled to secure a distributor due to its controversial nature. However, in October 2024, it was acquired for distribution by September Film in Belgium, the Netherlands, and Luxembourg; Dulac Distribution in France; Against Gravity in Poland; Filmin in Spain; Dogwoof in the United Kingdom; Madman Entertainment in Australia and New Zealand; PT Falcon in Indonesia; and Teleview in the Middle East and Turkey.

The film had its official world premiere at Doc NYC on November 14, 2024. The following day, on November 15, it began a limited theatrical run at the Laemmle Monica Center in Santa Monica, California. It was made available to stream on direct-to-consumer film platform Jolt in the United States on December 11, 2024. As of March 2025, the film has not yet secured a U.S. distributor.

The film is banned in Israel due to privacy laws. Regarding its distribution, Gibney stated, "There's a legal restriction at the moment in Israel, by agreement with the source. Everywhere else in the world, there's no restriction. So, we plan to distribute it as widely as possible and still stay within the bounds of our promise, or my promise, to the source." Despite its legal status, it has been widely pirated and distributed in Israel.

=== Netanyahu response ===
On September 8, 2024, one day before the film's TIFF screening, lawyers representing Netanyahu petitioned the Jerusalem District Court for an injunction against Raviv Drucker, one of the film's producers, for publishing footage from a police interrogation without the court's permission. Judge Oded Shaham denied the request on September 9, and the film was screened at TIFF later that day. On September 17, 2024, lawyers representing Netanyahu petitioned Israel's Attorney General, Gali Baharav-Miara, and Police Commissioner, Daniel Levy, to open an investigation into Drucker. They also requested a gag order to be placed on the leaked trial footage.

== Reception ==
On the review aggregator website Rotten Tomatoes, 95% of 19 critics' reviews are positive. Metacritic, which uses a weighted average, assigned the film a score of 73 out of 100, based on 7 critics, indicating "generally favorable" reviews.

Reviewing the film after its TIFF screening, Jason Gorber of Collider rated the film 7 out of 10, calling it a "timely documentary [that] showcases the worst of political power" and "a powerful presentation of the facts without ever devolving into being a mere polemic." He noted the film's lack of new information for most Israeli people, but wrote that "seeing Bibi, his wife, his [son] and others raging against the investigation rather than simply perusing transcripts is a more powerful medium" than simply reading the transcripts of the interrogation. He commented that the film's score felt overwhelming at times and that some of its edits "[got] in the way of the simple facts of the matter being discussed," but commended the film for combining multiple storylines "into a coherent whole." Ofer Matan of Haaretz called the connection between Netanyahu's trial and the Gaza war "perhaps the film's greatest achievement." He further wrote, "This connection is almost intuitive for Israelis who oppose Netanyahu and protest against him and his government, but it's not obvious, or sometimes even known, to international audiences, including Jewish ones."

Upon the film's official premiere at Doc NYC, Frank Scheck of The Hollywood Reporter called it "a revealing look at the machinations of power" that "paints a damning portrait of arrogance." He noted that critics of Netanyahu would likely be disappointed by the film's lack of new information, but wrote, "Nonetheless, they'll find much to feast on." In addition to the "juicy" interrogation footage of Sara and Yair Netanyahu, Scheck noted the film's inclusion of "incisive and frequently damning commentary" from Nir Hefetz, Ehud Olmert, and Ami Ayalon. He called the testimony of Gili Schwartz, a survivor of the Be'eri massacre, "moving" and "a welcome positive note from a film in which there's plenty of ugliness on display."

Peter Bradshaw of The Guardian rated the film four stars out of five, calling the leaked interrogation footage "extraordinary" and writing, "The film's real power is in the accumulated testimony from others about the Netanyahus' entitlement and paranoia." Tara Brady of The Irish Times also rated the film four stars out of five, calling it a "scathing portrait of Binyamin Netanyahu's alleged history of backhanders." Ben Kenigsberg of The New York Times wrote that the film "takes a thorough, methodical approach to laying out the case against Netanyahu, even if few of its arguments are new." He called the statements of Drucker and Uzi Beller, Netanyahu's childhood friend, "the most potent", but felt that the film's characterization of Sara Netanyahu as "a kind of Lady Macbeth figure" could create excuses for Netanyahu and distance him from accountability.

Some critiques highlighted perceived partisanship, arguing the film selectively frames Netanyahu's actions without broader contextual balance on Israel's challenges. Middle East Eye characterized it as a "liberal Zionist effort" targeting Netanyahu personally rather than systemic issues. Critics aligned with Netanyahu, contend that the documentary selectively emphasizes incriminating moments while omitting context from defense arguments, potentially misleading viewers on the full evidentiary picture. Legal experts and reviewers note that while the footage offers unprecedented insight into the probes, it does not independently establish corruption beyond what courts will adjudicate, as trials remain pending and include cross-examinations not featured in the film. Wendy Ide of The Guardian highlighted the material's authenticity but cautioned that its interpretive framing amplifies prosecution angles without equivalent defense rebuttals. The overall consensus positions the documentary as a compelling journalistic endeavor on the allegations' veracity, though its one-sided emphasis invites debates over objectivity versus advocacy.

=== Accolades ===
Award	Year	Category	Result	Ref.
Cinema for Peace Awards	2025	Political Film of the Year	Won	
International Film Festival and Forum on Human Rights	2025	Vision for Human Rights Award	Nominated	
News and Documentary Emmy Awards	2025	Outstanding Research: Documentary	Nominated	
