= Frank C. Moore (painter) =

American painter

- Born: June 22, 1953; Manhattan, New York
- Died: April 21, 2002 (aged 48)
- Education: Yale
- Style: Surrealism

Frank C. Moore II (June 22, 1953 – April 21, 2002) was a New York-based painter, winner of the Logan Medal of the Arts, and a member of the Visual AIDS Artists Caucus—the organization responsible for the (Red) Ribbon Project, A Day Without Art, and A Night Without Light.

Moore's father, Earle K. Moore, was a communications and civil rights lawyer in Manhattan, who won a landmark case establishing that broadcast stations must serve the interests of their viewers. His sister, Rebecca Moore, would later become a computer scientist, environmentalist, and founder of Google Earth Outreach. Frank Moore was born in Manhattan in 1953, then moved with his family to Long Island, N.Y., first to Great Neck, and then to Roslyn, where he first attended Roslyn Junior High School. He graduated from Roslyn High School in 1971, where he had been active in student politics and served as class president. Moore's work was selected for display for years in the high school halls. They were eventually removed during a renovation and subsequently lost.

He attended Yale, where he graduated summa cum laude in 1975, and he studied at the Cité internationale des arts in Paris from 1977 to 1979. His art began appearing in group exhibitions in 1979, as he worked as a set designer for modern dance choreographer Jim Self in Manhattan.

Deeply indebted to Surrealism, Moore's paintings frequently depict dream scenarios and futuristic landscapes, often with environmental sub-texts (in a picture-postcard Niagara Falls, chemical signatures of pollutants drift in the mist), or references to AIDS (in Viral Romance, 1992, a reversed bouquet blooms human immunodeficiency virus). His political stance was broad and nuanced with homoerotic imagery. He died of AIDS on April 21, 2002, aged 48. Late in 2012, the double exhibition Toxic Beauty, comprising the most comprehensive review of Moore's work, was on view at New York University. His sister Rebecca Moore completed his work setting up the Gesso Foundation for artists after his death.

== Bibliography ==
- Frank Moore: Sperone Westwater, by Tom Breidenbach, Artforum, January 2004, pp. 154–155, 1 January 2004
- Frank Moore retrospective "Frank Moore", by Andrew Cornell Robinson Sperone Westwater Gallery, New York, New York, Gay City News, Volume 2, Issue 41 October 9–15, 2003.
- "Versace's Medusa: (Capita)lizing upon Classical Antiquity," by Michele Valerie Ronnick, Helios 32(2005) 173-181. (on Moore's 1997 painting "To Die For."
- Art frames puzzle of today's life, Orlando Sentinel, 14 June 2002, pp. E1, E3, 14 June 2002
- Art and AIDS, Orlando Weekly, 13 June 2002
- Frank Moore’s Dark Thoughts, by Roslyn Bernstein, Guernica Magazine, 26 November 2012.
- Frank Moore exhibit (2021) at the David Zwirner Gallery, curated by Hilton Als
