= Alexis Bloom =

South African director and producer (born 1974 or 1975)

- Bloom in 2026
- Born: Alexis Bloom; 1974 or 1975 (age 50–51); Johannesburg, South Africa
- Education: UC Berkeley Graduate School of Journalism
- Occupations: Film director; producer
- Years active: 2001–present
- Partner: Fisher Stevens
- Children: 2

Alexis Bloom (born 1974 or 1975) is a South African documentary film director and producer. Her works include Bright Lights: Starring Carrie Fisher and Debbie Reynolds (2016), Divide and Conquer: The Story of Roger Ailes (2018), and The Bibi Files (2024). She has been nominated for three Primetime Emmy Awards.

== Biography ==
Bloom was born in Johannesburg to a Jewish father and a German mother, and was raised Jewish. She moved to England in 1988. In 1999, she moved to the United States to attend the UC Berkeley Graduate School of Journalism, from which she graduated in 2001. She began her career editing for Frontline.

She is in a relationship with Fisher Stevens, with whom she has two children. As of 2024, she is based in Brooklyn.

== Filmography ==
=== Film ===
Year	Title	Director	Producer	Ref.
2013	We Steal Secrets: The Story of WikiLeaks	No	Yes	
2016	Bright Lights: Starring Carrie Fisher and Debbie Reynolds	Yes	Yes	
2018	Divide and Conquer: The Story of Roger Ailes	Yes	Yes	
2023	Catching Fire: The Story of Anita Pallenberg	Yes	Yes	
2024	The Bibi Files	Yes	Yes	

=== Television ===
Year	Title	Director	Producer	Notes	Ref.
2002–2007	Frontline/World	No	Yes	Also key correspondent; 10 episodes	
2010	Sound Tracks: Music Without Borders	No	No	Self; reporter	
2011	Nova ScienceNow	Yes	Yes	2 episodes	

== Awards and nominations ==
Award	Year	Category	Nominated work	Result	Ref.
Camden International Film Festival	2018	Best Documentary Feature	Divide and Conquer: The Story of Roger Ailes	Nominated	
Cannes Film Festival	2016	L'Œil d'or	Bright Lights: Starring Carrie Fisher and Debbie Reynolds	Nominated	
Cannes Film Festival	2023	L'Œil d'or	Catching Fire: The Story of Anita Pallenberg	Nominated	
Cinema Eye Honors	2018	Outstanding Achievement in Broadcast Nonfiction Filmmaking	Bright Lights: Starring Carrie Fisher and Debbie Reynolds	Nominated	
Cinema for Peace Awards	2025	Political Film of the Year	The Bibi Files	Won	
Docville	2019	ConScience Award	Divide and Conquer: The Story of Roger Ailes	Nominated	
Hamptons International Film Festival	2018	Best Documentary Feature	Divide and Conquer: The Story of Roger Ailes	Won	
Hot Springs Documentary Film Festival	2016	Audience Award	Bright Lights: Starring Carrie Fisher and Debbie Reynolds	Won	
International Film Festival and Forum on Human Rights	2025	Vision for Human Rights Award	The Bibi Files	Nominated	
News and Documentary Emmy Awards	2025	Outstanding Research: Documentary	The Bibi Files	Nominated	
Primetime Emmy Awards	2017	Exceptional Merit in Documentary Filmmaking	Bright Lights: Starring Carrie Fisher and Debbie Reynolds	Nominated	
Primetime Emmy Awards	2017	Outstanding Directing for a Documentary/Nonfiction Program	Bright Lights: Starring Carrie Fisher and Debbie Reynolds	Nominated	
Primetime Emmy Awards	2019	Exceptional Merit in Documentary Filmmaking	Divide and Conquer: The Story of Roger Ailes	Nominated	
Producers Guild of America Awards	2014	Outstanding Producer of Documentary Theatrical Motion Pictures	We Steal Secrets: The Story of WikiLeaks	Won	
