= Bright Lights: Starring Carrie Fisher and Debbie Reynolds =

Bright Lights
- Directed by: Alexis Bloom; Fisher Stevens
- Produced by: Alexis Bloom; Todd Fisher; Julie Nives
- Starring: Carrie Fisher; Debbie Reynolds; Todd Fisher; Griffin Dunne
- Cinematography: Vasco Nunes; Billy Peña
- Edited by: Penelope Falk; Sheila Shiraz
- Music by: Will Bates
- Production companies: Bloomfish Pictures; HBO Documentary Films; Insurgent Docs; RatPac Documentary Films
- Distributed by: HBO
- Release dates: May 14, 2016 (Cannes); January 7, 2017 (United States)
- Running time: 95 minutes
- Country: United States
- Language: English

Bright Lights: Starring Carrie Fisher and Debbie Reynolds (on-screen title is simply Bright Lights) is a 2016 documentary about the relationship between entertainer Debbie Reynolds (in her final film appearance) and her daughter, actress and writer Carrie Fisher. Following a premiere at the 2016 Cannes Film Festival, the film was broadcast January 7, 2017 on HBO.

== Production ==
Alexis Bloom and Fisher Stevens directed the film, while Brett Ratner and Sheila Nevins served as executive producers on the film under their RatPac Documentary Films and HBO Documentary Films banner. According to USA Today the film is "an intimate portrait of Hollywood royalty ... [it] loosely chronicles their lives through interviews, photos, footage and vintage home movies... It culminates in a moving scene, just as Reynolds is preparing to receive the 2015 Screen Actors Guild Life Achievement Award, which Fisher presented to her mother."

== Release ==
The film had its world premiere at the 2016 Cannes Film Festival on May 14, 2016. It was also screened at the Telluride Film Festival on September 3, 2016, and at the Hot Springs Documentary Film Festival on October 14, 2016. It went on to screen at the New York Film Festival on October 10, 2016 and the AFI Fest on November 13, 2016.

The deaths of both stars in December 2016 prompted changes to the HBO air date, initially scheduled for March 2017. Fisher went into cardiac arrest on December 23 and succumbed four days later on December 27, while Reynolds had a severe stroke and died the following day, December 28. HBO subsequently moved the broadcast to January 7, 2017.

== Reception ==
On Rotten Tomatoes the film has an approval rating of 100%, based on 57 reviews, with an average rating of 8.93/10. The website's critical consensus reads, "Bright Lights: Starring Carrie Fisher and Debbie Reynolds is a touching, bittersweet, and ultimately charming love story that serves as a poignantly effective tribute to the strangely complicated, uniquely resilient mother/daughter duo." On Metacritic, the film has a score of 85 out of 100, based on 25 reviews, indicating "universal acclaim".

David Rooney of The Hollywood Reporter gave the film a positive review, writing: "If the film is as disorderly in its structure as the messy family history it surveys, time spent with these wonderful subjects makes that seem sweetly appropriate." David Ehrlich of Indiewire gave the film a "B", writing: "On a similarly sweet note, Bright Lights outlines the mutual resentments between Fisher and Reynolds, but is also happy to let sleeping dogs lie. If anything, Stevens and Bloom are fascinated by how well-adjusted their relationship appears to be, mother and daughter living next door to each other without ever tipping into Grey Gardens territory. They’re still so close, despite everything between them." Fionnuala Halligan of Screen International also gave the film a positive review, writing: "This touching love story - with each other, the past, and the camera - has clear appeal, to 'Old Hollywood' fans, to Star Wars followers, to voyeurs in general."
