= The Territory (2022 film) =

- Theatrical release poster
- Directed by: Alex Pritz
- Produced by: Alex Pritz; Darren Aronofsky; Sigrid Dyekjaer; Will N. Miller; Gabriel Uchida; Lizzie Gillett
- Cinematography: Alex Pritz; Tangai Uru-eu-wau-wau
- Edited by: Carlos Rojas Felice
- Music by: Katya Mihailova
- Production companies: Protozoa Pictures; Passion Pictures; Real Lava; TIME Studios; XTR; Doc Society Climate Story Fund; Documist; Associação Jupaú
- Distributed by: National Geographic Documentary Films; Picturehouse (United States); Dogwoof (United Kingdom)
- Release dates: January 22, 2022 (Sundance); August 19, 2022 (United States); September 2, 2022 (United Kingdom)
- Running time: 85 minutes
- Countries: United States; United Kingdom; Brazil; Denmark
- Languages: Portuguese; Tupi-Kawahiva
- Box office: $70,093

The Territory is a 2022 internationally co-produced documentary film directed by Alex Pritz. It follows a young Indigenous leader of the Uru-eu-wau-wau people fighting back against farmers, colonizers and settlers who encroach on a protected area of the Amazon rainforest. Filmed on location in Brazil from 2018 to 2020, the film utilizes almost exclusively on-the-ground, primary source material, including footage produced directly by the Uru-eu-wau-wau. Darren Aronofsky serves as a producer under his Protozoa Pictures banner.

The film had its world premiere at the 2022 Sundance Film Festival on January 22, 2022. It was released in select cities in the United States and Canada on August 19, 2022, by National Geographic Documentary Films and Picturehouse. It was shortlisted for the 95th Academy Awards in the Best Documentary Feature category, and won Exceptional Merit In Documentary Filmmaking at the 75th Emmy Awards. The film received critical acclaim for its cinematography and for the authentic portrayal of rising tensions between Indigenous peoples and settlers in contemporary Brazil.

== Synopsis ==
The film focuses on the Uru-eu-wau-wau, an Amazonian tribe only contacted by the Brazilian government in 1980. Originally numbering in the thousands, the tribe is presented as just 200 strong at the film's outset. Bitaté Uru-eu-wau-wau is introduced as an 18-year-old who, despite his youth, is selected as leader of Uru-eu-wau-wau in order to coordinate their protection in the face of encroaching settlers who deploy slash-and-burn tactics to establish frontier settlements. Neidinha Bandeira, an environmental and human rights activist, is the other central cast member, working tirelessly to protect Uru-eu-wau-wau land and present their story to journalists and politicians. White seizure of Indigenous land is presented as a quasi-legal movement, tacitly encouraged after the election of reactionary populist Jair Bolsonaro.

The film interweaves vérité footage of settlers themselves who, though chauvinistic, also have genuine faith in their entitlement to Amazonian land. The threat of violence hangs over the film's action. Bandeira faces near-constant death threats and the tribe deals frankly with the threat of elimination. The murder of Ari Uru-eu-wau-wau, a 33-year-old tribal leader beloved by the Uru-eu-wau-wau, is presented around the film's mid-point; the primary coordinator of tribal patrols, Ari is found murdered on a roadside with his death unsolved at the film's conclusion. The Uru-eu-wau-wau are also hit hard by COVID-19, losing 5% of their already tiny numbers.

The film's last act presents Bitaté taking up Ari's patrol leadership, teaching drone and film technology to tribe members in order to document settler intrusion and monitor territory boundaries. The tribe implements a de facto police apparatus, arresting individual settlers and destroying their out-buildings and implements. Bandeira continues her steadfast advocacy and organizing despite being deeply shaken by Ari's murder. The tribe's position is presented as resolute but extremely precarious at the film's end, with a concluding crawl noting that the Amazon clearance, the invasion of indigenous land and the appropriation of resources continues to accelerate under the Bolsonaro administration.

== Release and reception ==
The film had its world premiere at the 2022 Sundance Film Festival on January 22, 2022. Shortly after, National Geographic Documentary Films acquired distribution rights to the film. It was released in the United States on August 19, 2022. The Territory received positive reviews from film critics. On Rotten Tomatoes, it has a 97% approval rating based on 63 reviews, with an average rating of 8/10. The website's critics consensus reads: "Visually striking, formally refreshing, and ultimately enraging, The Territory is a powerful advocacy documentary with the heart of a thriller." On Metacritic, the film holds a score of 83 out of 100 based on 17 critics, indicating "universal acclaim".

Critics acknowledge that The Territory is an advocacy film rather than a strictly disinterested documentary. The New York Times notes in its review that Indigenous people and settlers "are given near-equal amounts of screen time" but that "Pritz does not draw a false equivalency between the two; in fact, the longer time is spent with the farmers, the more alarming their gap of understanding toward the Uru Eu Wau Wau becomes." The sense of intimacy created by immediate, personal portraits of conflicting perspectives is praised across reviews, heightened by striking visuals and sound design. The LA Times calls the film a "a gripping portrait of an endangered community." A more critical review at RogerEbert.com acknowledges the cinematography but suggests that the hero-villain narrative risks simplicity and becomes monotous.

=== Accolades ===
Award	Date of ceremony	Category	Recipient(s)	Result	Ref.
Cinema Eye Honors	January 12, 2023	Outstanding Non-Fiction Feature	Alex Pritz, Darren Aronofsky, Gabriel Uchida, Sigrid Dyekjær, Lizzie Gillett, and Will N. Miller	Nominated	
Cinema Eye Honors	January 12, 2023	Outstanding Production	Alex Pritz, Darren Aronofsky, Gabriel Uchida, Sigrid Dyekjær, Lizzie Gillett, and Will N. Miller	Nominated	
Cinema Eye Honors	January 12, 2023	Outstanding Cinematography	Alex Pritz and Tangãi Uru-eu-wau-wau	Nominated	
Cinema Eye Honors	January 12, 2023	Outstanding Original Score	Katya Mihailova	Nominated	
Cinema Eye Honors	January 12, 2023	Outstanding Sound Design	Rune Klausen and Peter Albrechtsen	Nominated	
Cinema Eye Honors	January 12, 2023	Outstanding Debut	Alex Pritz	Won	
Cinema Eye Honors	January 12, 2023	Audience Choice Prize	The Territory	Nominated	
Cinema Eye Honors	January 12, 2023	The Unforgettables	Bitaté Uru-eu-wau-wau and Neidinha Bandeira	Won	
Copenhagen International Documentary Film Festival	March 23 – April 3, 2022	F:act Award – Special Mention	The Territory	Won	
Critics' Choice Documentary Awards	November 13, 2022	Best First Documentary Feature	Alex Pritz	Nominated	
Critics' Choice Documentary Awards	November 13, 2022	Best Science/Nature Documentary	The Territory	Nominated	
Critics' Choice Documentary Awards	November 13, 2022	Best Cinematography	Alex Pritz and Tangãi Uru-eu-wau-wau	Nominated	
Dublin Film Critics Circle Awards	December 15, 2022	Best Documentary	The Territory	9th place	
Golden Reel Awards	February 26, 2023	Outstanding Achievement in Sound Editing – Feature Documentary	Rune Klausen, Peter Albrechtsen, Mikkel Nielsen, Tim Nielsen, Sebastian Vaskio, Guilherme Tortolo Magrin, Pietu Korhonen, and Heikki Kossi	Nominated	
Golden Trailer Awards	June 29, 2023	Best Documentary TV Spot (for a Feature Film)	The Territory (ZEALOT)	Nominated	
Golden Trailer Awards	June 29, 2023	Best Original Score TV Spot (for a Feature Film)	The Territory (ZEALOT)	Nominated	
Gotham Awards	November 28, 2022	Best Documentary	The Territory	Nominated	
International Wildlife Film Festival	April 23–30, 2022	Best of Festival Award	The Territory	Won	
International Wildlife Film Festival	April 23–30, 2022	Best Sustainable Planet Category	The Territory	Won	
Mountainfilm	May 30, 2022	Moving Mountains Award	The Territory	Won	
Peabody Awards	June 11, 2023	Documentary	The Territory	Won	
Primetime Emmy Awards	January 7–8, 2024	Exceptional Merit In Documentary Filmmaking	Alex Pritz, Darren Aronofsky, Sigrid Dyekjær, Will N. Miller, Gabriel Uchida, Lizzie Gillett, and Txai Suruí	Won	
Primetime Emmy Awards	January 7–8, 2024	Outstanding Directing For A Documentary/Nonfiction Program	Alex Pritz	Nominated	
Primetime Emmy Awards	January 7–8, 2024	Outstanding Cinematography For A Nonfiction Program	Alex Pritz and Tangãi Uru-eu-wau-wa	Nominated	
Producers Guild of America Awards	February 25, 2023	Outstanding Producer of Documentary Theatrical Motion Pictures	Sigrid Dyekjaer, Will Miller, Lizzie Gillett, Darren Aronofsky, Gabriel Uchida, and Alex Pritz	Nominated	
Provincetown International Film Festival	June 15–19, 2022	John Schlesinger Documentary Award	Alex Pritz	Won	
Satellite Awards	March 3, 2023	Best Motion Picture – Documentary	The Territory	Nominated	
Seattle International Film Festival	April 24, 2022	Golden Space Needle Award – Best Documentary	The Territory	Won	
Sheffield DocFest	June 23–28, 2022	Tim Hetherington Award – Special Mention	The Territory	Won	
Sundance Film Festival	January 20–30, 2022	World Cinema Documentary – Audience Award	The Territory	Won	
Sundance Film Festival	January 20–30, 2022	World Cinema Documentary – Special Jury Award for Documentary Craft	The Territory	Won	
Zurich Film Festival	October 1, 2022	Science Film Award	The Territory	Won	
