= Paiter =

Indigenous people of Brazil

Total population
- 1,172 (2010)

Regions with significant populations
- Brazil (Mato Grosso and Rondônia)

Languages
- Suruí-Paíter

Related ethnic groups
- Cinta Larga and Gavião do Jiparaná

The Paiter, also known as Suruí, Suruí do Jiparaná, and Suruí de Rondônia, are an Indigenous people of Brazil, who live in ten villages near the Mato Grosso–Rondônia border. They are farmers, who cultivate coffee.

== Language ==
The Paiter speak the Suruí-Paíter language, which belongs to the Tupi-Guarani language family. Portions of the Bible were translated into Suruí-Paíter in 1991.

== Origins ==
A 2015 genetic study reached a surprising conclusion about the origins of the Surui people. Unlike other Native American peoples, the Surui, Karitiana, and Xavante have an ancestry partially related to Indigenous populations of the Andaman Islands, New Guinea, and Australia. Scientists speculate that the relationship derives from an earlier people, called "Population Y", in East Asia from whence both groups diverged 15,000 to 30,000 years ago, the future Australasians migrating south and the remote ancestors of the Surui northward, finding their way to the New World and to the interior Amazon Basin.

== History ==
The first prolonged contact with the modern world came in 1969. The tribe was decimated by disease; nearly 90 percent died within a few years. In the 1970s, FUNAI provided some supplies to the Paiter for a few years before stopping abruptly. Before contact, the Surui people lived by foraging, fishing, and hunting. After contact, FUNAI encouraged them to exploit their natural resources, leading to wood extraction and mining activities which caused deterioration of the traditional culture and social issues (introduction of drugs and alcoohol in the community). Exploitation activities also disrupted traditional relation to the territory with the introduction of notions of private ownership instead of communal area. In the 1980s, the Paiter requested public assistance to improve their precarious living counditions, in vain. Young members of the community were then encouraged to "study in the city", the young leaders contributed to the generation of new ideas. In 1988, the Paiter formed a territorial association called Metairelá which applied for funding, including Paiter Suruí Carbon Credit REDD+ Project.

In 2009, the Surui have launched a forest carbon project as part of their 50-year tribal management plan. Conceived in 2007, the project hoped to reforest and avoid degradation with Surui lands. A 2010 legal opinion by Baker & McKenzie determined that the Surui own the carbon rights to the territory, setting a precedent for future Indigenous-led carbon projects in Brazil.

Significant progress was next made in 2013. The project has now gained verification through the Verified Carbon Standard (VCS) and Climate, Community and Biodiversity (CCB) Alliance as a REDD+ project. In September 2013, the Surui Forest Carbon Project transacted its first sale of 120,000 tons of carbon offsets to Brazilian cosmetics firm Natura Cosméticos. The project is designed to sequester at least five million tons of carbon dioxide over 30 years while protecting critical rainforest habitat. Profits from the sale of credits will be used as part of the 50-year tribal management plan.

The plan was to replace extractive activities (e.g. illegal deforestation) by sustainable entrepreneurship projects. However, the administrative requirements needed to access the Surui Forest Carbon Project funds discouraged community members, many projects remained unachieved and the community failed to stay within the maximum deforestation rate of the REDD+, leading to the interruption of the Surui Forest Carbon Project in 2017.

== Use of digital technologies ==
In 2009, the Surui, under the leadership of Almir Narayamoga Suruí, have made headlines as one of the first Indigenous people of South America to use high-tech tools (in particular Google Earth) to police their territory. In cooperation with Google Earth Outreach, they can request more detailed satellite photos when they spot suspicious areas. If loggers or miners are detected, they refer the case to the authorities who have them removed. Satellite pictures show that this is highly effective as the Suruí territory is the only intact remaining piece of rainforest in the area.

== See also ==
- Indigenous peoples in Brazil
- List of Indigenous peoples in Brazil
