= All the Beauty and the Bloodshed (soundtrack) =

All the Beauty and the Bloodshed (Music from the Motion Picture)

Film score by Soundwalk Collective
- Released: April 21, 2023
- Genre: Film score
- Length: 33:00
- Label: Analogue Foundation
- Producers: Stephan Crasneanscki; Simone Merli; Dawn Sutter Madell

Soundwalk Collective chronology
Lovotic (2022)	All the Beauty and the Bloodshed (2023)

All the Beauty and the Bloodshed (Music from the Motion Picture) is the soundtrack to the 2022 documentary film All the Beauty and the Bloodshed about photographer, artist, and activist Nan Goldin. The album features the original score from the film composed by Stephan Crasneanscki and Simone Merli through their experimental art collective group Soundwalk Collective. The group co-produced it with Dawn Sutter Madell who composed additional music for the film although her contributions were not included in the album. The score also contained dialogues and excerpts from Goldin.

The album was not released alongside the film's premiere in November 2022, and instead it was released through the Analogue Foundation label on April 21, 2023, through digital, CD and vinyl formats. The album was preceded by the lead single "Schimmer Sanft den Klang des Tages" which was released on the album's announcement on March 17, 2023.

== Development ==
Crasneanscki and Merli involved in the project, after their meeting Nan Goldin at the Venice Biennale festival, and their significant work for her photographic installations and slideshows. During their discussions with Laura Poitras, Merli and Crasneanscki recorded several themes for the film, after they took a quite improvisational turn. With the help of their colleague Dhanesh Jayaselan, they invited several string players and operatic singers in studio and played their recordings into the headphones while conducting and while gradually removing the layers of the initial music, they found the final piece to be "quite special and intimate".

Crasneanscki freely associated with the work of German poet Friedrich Hölderlin, where in his final poems (being written fragmented as Hölderlin suffered from mental illness) he renders nature in fragility and ephemerality and themes emerge in Poitras' portrayal of Goldin inspired the composition. During the first sessions, they invited Mulay Winter and Youka Snell to record Hölderlin's words and repeat it as mantras to find the structure and harmony which was essentially dictated by the syllables and phonetics of the words they chose and by layering and echoing various styles from sacred music to modern minimalism, the lyrics almost served as a possessed language that formed cyclic patterns overlapping multiple times and expand in intensity to produce "a sort of trance, oscillating between grace and madness". They embarked on the process to include only pieces with vocal instrumentation to illustrate Goldin's and her sister's story, but also the opioid crisis which is really a story of pain, and needed a level of sensitivity being expressed through the organic and intimate texture of the voice.

== Track listing ==
No.	Title	Length
1.	"Half of Life"	7:23
2.	"Schimmer Sanft den Klang des Tages"	3:17
3.	"The Land and the Sea"	2:22
4.	"Sisters I" (feat. Nan Goldin)	2:30
5.	"Des Geistes Werden"	3:36
6.	"Before the Light"	2:11
7.	"Witnesses"	3:24
8.	"Zeitgeist"	2:33
9.	"To Zimmer"	2:11
10.	"Sisters II" (feat. Nan Goldin)	3:33
Total length:		33:00

== Reception ==
Sheri Linden of The Hollywood Reporter discussed that Soundwalk Collective's score provides "shivers and shimmers". Reviewing for Eye for Film, Andrew Robertson praised the integration of the sonic landscapes and the collaborative compositions provide some emotion to the proceedings".

== Accolades ==
Award	Date of ceremony	Category	Recipient(s)	Result	Ref.
Cinema Eye Honors	January 12, 2023	Outstanding Original Score	Soundwalk Collective	Nominated	

== Personnel ==
Credits adapted from liner notes:

- Music production: Stephan Crasneanscki, Simone Merli
- Strings: Anthea Caddy, Davis West, Lucas Sanchez, Marie Langlamet, Wolf Hassinger, Youka Snell
- Featured vocalists: Fanny Mulay Winter, Holan Gultom, Sidney Kwadjo Frenz, Youka Snell
- Conductor and string arrangements: Zacharias Falkenberg
- Orchestra arrangements: Johannes Malfatti
- Additional arrangements: Aurelien Rivière
- Recorded at: Analogue Foundation Berlin
- Mixing: Russell Elevado
- Mastering: Tim Reese
