= Nuisance Bear =

Nuisance Bear may refer to:

- Nuisance Bear (2021 film), a short documentary film
- Nuisance Bear (2026 film), a feature-length expansion of the 2021 film
