= 16th Cinema Eye Honors =

- Date: January 12, 2023
- Location: Museum of the Moving Image, Astoria, New York
- Most wins: Fire of Love (4)
- Most nominations: Film: Fire of Love and The Territory (7); TV: Four Hours at the Capitol (3)
- Website: cinemaeyehonors.com

The 16th Cinema Eye Honors recognized outstanding artistry and craft in nonfiction filmmaking of 2022 and took place at the Museum of the Moving Image in Astoria, New York on January 12, 2023.

The broadcast category nominees as well as the recipient of the Legacy Award, given to the 1995 film Crumb, were announced on October 20, 2022. The Unforgettables and the Audience Choice Prize longlist were presented on October 25, 2022, while the nominations for the feature film categories were announced on November 10, 2022.

National Geographic films Fire of Love and The Territory led the nominations with seven each, becoming the films with the most nominations in a year in the history of the awards. In the broadcast nominations, the HBO film Four Hours at the Capitol led with three.

All That Breathes received the Outstanding Non-Fiction Feature while Fire of Love received the most awards with four wins, including three competitive awards plus The Unforgettables Award.

== Winners and nominees ==
The winners are listed first and in bold.

=== Feature film ===
| Outstanding Non-Fiction Feature | Outstanding Direction |
|---|---|
| **All That Breathes – Directed and Produced by Shaunak Sen; Produced by Aman Mann and Teddy Leifer**; All the Beauty and the Bloodshed – Directed and Produced by Laura Poitras; Produced by Howard Gertler, John Lyons, Nan Goldin and Yoni Golijov; Fire of Love – Directed and Produced by Sara Dosa; Produced by Shane Boris and Ina Fichman; Navalny – Directed by Daniel Roher; Produced by Odessa Rae, Diane Becker, Melanie Miller and Shane Boris; A Night of Knowing Nothing – Directed by Payal Kapadia; Produced by Thomas Hakim, Julien Graff and Ranabir Das; The Territory – Directed and Produced by Alex Pritz; Produced by Darren Aronofsky, Gabriel Uchida, Sigrid Dyekjær, Lizzie Gillett and Will N. Miller | **All the Beauty and the Bloodshed – Laura Poitras**; All That Breathes – Shaunak Sen; Beba – Rebeca Huntt; Descendant – Margaret Brown; Fire of Love – Sara Dosa; A Night of Knowing Nothing – Payal Kapadia |
| Outstanding Editing | Outstanding Production |
| **Fire of Love – Erin Casper and Jocelyne Chaput**; All the Beauty and the Bloodshed – Amy Foote, Joe Bini and Brian A. Kates; Moonage Daydream – Brett Morgen; Riotsville, USA – Nels Bangerter; Three Minutes: A Lengthening – Katharina Wartena | **Navalny – Odessa Rae, Diane Becker, Melanie Miller and Shane Boris**; All That Breathes – Aman Mann, Shaunak Sen and Teddy Leifer; A House Made of Splinters – Monica Hellström; In Her Hands – Juan Camilo Cruz and Jonathan Schaerf; The Territory – Alex Pritz, Darren Aronofsky, Gabriel Uchida, Sigrid Dyekjær, Lizzie Gillett and Will N. Miller |
| Outstanding Cinematography | Outstanding Original Score |
| **All That Breathes – Ben Bernhard**; Cow – Magda Kowalczyk; A House Made of Splinters – Simon Lereng Wilmont; A Night of Knowing Nothing – Ranabir Das; The Territory – Alex Pritz and Tangãi Uru-eu-wau-wau; Users – Bennett Cerf | **Fire of Love – Nicolas Godin**; All the Beauty and the Bloodshed – Soundwalk Collective; Descendant – Ray Angry, Rhiannon Giddens and Dirk Powell; Nothing Compares – Linda Buckley and Irene Buckley; The Territory – Katya Mihailova; Users – Dave Cerf |
| Outstanding Sound Design | Outstanding Visual Design |
| **Moonage Daydream – Samir Foco, John Warhurst and Nina Hartstone**; All That Breathes – Niladri Shekhar Roy and Susmit "Bob" Nath; Fire of Love – Patrice LeBlanc and Gavin Fernandes; I Didn't See You There – Tom Paul and Andrés E. Marthe González; The Territory – Rune Klausen and Peter Albrechtsen | **Moonage Daydream – Stefan Nadelman**; **Fire of Love – Lucy Munger, Kara Blake and Rui Ting Ji**; Dear Mr. Brody – Gary Walker, John Mark Lapham and Sam Klatt; Louis Armstrong's Black & Blues – Hectah Arias; My Old School – Rory Lowe and Scott Morriss |
| Outstanding Debut | Outstanding Non-Fiction Short |
| **The Territory – Directed by Alex Pritz**; Bad Axe – Directed by David Siev; Beba – Directed by Rebeca Huntt; I Didn't See You There – Directed by Reid Davenport; A Night of Knowing Nothing – Directed by Payal Kapadia; Nothing Compares – Directed by Kathryn Ferguson | **Nuisance Bear – Directed by Jack Weisman and Gabriela Osio Vanden**; In Flow of Words – Directed by Eliane Esther Bots; Last Days of August – Directed by Rodrigo Ojeda-Beck and Robert Machoian; Long Line of Ladies – Directed by Rayka Zehtabchi and Shaandiin Tome; The Martha Mitchell Effect – Directed by Anne Alvergue and Debra McClutchy; Shut Up and Paint – Directed by Alex Mallis and Titus Kaphar |
| Spotlight Award | Heterodox Award |
| **Master of Light – Directed by Rosa Ruth Boesten**; After Sherman – Directed by Jon-Sesrie Goff; Brotherhood – Directed by Francesco Montagner; Hidden Letters – Directed by Violet Du Feng and Zhao Qing; Into the Ice – Directed by Lars Henrik Ostenfeld | **Aftersun – Directed by Charlotte Wells**; Dry Ground Burning – Directed by Joana Pimenta and Adirley Queirós; Dos Estaciones – Directed by Juan Pablo González; Marcel the Shell with Shoes On – Directed by Dean Fleischer-Camp; The Rehearsal (Season 1) – Directed by Nathan Fielder |
| Audience Choice Prize | The Unforgettables |
| **Navalny – Directed by Daniel Roher**; All That Breathes – Directed by Shaunak Sen; The Balcony Movie – Directed by Paweł Łoziński; Fire of Love – Directed by Sara Dosa; Last Flight Home – Directed by Ondi Timoner; Mija – Directed by Isabel Castro; My Old School – Directed by Jono McLeod; Nothing Compares – Directed by Kathryn Ferguson; "Sr." – Directed by Chris Smith; The Territory – Directed by Alex Pritz | **All That Breathes – Mohammad Saud and Nadeem Shehzad**; **All the Beauty and the Bloodshed – Nan Goldin**; **Bad Axe – Chun Siev**; **Beba – Rebeca Huntt**; **Fire of Love – Katia and Maurice Krafft**; **Gabby Giffords Won't Back Down – Gabby Giffords**; **I Didn't See You There – Reid Davenport**; **In Her Hands – Zarifa Ghafari**; **Last Flight Home – Eli Timoner**; **Mija – Doris Muñoz**; **My Old School – Brandon Lee**; **Navalny – Alexei Navalny**; **Nothing Compares – Sinéad O'Connor**; **"Sr." – Robert Downey Sr.**; **The Territory – Bitaté Uru-eu-wau-wau and Neidinha Bandeira** |

=== Broadcast ===
| Outstanding Broadcast Film | Outstanding Nonfiction Series |
|---|---|
| **Chernobyl: The Lost Tapes – Directed by James Jones (HBO Documentary Films/HBO Max)**; Downfall: The Case Against Boeing – Directed by Rory Kennedy (Netflix); Four Hours at the Capitol – Directed by Jamie Roberts (HBO Documentary Films/HBO Max); George Carlin's American Dream – Directed by Judd Apatow and Michael Bonfiglio (HBO Documentary Films/HBO Max); Playing With Sharks – Directed by Sally Aitken (Disney+) | **Black and Missing – Directed by Geeta Gandbhir and Samantha Knowles (HBO Documentary Films/HBO Max)**; The Beatles: Get Back – Directed by Peter Jackson (Disney+); Keep Sweet: Pray and Obey – Directed by Rachel Dretzin (Netflix); LuLaRich – Directed by Julia Willoughby Nason and Jenner Furst (Amazon Studios); Mind Over Murder – Directed by Nanfu Wang (HBO Documentary Films/HBO Max); We Need to Talk About Cosby – Directed by W. Kamau Bell (Showtime) |
| Outstanding Anthology Series | Shorts List (Cinema Eye's Annual List of the Year's Top Short Documentaries) |
| **How To with John Wilson – Nathan Fielder, Michael Koman, Clark Reinking and John Wilson, Executive Producers (HBO)**; Origins of Hip Hop – Peter Bittenbender, Mark Grande, Slane Hatch; Supervising Producers: Amira Lewally and Phoenix Skye Maulella, Executive Producers (A&E); Prehistoric Planet – Jon Favreau and Mike Gunton, Executive Producers; Tim Walker, Series Producer (Apple TV+); Stanley Tucci: Searching for Italy – Tom Barry, Adam Hawkins, Eve Kay and Stanley Tucci, Executive Producers; Robin O'Sullivan, Series Producer (CNN); Women Who Rock – Jessica Hopper, Rachel Brill, John Varvatos, Derik Murray and Jesse James Miller, Executive Producers (EPIX); The World According to Jeff Goldblum – Jeff Goldblum, Jane Root, Sara Brailsford, Keith Addis and Arif Nurmohamed, Executive Producers, Ben Jessop, Series Producer (Disney+) | Anastasia – Directed by Sarah McCarthy; The Dreamlife of Georgie Stone – Directed by Maya Newell; The Joys and Sorrows of Young Yuguo – Directed by Ilinca Călugăreanu; Keys to the City – Directed by Ian Moubayed; In Flow of Words – Directed by Eliane Esther Bots; Last Days of August – Directed by Robert Machoian and Rodrigo Ojeda-Beck; Long Line of Ladies – Directed by Rayka Zehtabchi and Shaandiin Tome; The Martha Mitchell Effect – Directed by Anne Alvergue and Debra McClutchy; Nuisance Bear – Directed by Jack Weisman and Gabriela Osio Vanden; Shut Up and Paint – Directed by Alex Mallis and Titus Kaphar |
| Outstanding Broadcast Editing | Outstanding Broadcast Cinematography |
| **We Need to Talk About Cosby – Meg Ramsay (Showtime)**; 37 Words – Jessica Congdon and Dave Marcus (ESPN); The Beatles: Get Back – Jabeez Olssen (Disney+); Four Hours at the Capitol – Will Grayburn (HBO Documentary Films/HBO Max); How to Survive a Pandemic – Adam Evans and Tyler H. Walk (HBO Documentary Films/HBO Max); How To with John Wilson – Adam Locke-Norton (HBO) | **Playing With Sharks – Michael Taylor, Judd Overton, Nathan Barlow and Toby Ralph (Disney+)**; Four Hours at the Capitol – Jamie Roberts (HBO Documentary Films/HBO Max); jeen-yuhs: A Kanye Trilogy – Coodie Simmons and Danny "DNA" Sorge (Netflix); Stanley Tucci: Searching for Italy – Andrew Muggleton (CNN); Tony Hawk: Until the Wheels Come Off – Sam Jones and Jesse Green (HBO Documentary Films/HBO Max) |

=== Legacy Awards ===
- **Crumb – Directed by Terry Zwigoff; Produced by Lynn O'Donnell and Terry Zwigoff; Edited by Victor Livingston; Cinematography by Maryse Alberti; Music by David Beddinghaus; Sound by Scott Breindell**
