= 7th Critics' Choice Documentary Awards =

- Date: November 13, 2022
- Site: Edison Ballroom, New York City, United States
- Hosted by: Wyatt Cenac
- Most wins: Good Night Oppy (5)
- Most nominations: Fire of Love (7)

Television/radio coverage
- Network: Facebook Live; Instagram Live

7th Critics' Choice Documentary Awards, presented by the Critics Choice Association, was held on November 13, 2022, at the Edison Ballroom in New York City, to honor finest achievements in documentary filmmaking and non-fiction television. The ceremony was hosted by Wyatt Cenac and was broadcast on Facebook Live and Instagram Live.

The nominees were announced on October 17, 2022, with Fire of Love leading the nominations with seven, followed by Good Night Oppy with six. American documentary film director Barbara Kopple received the Pennebaker Award.

== Notes ==
The categories for Best Ongoing Documentary Series and Best Limited Documentary Series were moved from the Critics' Choice Real TV Awards back to the Critics' Choice Documentary Awards, both categories used to be awarded in the latter until 2018.

== Winners and nominees ==
The nominations were announced on October 17, 2022. Winners are listed first and in bold.

**Best Documentary Feature**: **Good Night Oppy** **(Amazon Studios) (winner)**; Aftershock (Hulu); The Automat (A Slice of Pie Productions); Descendant (Netflix); Fire of Love (National Geographic Documentary Films/Neon); Gabby Giffords Won't Back Down (Briarcliff Entertainment); The Janes (HBO); Moonage Daydream (HBO/Neon); Navalny (HBO/CNN/Warner Bros. Pictures); Sidney (Apple TV+)
**Best Director**: **Good Night Oppy** – **Ryan White (Amazon Studios)**; George Carlin's American Dream – Judd Apatow and Michael Bonfiglio (HBO); Descendant – Margaret Brown (Netflix); Fire of Love – Sara Dosa (National Geographic Documentary Films/Neon); Sidney – Reginald Hudlin (Apple TV+); Moonage Daydream – Brett Morgen (HBO/Neon); All the Beauty and the Bloodshed – Laura Poitras (HBO/Neon); Navalny – Daniel Roher (HBO/CNN/Warner Bros. Pictures)	**Best First Documentary Feature**: **Bad Axe** – **David Siev (IFC Films)**; Cow – Andrea Arnold (IFC Films); The Automat – Lisa Hurwitz (A Slice of Pie Productions); My Old School – Jono McLeod (Magnolia Pictures); Lucy and Desi – Amy Poehler (Amazon Studios); The Territory – Alex Pritz (National Geographic Documentary Films); Three Minutes: A Lengthening – Bianca Stigter (Neon)
**Best Archival Documentary**: **Fire of Love** **(National Geographic Documentary Films/Neon)**; The Beatles: Get Back (Disney+); Moonage Daydream (HBO/Neon); Nothing Compares (Showtime); Riotsville, U.S.A. (Magnolia Pictures); Three Minutes: A Lengthening (Neon)	**Best Biographical Documentary**: **Sidney** – **(Apple TV+)**; George Carlin's American Dream (HBO); The Last Movie Stars (HBO Max); Lucy and Desi (Amazon Studios); The Rebellious Life of Mrs. Rosa Parks (Peacock); Salvatore: Shoemaker of Dreams (Sony Pictures Classics); "Sr." (Netflix)
**Best Political Documentary**: **Navalny** – **(HBO/CNN/Warner Bros. Pictures)**; Aftershock (Hulu); All the Beauty and the Bloodshed (HBO/Neon); Gabby Giffords Won't Back Down (Briarcliff Entertainment); The Janes (HBO); Retrograde (National Geographic Documentary Films); Freedom on Fire: Ukraine's Fight for Freedom (Netflix)	**Best Sports Documentary**: **Citizen Ashe** **(Magnolia/HBO) (tied)**; **Welcome to Wrexham** **(FX/Hulu) (tied)**; Hockeyland (Greenwich Entertainment); Kaepernick & America (Dark Star Pictures); McEnroe (Showtime); The Redeem Team (Netflix)
**Best Historical Documentary**: **Descendant** **(Netflix)**; The Automat (A Slice of Pie Productions); The Janes (HBO); Lowndes County and the Road to Black Power (Peacock); Still Working 9 to 5 (Mighty Fine Entertainment); Three Minutes: A Lengthening (Neon); The U.S. and the Holocaust (PBS)	**Best Science/Nature Documentary**: **Good Night Oppy** **(Amazon Studios)**; All That Breathes (HBO); Cow (IFC Films); Fire of Love (National Geographic Documentary Films/Neon); Nuisance Bear (The New Yorker); Return to Space (Netflix); The Territory (National Geographic Documentary Films)
**Best Music Documentary**: **The Beatles: Get Back** **(Disney+)**; Hallelujah: Leonard Cohen, A Journey, A Song (Sony Pictures Classics); If These Walls Could Sing (Disney Original Documentary); Louis Armstrong's Black & Blues (Apple TV+); Moonage Daydream (HBO/Neon); Nothing Compares (Showtime); The Return of Tanya Tucker: Featuring Brandi Carlile (Sony Pictures Classics)	**Best Short Documentary**: **Nuisance Bear** **(The New Yorker)**; 38 at the Garden (HBO); Angola Do You Hear Us? Voices From a Plantation Prison (MTV Documentary Films); The Flagmakers (National Geographic Documentary Films); Four Seasons Total Documentary (MSNBC); My Disability Roadmap (The New York Times Op Docs); Stranger at the Gate (The New Yorker)
**Best Ongoing Documentary Series**: **30 for 30** **(ESPN)**; American Masters (PBS); Cheer (Netflix); The Circus: Inside the Greatest Political Show on Earth (Showtime); Unsolved Mysteries (Netflix); Welcome to Wrexham (FX/Hulu)	**Best Limited Documentary Series**: **The Beatles: Get Back** **(Disney+)**; Hostages (HBO); The Last Movie Stars (HBO Max); The Lincoln Project (Showtime); Our Great National Parks (Netflix); The U.S. and the Holocaust (PBS); We Need to Talk About Cosby (Showtime)
**Best Narration**: **Good Night Oppy** – **Written by Helen Kearns and Ryan White; Performed by Angela Bassett (Amazon Studios)**; Deep in the Heart: A Texas Wildlife Story – Written by Ben Masters; Performed by Matthew McConaughey (Fin and Fur Films); Fire of Love – Written by Shane Boris, Erin Casper, Jocelyne Chaput, Sara Dosa; Performed by Miranda July (National Geographic Documentary Films/Neon); Our Great National Parks – Performed by Barack Obama (Netflix); Riotsville, U.S.A. – Written by Tobi Haslett; Performed by Charlene Modeste (Magnolia Pictures); Three Minutes: A Lengthening – Written by Bianca Stigter; Performed by Helena Bonham Carter (Neon)	**Best Score**: **Good Night Oppy** – **Blake Neely (Amazon Studios)**; The Automat – Hummie Mann (A Slice of Pie Productions); Fire of Love – Nicolas Godin (National Geographic Documentary Films/Neon); The Janes – Max Avery Lichtenstein (HBO); Lucy and Desi – David Schwartz (Amazon Studios); Navalny – Marius de Vries and Matt Robertson (HBO/CNN/Warner Bros. Pictures)
**Best Cinematography**: **Our Great National Parks** – **Cinematography Team (Netflix)**; All That Breathes – Benjamin Bernhard and Riju Das (HBO); Cow – Magda Kowalczyk (IFC Films); McEnroe – Lucas Tucknott (Showtime); Nuisance Bear – Gabriela Osio Vanden, Jack Weisman, Sam Holling (The New Yorker); The Territory – Alex Pritz and Tangãi Uru-eu-wau-wau (National Geographic Documentary Films)	**Best Editing**: **Moonage Daydream** – **Brett Morgen (HBO/Neon)**; The Beatles: Get Back – Jabez Olssen (Disney+); Fire of Love – Erin Casper and Jocelyne Chaput (National Geographic Documentary Films/Neon); George Carlin's American Dream – Joe Beshenkovsky (HBO); Good Night Oppy – Helen Kearns and Rejh Cabrera (Amazon Studios); Navalny – Langdon Page and Maya Daisy Hawke (HBO/CNN/Warner Bros. Pictures); Three Minutes: A Lengthening – Katharina Wartena (Neon)

=== Pennebaker Award ===
- **Barbara Kopple**

== Films with multiple wins and nominations ==
Films with multiple nominations
Nominations	Film
7	Fire of Love
6	Good Night Oppy
5	Moonage Daydream
5	Navalny
5	Three Minutes: A Lengthening
4	The Automat
4	The Janes
4	The Beatles: Get Back
3	Descendant
3	Sidney
3	George Carlin's American Dream
3	Cow
3	Lucy and Desi
3	The Territory
3	Nuisance Bear
3	Our Great National Parks
2	Aftershock
2	Gabby Giffords Won't Back Down
2	Nothing Compares
2	Riotsville, U.S.A.
2	The Last Movie Stars
2	McEnroe
2	Welcome to Wrexham
2	The U.S. and the Holocaust
2	All That Breathes
2	All the Beauty and the Bloodshed

Films with multiple wins
Wins	Film
5	Good Night Oppy
2	The Beatles: Get Back
