= Riotsville, U.S.A. =

2022 American documentary film

- Theatrical release poster
- Directed by: Sierra Pettengill
- Written by: Tobi Haslett
- Produced by: Sara Archambault; Jamila Wignot
- Edited by: Nels Bangerter
- Music by: Jace Clayton
- Production companies: Arch + Bow Films; Canal & the Gallery; Field of Vision; LinLay Production; Trailer 9 XRM Media
- Distributed by: Magnolia Pictures
- Release date: 21 January 2022 (Sundance Film Festival)
- Running time: 91 minutes
- Country: United States
- Language: English

Riotsville, U.S.A. is a 2022 American documentary film by Sierra Pettengill and narrated by Charlene Modeste.

== Summary ==
Using mainly archival footage shot by the media and U.S. government, the film examines fictional towns that were created by military officials to train police and soldiers during the civil unrest of 1960s America. The filmmakers learned about these fictional towns after reading author Rick Perlstein's 2008 book Nixonland.

== Reception ==
The film received 90% on Rotten Tomatoes from critics.

=== Awards ===
- 7th Critics' Choice Documentary Awards:
  - Best Archival Documentary (nomination)
  - Best Narration (nomination)
- IDA Documentary Awards:
  - ABC News VideoSource Award (won)

== See also ==
- Counterculture of the 1960s
- Police brutality in the United States
- Copaganda
- Kerner Commission
- Institutional racism
- Militarization of police
