= The Case Against 8 =

- Directed by: Ben Cotner; Ryan White
- Produced by: Ben Cotner; Ryan White
- Music by: Blake Neely (themes)
- Release date: January 18, 2014 (Sundance)
- Running time: 112 minutes
- Country: United States
- Language: English

The Case Against 8 is an American documentary film, which premiered at the 2014 Sundance Film Festival on January 18, 2014. Directed and produced by Ben Cotner and Ryan White, the film documents the legal battle to overturn California's Proposition 8, focusing in particular on behind-the-scenes footage of David Boies and Theodore Olson during the Perry v. Schwarzenegger case.

== Cast ==
- Theodore Olson - Himself (billed as Ted Olson)
- Christopher D. Dusseault - Himself (billed as Chris Dusseault)
- Jeffrey J. Zarrillo - Himself (billed as Jeff Zarrillo)
- Paul T. Katami - Himself (billed as Paul Katami)
- Kristin M. Perry - Herself (billed as Kris Perry)
- Sandra B. Stier - Herself (billed as Sandy Stier)
- David Boies - Himself
- Ted Uno - Himself
- Chad Griffin - Himself, American Foundation for Equal Rights
- Kristina Schake - Herself, American Foundation for Equal Rights co-founder
- Adam Umhoefer - Himself - Executive director, American Foundation for Equal Rights
- Elliott Perry - Himself (billed as Elliot Perry)
- Frank Stier - Himself
- Tom Stier - Himself
- Spencer Perry - Himself

== Release ==
Cotner and White won the Directing Award: U.S. Documentary at the Sundance Film Festival. The film was also subsequently screened at the 2014 SXSW festival, where it won an Audience Award.

The film screened at the 2014 Hot Docs Canadian International Documentary Festival in Toronto, Ontario and went on to screen within such festivals as SXSW and Maryland Film Festival. The film also received a limited theatrical release in June 2014, screening in New York City, Los Angeles and other major US cities before airing on HBO on June 23.

In Australia, it screened in conjunction with Queer Screen and Australian Marriage Equality on the 20th of August. Independent MP and Chair of AME Alex Greenwich introduced the film to the audience where he mentioned Australia's conservative government pollster Crosby Textor Group and the research that has polled the biggest support for same-sex marriage in Australia where 72% of Australians support legalising same-sex marriage.

== Proposed film adaptation ==
On April 21, 2016, Marielle Heller was set to direct the feature film adaptation for Peter Chernin's Chernin Entertainment and 20th Century Fox. However, its fate is unknown after Disney's acquisition of 21st Century Fox was completed.
