= Mirage Film Festival =

Film festival in Oslo, Norway

- Most recent: 2024
- Website: https://www.mirage.no/

The Mirage Film Festival is an annual documentary film festival in Norway.

Set in Oslo, the festival annually presents a curated selection of creative documentary films awarded in the major events in the fields; including, Cannes, Berlinale, Venice, Rotterdam, Visions du Réel, and CPH:DOX.

The festival also presents artistic and experimental films, hybrid works, and retrospectives of classics within the documentary genre.

Filmmakers who have participated to the event include Pierre-Yves Vandeweerd, Payal Kapadia, Tsai Ming-liang, Emilija Škarnulytė, Verena Paravel, Lucien Castaing-Taylor.

== Awards ==
=== 2022 ===
- A Night of Knowing Nothing (best directing)
- Rojek (best cinematography)
