= Assassins (2020 film) =

- Theatrical release poster
- Directed by: Ryan White
- Produced by: Ryan White; Jessica Hargrave
- Cinematography: John Benam
- Edited by: Helen Kearns
- Music by: Blake Neely
- Production company: Tripod Media
- Distributed by: Greenwich Entertainment
- Release dates: January 26, 2020 (Sundance); December 11, 2020 (United States)
- Running time: 104 minutes
- Country: United States
- Languages: English; Indonesian; Vietnamese; Malay
- Box office: $36,390

Assassins is a 2020 American documentary film, directed and produced by Ryan White. It talks about the assassination of Kim Jong-nam and the two assassins who were tricked.

The film had its world premiere at the Sundance Film Festival on January 26, 2020. It was released on December 11, 2020, by Greenwich Entertainment.

== Synopsis ==
The film follows the assassination of Kim Jong-nam, as he is assassinated by two young women who were tricked and thought they were participating in a prank show.

== Release ==
The film had its world premiere at the Sundance Film Festival on January 26, 2020. Shortly after, Magnolia Pictures acquired distribution rights to the film. Due to the subject matter, the film struggled to find distribution, with Magnolia opting to release the film internationally instead, and Hulu acquiring rights to the film before dropping it. In September 2020, Greenwich Entertainment acquired U.S. distribution rights to the film. It was released on December 11, 2020. In June 2021, Assassins was granted art movie status following an initial rejection by the Korean Film Council (KOFIC) in May 2021.

== Reception ==
=== Critical reception ===
Assassins received positive reviews from film critics. It holds a 98% approval rating on the review aggregator website Rotten Tomatoes, based on 42 reviews, with an average of 7.9/10. The site's critical consensus reads, "A deft and illuminating journalistic investigation, Assassins depicts the mechanics of North Korean politics to a chilling effect." On Metacritic, the film holds a rating of 74 out of 100, based on 13 critics, indicating "generally favorable" reviews.
