= Gabriela Osio Vanden =

Canadian film and television director

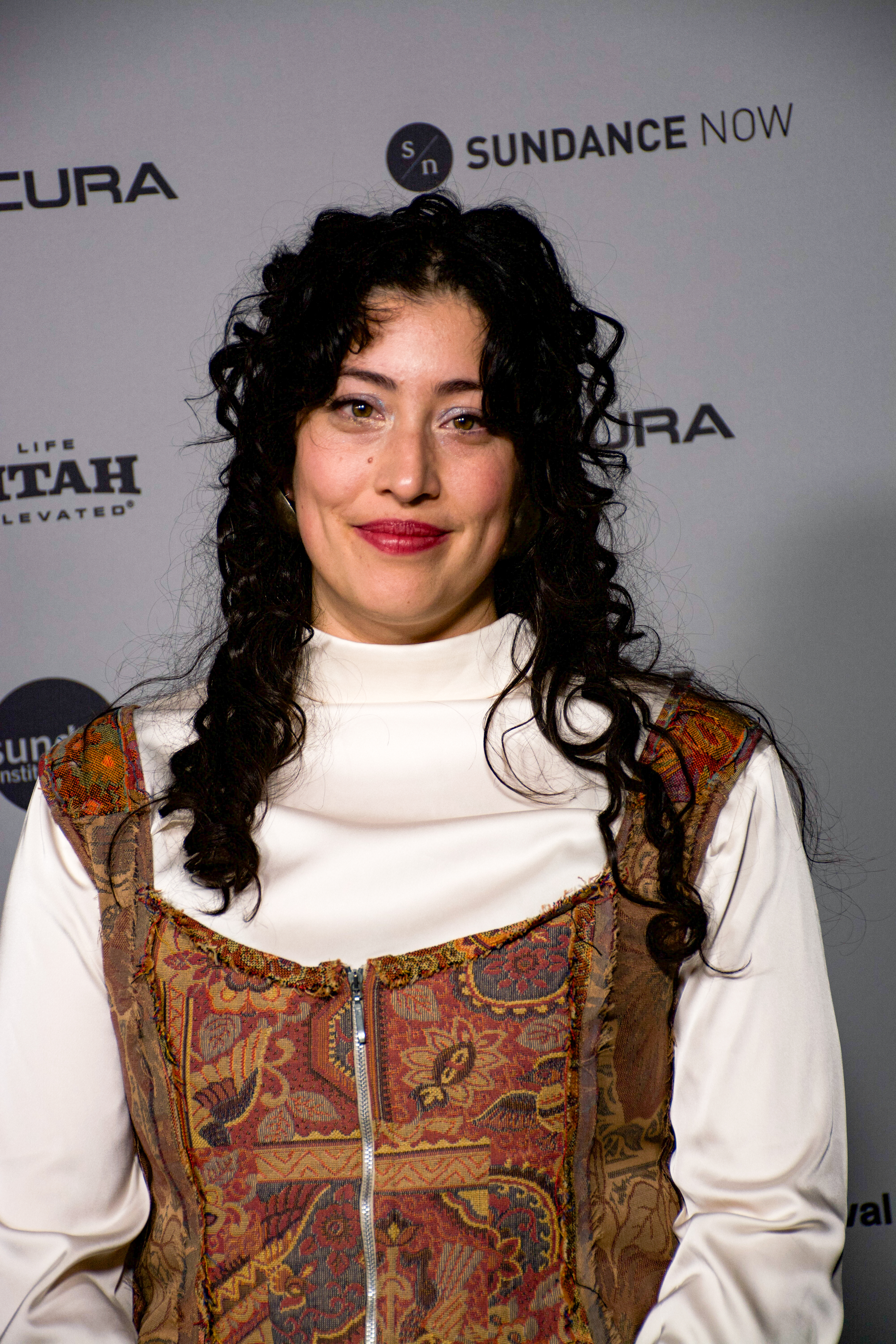
- Gabriela Osio Vanden at the 2026 Sundance Film Festival
- Occupations: Filmmaker, cinematographer
- Years active: 2010s–present
- Spouse: Jack Weisman

Gabriela Osio Vanden is a Canadian documentary filmmaker and cinematographer, who works commonly but not exclusively as a duo with her husband Jack Weisman. They are most noted for their 2021 short documentary film Nuisance Bear and its 2026 feature expansion Nuisance Bear.

Raised in Ottawa, Ontario, she is of Venezuelan descent. She met Weisman when they were both film students at York University, with the couple officially marrying in 2026 while at the 2026 Sundance Film Festival for the premiere of the feature version of Nuisance Bear.

== Filmography ==
=== Director ===
- Nuisance Bear - 2021
- Nuisance Bear - 2026

=== Cinematographer ===
- Interview with the Bigfoot - 2014
- Jew Girl #2 - 2015
- Snip - 2017
- His Nose, Her Eyes, Whose Face? - 2018
- Muse/Maestro - 2018
- Sad Kids - 2019
- Volcano - 2019
- Tallawah Abroad: Remembering Little Jamaica - 2019
- Suzanne - 2019
- Woman Dress - 2019
- Deshawn - 2020
- Meilleur avant - 2020
- Joey - 2020
- Kilométro 126 - 2020
- Bing! Bang! Bi! - 2020
- Nuisance Bear - 2021
- On the Fringe of Wild - 2021
- La Cumbre - 2021
- Things We Feel But Do Not Say - 2021
- Between Realities on the Edge of Time - 2021
- Proximity - 2021
- Zarqa - 2022
- Saturday Fuego Diablo - 2022
- Zik - 2022
- Richard and Matt and Mary - 2022
- Cassandra - 2023
- Dolce Casa - 2023
- Dirty Bad Wrong - 2023
- Erase and Rewind - 2024
- A Mother Apart - 2024
- Ernesto's Bag - 2025
- Monroe - 2025
- Don't Come Upstairs - 2025
- I Am Pleased - 2025
- Nuisance Bear - 2026
- I'm Also Here - 2026
- Man Eating Pussy - 2026

== Awards ==
Award	Year	Category	Work	Result	Ref
Toronto International Film Festival	2021	Best Canadian Short Film	Nuisance Bear with Jack Weisman	Honored	
Canadian Screen Awards	2022	Best Short Documentary	Nuisance Bear with Jack Weisman	Nominated	
Canadian Screen Awards	2026	Best Photography in a Documentary Program or Factual Series	Don't Come Upstairs	Nominated	
Regard	2022	Best Documentary Short Film	Nuisance Bear with Jack Weisman	Won	
Canadian Film Festival	2022	Best Cinematography in a Short Film	Nuisance Bear with Jack Weisman, Sam Holling	Won	
Critics' Choice Documentary Awards	2022	Best Cinematography	Nuisance Bear with Jack Weisman, Sam Holling	Nominated	
Reelworld Film Festival	2022	Outstanding Short Film Cinematographer	Saturday Fuego Diablo	Won	
Cinema Eye Honors	2023	Outstanding Non-Fiction Short	Nuisance Bear with Jack Weisman	Won	
Sundance Film Festival	2026	Grand Jury Prize, U.S. Documentary	Nuisance Bear with Jack Weisman	Won	
