= Dawn Sutter Madell =

Music writer and supervisor from Brooklyn New York, USA

Dawn Sutter Madell is a music writer and co-owner of Agoraphone, a company that does music supervision, licensing, and original music production for commercials, television and film.

Madell has worked with brands such as FedEx, Samsung, and Audi. She was the music supervisor for the 2020 film Ma Rainey's Black Bottom. Branford Marsalis called her "the music whisperer for the film." Madell's Agoraphone was the music company for Hewlett-Packard's television commercial "Jane" which won multiple awards in 2016 including a CLIO and the Cannes Lions International Festival of Creativity. They also did the music for Audi's 2016 Super Bowl ad featuring David Bowie's song Starman. Her musical score for The World Made Straight was called "the perfect blend of Appalachian folk music and country tunes." Maddell worked with Soundwalk Collective to create the soundtrack for the Peabody Award-winning documentary film All the Beauty and the Bloodshed, which was released in 2022.

Madell often discusses music licensing issues in the larger world, explaining the ins and outs of commercial licensing. Dawn Sutter Madell is a graduate of Washington University in St. Louis where she was a DJ for KWUR.

== Personal life ==
Madell married Josh Madell, co-owner of Other Music, in May 1999. They live in Brooklyn.
