= Sonalee Rashatwar =

Author, podcaster, and activist

- Born: 1987 or 1988 (age 38–39); New Jersey, U.S.
- Occupations: Social worker, sex therapist, adjunct lecturer, activist

Sonalee Rashatwar is an American author, podcaster, and activist. They write about fatness, fat acceptance, and anti-fat bias, and have given talks about sexuality, fat positivity, disability justice, and racism. Rashatwar is nonbinary.

In 2023, Rashatwar came under fire for comments made in the BBC documentary We Need to Talk About Cosby, where they suggested that men with a "fetish" for sex with unconscious partners could explore this consensually by paying women to be drugged—remarks some condemned as promoting rape culture.
