= We Need to Talk About Cosby =

- Genre: Documentary
- Directed by: W. Kamau Bell
- Country of origin: United States
- Original language: English
- No. of episodes: 4

Production
- Executive producers: W. Kamau Bell; Andrew Fried; Katie A. King; Dane Lillegard; Jordan Wynn; Sarina Roma; Vinnie Malhotra
- Running time: 58–60 minutes
- Production companies: Showtime Documentary Films; Boardwalk Pictures; WKB Industries

Original release
- Network: Showtime
- Release: January 30 – February 20, 2022

We Need to Talk About Cosby is an American documentary miniseries directed and produced by W. Kamau Bell. It explores the life and career of Bill Cosby up to his sexual assault cases, through conversations with comedians, journalists, and survivors. It premiered on January 30, 2022, on Showtime.

== Episodes ==
No.	Title	Directed by	Original release date	U.S. viewers (millions)
1	"Part 1"	W. Kamau Bell	January 30, 2022	0.166
While discussing the world Cosby began performing in, it notes how Cosby went from a performer who talked about race in the vein of Dick Gregory into somebody declared "raceless" by the media. It also covers his time on I Spy, especially his fight to get non-white stuntmen, and his early obsession with Spanish Fly. Victoria Valentino recounts her alleged experience of being sexually assaulted by Cosby.
2	"Part 2"	W. Kamau Bell	February 6, 2022 (Note: Part 2 was released on Showtime's on-demand and streaming platforms on January 30, 2022, ahead of its weekly premiere.)	0.184
Cosby's successful career as a children's educator, specifically in the form of Picture Pages and Fat Albert and the Cosby Kids, causes many to take note of him, while his attempts at becoming a movie star result in little success. Bill Cosby: Himself brings Cosby back to the world of stand-up comedy, and its status as a massive hit not only provides a new persona for Cosby as a middle-aged fatherly figure, but also allows him to create The Cosby Show.
3	"Part 3"	W. Kamau Bell	February 13, 2022 (Note: Part 3 was released on Showtime's on-demand and streaming platforms on January 30, 2022, ahead of its weekly premiere.)	0.126
The Cosby Show has a successful run on television, launching Cosby to a super-stardom he would spend many years with. African-American viewers in particular gravitate towards the show as an escapist program that presents a world where race doesn't matter. The Murder of Ennis Cosby creates a new Cosby, eventually leading to the Pound Cake speech, which happened at the same time as Andrea Constand's allegations against him.
4	"Part 4"	W. Kamau Bell	February 20, 2022 (Note: Part 4 was released on Showtime's on-demand and streaming platforms on January 30, 2022, ahead of its weekly premiere.)	0.145
Hannibal Buress brings the allegations against Cosby to light through his stand-up comedy, and the black community--along with America in general--have to figure out what they think of somebody once thought of as "America's Dad."

== Release ==
The series had its world premiere at the 2022 Sundance Film Festival on January 22, 2022. It was released on January 30, 2022, on Showtime.

== Reception ==
=== Critical reception ===
On the review aggregator website Rotten Tomatoes, 99% of 69 critics' reviews are positive, with an average rating of 8.5/10. The website's consensus reads: "W. Kamau Bell deftly unpacks the Cosby scandal by allowing the conversation to be uncomfortable, yielding a robust examination of the disgraced entertainer and the culture that enabled him." Metacritic, which uses a weighted average, assigned the series a score of 83 out of 100 based on 22 critics, indicating "universal acclaim".

=== Cosby's response ===
A representative for Cosby issued the following statement days prior to the premiere:

Mr. Cosby has spent more than 50 years standing with the excluded; made it possible for some to be included; standing with the disenfranchised; and standing with those women and men who were denied respectful work because of race and gender within the expanses of the entertainment industries, continues to be the target of numerous media that have, for too many years, distorted and omitted truths... intentionally. Mr. Cosby vehemently denies all allegations waged against him. Let's talk about Bill Cosby. He wants our nation to be what it proclaims itself to be: a democracy.

=== BBC Airing Controversy ===
Following the documentary's airing on BBC, many took issue with a statement from one of the film's contributors, Sonalee Rashatwar which saw them claiming a consensual way to do what Cosby did existed and that "sex negativity" is largely responsible for these situations, which many condemned as promoting rape culture.

=== Accolades ===
Year	Award	Category	Nominee(s)	Result	Ref.
2022	Peabody Awards	Documentary honoree	We Need to Talk About Cosby	Won	
2022	Black Reel Awards for Television	Outstanding Television Documentary or Special	We Need to Talk About Cosby	Won	
2022	Cinema Eye Honours	Outstanding Nonfiction Series	We Need to Talk About Cosby	Nominated	
2022	Cinema Eye Honours	Outstanding Broadcast Editing	Meg Ramsay	Won	
2022	Critics' Choice Documentary Awards	Best Limited Documentary Series	We Need to Talk About Cosby	Nominated	
2022	Gotham Independent Film Awards	Breakthrough Nonfiction Series	We Need to Talk About Cosby	Won	
2022	Hollywood Critics Association TV Awards	Best Streaming Docuseries or Non-Fiction Series	We Need to Talk About Cosby	Won	
2022	Primetime Emmy Awards	Outstanding Documentary or Nonfiction Series	W. Kamau Bell, Andrew Fried, Katie A King, Vinnie Malhotra, Dane Lillegard, Sarina Roma, Jordan Wynn, Geraldine L. Porras, and Erik Adolphson	Nominated	
2022	Primetime Emmy Awards	Outstanding Narrator	W. Kamau Bell (for "Part 1")	Nominated	
2022	Primetime Emmy Awards	Outstanding Directing for a Documentary/Nonfiction Program	W. Kamau Bell (for "Part 1")	Nominated	
2022	Primetime Emmy Awards	Outstanding Picture Editing for a Nonfiction Program	Meg Ramsay and Jennifer Brooks (for "Part 1")	Nominated	
2022	Television Critics Association Awards	Outstanding Achievement in News and Information	We Need to Talk About Cosby	Nominated	
