= Jack Weisman =

Canadian film and television director

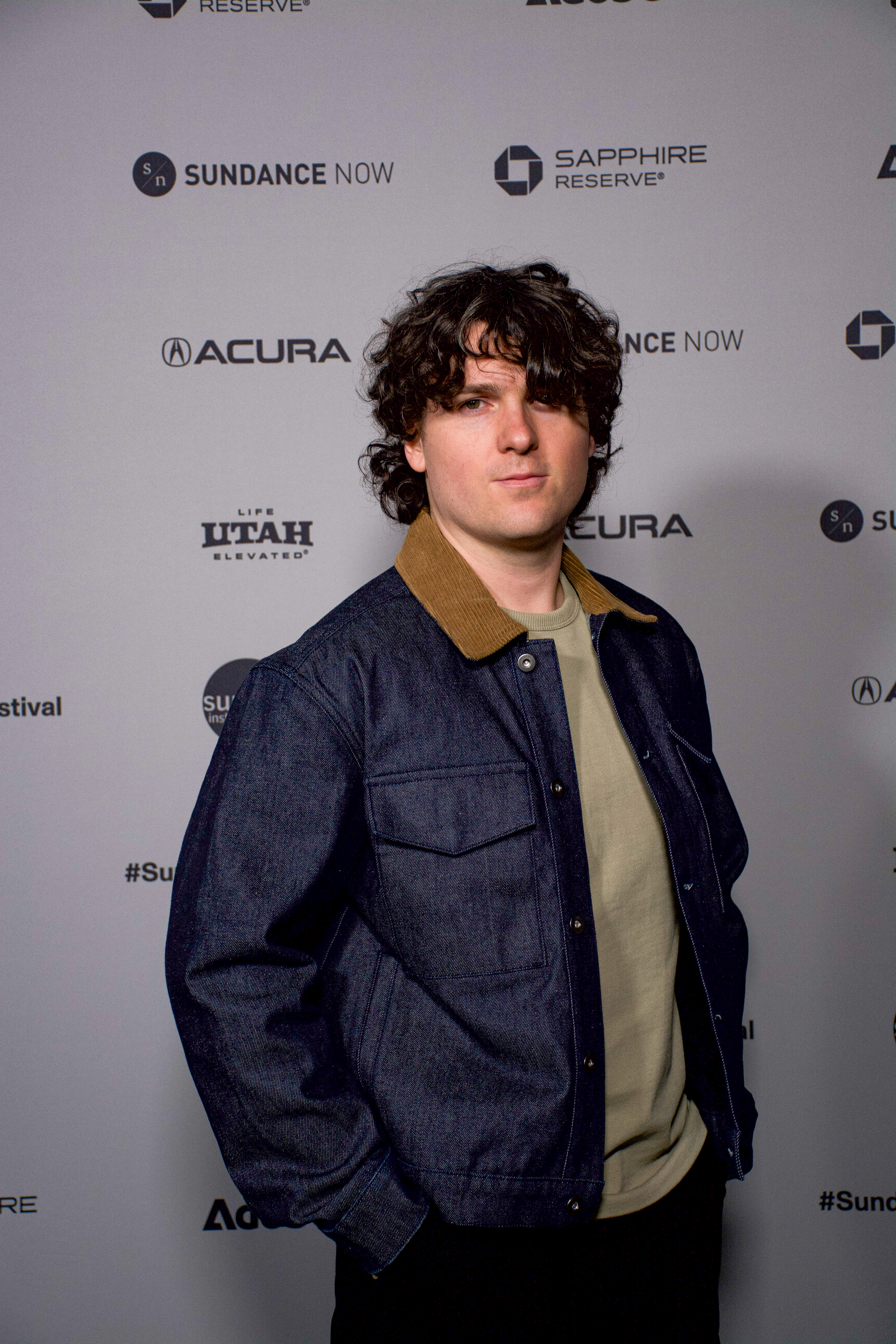
- Jack Weisman at the 2026 Sundance Film Festival
- Occupations: Filmmaker, cinematographer
- Years active: 2016–present
- Spouse: Gabriela Osio Vanden

Jack Weisman is an American-Canadian documentary filmmaker and cinematographer, who works commonly but not exclusively as a duo with his wife Gabriela Osio Vanden. They are most noted for their 2021 short documentary film Nuisance Bear and its 2026 feature expansion Nuisance Bear.

Raised in Ithaca, New York, he subsequently moved to Toronto to study film, eventually becoming a Canadian citizen. He met Vanden when they were both film students at York University, with the couple officially marrying at an impromptu ceremony inside the historic Egyptian Theatre while at the 2026 Sundance Film Festival for the premiere of the feature version of Nuisance Bear.

== Filmography ==
=== Director ===
- The Changing Place of Making - 2014
- Nuisance Bear - 2021
- Nuisance Bear - 2026

=== Cinematographer ===
- Ráfagas de Paz - 2014
- The Changing Place of Making - 2014
- Take a Walk on the Wildside - 2017
- The Terrorist Hunter - 2018
- My Dear Kyrgyzstan - 2019
- Our Dance of Revolution - 2019
- Meilleur avant - 2020
- Nuisance Bear - 2021
- Zik - 2022
- Les Zultras - 2024
- Nuisance Bear - 2026
- Murder 101 - 2026

== Awards ==
Award	Year	Category	Work	Result	Ref
Toronto International Film Festival	2021	Best Canadian Short Film	Nuisance Bear with Gabriela Osio Vanden	Honored	
Canadian Screen Awards	2022	Best Short Documentary	Nuisance Bear with Gabriela Osio Vanden	Nominated	
Regard	2022	Best Documentary Short Film	Nuisance Bear with Gabriela Osio Vanden	Won	
Regard	2022	FIPRESCI Prize Best Short Film	Nuisance Bear with Gabriela Osio Vanden	Won	
IDA Documentary Awards	2022	Best Short Documentary	Nuisance Bear with Gabriela Osio Vanden	Nominated	
IDA Documentary Awards	2022	Pare Lorentz Award	Nuisance Bear with Gabriela Osio Vanden	Honored	
Critics' Choice Documentary Awards	2022	Best Science/Nature Documentary	Nuisance Bear with Gabriela Osio Vanden	Nominated	
Critics' Choice Documentary Awards	2022	Best Cinematography	Nuisance Bear with Gabriela Osio Vanden	Nominated	
Critics' Choice Documentary Awards	2022	Best Short Documentary	Nuisance Bear with Gabriela Osio Vanden	Won	
Cinema Eye Honors	2023	Outstanding Non-Fiction Short	Nuisance Bear with Gabriela Osio Vanden	Won	
The Academy Awards	2023	Best Documentary Film	Nuisance Bear with Gabriela Osio Vanden	Shortlisted	
Sundance Film Festival	2026	Grand Jury Prize, U.S. Documentary	Nuisance Bear with Gabriela Osio Vanden	Won	
