= Nixonland =

Work of history by Rick Perlstein

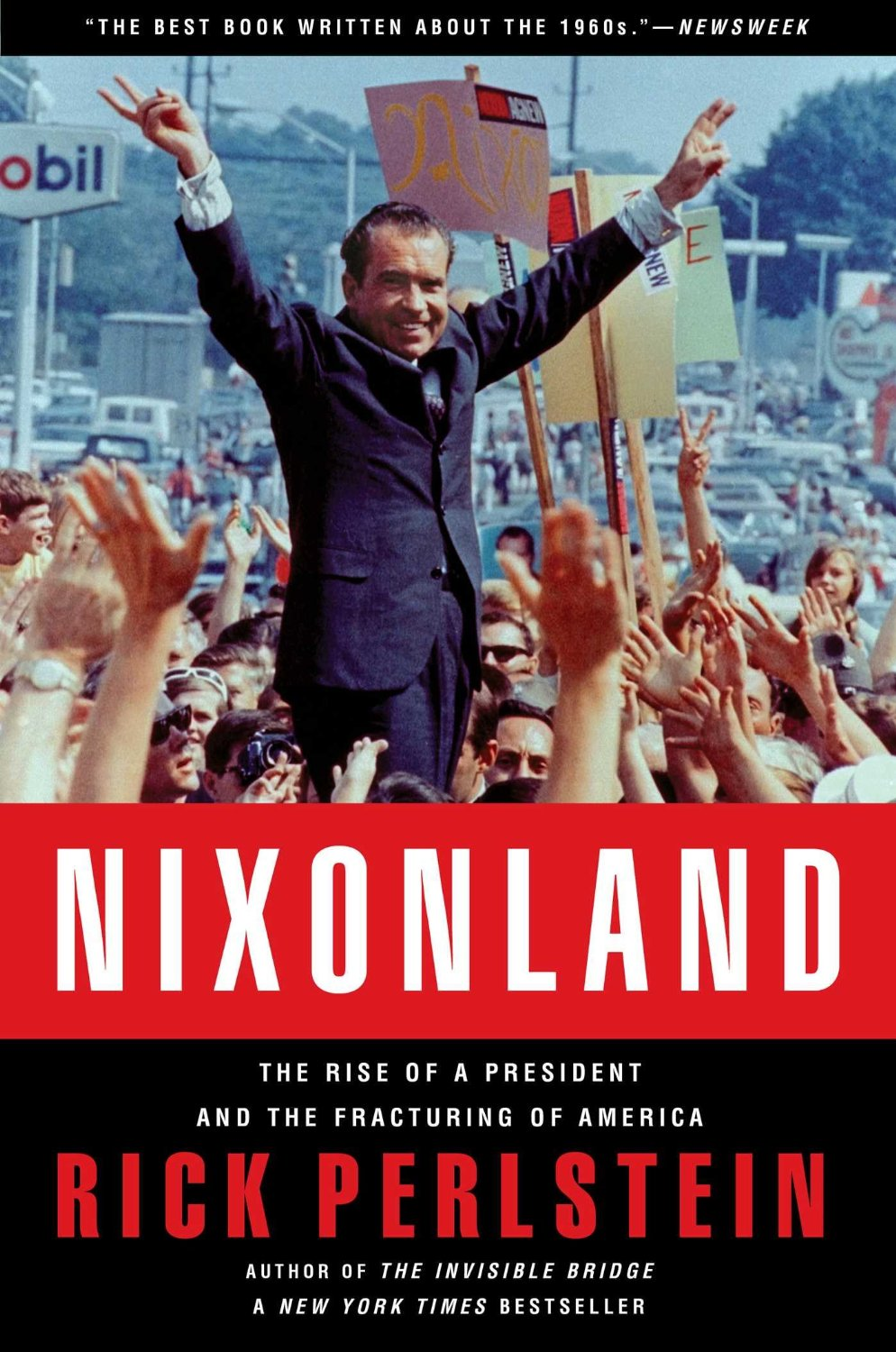
- The cover features a photo by Oliver F. Atkins of Nixon doing the V sign during his 1968 presidential campaign
- Author: Rick Perlstein
- Published: Scribner, 2008
- Publication place: United States
- Pages: 896
- ISBN: 0743243021
- OCLC: 180755987
- Dewey Decimal: 973.924
- Preceded by: Before the Storm
- Followed by: The Invisible Bridge

Nixonland: The Rise of a President and the Fracturing of America is a history book written by Rick Perlstein, released in May 2008.

== Summary ==
Perlstein's thesis is that Richard Nixon manipulated the political and social events between 1965 and 1972 in a way that shaped the political divisions of the present day. As quoted by a reviewer in The Nation, the titular "Nixonland" is where "two separate and irreconcilable sets of apocalyptic fears coexist in the minds of two separate and irreconcilable groups of Americans." The author frames the divisions of the 1960s as between the "Franklins" and the "Orthogonians", names taken from two social clubs at Nixon's alma mater of Whittier College; the Franklins were the privileged elite, and the Orthogonians the social strivers. The author casts Nixon as the "King of the Orthogonians", who would play upon the growing resentments of "Orthogonians" nationwide (Nixon's "silent majority") to electoral success. Besides ensuring his re-election, however, Nixon's political and social maneuvering also created a deep rift in American society that persisted into the 1970s and on through the end of the century, polarizing the United States.

Perlstein also presents a broader overview of the cultural and political turmoil in 1960s America, including the 1968 Democratic Convention, but, as the book ends with Nixon's reelection in 1972, only peripherally covers Watergate.

== Reception and legacy ==
Nixonland was published to rave reviews. It was also selected as one of the three best books of the year by the editors at Amazon.com and a New York Times notable book for 2008, and has been named on year-end "best of" lists by over a dozen publications.

Filmmaker Sierra Pettengill was inspired by the book for her research on the 2022 documentary film Riotsville, U.S.A.

== See also ==
- All the President's Men - both the book and the 1976 film adaptation
