= Good Night Oppy =

2022 American documentary film

- Release poster
- Directed by: Ryan White
- Written by: Helen Kearns; Ryan White
- Produced by: Brandon Carroll; Justin Falvey; Darryl Frank; Matthew Goldberg; Jessica Hargrave; Ryan White
- Narrated by: Angela Bassett
- Cinematography: John Beck-Hofmann; David Paul Jacobson
- Edited by: Rejh Cabrera; Helen Kearns
- Music by: Blake Neely
- Production companies: Amblin Entertainment; Film 45; Tripod Media; Industrial Light & Magic
- Distributed by: Amazon Studios
- Release dates: September 3, 2022 (Telluride); November 4, 2022 (United States)
- Running time: 105 minutes
- Country: United States
- Language: English
- Box office: $3,663

Good Night Oppy is a 2022 American documentary film directed by Ryan White and narrated by Angela Bassett. It had its world premiere at the 49th Telluride Film Festival on September 3, 2022. It was released in a limited release on November 4, 2022, by Amazon Studios, prior to streaming on Prime Video on November 23, 2022.

== Synopsis ==
The film tells the story of Opportunity, nicknamed Oppy, a Mars rover launched in 2003 that was expected to operate for only 90 sols but explored Mars for nearly 15 years. The film features archival and interview footage with scientists and engineers and re-creations of the rover's treks over the Martian landscape in search of water.

== Production ==
In 2019, Film 45 partnered with Steven Spielberg's company Amblin Television to tell the story of Opportunity. In March 2020, based on the original pitch from executive producers Stephen Neely and Max Wagner, Brandon Carroll of Film 45 met with Ryan White and producer Jessica Hargrave to discuss the project. In November 2020, the filmmakers approached potential distributors with a 17-minute sizzle reel. In March 2021, it was announced that Amazon Studios, Film 45, Amblin Television and Tripod Media would be co-producing Good Night Oppy, a feature about the Mars exploration rover Opportunity. It was acquired by Amazon Studios in November 2021, and completed the following month.

The film is narrated by Angela Bassett, with visual effects work from Industrial Light & Magic, and archival footage provided by NASA and the Jet Propulsion Laboratory. It was written by director Ryan White and editor Helen Kearns.

== Music ==
The film's score is by Blake Neely. It also features the pop songs "Here Comes the Sun" by The Beatles, "Roam" by The B-52's, "SOS" by ABBA, "Walking on Sunshine" by Katrina and the Waves, and "Wake Me Up Before You Go-Go" by Wham!

== Release ==
Good Night Oppy premiered at the Telluride Film Festival on September 3, 2022, and made its international debut at the Toronto International Film Festival on September 12, 2022. It was released in US theaters on November 4, 2022, and began streaming on Prime Video on November 23, 2022.

== Reception ==
On Rotten Tomatoes, the film holds an approval rating of 87% based on 92 reviews, with an average rating of 7.4/10. The website's critics consensus reads: "There are more illuminating documentaries about space exploration, but that doesn't diminish Good Night Oppy's infectious awe of the cosmos." On Metacritic, the film has a weighted average score of 65 out of 100, based on 20 critics, indicating "generally favorable" reviews.

Ben Kenigsberg of the New York Times wrote, "While descriptions of the aging robots as experiencing arthritis and memory loss are perhaps too cute, by the end of 'Good Night Oppy,' Opportunity and Spirit have become no less lovable as characters than R2-D2 or Wall-E." Michael O'Sullivan of The Washington Post awarded it two and a half out of four stars, writing, "It's such a feel-good little story that Oppy might instill in you the same warm and fuzzy feeling of gratification that she obviously has in her NASA family."

Aurora Amidon of Paste wrote that the film is "sentimental but rarely over the top, dazzling to look at, frequently dabbles in the realm of the nail-biting thriller and, on top of all that, it's highly informative." Matt Zoller Seitz of RogerEbert.com gave the film three out of four stars, writing, "To get across the magnitude of what his subjects saw and did, White pours on the commercial filmmaking devices from start to finish, in the manner of fun-for-all-ages summer blockbusters that used to dominate the box office in the 1980s and '90s," adding that "the score by Blake Neely has that John Williams magic-and-wonder vibe."

The film was named best documentary feature at the 7th Critics' Choice Documentary Awards.
