= Ryan White (filmmaker) =

American documentary producer and director

- White in 2025
- Born: Dunwoody, Georgia, U.S.
- Education: Duke University
- Occupation: Documentary filmmaker
- Years active: 2004–present

Ryan White is an American documentary producer and director best known for his Netflix documentary film Pamela, a Love Story, Amazon Prime's Good Night Oppy, which won five Critics Choice Awards including Best Documentary and Best Director, and his Emmy-nominated Netflix series The Keepers. In 2026, he was nominated for the Academy Award for Best Documentary Feature Film for Come See Me in the Good Light, about American poet and activist Andrea Gibson.

White's previous films include the HBO movie The Case Against 8, which won Sundance's Directing Award and was nominated for two Emmys, the documentary film Ask Dr. Ruth, and Coded, which was shortlisted for the Academy Award.

== Career ==
Ryan White was born and raised in Dunwoody, Georgia, United States, and graduated from Duke University with a Certificate in Documentary Studies. In 2007, White co-founded Tripod Media with his best friend and producing partner, Jessica Hargrave.

In 2010, White made his directorial debut with Pelada (PBS, Cinetic), a journey around the world through the lens of pick-up soccer. This was followed by his 2013 film Good Ol' Freda (Magnolia Pictures), which tells the story of the Beatles' longtime secretary Freda Kelly.

White directed the HBO Documentary film The Case Against 8 in 2014, a behind-the-scenes look inside the five-year battle to overturn California's ban on same-sex marriage, and was shortlisted for an Academy Award, nominated for two Emmys and won Sundance's Directing Award. That year White was named a United States Artists (USA) Fellow along with Ben Cotner, his co-director on the film.

In 2016, White directed the EPIX documentary Serena, which followed tennis star Serena Williams during her 2015 tennis tour. Serena received two Realscreen awards, including the Award of Excellence.

White directed Netflix's Emmy-nominated The Keepers in 2017, a seven-part docuseries which investigates the unsolved murder of a young nun in Baltimore and the horrific secrets and pain that linger nearly five decades after her death. The series won a Cinema Eye Honors Award for Outstanding Achievement in Broadcast Nonfiction Filmmaking and was supported by the Sundance Institute.

In 2019, he directed the documentary film Ask Dr. Ruth. The film follows German-American sex therapist Ruth Westheimer (Dr. Ruth) as she reflects on her life and career. The film's title derives from the name of Westheimer's syndicated 1987 late-night television series Ask Dr. Ruth. The film premiered at the 2019 Sundance Film Festival. Ask Dr. Ruth won Best Documentary Feature at the Calgary Underground Film Festival, and was nominated for Best Documentary at the Hot Docs Canadian International Documentary Festival and Miami International Film Festival.

In 2020, White directed Assassins, a feature film about the assassination of Kim Jong-nam, the half brother of the North Korean leader, which premiered at the Sundance Film Festival to rave reviews. Assassins was nominated for an Emmy for Outstanding Investigative Documentary.

White also directed the five-part series Visible: Out on Television, the first documentary series on Apple TV+, which explores the history of the LGBTQ movement through the lens of television. Produced by Wilson Cruz and Wanda Sykes, the series combines archival footage with new interviews to look at homophobia, the evolution of LGBTQ characters, and coming out in the TV world. In June 2020, in honor of the 50th anniversary of the first LGBTQ Pride parade, Queerty named White among the 50 heroes "leading the nation toward equality, acceptance, and dignity for all people".

In 2021, White directed the documentary short film Coded: The Hidden Love of J.C. Leyendecker, which tells the story of legendary illustrator J. C. Leyendecker, whose early-20th century advertisements were coded with LGBTQ imagery that quietly acknowledged a community that was forced to live in the closet. Coded was shortlisted for the Academy Award and won Best Documentary Short at the Tribeca Film Festival.

In 2022, White directed Netflix's documentary short State of Alabama vs. Brittany Smith, the story of a woman who shot and killed the man she says attacked and raped her in her home who was then prosecuted for murder by the state of Alabama. Unfolding in real-time, the film follows Brittany's self defense case and the impact in her community and beyond.

White directed Amazon's Good Night Oppy, which premiered at the Telluride Film Festival in September 2022, and won five Critics Choice Awards including Best Documentary Feature and Best Director at the Critics' Choice Documentary Awards. The film tells the inspirational true story of Opportunity, a rover that was sent to Mars for a 90-day mission but ended up surviving for 15 years. The film follows Opportunity's groundbreaking journey on Mars and the remarkable bond forged between a robot and her humans millions of miles away.

White directed the documentary Pamela, a Love Story, an intimate and sincere portrait of Pamela Anderson following the trajectory of her life and career from smalltown girl to international sex symbol, actress, activist, and doting mother. Pamela, a Love Story was released on Netflix on January 31, 2023 and was a top 10 international film on the streaming service.

White directed the Netflix true crime documentary Into the Fire: The Lost Daughter, released on September 12, 2024.

White directed Come See Me in the Good Light, a documentary following poet and activist Andrea Gibson, their wife Megan Falley, and their examination of love and mortality after Gibson is diagnosed with terminal ovarian cancer. The film premiered at the 2025 Sundance Film Festival, where it won the Festival Favorite Award.

== Accolades ==
=== Academy Awards ===
| Year | Category | Work | Result | Ref. |
|---|---|---|---|---|
| 2026 | Best Documentary Feature Film | Come See Me in the Good Light | Nominated | |

=== Emmy Awards ===
| Year | Category | Work | Result | Ref. |
Primetime Emmy Awards
| 2015 | Outstanding Documentary or Nonfiction Special | The Case Against 8 | Nominated | |
| 2017 | Outstanding Documentary or Nonfiction Special | The Keepers | Nominated | |
| 2025 | Outstanding Documentary or Nonfiction Special | Pamela, a Love Story | Nominated | |
News & Documentary Emmy Awards
| 2023 | Outstanding Writing: Documentary | Good Night Oppy | Won | |

=== Other awards and nominations ===
| Award | Year | Category | Work(s) | Result | Ref. |
|---|---|---|---|---|---|
| Austin Film Critics Association | 2025 | Best Documentary Film | Come See Me in the Good Light | Nominated | |
| Boulder International Film Festival | 2025 | Peoples Choice Award - Feature Length Film | Come See Me in the Good Light | Won | |
| Boulder International Film Festival | 2025 | Best Feature Documentary | Come See Me in the Good Light | Won | |
| Cleveland International Film Festival | 2013 | Roxanne T. Mueller Audience Choice Award for Best Film | Good Ol' Freda | Won | |
| Cleveland International Film Festival | 2014 | Someone to Watch Award | Himself | Won | |
| Cleveland International Film Festival | 2025 | Roxanne T. Mueller Audience Choice Award for Best Film | Come See Me in the Good Light | Won | |
| Cleveland International Film Festival | 2025 | Best Documentary | Come See Me in the Good Light | Nominated | |
| Cleveland International Film Festival | 2025 | Honorable Mention – Documentary Competition | Himself | Honor | |
| Critics' Choice Documentary Award | 2022 | Best Director | Good Night Oppy | Won | |
| Critics' Choice Documentary Award | 2022 | Best Narration | Good Night Oppy | Won | |
| Dallas–Fort Worth Film Critics Association | 2025 | Best Documentary | Come See Me in the Good Light | Nominated | |
| Hot Docs Canadian International Documentary Festival | 2025 | Audience Award | Come See Me in the Good Light | Won | |
| Independent Spirit Awards | 2026 | Best Documentary Feature | Come See Me in the Good Light | Nominated | |
| International Documentary Association | 2017 | Best Limited Series | The Keepers | Nominated | |
| International Documentary Association | 2025 | Honorable Mention in Feature Documentaries | Come See Me in the Good Light | Pending | |
| Melbourne International Film Festival | 2014 | Best Documentary | The Case Against 8 | Nominated | |
| Miami Film Festival | 2019 | Best Documentary | Ask Dr. Ruth | Nominated | |
| Nashville Film Festival | 2014 | Best Documentary | The Case Against 8 | Won | |
| National Board of Review Awards | 2025 | Top 5 Documentaries | Come See Me in the Good Light | 3rd Place | |
| Philadelphia Film Festival | 2022 | Student Choice Award - Documentary | Good Night Oppy | Nominated | |
| Philadelphia Film Festival | 2022 | Honorable Mention - Documentary | Good Night Oppy | Won | |
| San Francisco International Film Festival | 2025 | Best Documentary Feature | Come See Me in the Good Light | Won | |
| Satellite Awards | 2026 | Best Documentary Film | Come See Me in the Good Light | Pending | |
| Seattle International Film Festival | 2014 | Best Documentary | The Case Against 8 | Nominated | |
| Seattle International Film Festival | 2025 | Best Documentary | Come See Me in the Good Light | Won | |
| Seattle International Film Festival | 2025 | Best Director | Come See Me in the Good Light | Nominated | |
| Stockholm Film Festival | 2020 | Best Documentary | Assassins | Nominated | |
| Sundance Film Festival | 2014 | Grand Jury Prize - Documentary | The Case Against 8 | Nominated | |
| Sundance Film Festival | 2014 | Directing Award - Documentary | The Case Against 8 | Won | |
| Sundance Film Festival | 2026 | Festival Favorite Award | Come See Me in the Good Light | Won | |
| Tribeca Film Festival | 2021 | Best Documentary Short | Coded | Won | |
| Toronto Film Critics Association | 2026 | Allan King Documentary Award | Himself | Won | |
| Virginia Film Festival | 2025 | Audience Award – Documentary Feature | Come See Me in the Good Light | Won | |
| Virginia Film Festival | 2025 | Chronicler Award | Jessica Hargrave | Won | |
| Washington DC Area Film Critics Association Awards | 2025 | Best Documentary | Come See Me in the Good Light | Nominated | |
