= Payal Kapadia (filmmaker) =

Indian filmmaker

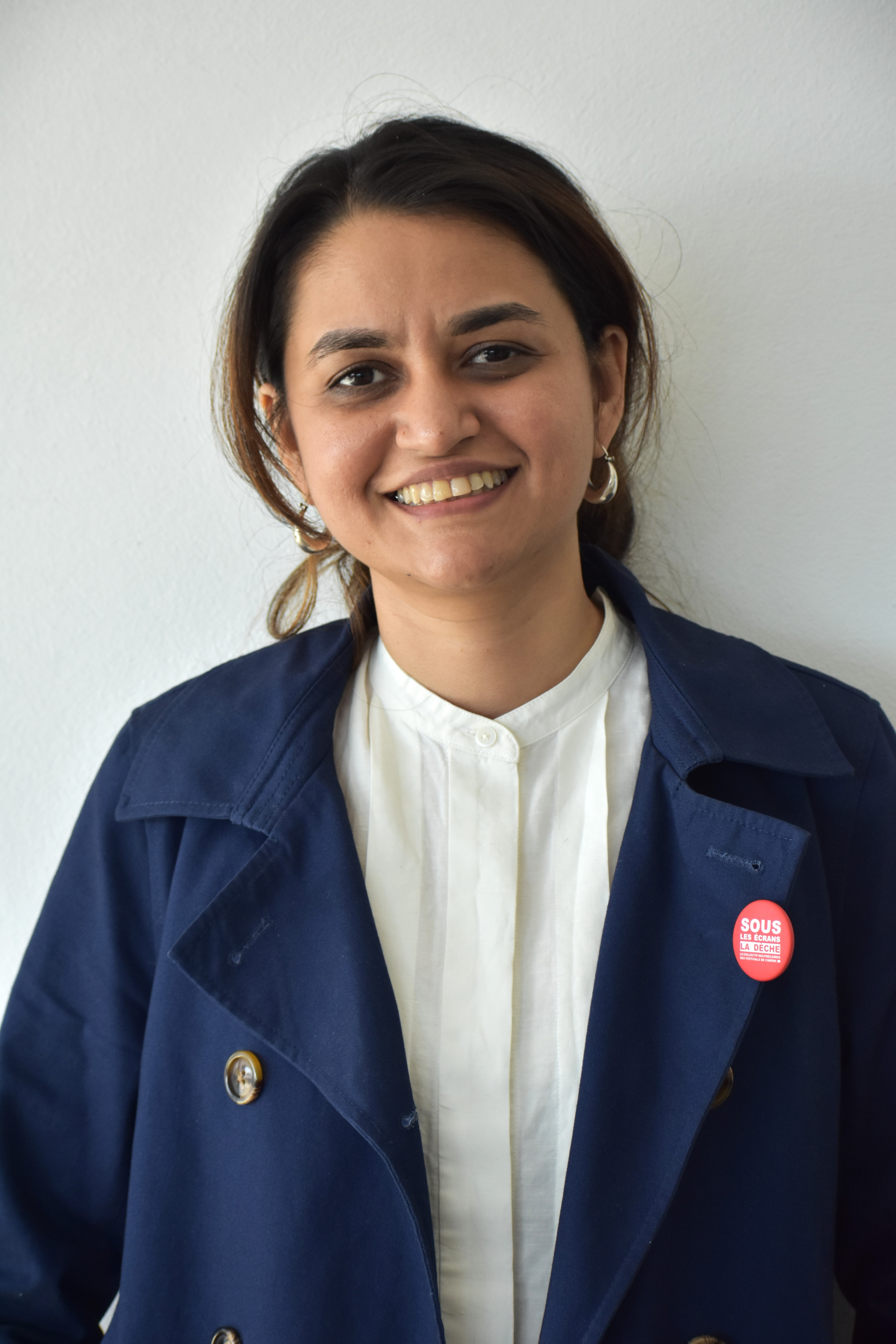
- Payal Kapadia at 2024 Cannes Film Festival
- Born: 4 January 1986 (age 40); Mumbai, India
- Education: Film and Television Institute of India
- Occupations: Film director; screenwriter
- Years active: 2014–present

Payal Kapadia (born 4 January 1986) is an Indian filmmaker. In 2017, her short film Afternoon Clouds was the only Indian film selected for the 70th Cannes Film Festival. In 2021, she won the Golden Eye award for best documentary film at the 74th Cannes Film Festival for her debut feature A Night of Knowing Nothing.

In 2024, she won the Grand Prix at the 77th Cannes Film Festival for her fiction feature debut All We Imagine as Light. It also earned her a nomination for the Golden Globe Award for Best Director.

== Early life and education ==
Payal Kapadia was born in Mumbai on 4 January 1986 to painter and video artist Nalini Malani and psychoanalyst Shailesh Kapadia.

Kapadia went to Rishi Valley School, a boarding school in Andhra Pradesh. Here she had her first exposure to avant-garde filmmakers like Ritwik Ghatak and Andrei Tarkovsky, as she was part of the school's film club. She studied at St. Xavier's College, Mumbai, and also earned a one-year master's degree from Sophia College for Women.

She then went on to study film direction at the Film and Television Institute of India, where she was selected on her second attempt in 2012. In between for five years she worked in Mumbai, in advertising and assisting a video artist.

== Career ==
In 2017, Kapadia's short film Afternoon Clouds was the only Indian film selected for the 70th Cannes Film Festival.

In 2021, she won the Golden Eye award for best documentary film at the 74th Cannes Film Festival for her debut feature A Night of Knowing Nothing.

In 2024, Kapadia won the Grand Prix at the 77th Cannes Film Festival for her fiction feature debut All We Imagine as Light. It also earned her nominations for the Golden Globe Award for Best Director and the BAFTA Award for Best Film Not in the English Language.

In 2025, Kapadia was invited to serve as a jury member at the 78th Cannes Film Festival. She was also invited to join the Writers Branch of the Academy of Motion Picture Arts and Sciences. She is a signatory of the Film Workers for Palestine boycott pledge that was published in September 2025.

== Filmography ==
† indicates documentary film
Year	Title	Credited as			Notes
Year	Title	Director	Writer	Other	Notes
2014	Watermelon, Fish and Half Ghost	Yes	No	No	Short film
2015	The Last Mango Before the Monsoon	Yes	Yes	Editor	Short film
2017	Afternoon Clouds	Yes	Yes	No	Short film
2018	And What is the Summer Saying †	Yes	Yes	No	Short film
2021	A Night of Knowing Nothing †	Yes	Yes	No	
2024	All We Imagine as Light	Yes	Yes	No	

== Accolades ==
Award	Year	Category	Work	Result	Ref.
Asian Film Awards	2025	Best Film	All We Imagine as Light	Won	
Asian Film Awards	2025	Best Director	All We Imagine as Light	Nominated	
Asian Film Awards	2025	Best Screenplay	All We Imagine as Light	Nominated	
Asia Pacific Screen Awards	2021	Best Film	A Night of Knowing Nothing	Nominated	
Asia Pacific Screen Awards	2024	Best Film	All We Imagine as Light	Nominated	
Asia Pacific Screen Awards	2024	Best Director	All We Imagine as Light	Nominated	
Asia Pacific Screen Awards	2024	Best Screenplay	All We Imagine as Light	Nominated	
Asia Pacific Screen Awards	2024	Jury Grand Prize	All We Imagine as Light	Won	
British Academy Film Awards	2025	Best Film Not in the English Language	All We Imagine as Light	Nominated	
British Independent Film Awards	2024	Best International Independent Film	All We Imagine as Light	Nominated	
Cahiers du Cinéma	2024	Annual Top 10	All We Imagine as Light	5th Place	
Camden International Film Festival	2021	Cinematic Vision Award	A Night of Knowing Nothing	Won	
Cannes Film Festival	2021	Caméra d'Or	A Night of Knowing Nothing	Nominated	
Cannes Film Festival	2021	L'Œil d'or	A Night of Knowing Nothing	Won	
Cannes Film Festival	2024	Palme d'Or	All We Imagine as Light	Nominated	
Cannes Film Festival	2024	Grand Prix	All We Imagine as Light	Won	
Cannes Film Festival	2024	Prix des Cinémas Art et Essai – Special Mention	All We Imagine as Light	Won	
Chicago Film Critics Association	2024	Milos Stehlik Award for Breakthrough Filmmaker	All We Imagine as Light	Nominated	
Chicago International Film Festival	2024	Silver Hugo – Jury Prize	All We Imagine as Light	Won	
Cinema Eye Honors	2023	Outstanding Nonfiction Feature	A Night of Knowing Nothing	Nominated	
Cinema Eye Honors	2023	Outstanding Direction	A Night of Knowing Nothing	Nominated	
Cinema Eye Honors	2023	Outstanding Debut	A Night of Knowing Nothing	Nominated	
Directors Guild of America Awards	2025	Michael Apted Award for Outstanding Directorial Achievement in First-Time Theatrical Feature Film	All We Imagine as Light	Nominated	
Fribourg International Film Festival	2019	Best International Short Film Award	And What Is the Summer Saying?	Won	
Golden Globe Awards	2025	Best Director – Motion Picture	All We Imagine as Light	Nominated	
Gotham Awards	2024	Best Director	All We Imagine as Light	Nominated	
Gotham Awards	2024	Best International Feature	All We Imagine as Light	Won	
Lisbon & Estoril Film Festival	2021	Best Film Award	A Night of Knowing Nothing	Won	
Mill Valley Film Festival	2024	Mind the Gap Award	—N/a	Honored	
Mirage Film Festival	2022	MIRAGE Award – Directing	A Night of Knowing Nothing	Won	
Montclair Film Festival	2024	Fiction Feature Prize	All We Imagine as Light	Won	
National Society of Film Critics	2025	Best Director	All We Imagine as Light	Won	
National Society of Film Critics	2025	Best Foreign Language Film	All We Imagine as Light	Won	
New York Film Critics Circle	2024	Best International Film	All We Imagine as Light	Won	
San Diego Asian Film Festival	2017	Best International Short	Afternoon Clouds	Won	
San Sebastián International Film Festival	2024	RTVE-Another Look Award	All We Imagine as Light	Won	
Taiwan International Documentary Festival	2022	Merit Prize	A Night of Knowing Nothing	Won	
Toronto International Film Festival	2021	Amplify Voices Award	A Night of Knowing Nothing	Won	
Yamagata International Documentary Film Festival	2023	Robert and Frances Flaherty Prize	A Night of Knowing Nothing	Won	
