= All the Beauty and the Bloodshed =

2022 film by Laura Poitras

- Theatrical release poster
- Directed by: Laura Poitras
- Produced by: Laura Poitras; Nan Goldin; Yoni Golijov; Clare Carter; John Lyons; Howard Gertler
- Starring: Nan Goldin
- Cinematography: Nan Goldin (credited as Photography and Slideshows); Clare Carter; Robert Kolodny; Alexander W. Lewis; Laura Poitras; Sean Vegezzi; Thom Pavia
- Edited by: Amy Foote; Joe Bini; Brian A. Kates
- Music by: Soundwalk Collective; Dawn Sutter Madell
- Production companies: Praxis Films; Participant; HBO Documentary Films
- Distributed by: Neon
- Release dates: September 3, 2022 (Venice); November 23, 2022 (United States)
- Running time: 122 minutes
- Country: United States
- Language: English
- Box office: $1.7 million

All the Beauty and the Bloodshed is a 2022 American biographical documentary film about photographer, artist, and activist Nan Goldin. The film is produced, co-edited and directed by Laura Poitras, and tackles Goldin's life through her advocacy during the HIV/AIDS crisis in the ‘80s, and her fight against the Sackler family for their role in the current opioid epidemic in the United States. Poitras, a long-time friend and fan, stated that "Nan's art and vision has inspired my work for years, and has influenced generations of filmmakers."

The film premiered on September 3, 2022, at the 79th Venice International Film Festival, where it was awarded the Golden Lion, making it the second documentary (following Sacro GRA in 2013) to win the top prize at Venice. It also screened at the 2022 New York Film Festival, where it was the festival's centerpiece film and for which Goldin designed two official posters.

The film was received with critical acclaim, and was released in cinemas by Neon on November 23, 2022. At the 95th Academy Awards, the film was nominated for Best Documentary Feature. The film then went on to win a Peabody Award at the 84th ceremony for "capturing the zeal of an artist eager to use her work to create a new vision for and of the world."

== Synopsis ==
The film examines the life and career of photographer and activist Nan Goldin and her efforts to hold Purdue Pharma, owned by the Sackler family, accountable for the opioid epidemic. Goldin, a well known photographer whose work often documented the LGBT subcultures and the HIV/AIDS crisis, founded the advocacy group P.A.I.N. (Prescription Addiction Intervention Now) in 2017 after her addiction to Oxycontin, and near fatal overdose of fentanyl. P.A.I.N. specifically targets museums and other arts institutions to hold the art community accountable for its collaboration with the Sackler family and its well publicized financial support of the arts. Since P.A.I.N.'s activities most of the targeted museums have severed all ties with the Sackler family and in 2021 Purdue Pharma filed for bankruptcy.

The film is structured in seven chapters, each of which begins with a photographic sequence or archival footage of a period of Goldin's life and then transitions to footage of her recent protests with P.A.I.N. The slideshow of archival photographs is reminiscent of Goldin's work creating slideshows or series of photographs, such as The Ballad of Sexual Dependency. Footage of P.A.I.N. demonstrations include its first 2018 protest at the Metropolitan Museum of Art's Temple of Dendur as well as similar demonstrations at the Louvre and the Guggenheim Museum. Goldin is the primary narrator of the film, with additional interviews from associates such as journalist Patrick Radden Keefe and P.A.I.N. member Megan Kapler.

== Cast ==
- Nan Goldin
- Patrick Radden Keefe
- Megan Kapler
- David Velasco
- John Waters (archive footage)
- Cookie Mueller (archive footage)
- David Wojnarowicz (archive footage)

== Production ==
Goldin and two other activists had been filming their activities with P.A.I.N. for two years, intending to make a documentary about the activist group. Goldin then approached the film's production company about turning the footage into a film, and Laura Poitras was suggested to Goldin to direct the film, based on Poitras's work on Astro Noise for the Whitney Museum. Goldin was initially skeptical because of Poitras' previous political films, saying "I thought I was not going to be interesting to her because I don't have any state secrets."

Goldin has stated that most of the film's footage and photographs come directly from her. Poitras expanded on Goldin's vision for the project, and chose to make a more well-rounded film about Goldin's life and career. These biographical elements include the suicide of Goldin's sister, Goldin's drug use and her sex work activities, which she had never previously publicized, as well as her art career and achievements. Goldin initially felt uncomfortable with allowing Poitras to control the film and the depiction of her life, but was happy with the finished film. Goldin said that Poitras was "telling my story in my voice, but it's not exactly my version as I would tell it. But she's been amazing into letting me have a lot of input into what's used and not used."

== Release ==
The film premiered on September 3, 2022, at the 79th Venice International Film Festival, where it was awarded the Golden Lion. It screened at the 2022 Toronto International Film Festival on September 9. Shortly afterwards Poitras criticized both the Venice and Toronto festivals for screening a film produced by Hillary Clinton, In Her Hands. Poitras stated that she was "alarmed" by Clinton's presence at the festivals, adding "Hillary Clinton was actively involved in the wars and occupations in Iraq and Afghanistan. She supported the escalation of troops." It also screened at the 2022 New York Film Festival, where it was the festival's centerpiece film.

In August 2022, before its Venice premiere, Neon acquired the US distribution rights for the movie while the UK and Ireland rights were taken by Altitude Film Distribution. In September 2022, HBO Documentary Films acquired television and streaming rights to the film. The film was released in theaters by Neon on November 23, 2022. The film coincides with This Will Not End Well, a retrospective of Goldin's work at Stockholm's Moderna Museet which opened October 29, 2022.

== Reception ==
=== Critical response ===
On Rotten Tomatoes, the film holds an approval rating of 95% based on 145 reviews, with an average rating of 8.7/10. The website's consensus reads, "All the Beauty and the Bloodshed is a bone-deep look at a photographer's fight against addiction and the institution responsible for her pain through her gritty lens." According to Metacritic, which assigned a weighted average score of 91 out of 100 based on 34 critics, the film received "universal acclaim".

Godfrey Cheshire praised the film for being equally Poitras' and Goldin's work, stating that "there's effectively no conceptual distance between the auteur documentarian and her artist subject...the result of their sympathetic engagement is a collaboration of rare beauty and power."

On December 21, 2022, the film was shortlisted by the Academy of Motion Picture Arts and Sciences for Best Documentary Feature Film at the 95th Academy Awards. It was ultimately nominated in the category. The film won a Peabody Award for "capturing the zeal of an artist eager to use her work to create a new vision for and of the world" at the 84th ceremony on June 9, 2024.

In June 2025, IndieWire ranked the film at number 37 on its list of "The 100 Best Movies of the 2020s (So Far)."

=== Accolades ===
Award	Date of ceremony	Category	Recipient(s)	Result	Ref.
Venice Film Festival	September 10, 2022	Golden Lion	Laura Poitras	Won	
Venice Film Festival	September 10, 2022	Queer Lion	Laura Poitras	Nominated	
Venice Film Festival	September 10, 2022	Smithers Foundation Award "Ambassador of Hope"	Laura Poitras	Won	
Athens International Film Festival	October 8, 2022	Golden Athena Best Documentary Award	All the Beauty and the Bloodshed	Won	
London Film Festival	October 16, 2022	Grierson Award	All the Beauty and the Bloodshed	Nominated	
Montclair Film Festival	October 30, 2022	Bruce Sinosky Award for Documentary Feature	All the Beauty and the Bloodshed	Won	
Critics' Choice Documentary Awards	November 13, 2022	Best Political Documentary	All the Beauty and the Bloodshed	Nominated	
Critics' Choice Documentary Awards	November 13, 2022	Best Director	Laura Poitras	Nominated	
Gotham Independent Film Awards	November 28, 2022	Best Documentary	All the Beauty and the Bloodshed	Nominated	
New York Film Critics Circle Awards	December 2, 2022	Best Non-Fiction Film	All the Beauty and the Bloodshed	Won	
British Independent Film Awards	December 4, 2022	Best International Independent Film	Laura Poitras, Howard Gertler, John Lyons, Nan Goldin, Yoni Golijov	Nominated	
National Board of Review	December 8, 2022	Top Five Documentaries	All the Beauty and the Bloodshed	Won	
National Board of Review	December 8, 2022	Freedom of Expression Award	All the Beauty and the Bloodshed	Won	
New York Film Critics Online	December 11, 2022	Best Documentary Feature	All the Beauty and the Bloodshed	Won	
Los Angeles Film Critics Association	December 11, 2022	Best Documentary/Non-Fiction Film	All the Beauty and the Bloodshed	Won	
Boston Society of Film Critics	December 11, 2022	Best Documentary Film	All the Beauty and the Bloodshed	Won	
Washington D.C. Area Film Critics Association	December 12, 2022	Best Documentary	All the Beauty and the Bloodshed	Nominated	
Chicago Film Critics Association	December 14, 2022	Best Documentary Film	All the Beauty and the Bloodshed	Nominated	
St. Louis Gateway Film Critics Association	December 18, 2022	Best Documentary Film	All the Beauty and the Bloodshed	Won	
Florida Film Critics Circle	December 22, 2022	Best Documentary Film	All the Beauty and the Bloodshed	Won	
Alliance of Women Film Journalists	January 5, 2023	Best Documentary	All the Beauty and the Bloodshed	Won	
San Diego Film Critics Society	January 6, 2023	Best Documentary	All the Beauty and the Bloodshed	Nominated	
National Society of Film Critics	January 7, 2023	Best Non-Fiction Film	All the Beauty and the Bloodshed	Won	
Toronto Film Critics Association	January 8, 2023	Best Documentary Film	All the Beauty and the Bloodshed	Won	
San Francisco Bay Area Film Critics Circle	January 9, 2023	Best Documentary Feature	All the Beauty and the Bloodshed	Nominated	
Austin Film Critics Association	January 10, 2023	Best Documentary	All the Beauty and the Bloodshed	Won	
Cinema Eye Honors	January 12, 2023	Outstanding Non-Fiction Feature	Laura Poitras, Howard Gertler, John Lyons, Nan Goldin, Yoni Golijov	Nominated	
Cinema Eye Honors	January 12, 2023	Outstanding Direction	Laura Poitras	Won	
Cinema Eye Honors	January 12, 2023	Outstanding Editing	Amy Foote, Joe Bini and Brian A. Kates	Nominated	
Cinema Eye Honors	January 12, 2023	Outstanding Original Score	Soundwalk Collective	Nominated	
Cinema Eye Honors	January 12, 2023	The Unforgettables	Nan Goldin	Won	
Georgia Film Critics Association	January 13, 2023	Best Documentary Film	All the Beauty and the Bloodshed	Won	
Seattle Film Critics Society	January 17, 2023	Best Documentary Feature	All the Beauty and the Bloodshed	Nominated	
Online Film Critics Society	January 23, 2023	Best Documentary	All the Beauty and the Bloodshed	Nominated	
Houston Film Critics Society	February 18, 2023	Best Documentary Feature	All the Beauty and the Bloodshed	Nominated	
London Film Critics' Circle	February 5, 2023	Film of the Year	All the Beauty and the Bloodshed	Nominated	
London Film Critics' Circle	February 5, 2023	Documentary of the Year	All the Beauty and the Bloodshed	Won	
Satellite Awards	February 11, 2023	Best Motion Picture – Documentary	All the Beauty and the Bloodshed	Nominated	
Vancouver Film Critics Circle	February 13, 2023	Best Documentary	All the Beauty and the Bloodshed	Won	
Directors Guild of America Awards	February 18, 2023	Outstanding Directing – Documentaries	Laura Poitras	Nominated	
British Academy Film Awards	February 19, 2023	Best Documentary	Laura Poitras, Howard Gertler, Nan Goldin, Yoni Golijov, John Lyons	Nominated	
Dorian Awards	February 23, 2023	Documentary of the Year	All the Beauty and the Bloodshed	Won	
Dorian Awards	February 23, 2023	LGBTQ Documentary of the Year	All the Beauty and the Bloodshed	Won	
Hollywood Critics Association Awards	February 24, 2023	Best Documentary Film	All the Beauty and the Bloodshed	Nominated	
Independent Spirit Awards	March 4, 2023	Best Documentary Feature	Laura Poitras, Howard Gertler, Nan Goldin, Yoni Golijov, John Lyons	Won	
Academy Awards	March 12, 2023	Best Documentary Feature	Laura Poitras, Howard Gertler, Nan Goldin, Yoni Golijov, John Lyons	Nominated	
GLAAD Media Awards	March 30, 2023	Outstanding Documentary	All the Beauty and the Bloodshed	Nominated	
Golden Trailer Awards	June 29, 2023	Best Documentary – Bio Pic of an Individual	All the Beauty and the Bloodshed (Intermission Film)	Nominated	
Peabody Awards	June 9, 2024	Capturing the Zeal of an Artist Eager to Use Her Work to Create a New Vision For and Of the World	All the Beauty and the Bloodshed (Intermission Film)	Won	
