= Our Great National Parks =

2022 documentary series

- Genre: Docuseries
- Presented by: Barack Obama
- Composer: David Schweitzer
- Country of origin: United States
- Original language: English
- No. of seasons: 1
- No. of episodes: 5

Production
- Executive producer: James Honeybourne
- Producer: Sarah Peat
- Running time: 50–54 min
- Production companies: Freeborne Media; Wild Space Productions; Higher Ground Productions

Original release
- Network: Netflix
- Release: April 13, 2022

Our Great National Parks is a five-part Netflix documentary series about some of the world's national parks and their wildlife. It is presented by former president of the United States Barack Obama and was released on April 13, 2022.

== Episodes ==
No.	Title	Original release date
1	"A World Of Wonder"	April 13, 2022
From Africa's beaches to Japan's islands to Australia's Great Barrier Reef—the natural world's untamed beauty comes into focus
2	"Chilean Patagonia"	April 13, 2022
Encompassing twenty-four unique national parks, the magnificent Chilean Patagonia is rapidly becoming one of the most protected places on the planet
3	"Tsavo, Kenya"	April 13, 2022
In Kenya's Tsavo Conservation Area, thousands of elephants roam the breathtaking, vast landscape, along with hippos, rhinos, hornbills and more
4	"Monterey Bay National Marine Sanctuary, USA"	April 13, 2022
California's vibrant coastline gets its close-up, with an emphasis on the delicate balance struck between wildlife & humanity
5	"Gunung Leuser, Indonesia"	April 13, 2022
Next stop: Gunung Leuser National Park in Indonesia, home to some of the most endangered species on earth, including the rare Sumatran tiger

== Accolades ==
Year	Award	Category	Nominee(s)	Result	Ref.
2022	Primetime Creative Arts Emmy Awards	Outstanding Narrator	Barack Obama (for "A World of Wonder")	Won	
2022	Primetime Creative Arts Emmy Awards	Outstanding Cinematography for a Nonfiction Program	Christiaan Muñoz-Salas and Ignacio Walker (for "Chilean Patagonia")	Nominated	
2022	Critics' Choice Documentary Awards	Best Limited Documentary Series	Our Great National Parks	Nominated	
2022	Critics' Choice Documentary Awards	Best Narration	Barack Obama	Nominated	
2022	Critics' Choice Documentary Awards	Best Cinematography	Cinematography Team	Won	
2022	Hollywood Music in Media Awards	Original Song/Score — Documentary Series - TV/Digital	David Schweitzer	Nominated	
