= Nuisance Bear (2026 film) =

2026 documentary film by Gabriela Osio Vanden and Jack Weisman

- Promotional release poster
- Directed by: Gabriela Osio Vanden; Jack Weisman
- Produced by: Michael Code; Will N. Miller; Teddy Leifer
- Narrated by: Mike Tunalaaq Gibbons
- Cinematography: Gabriela Osio Vanden; Jack Weisman; Michael Code; Sam Holling; Ian Kerr; Jack Gawthrop; Martin Gregus Jr
- Edited by: Andres Landau
- Music by: Cristobal Tapia de Veer
- Production companies: A24; Documist; Rise Films
- Distributed by: Mubi (worldwide); DeVuono Releasing (Canada)
- Release dates: January 24, 2026 (Sundance); November 6, 2026 (Los Angeles)
- Running time: 89 minutes
- Countries: United States; Canada
- Languages: Inuktitut; English

Nuisance Bear is a 2026 documentary film directed by Gabriela Osio Vanden and Jack Weisman. A feature-length expansion of their 2021 short film, it follows the relationship between polar bears and humans in Churchill, Manitoba and Arviat, Nunavut.

The film had its world premiere in the U.S. Documentary Competition at the 2026 Sundance Film Festival on January 24, where it won the Grand Jury Prize Documentary. It received a limited theatrical release by Mubi in Los Angeles on November 6, followed by a December 4 release in New York, Canada and the United Kingdom.

== Premise ==
The film takes place in Churchill, Manitoba and Arviat, Nunavut, a small Inuit community located about 150 miles/200km north of Churchill. It documents the migration of polar bears as they move through the town, which is populated by tourists, wildlife officers, and hunters. An Inuit narrator, Mike Tunalaaq Gibbons, recounts how Inuit relate to polar bears, their cultural significance and how sedentary life and climate change are creating challenges for bears and humans alike.

== Production ==
The film is directed by Gabriela Osio Vanden and Jack Weisman. They previously directed the 14-minute short film Nuisance Bear (2021). The short film received an honorable mention for the Best Canadian Short Film award at the 2021 Toronto International Film Festival, was a nominee for Best Short Documentary at the 10th Canadian Screen Awards, and was named to the shortlist for Best Documentary Short Film at the 95th Academy Awards.

The directors filmed in Churchill and Arviat for the feature-length expansion. The film is produced by Michael Code, Will N. Miller, and Teddy Leifer. The score is composed by Cristobal Tapia de Veer.

== Release ==
Nuisance Bear premiered as part of the U.S. Documentary Competition at the Sundance Film Festival on January 24, 2026. In May 2026, Mubi acquired worldwide distribution rights to the documentary.

Mubi released the film on November 6 in Los Angeles, which will be followed by a December 4 release in New York, Canada and the United Kingdom.

== Reception ==
=== Critical response ===
On the review aggregator website Rotten Tomatoes, the film holds a 98% approval rating, based on reviews from 41 critics, with an average rating of 7.3/10.

=== Accolades ===
Award	Date	Category	Recipient(s)	Result	Ref.
Sundance Film Festival	February 1, 2026	Grand Jury Prize – U.S. Documentary Competition	Nuisance Bear	Won	
Critics' Choice Documentary Awards	November 8, 2026	Best Science/Nature Documentary	Nuisance Bear	Won	
Critics' Choice Documentary Awards	November 8, 2026	Best First Documentary Feature	Gabriela Osio Vanden and Jack Weisman	Nominated	
Critics' Choice Documentary Awards	November 8, 2026	Best Cinematography	Gabriela Osio Vanden and Jack Weisman	Nominated	
Critics' Choice Documentary Awards	November 8, 2026	Best Score	Cristobal Tapia de Veer	Nominated	
Critics' Choice Documentary Awards	November 8, 2026	Best Narration	Mike Tunalaaq Gibbons	Nominated	
Directors Guild of Canada	November 14, 2026	DGC Allan King Award for Best Documentary Film	Gabriela Osio Vanden and Jack Weisman	Pending	
Cinema Eye Honors	January 11, 2027	Outstanding Achievement in Debut Feature Filmmaking	Gabriela Osio Vanden and Jack Weisman	Pending	
Cinema Eye Honors	January 11, 2027	Outstanding Achievement in Original Music Score	Cristobal Tapia de Veer	Pending	
Cinema Eye Honors	January 11, 2027	Outstanding Achievement in Sound Design	David Rose, Lou Solakofski and Reid Goobie	Pending	
