= Rick Perlstein =

American historian and journalist (born 1969)

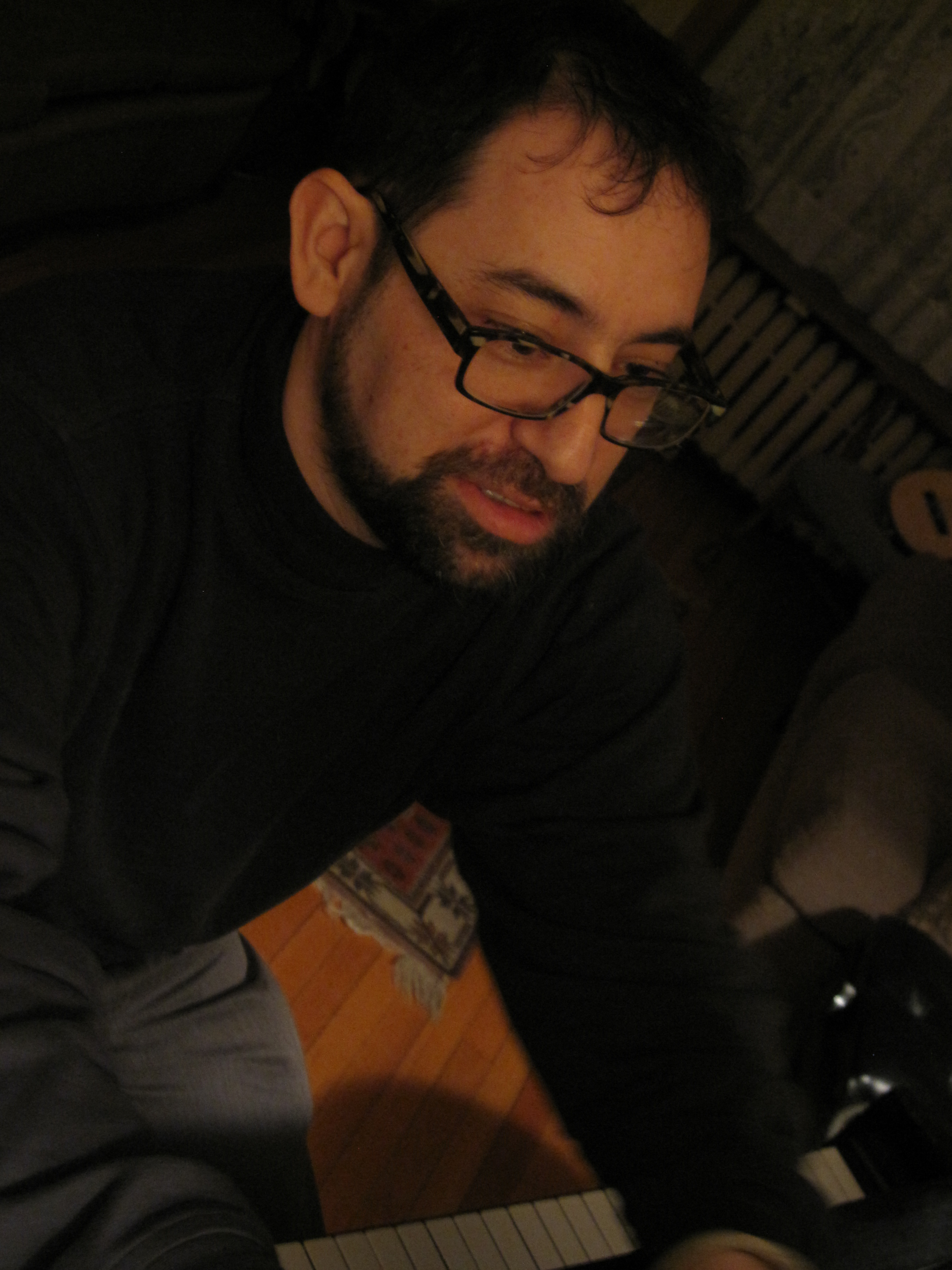
- Perlstein in Chicago, 2013
- Born: September 3, 1969 (age 57); Milwaukee, Wisconsin, U.S.
- Education: University of Chicago (BA); University of Michigan (MA)
- Occupations: Journalist; historian
- Writing career
- Period: 1994–present
- Subject: Conservatism in the United States

Rick Perlstein (born September 3, 1969) is an American historian, writer and journalist who has garnered recognition for his chronicles of the post-1960s American conservative movement. The author of five bestselling books, Perlstein received the 2001 Los Angeles Times Book Prize for History for his first book, Before the Storm: Barry Goldwater and the Unmaking of the American Consensus. Politico has dubbed him "a chronicler extraordinaire of modern conservatism."

== Early life and education ==
Perlstein was born in Milwaukee, Wisconsin to a Reform Jewish family, the second child of Jerold and Sandra (née Friedman) Perlstein. His father ran Bonded Messenger Service, a delivery company founded by his grandfather in 1955. Perlstein grew up in the Bayside and Fox Point neighborhoods of suburban Milwaukee, taking cross-country trips with his parents and siblings to national landmarks like Mount Rushmore and Yellowstone National Park.

While attending Nicolet High School, after earning his driver's license, Perlstein would head to Renaissance Books in downtown Milwaukee, and spend hours in its basement among stacks of old magazines from the 1960s. He later recounted in an interview: "I ended up getting my own archive on the 1960s culture wars. That's where it started." He also wrote in Rolling Stone: "A sixties obsessive since childhood, I misspent my teenage years prowling a ramshackle five-story used-book warehouse that somehow managed ... to stay one step ahead of Milwaukee, Wisconsin's building inspectors."

After graduating from high school, Perlstein attended the University of Chicago, earning a bachelor's degree in history in 1992. While at the University of Chicago – years Perlstein described as "delightfully noisy and dissident", and a stark contrast to the suburbia of his youth, which "felt like a jail" – he was able to engage with and catch neighborhood jam sessions.

== Career ==
After graduate study in American studies at the University of Michigan, Perlstein moved to New York in 1994, settling in the Park Slope neighborhood of Brooklyn. While in New York, Perlstein interned at Lingua Franca, a magazine about academic and intellectual life, where he would become an associate editor. Perlstein also began writing book reviews, for publications like The Nation and Slate. It was Perlstein's 1996 Lingua Franca essay "Who Owns the Sixties?" that won him public notice, by exposing the emerging chasm between older and younger historians. The essay also aroused the attention of a literary agent and soon after earned him a grant from the National Endowment for the Humanities.

In December 2023, Perlstein was hired by The American Prospect to contribute a weekly column/email newsletter on media criticism, history and the 2024 United States elections, titled The Infernal Triangle. His time at the Prospect ended in 2024.

=== Chronicle of modern American conservatism ===
External videos
- Booknotes interview with Perlstein on Before the Storm, June 3, 2001, C-SPAN
- Presentation by Perlstein on Nixonland, June 8, 2008, C-SPAN
- Q&A interview with Perlstein on The Invisible Bridge, August 14, 2014, C-SPAN
- Presentation by Perlstein on The Invisible Bridge, August 5, 2014, C-SPAN

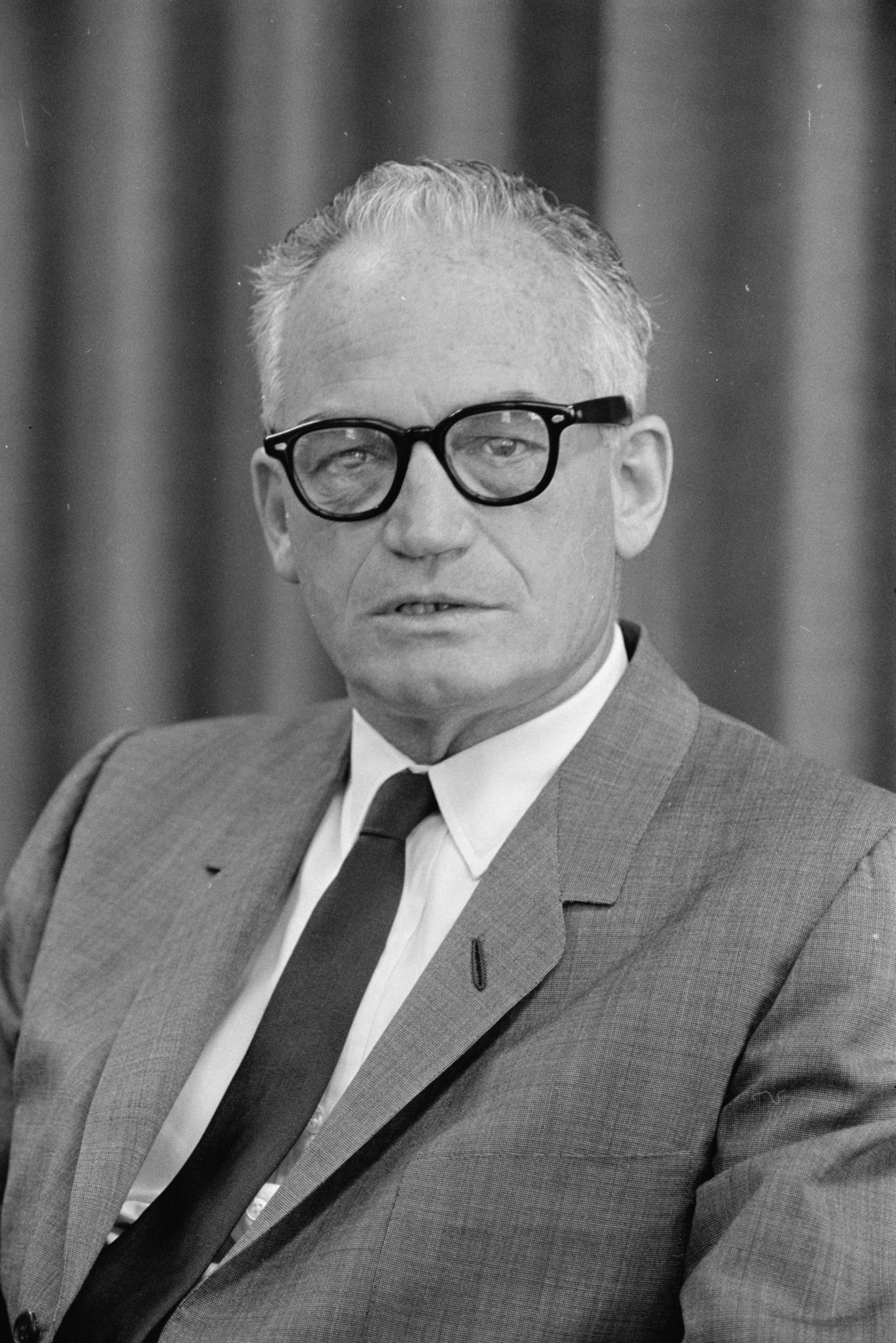
Barry Goldwater (1962)

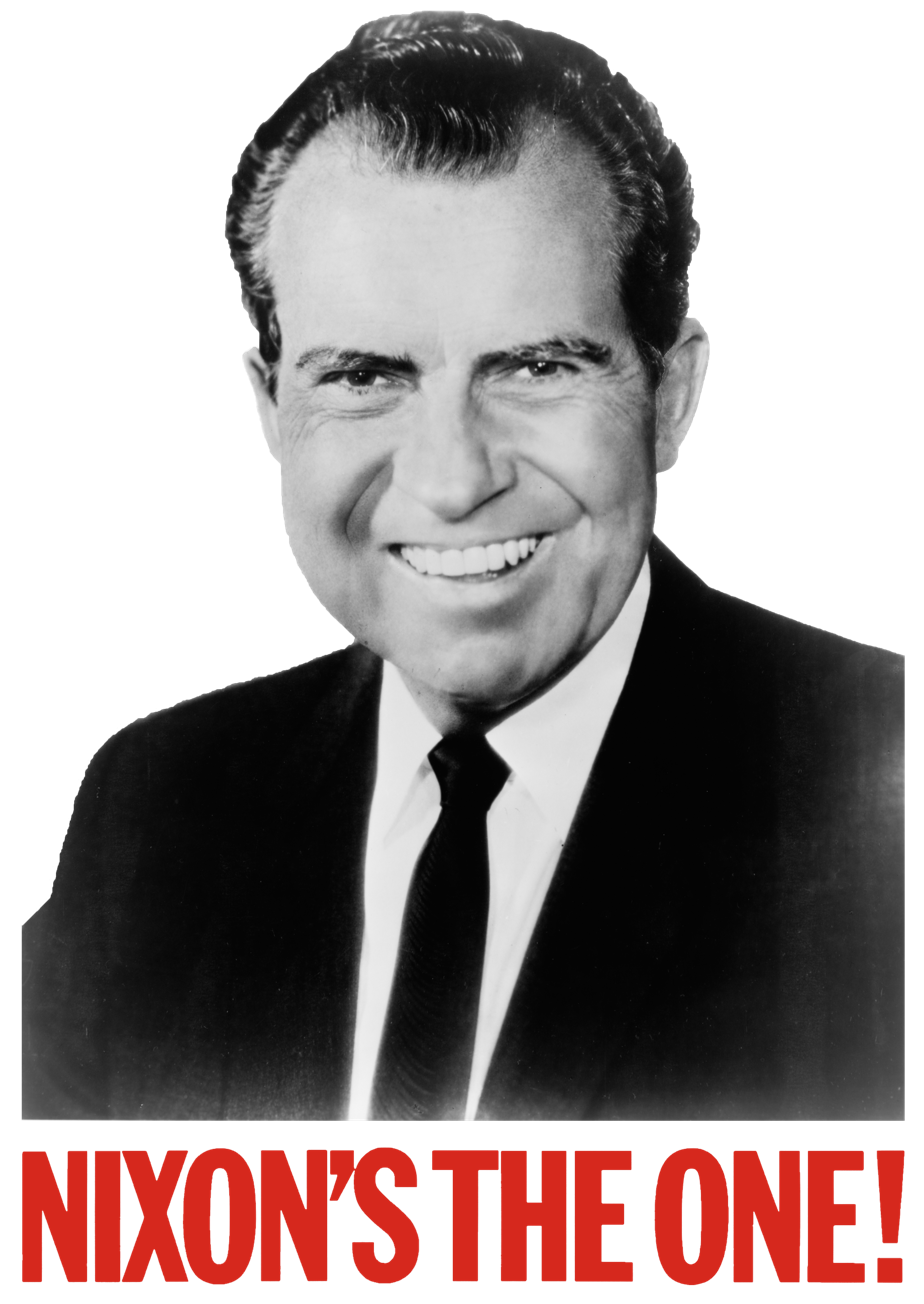
Richard Nixon Election poster (1968)

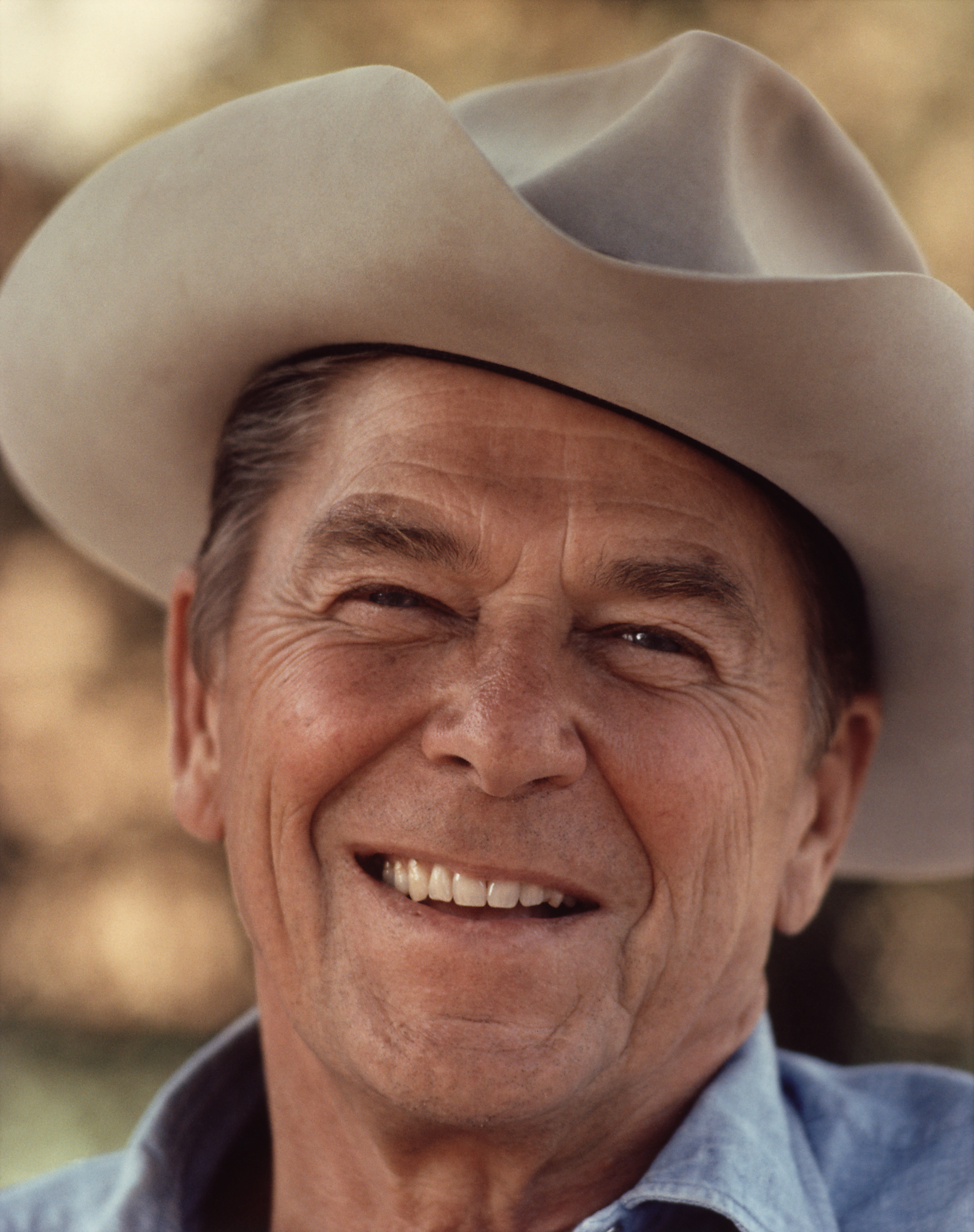
Ronald Reagan (1976)

As of 2020, Perlstein had published four notable books on the subject of modern American conservatism.

==== Before the Storm (2001) ====
In 1997, Perlstein began work on a history of the rise of Barry Goldwater, a transformative event for the conservative movement. Perlstein's book, Before the Storm: Barry Goldwater and the Unmaking of the American Consensus, was released in 2001 to widespread acclaim, including a laudatory review in The New York Times by William Kristol, editor of the conservative Weekly Standard. Kristol wrote of Before the Storm, "It's an amazing story, and Perlstein, a man of the left, does it justice." Perlstein won the 2001 Los Angeles Times Book Prize in History. Soon after, Perlstein moved from New York to Chicago. Perlstein was the national political correspondent for The Village Voice from 2003 to 2005, and contributed articles to publications that included The New York Times, The New Republic and The American Prospect.

Beginning in spring 2007 through 2009 Perlstein was a Senior Fellow at the Campaign for America's Future where he wrote for its blog The Big Con about the failures of conservative governance. A co-director at the Campaign for America's Future once noted, "Rick was unique. … I don't know when he sleeps."

==== Nixonland (2008) ====
In May 2008, Perlstein's Nixonland: The Rise of a President and the Fracturing of America was published to rave reviews. In his review, the conservative columnist George Will credited Perlstein having "a novelist's, or perhaps an anthropologist's, eye for illuminating details" and called Nixonland "compulsively readable." At the end of 2008, The New York Times included Nixonland among its notable books. In 2009, The A.V. Club included it among the best books of the decade.

==== The Invisible Bridge (2014) ====
In August 2014, Simon & Schuster published The Invisible Bridge: The Fall of Nixon and the Rise of Reagan. In his New York Times review, Frank Rich wrote that the tome was "a Rosetta stone for reading America and its politics today." The Invisible Bridge received favorable reviews from The New Yorker, Slate, and The Washington Post among others.

==== Reaganland (2020) ====
In August 2020, Perlstein published a book narrating the events of the four years up to and including Ronald Reagan's victorious presidential race against incumbent Jimmy Carter in November 1980. Reaganland: America's Right Turn, 1976–1980 is Perlstein's longest publication at almost 1,200 pages; he labeled it his final book aimed at answering the question: "How did the United States devolve from a country where Barry Goldwater was trounced in the 1964 presidential election to one where Reagan, his ideological heir, triumphed just sixteen years later?"

The book received favorable reviews from The Guardian, the Los Angeles Times, and The New Republic. Reaganland was one of the New York Times 100 Notables Books of 2020. It was also subject to a scathing critique in Commentary by Steven F. Hayward, himself an author of a two-part volume on Reagan.

==== The Infernal Triangle (forthcoming) ====
In April 2026, Perlstein announced he had completed the manuscript of his latest chronicle of American conservatism, The Infernal Triangle: An Inquiry into How America Got This Way, at the same time promising to increase output on his Substack newsletter, Rickipedia.

=== Plagiarism allegations ===
Conservative author and public relations consultant Craig Shirley has alleged that The Invisible Bridge stole distinctive words and phrasing from his 2004 book, Reagan's Revolution. Perlstein's supporters regarded the criticism as a partisan attack. Responding to numerous complaints, Times public editor Margaret Sullivan dismissed the plagiarism allegations as a "smear" and criticized the reporting for "conferr[ing] a legitimacy on the accusation it would not otherwise have had."

Responding to letters from Shirley and his attorneys, Perlstein's publisher, Simon & Schuster, stated that the claims of plagiarism "ignored the most basic principle of copyright law." Those same letters from Shirley's attorneys demanded that Simon & Schuster pay Shirley $25 million in damages, pull all copies of The Invisible Bridge and take out ads of apology in various publications. If these demands weren't met, the letters promised that a lawsuit would be filed on July 30, 2014, nearly a week before the book was to be released on August 5. On August 9, 2014, it was reported that there was no evidence a lawsuit had ever been filed. For his part, Perlstein said, "Mr. Shirley has sued me for $25 million and tried to keep people from reading my book; I've told everyone to read his book."

== Books ==
- Perlstein, Rick (2001). Before the Storm: Barry Goldwater and the Unmaking of the American Consensus. New York: Hill and Wang. ISBN 0-8090-2859-X.
- —; et al. (2005). The Stock Ticker and the Superjumbo: How the Democrats Can Once Again Become America's Dominant Political Party. Chicago: Prickly Paradigm. ISBN 0-9761475-0-5.
- — (2008). Nixonland: The Rise of a President and the Fracturing of America. New York: Scribner. ISBN 978-0-7432-4302-5.
- — (2014). The Invisible Bridge: The Fall of Nixon and the Rise of Reagan. New York: Simon & Schuster. ISBN 978-1-4767-8241-6.
- — (January–February 2017). "He's making a list: Donald Trump is as paranoid as Nixon—and even more dangerous". The New Republic. Vol. 248, no. 1–2. pp. 18–19.
- — (April 11, 2017). "I Thought I Understood the American Right. Trump Proved Me Wrong". The New York Times Magazine. pp. 37–41.
- — (2020). Reaganland: America's Right Turn, 1976–1980. New York: Simon & Schuster. ISBN 978-1-4767-9305-4.

== See also ==
- 1964, a documentary about the political, social and cultural events that marked the United States in 1964.
