= Pamela, a Love Story =

2023 documentary film by Ryan White

- Directed by: Ryan White
- Starring: Pamela Anderson
- Distributed by: Netflix
- Release date: January 31, 2023
- Running time: 112 minutes
- Country: United States
- Language: English

Pamela, a Love Story is a 2023 documentary film about the life and career of model and actress Pamela Anderson. It was directed by Ryan White, and released on Netflix on January 31, 2023.

== Synopsis ==
The documentary recounts Anderson's early life and childhood, her beginnings modelling for Playboy magazine, rise to stardom on the series Baywatch, her position as a sex symbol and sexual objectification, as well as her turbulent marriage to Mötley Crüe drummer Tommy Lee through her own narrative.

== Reception ==
Pamela, a Love Story received positive reviews. On review aggregate website Rotten Tomatoes, the film has an approval rating of 96% based on 49 reviews. The website's critics consensus reads, "Using an admittedly standard structure, Pamela, a Love Story recontextualizes its subject's very public life to thought-provoking effect." On Metacritic, the film has a weighted average score of 66 out of 100, based on 13 critics, indicating "generally favorable reviews".

=== Accolades ===
Award	Date of ceremony	Category	Result	Ref.
Creative Arts Emmy Awards	January 2024	Outstanding Documentary or Nonfiction Special	Nominated	
Creative Arts Emmy Awards	January 2024	Outstanding Music Composition for a Documentary Series or Special	Nominated	
