= A Night of Knowing Nothing =

2021 documentary film

- Release poster
- Directed by: Payal Kapadia
- Written by: Payal Kapadia; Himanshu Prajapati
- Produced by: Ranabir Das; Julien Graff; Thomas Hakim
- Narrated by: Bhumisuta Das
- Cinematography: Ranabir Das
- Edited by: Ranabir Das
- Production companies: petit chaos Another Birth
- Distributed by: Square Eyes
- Release date: 15 July 2021 (Cannes)
- Running time: 97 minutes
- Countries: France; India
- Languages: Hindi; Bengali

A Night of Knowing Nothing is a 2021 documentary film (or, some would say, a work of creative docufiction) directed by Payal Kapadia. An exploration of university student life in India, the film centres on letters written by L., a student at the Film and Television Institute of India, to her estranged boyfriend after they are separated when he is forced to quit film school and denied permission from his family to continue dating L. because she is not of the same caste.

The film premiered in the Directors' Fortnight stream at the 2021 Cannes Film Festival, where it was named the winner of the L'Œil d'or award for Best Documentary Film. It was subsequently screened at the 2021 Toronto International Film Festival, where it was one of the winners of the Amplify Voices Award.

== Release ==
The was acquired for commercial distribution by Square Eyes.

A Night of Knowing Nothing premiered in the Directors' Fortnight stream at the 2021 Cannes Film Festival. It was also screened at the 26th Busan International Film Festival and nominated for 'Busan Cinephile Award' in 'Wide Angle' section in October 2021.

== Reception ==
=== Critical response ===
On Rotten Tomatoes, the documentary holds an approval rating of 96% based on 26 reviews, with an average rating of 7.8/10.

=== Accolades ===
Year	Award	Category	Recipient	Result	Ref.
2021	Asia Pacific Screen Awards	Best Feature Film	Payal Kapadia, Thomas Hakim, Julien Graff and Ranabir Das	Nominated	
2021	Busan International Film Festival	Sonje Award	A Night of Knowing Nothing	Nominated	
2021	Cannes Film Festival	Caméra d'Or	Payal Kapadia	Nominated	
2021	Cannes Film Festival	Golden Eye	Payal Kapadia	Won	
2021	Toronto International Film Festival	Amplify Voices Award	Payal Kapadia	Won	
2022	Indian Film Festival of Melbourne	Best Documentary	A Night of Knowing Nothing	Won	
