= Blake Neely =

American composer, conductor, and orchestrator

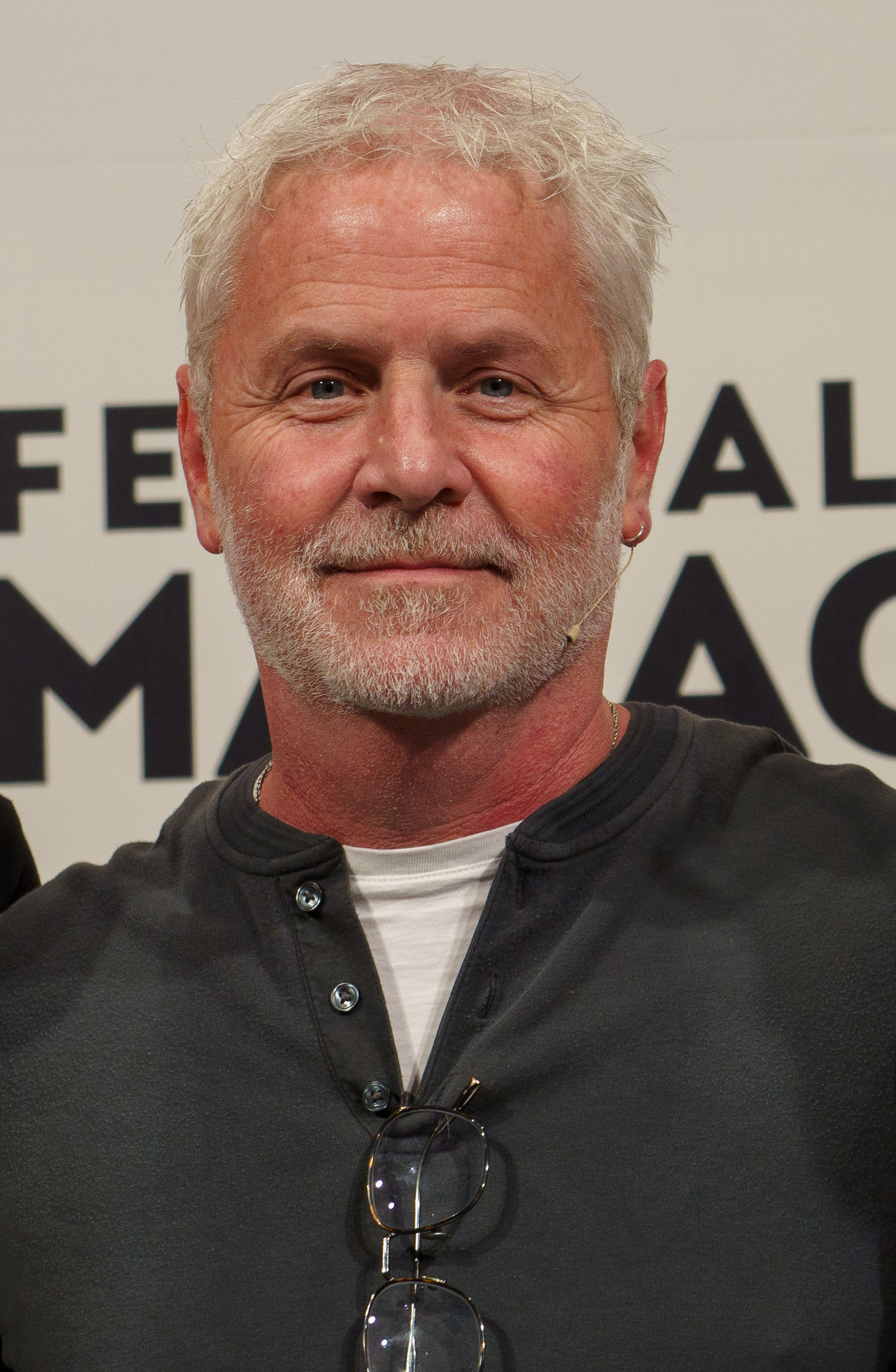
- Born: April 28, 1969 (age 57); Paris, Texas, U.S.
- Occupations: Composer; Conductor; Orchestrator
- Website: blakeneely.com

Blake Neely (born April 28, 1969) is an American composer, conductor, and orchestrator. He has been nominated for seven Emmy Awards for his work on Everwood, The Pacific, Pan Am, Pamela, a Love Story, and Good Night Oppy, and won the Emmy (2021) for The Flight Attendant.

== Early life ==
Neely was born in Paris, Texas. His father was a rancher and professor, and his mother a journalist and author. He studied linguistics at the University of Texas.

== Work ==
Neely has contributed to and been credited on a multitude of film and TV projects over the years, such as Everwood (which earned him a 2003 Emmy Award nomination for the theme), the first three Pirates of the Caribbean films, King Kong, The Last Samurai, and The Great Buck Howard. Other film projects in which he is the sole composer are Elvis and Anabelle, Starter for 10, The Wedding Date and Greyhound.

In addition, Neely has composed the music for over forty television series, including The Mentalist, You and The Flight Attendant (which earned him a 2022 Emmy Award for the theme).

He has frequently collaborated with writer/director/producer Greg Berlanti, including on Everwood, Jack & Bobby, Brothers & Sisters, Eli Stone, Dirty Sexy Money, Political Animals, Blindspot, and the Arrowverse series Arrow, The Flash, Supergirl, Legends of Tomorrow and Batwoman.

He has also been credited alongside several well-known composers such as Michael Kamen, James Newton Howard, Vangelis (for his work on Mythodea as arranger and conductor), and Hans Zimmer.

As an author, he has written over 25 instrumental method books such as the best-selling piano method Piano For Dummies.

He recorded his score for an HBO documentary on David McCullough at the Conway Studios in Hollywood on February 23, 2008.

== Discography/filmography ==
Year(s)	Title	Notes
2002	Conquest (TV series documentary)	
2003	Something's Gotta Give	Additional Music Composer
2003	Pirates of the Caribbean: The Curse of the Black Pearl	Additional Music Composer
2003	The Last Samurai	Additional Music Composer
2003	The Samurai (TV movie documentary)	
2003	It's the Cheese (Short)	
2003	The True Story of Seabiscuit (TV movie documentary)	
2003–2004	Wild West Tech (TV series documentary) (10 episodes)	
2004	King Arthur	Additional Music Composer
2004	Catwoman	Additional Music Composer
2004	Oedipus (Short)	
2004	Kat Plus One (TV movie)	
2004	Frog-g-g!	
2004	Brother, Can You Spare a Job? (Short)	
2004	First Daughter	
2004–2005	Jack & Bobby (TV series) (22 episodes)	
2005	Revelations (TV mini-series) (2 episodes)	Additional Music Composer
2005	Into the West (TV mini-series)	Additional Music Composer
2005	The Island	Additional Music Composer
2005	King Kong	Additional Music Composer
2005	The Wedding Date	
2005	Get Froggged!: Behind the Scenes of Frog-g-g! (Documentary short)	
2005	A Date with Debra (Video documentary short)	
2005	Magnificent Desolation: Walking on the Moon 3D (Documentary short)	
2005	Related (TV series) (5 episodes)	
2002–2006	Everwood (TV series) (89 episodes)	
2004–2006	Dr. Vegas (TV series) (6 episodes)	
2006	RV	Additional Music Composer
2006	The Da Vinci Code	Additional Music Composer
2006	Starter for 10	
2006–2007	What About Brian (TV series) (8 episodes)	
2007	Pushing Daisies (TV series) (composer, 1 episode)	
2007	Elvis and Anabelle	
2007	Brothers & Sisters: A Family Matter (TV movie)	
2007	Traveler (TV series) (8 episodes)	
2007	Brothers & Sisters: Family Album (TV movie)	
2007	Masters of the Heist (Video documentary short)	
2007–2008	Notes from the Underbelly (TV series) (16 episodes)	
2008	The Great Buck Howard	
2008	David McCullough: Painting with Words (TV movie documentary)	
2008	Recruited (Short)	
2008	Surfer, Dude	
2008–2009	Eli Stone (TV series) (26 episodes)	
2008–2015	The Mentalist (TV series) (151 episodes)	
2009–2010	Eastwick (TV series) (11 episodes)	
2010	Think Tank (Short)	
2010	The Pacific (TV mini-series) (10 episodes)	
2010	Life as We Know it	
2006–2011	Brothers & Sisters	
2010–2011	No Ordinary Family (TV series) (15 episodes)	
2011	An Article of Hope (Documentary)	
2011	Royal Reunion (Short)	
2011	Love, Wedding, Marriage	
2011	Mister Handsome (Short)	
2011–2012	Pan Am (TV series) (10 episodes)	
2012	Political Animals (TV mini-series) (1 episode)	
2012–2013	Wedding Band (TV series) (3 episodes)	
2012–2020	Arrow (TV series)	
2013	Golden Boy (TV series) (13 episodes)	
2013	Arrow: Year One (TV movie)	
2013	The Sixties (TV series documentary) (1 episode)	
2013	The Assassination of President Kennedy (TV movie documentary)	
2013–2014	The Mindy Project (TV series) (6 episodes)	
2014–2023	The Flash (TV series)	
2014	Resurrection (TV series) (6 episodes)	
2015–2016	Blindspot (TV series)	
2015–2021	Supergirl (TV series)	
2016–2022	Legends of Tomorrow (TV series)	
2017–2023	Riverdale (TV series)	
2017	The Keepers (Documentary web series)	
2017–2018	Kevin (Probably) Saves the World (TV series)	
2018	Love, Simon	
2018–2026	All American (TV series)	
2018–2025	You (TV series)	
2019	Emergence (TV series)	
2019–2022	Batwoman (TV series)	
2020	Greyhound	
2020–2022	The Flight Attendant (TV series)	
2022	Keep Breathing (TV series)	
2022	Good Night Oppy (Documentary)	
2022–2024	All American: Homecoming (TV series)	
2024	Masters of the Air (TV series)	
2024	The Girls on the Bus (TV series)	
2024	Dead Boy Detectives (TV series)	
2025	Come See Me in the Good Light (Documentary feature)	
2025	Jaws @ 50: The Definitive Inside Story (Documentary feature)	
