= Nuisance Bear (2021 film) =

2021 Canadian film

- Film poster
- Directed by: Jack Weisman; Gabriela Osio Vanden
- Produced by: Jack Weisman
- Cinematography: Sam Holling; Gabriela Osio Vanden; Jack Weisman
- Edited by: Andres Landau; Will Miller; Jack Weisman
- Production company: Documist
- Distributed by: The New Yorker
- Release date: September 11, 2021 (TIFF)
- Running time: 14 minutes
- Country: Canada
- Language: No dialogue

Nuisance Bear is a 2021 Canadian short documentary film, directed by Jack Weisman and Gabriela Osio Vanden.

A full-length version of the film, Nuisance Bear, premiered at the 2026 Sundance Film Festival.

== Summary ==
The film is a portrait of the polar bears in and around the town of Churchill, Manitoba.

== Awards ==
The film had its world premiere at the 2021 Toronto International Film Festival, where it received an honorable mention from the jury for the Best Canadian Short Film award. The film subsequently screened at True/False Film Festival 2022 and SXSW Film Festival 2022.

Nuisance Bear received a Canadian Screen Award nomination for Best Short Documentary at the 10th Canadian Screen Awards in 2022.
