= Soundwalk Collective =

Experimental sound art collective

Soundwalk Collective is an international experimental sound art collective founded in 2001 by Stephan Crasneanscki, who was joined by Simone Merli in 2008. The group is based in Berlin and New York. They have engaged in collaborations with other musicians such as the American singer Patti Smith on the Perfect Vision Trilogy.

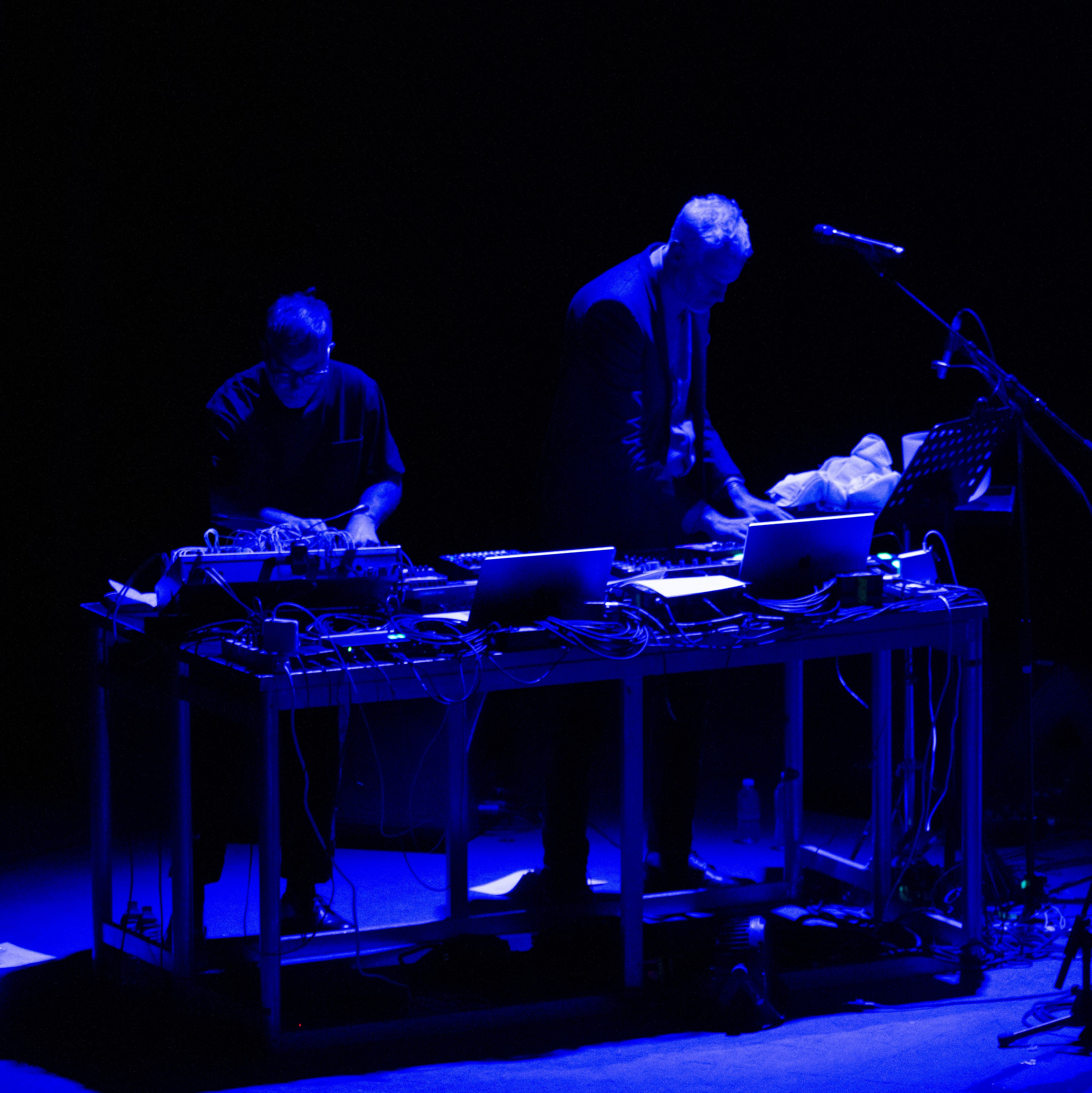
Soundwalk Collective on stage in Mexico City.

== Work ==
=== Composition ===
Soundwalk Collective’s musical work emerges from a multidisciplinary approach rooted primarily in psychogeography and in the exploration of recording and synthesis. Elements of observation of nature, non-linear narrative, ethnography, and anthropology are intertwined in their work.

In order to develop this approach, they have travelled across the world, from cities to remote locations, for extended periods of investigation and fieldwork to source the materials that form the core of their work.

=== Notable collaborations ===
Since their foundation, Soundwalk Collective have collaborated with numerous artists, including singer, songwriter and poet Patti Smith, jazz musician Mulatu Astatke, photographer Nan Goldin, film director Jean-Luc Godard, composer Philip Glass, film director Abel Ferrara, and singer and actor Charlotte Gainsbourg.

Other notable collaborators include musician and producer Brian Eno, musician and performer FKA twigs, actor Willem Dafoe, vocalist and composer Lyra Pramuk, electronic music producer Atom TM, DJ and music producer Nina Kraviz, filmmaker Kaan Müjdeci, filmmaker and photographer Wim Wenders, filmmaker Werner Herzog, and filmmaker and musician Jim Jarmusch.

They have also written original scores for contemporary dance choreographer Sasha Waltz and collaborated with Italian fashion brand Bottega Veneta on a special performance in 2025 and on the score for the brand's Fall–Winter 2026 fashion show.

Their collaboration with American sound artist Bernie Krause led to the creation of a sound piece for Fondation Cartier in Paris in 2025.

=== Exhibitions and installations ===
Soundwalk Collective have performed and exhibited at Opéra de Lyon, CTM Festival, KW Institute of Contemporary Art, Barbican Centre, Berghain, Centre Georges Pompidou, Florence Gould Hall, Mobile Art by Zaha Hadid in Hong Kong, Tokyo, New York; MUDAM, MuCEM, Museo Madre, New Museum, The Foundation Carmingac, Louvre Abu Dhabi, Palazzo Reale in Milan, La Triennale, Radialsystem V, documenta14 in Athens and Kassel, Funkhaus in Berlin, Manifesta12 in Palermo.

The collective also collaborated with photographer Nan Goldin on the touring exhibition This Will Not End Well, composing sound for several of Goldin's video installations. The exhibition was presented at Moderna Museet in Stockholm, the Stedelijk Museum Amsterdam, the Neue Nationalgalerie in Berlin, Pirelli HangarBicocca in Milan, and the Grand Palais in Paris. In 2025, a live performance of the score for Goldin's Memory Lost was presented at the Théâtre Antique during Rencontres d'Arles.

Selection of solo exhibitions:

- Rubin Museum of Art in New York
- Kurimanzutto in New York
- The Bardo National Museum in Tunis
- The Beit Museum in Beirut
- Belém Cultural Center in Lisbon
- MAMM Medellín Museum of Modern Art
- Piknic in Seoul
- Museum of Contemporary Art Tokyo
- Times Square in New York, which hosted the Midnight Moment installation Jungle-ized in 2016.

=== Venice Biennale ===
In 2022, Soundwalk Collective composed the sound installation for A Roof for Silence, an artwork by architect Hala Wardé presented at the Lebanese Pavilion during the 17th International Architecture Exhibition – La Biennale di Venezia in 2022.

Soundwalk Collective composed the soundtrack for the documentary All the Beauty and the Bloodshed, directed by Laura Poitras and centered on the life and work of Nan Goldin; the film was awarded the Golden Lion at the Venice Film Festival in 2022.

In 2026, Soundwalk Collective participated in the Holy See Pavilion at the 61st Venice Biennale, The Ear Is the Eye of the Soul, curated by Hans Ulrich Obrist and Ben Vickers, at the Giardino Mistico dei Carmelitani Scalzi (Mystical Garden) in Venice. The collective shaped the exhibition’s sound environment and site-specific audio installations throughout the garden pavilion.

=== Correspondences ===
Correspondences is an ongoing collaborative project between Soundwalk Collective and musician and writer Patti Smith. The project brings together sound and spoken word and has been presented in exhibition and installation formats at international cultural institutions, including the Museum of Contemporary Art Tokyo, Onassis Stegi in Athens, Neuer Berliner Kunstverein (n.b.k.) in Berlin, LUMA Arles, Kurimanzutto in New York, Mendes Wood DM in São Paulo, the Medellín Museum of Modern Art (MAMM), and MUDE – Museu do Design e da Moda in Lisbon.

=== Invisible Landscape ===
Invisible Landscape is a sound installation project by Soundwalk Collective that forms part of the collective's ongoing work with site- and context-specific sound. The project has been presented in exhibition contexts, including at Biennale Son in Switzerland, and incorporates recorded voices by invited artists as part of its installation-based approach to sound.

== Discography ==
Albums

- Nyc: Lower East Side (2004)
- Kill The Ego (2008)
- La Brulure (2009)
- Medea (2013)
- Berghain: Surface Vibration & Resonances (2013)
- Last Beat (2014)
- Sons of the Wind (2014)
- Killer Road (2016)
- Khandroma (2016)
- Before Music There Is Blood (2017)
- Transmissions (2017)
- Kreatur (2017)
- Death Must Die (2018)
- What We Leave Behind – Jean-Luc Godard Archives (2018)
- What We Leave Behind – The Remixes (2018)
- What We Leave Behind – Jean-Luc Godard Archives – Artist Edition (2019)
- The Peyote Dance (2019)
- Mummer Love (2019)
- Oscillation (2019)
- The women's march (2019)
- The Time of the Night – Fondation Carmignac (2020)
- Peradam (2020)
- A Roof For Silence (2021)
- Memory lost / sirens (2021)
- Lovotic (2022)
- The Perfect Vision (2022)
- All The Beauty And The Bloodshed (2023)
- It's All Breaking Apart (2024)
- Correspondences vol. 1 (2024)
- Correspondences vol. 2 (2025)
