= 44th Telluride Film Festival =

2017 film festival

- Location: Telluride, Colorado, United States
- Founded: 1974
- Awards: Telluride Film Festival Silver Medallion: Edward Lachman; Christian Bale
- Hosted by: National Film Preserve Ltd.
- Festival date: September 1–4, 2017
- Website: Telluride Film Festival

Telluride Film Festival
- 45th 43rd

The 44th Telluride Film Festival was held from September 1 to 4, 2017, in Telluride, Colorado.

American-British filmmaker Joshua Oppenheimer was chosen as the edition's guest director, and selected six classic films for a parallel section.

The Telluride Film Festival Silver Medallion was presented to American cinematographer Edward Lachman and British actor Christian Bale. The Special Medallion was awarded to Katriel Schory, head of the Israeli Film Fund.

== Official selections ==
The official line-up was announced, as usual, on the day before the festival's official opening, on August 31, 2017.

=== Main program ===
The following films were selected to be screened:

English Title	Original Title	Director(s)	Production Country
Arthur Miller: Writer		Rebecca Miller	United States
The Baker's Wife (1938)	La femme du boulanger	Marcel Pagnol	France
Battle of the Sexes		Jonathan Dayton and Valerie Faris	United States
Closeness	Теснота	Kantemir Balagov	Russia
The Cotton Club Encore (1984)		Francis Ford Coppola	United States
Darkest Hour		Joe Wright	United Kingdom
Downsizing		Alexander Payne	United States
Eating Animals		Christopher Dillon Quinn	United States
Faces Places	Visages Villages	Agnès Varda and JR	France
A Fantastic Woman	Una mujer fantástica	Sebastián Lelio	Chile, United States, Germany, Spain
Film Stars Don't Die in Liverpool		Paul McGuigan	United Kingdom
First Reformed		Paul Schrader	United States
First They Killed My Father	មុនដំបូងខ្មែរក្រហមសម្លាប់ប៉ារបស់ខ្ញុំ	Angelina Jolie	United States, Cambodia
Foxtrot	פוֹקְסטְרוֹט	Samuel Maoz	Israel
Heroin(e) (short)		Elaine McMillion Sheldon	United States
Hostages		Rezo Gigineishvili	Georgia, Russia, Poland
Hostiles		Scott Cooper	United States
Human Flow		Ai Weiwei	United States, Germany
The Insult	قضية رقم ٢٣	Ziad Doueiri	France, Lebanon
Kean, or Disorder and Genius	Kean, ou Désordre et génie	Aleksandr Volkoff	France
Lady Bird		Greta Gerwig	United States
Land of the Free		Camilla Magid	Denmark, Finland
Lean on Pete		Andrew Haigh	United Kingdom, United States
Long Shot		Jacob LaMendola	United States
Love, Cecil		Lisa Immordino Vreeland	United States
Loveless	Нелюбовь	Andrey Zvyagintsev	Russia, France, Belgium, Germany
Loving Vincent		DK Welchman and Hugh Welchman	United Kingdom, Poland
A Man of Integrity	لِرد	Mohammad Rasoulof	Iran
The Other Side of Hope	Toivon tuolla puolen	Aki Kaurismäki	Finland
The Rider		Chloé Zhao	United States
The Shape of Water		Guillermo del Toro	United States
Such Is Life	Takový je život	Carl Junghans	Czechoslovakia
The Venerable W.	Le vénérable W.	Barbet Schroeder	France, Switzerland
The Vietnam War (series)		Ken Burns and Lynn Novick	United States
Wonderstruck		Todd Haynes	United States
Wormwood		Errol Morris	United States

=== Guest Director's Selections ===
The following films were selected and presented by the year's guest director, Joshua Oppenheimer:

English Title	Original Title	Director(s)	Production Country
Even Dwarfs Started Small (1970)	Auch Zwerge haben klein angefangen	Werner Herzog	West Germany
Hello Cinema (1955)	سلام سینما	Mohsen Makhmalbaf	Iran
Hotel of the Stars (1981)		Jon Bang Carlsen	Denmark
The Night of the Hunter (1955)		Charles Laughton	United States
Titicut Follies (1967)		Frederick Wiseman	United States
The Umbrellas of Cherbourg (1964)	Les Parapluies de Cherbourg	Jacques Demy	France, West Germany

=== Backlot ===
The selection included behind-the-scene movies and portraits of artists, musicians, and filmmakers. The following films were selected to be screened:

English Title	Original Title	Director(s)	Production Country
Cinema Through the Eye of Magnum	Le cinéma dans l'oeil de Magnum	Sophie Bassaler	France
Edge of Alchemy		Stacey Steers	United States
Filmworker		Tony Zierra	United States
Hitler's Hollywood	Hitlers Hollywood	Rüdiger Suchsland	Germany
Jamaica Man		Michael Weatherly	United States
Portrait of Valeska Gert (1977)	Nur zum Spaß - nur zum Spiel	Volker Schlöndorff	West Germany
Slim Gaillard's Civilisation		Anthony Wall	United Kingdom
That Summer		Göran Hugo Olsson	Sweden, United States, Denmark

=== Filmmakers of Tomorrow ===
==== Student Prints ====
The selection was curated and introduced by Gregory Nava, selecting the best student-produced work around the world. The following films were selected to be screened:

Title	Director(s)	Universitie(s)
Homeland	Sam Peeters	Royal Institute of Theatre, Cinema and Sound
It's Just a Gun	Brian Robau	Chapman University
Leaving Syria: Long Live the Youth	Yara Atz	Geneva University of Art and Design
Tomorrow, and Tomorrow, and Tomorrow	Sunday Emerson Gullifer	Victorian College of the Arts
Who's Who in Mycology	Marie Dvorakova	New York University

==== Calling Cards ====
The selection was curated by Barry Jenkins, selecting new works from promising filmmakers. The following films were selected to be screened:

Title	Director(s)	Production Country
Anderson	Rodrigo Meireles	Brazil
The Ceiling	Teppo Airaksinen	Finland
Debris	Julio O. Ramos	Peru
Durango	Matt Sukkar	United States
Fluffy	Lee Filipovski	Serbia, Canada
Little Hands	Rémi Allier	Belgium

==== Great Expectations ====
The selection was also curated by Barry Jenkins. The following films were selected to be screened:

Title	Director(s)	Production Country
The Best Fireworks Ever	Aleksandra Terpińska	Poland
Delphi	Søren Peter Langkjær Bojsen	Denmark
Le film de l'ete	Emmanuel Marre	France, Belgium
A Gentle Night	Yang Qiu	China
Skywards	Eva Weber	United Kingdom

== Official Awards ==
- Silver Medallion:
  - Edward Lachman
  - Christian Bale
- Special Medallion: Katriel Schory
