= 49th Telluride Film Festival =

Telluride Film Festival on its 49th edition

- Location: Telluride, Colorado, United States
- Founded: 1974
- Awards: Telluride Film Festival Silver Medallion: Sarah Polley; Cate Blanchett; Mark Cousins
- Artistic director: Julie Huntsinger
- Festival date: September 2–5, 2022
- Website: telluridefilmfestival.org
- 50th 48th

The 49th Telluride Film Festival took place from September 2 to 5, 2022, in Telluride, Colorado.

Russian dissident filmmakers Kantemir Balagov and Kira Kovalenko were chosen as the edition's guest director, and selected six classic films for a parallel section.

The Telluride Film Festival Silver Medallion was presented to American filmmaker Sarah Polley, Australian actress Cate Blanchett, and British filmmaker Mark Cousins.

In July 2022 it was announced that author, artist, graphic novelist and publisher Leanne Shapton would design the annual poster for the 49th edition.

== Official selection ==
The official line-up was announced, as usual, on the day before the festival's official opening.

=== Main Program ===
The following films were selected to be screened:

English Title	Original Title	Director(s)	Production Country
Armageddon Time		James Gray	United States
Bardo, False Chronicle of a Handful of Truths	Bardo, falsa crónica de unas cuantas verdades	Alejandro González Iñárritu	Mexico
Bobi Wine: The People's President		Moses Bwayo and Christopher Sharp	United Kingdom, Uganda, United States
Bones and All		Luca Guadagnino	United States, Italy
Broker	브로커	Hirokazu Kore-eda	South Korea
A Compassionate Spy		Steve James	United States
The Corridors of Power		Dror Moreh	United States
Close		Lukas Dhont	Belgium, Netherlands, France
The End of the World		Matt Tyrnauer	United States
Empire of Light		Sam Mendes	United Kingdom, United States
The Future Tense		Christine Molloy and Joe Lawlor	Ireland
Good Night Oppy		Ryan White	United States
Godland	Volaða land	Hlynur Pálmason	Denmark, Iceland, France, Sweden
Holy Spider	عنکبوت مقدس	Ali Abbasi	Denmark, Germany, Sweden, France
Icarus: The Aftermath		Bryan Fogel	United States
If These Walls Could Sing		Mary McCartney	United Kingdom
Lady Chatterley's Lover		Laure de Clermont-Tonnerre	United Kingdom, United States
Last Flight Home		Ondi Timoner	United States
Living		Oliver Hermanus	United Kingdom
The March on Rome		Mark Cousins	Italy
Merkel		Eva Weber	United Kingdom
My Name is Alfred Hitchcock		Mark Cousins	United Kingdom
One Fine Morning	Un beau matin	Mia Hansen-Løve	France
Retrograde		Matthew Heineman	United States
Sr.		Chris Smith	United States
Squaring the Circle		Anton Corbijn	United Kingdom
Tár		Todd Field	United States, Germany
Tori and Lokita	Tori et Lokita	Jean-Pierre Dardenne and Luc Dardenne	Belgium, France
Wildcat		Melissa Lesh and Trevor Beck Frost	United States
Women Talking		Sarah Polley	United States
The Wonder		Sebastián Lelio	United States, United Kingdom, Ireland
Episodic Form and Short Form
Anastasia		Sarah McCarthy	United Kingdom, Russia
Angola Do You Hear Us? Voices from a Plantation Prison		Cinque Northern	United States
The Best Chef in the World		Ben Proudfoot	United States
Guerrilla Habeas		Emma Wall and Betsy Hershey	United States
Le pupille		Alice Rohrwacher	Italy, United States
Marianne		Lara Porzak and Rebecca Ressler	United States
Russia 1985–1999: TraumaZone (series)		Adam Curtis	United Kingdom
The U.S. and the Holocaust (episode 1)		Ken Burns, Lynn Novick and Sarah Botstein	United States
Sneak Previews
Aftersun		Charlotte Wells	United Kingdom, United States
All the Beauty and the Bloodshed		Laura Poitras	United States

=== Guest Director's Selections ===
The following films were selected to be screened by this year guest directors, Kantemir Balagov and Kira Kovalenko:

English Title	Original Title	Director(s)	Production Country
Elegy of a Voyage (2001)	Элегия дороги	Aleksandr Sokurov	France, Russia, Netherlands
Getting to Know the Big, Wide, World (1978)	Познавая белый свет	Kira Muratova	Soviet Union
L'Atalante (1934)		Jean Vigo	France
Oasis (2002)	오아시스	Lee Chang-dong	South Korea
Where Is the Friend's House? (1987)	خانه دوست کجاست	Abbas Kiarostami	Iran
The Wonders (2014)	Le meraviglie	Alice Rohrwacher	Italy, Switzerland, Germany

=== Backlot ===
The following films were selected to be screened:

Film	Director(s)	Production Country
Frames of Love and War	Ran Tal	Israel, United States, United Kingdom
Desperate Souls, Dark City and the Legend of Midnight Cowboy	Nancy Buirski	United States
Fragments of Paradise	KD Davison	United States
High Noon on the Waterfront	David Roberts and Billy Shebar	United States
The Last Rider	Alex Holmes	United Kingdom
The Méliès Mystery	Serge Bromberg and Eric Lange	France
Miúcha, the Voice of Bossa Nova	Daniel Zarvos and Liliane Mutti	Brazil, France
The Padilla Affair	Pavel Giroud	Spain, Cuba
Salvatore: Shoemaker of Dreams	Luca Guadagnino	Italy
See You Friday, Robinson	Mitra Farahani	France

=== Special Screenings ===
The following films were selected to be screened:

Film	Director(s)	Production Country
Orlando (1992)	Sally Potter	United Kingdom, Russia, Italy, France, Netherlands
Crouching Tiger, Hidden Dragon (2000)	Ang Lee	United States, Taiwan, Hong Kong, China
The Return of Tanya Tucker: Featuring Brandi Carlile	Kathlyn Horan	United States
The Fire Within: A Requiem for Katia and Maurice Krafft	Werner Herzog	United Kingdom, France, Switzerland, United States
Theater of Thought	Werner Herzog	United States
Werner Herzog: Radical Dreamer	Thomas von Steinaecker	Germany, United Kingdom
Wild Life	Elizabeth Chai Vasarhelyi and Jimmy Chin	United States

=== Filmmakers of Tomorrow Official Selection ===
==== Student Prints ====
Curated and introduced by Gregory Nava. The following films were selected to be screened:

Film	Director(s)	Production Country/Universitie(s)
Favorite Daughter	Dana Reilly	United States (University of Texas at Austin)
Berry Pickers	Agnes Skonare Karlsson	Sweden, United States (Columbia University)
Solo	Anat Eisenberg	Israel (Tel Aviv University)
The Rotting Of Casey Culpepper	Daniel Slottje	United States (Columbia University)
The Midwife	Anne-Sophie Bailly	France (La Fémis)

==== Calling Cards ====
Curated and introduced by Barry Jenkins. The following films were selected to be screened:

Film	Director(s)	Production countrie(s)
Nuture	Sasha Argirov	Canada
Neighbour Abdi	Douwe Dijkstra	The Netherlands
Uogus (Cherries)	Vytautas Katkus	Lithuania
Fire at the Lake	Pierre Menahem	France
Un Petite Homme (A Tiny Man)	Aude David and Mikaël Gaudin	France
Le Comoran	Lubna Playoust	France

===== Calling Cards — Redband =====
Curated and introduced by Barry Jenkins. The following films were selected to be screened:

Film	Director(s)	Production countrie(s)
Starfuckers	Antonio Marziale	United States
Zoon	Jonatan Schwenk	Germany
Luciene in a World Without Solitude	Geordy Couturiau	France
Abyss	Jeppe Lange	Denmark
Ambasciatori	Francesco Romano	Italy
Bestia	Hugo Covarrubias	Chile

== Official Awards ==
- Silver Medallion:
  - Cate Blanchett
  - Sarah Polley
  - Mark Cousins
