= 42nd Telluride Film Festival =

2015 film festival

- Location: Telluride, Colorado, United States
- Founded: 1974
- Awards: Telluride Film Festival Silver Medallion: Rooney Mara; Danny Boyle; Adam Curtis
- Hosted by: National Film Preserve Ltd.
- Festival date: September 4–7, 2015
- Website: Telluride Film Festival

Telluride Film Festival
- 43rd 41st

The 42nd Telluride Film Festival took place from September 4 to 7, 2015, in Telluride, Colorado.

American writer Rachel Kushner was chosen as the edition's guest director, and selected six classic films for a parallel section.

The Telluride Film Festival Silver Medallion was presented to American actress Rooney Mara, and British filmmakers Danny Boyle and Adam Curtis. American producing company Participant Media received the Special Medallion award.

== Official selections ==
The official line-up was announced, as usual, on the day before the festival's official opening, on September 3, 2015.

=== Main Program ===
The following films were selected to be screened:

English Title	Original Title	Director(s)	Production Country
45 Years		Andrew Haigh	United Kingdom
Amazing Grace		Alan Elliott and Sydney Pollack	United States
Anomalisa		Charlie Kaufman and Duke Johnson	United States
Beasts of No Nation		Cary Joji Fukunaga	United States
Bitter Lake		Adam Curtis	United Kingdom
Black Mass		Scott Cooper	United States
Carol		Todd Haynes	United States
He Named Me Malala		Davis Guggenheim	United States, United Arab Emirates
Heart of a Dog		Laurie Anderson	United States
Hitchcock/Truffaut		Kent Jones	France, United States
Ixcanul		Jayro Bustamante	Guatemala
Marguerite		Xavier Giannoli	France
Mom and Me		Ken Wardrop	Ireland
Only the Dead		Michael Ware and Bill Guttentag	Australia
Rams	Hrútar	Grímur Hákonarson	Iceland, Denmark, Norway, Poland
Room		Lenny Abrahamson	Ireland, Canada, United Kingdom, United States
Siti		Eddie Cahyono	Indonesia
Son of Saul	Saul fia	László Nemes	Hungary
Spotlight		Tom McCarthy	United States
Steve Jobs		Danny Boyle	United Kingdom, United States
Suffragette		Sarah Gavron	United Kingdom, France, United States
Taj Mahal		Nicolas Saada	France, Belgium
Taxi	تاکسی	Jafar Panahi	Iran
Tikkun	תיקון	Avishai Sivan	Israel
Time to Choose		Charles Ferguson	United States
Viva		Paddy Breathnach	Ireland
Winter on Fire: Ukraine's Fight for Freedom	Зима у вогні: Боротьба України за свободу	Evgeny Afineevsky	Ukraine, United States, United Kingdom

=== Guest Director's Selections ===
The films were selected and presented by the year's guest director, Rachel Kushner.

English Title	Original Title	Director(s)	Production Country
Cocksucker Blues (1972)		Robert Frank	United States
A Day in the Country (1946)	Partie de campagne	Jean Renoir	France
The Mattei Affair (1972)	Il Caso Mattei	Francesco Rosi	Italy
The Mother and the Whore (1973)	La Maman Et La Putain	Jean Eustache	France
My Little Loves (1974)	Mes Petites Amoureuses	Jean Eustache	France
Uncle Yanco (1967) (short)	Oncle Yanco	Agnès Varda	France
Wake in Fright (1971)		Ted Kotcheff	Australia

=== Filmmakers of Tomorrow ===
==== Student Prints ====
The selection was curated and introduced by Gregory Nava. It selected the best student-produced work around the world.

Title	Director(s)	Universitie(s)
El adiós	Clara Roquet	Columbia University
Day One	Henry Hughes	American Film Institute
The Mink Catcher	Samantha Buck	Columbia University
My Aleppo	Melissa Langer	Stanford University
Patriot	Eva Riley	National Film and Television School
Pidge	Renee Zhan	Harvard University
Two Sisters	Keola Racela	Columbia University

==== Calling Cards ====
The selection was curated by Barry Jenkins. It selected new works from promising filmmakers.

Title	Director(s)	Production Country
The Beast	Daina O. Pusić	Croatia
Chaud Lapin	Alexis Magaud, Soline Béjuy, Maël Berreur, Géraldine Gaston and Flora Andrivon	France
Coach	Ben Adler	France
The Face of Ukraine: Casting Oksana Baiul	Kitty Green	Australia
The Lights	Juan Renau and Manuel Abramovich	Argentina
Manoman	Simon Cartright	United Kingdom
Over	Jörn Threlfall	United Kingdom
Share	Pippa Bianco	United States
Teeth	Daniel Gray and Tom Brown	United Kingdom

==== Great Expectations ====
The selection was curated by Barry Jenkins.

Title	Director(s)	Production Country
Everything Will Be Okay	Patrick Vollrath	Germany, Austria
Hot Nasty Teen	Jens Assur	Sweden
Ramona	Andrei Cretulescu	Romania

=== Backlot ===
The selection included behind-the-scene movies and portraits of artists, musicians, and filmmakers.

Title	Director(s)	Production Country
The Century of the Self	Adam Curtis	United Kingdom
Cinema: A Public Affair	Tatiana Brandrup	Russia
In the Shadow of the Great Oaks	Georges Mourier	France
Ingrid Bergman: In Her Own Words	Stig Björkman	Sweden
Peggy Guggenheim: Art Addict	Lisa Immordino Vreeland	United States
Sembene!	Samba Gadjigo, Jason Silverman	United States, Senegal
Tyrus	Pamela Tom	United States
