= 47th Telluride Film Festival =

2020 canceled film festival

- Location: Telluride, Colorado, United States
- Founded: 1974
- Awards: Telluride Film Festival Silver Medallion: Chloé Zhao; Anthony Hopkins; Kate Winslet
- Hosted by: National Film Preserve Ltd.
- Festival date: September 4–7, 2020
- Website: Telluride Film Festival

Telluride Film Festival
- 48th 46th

The 47th Telluride Film Festival was scheduled to take place from September 4 to 7, 2020, in Telluride, Colorado.

In May 2020, it was announced that the festival would kick off a day earlier on September 3 for safety purposes. However, due to the COVID-19 pandemic in Colorado, the festival announced its cancellation on July 14.

The Telluride Film Festival Silver Medallion was due to honor Chinese filmmaker Chloé Zhao, British actor Anthony Hopkins, and British actress Kate Winslet.

The festival announced the year's initial line-up on August 3. Ammonite and Concrete Cowboy were set to world premiere at the festival, but the two films were only screened for the first time at the 2020 Toronto International Film Festival instead. Nomadland was also set to premiere at the festival, but it premiered at the 77th Venice International Film Festival. By late September, Telluride held a drive-in screening of the latter at the Rose Bowl in Los Angeles.

== Official selections ==
The following films were set to screen at the festival before its cancellation.

=== Main Program ===
English Title	Original Title	Director(s)	Production Country
After Love		Aleem Khan	United Kingdom
All In: The Fight for Democracy		Liz Garbus and Lisa Cortés	United States
The Alpinist		Peter Mortimer and Nick Rosen	United States
Ammonite		Francis Lee	United Kingdom
Andrey Tarkovsky. A Cinema Prayer (Note: These films eventually screened at the 48th Telluride Film Festival.)	Андрей Тарковский. Кино как молитва	Andrey A. Tarkovsky	Italy, Russia, Sweden
Apples	Μήλα	Christos Nikou	Greece, Poland, Slovenia
The Automat		Lisa Hurwitz	United States
Bee Gees: How Can You Mend a Broken Heart		Frank Marshall	United States
Charlatan	Šarlatán	Agnieszka Holland	Czech Republic, Ireland, Poland, Slovakia
Concrete Cowboy		Ricky Staub	United States
Dear Mr. Brody		Keith Maitland	United States
The Duke		Roger Michell	United Kingdom
The Father		Florian Zeller	United Kingdom, France
Fireball: Visitors from Darker Worlds		Werner Herzog and Clive Oppenheimer	United Kingdom, United States
Ibrahim		Samir Guesmi	France
Mainstream		Gia Coppola	United States
Mandibles	Mandibules	Quentin Dupieux	France
MLK/FBI		Sam Pollard	United States
The Most Beautiful Boy in the World	Världens vackraste pojke	Kristina Lindström and Kristian Petri	Sweden
Never Gonna Snow Again	Śniegu już nigdy nie będzie	Małgorzata Szumowska and Michał Englert	Poland, Germany
Nomadland		Chloé Zhao	United States
Notturno		Gianfranco Rosi	Italy, France, Germany
Pray Away		Kristine Stolakis	United States
There Is No Evil	شیطان وجود ندارد	Mohammad Rasoulof	Germany, Iran, Czech Republic
To the Moon		Tadhg O'Sullivan	Ireland
Torn		Max Lowe	United States
The Truffle Hunters		Michael Dweck and Gregory Kershaw	Italy, United States, Greece
Truman & Tennessee: An Intimate Conversation		Lisa Immordino Vreeland	United States
The Way I See It		Dawn Porter	United States

=== Long Shorts ===
Title	Director(s)	Production Country
The Letter Room	Elvira Lind	United States
Linda and the Mockingbirds	James Keach	United States
Paws in Prison	Bill Guttentag	United States
The Toxic Pigs of Fukushima	Otto Bell	Japan, United States
When We Were Bullies	Jay Rosenblatt	United States

=== Student Prints ===
The selection was curated and introduced by Gregory Nava. It selected the best student-produced work around the world.

Title	Director(s)	Universitie(s)
Border	Shu Zhu and Ino Yang Popper	American Film Institute
Forever	Mitch McGlocklin	University of South Carolina
Metamorphosis	Xi Wang	University of South Carolina
Peeps	Sophie Somerville	Victorian College of the Arts
Silento	Esteban García Vernaza	Columbia University
Something to Believe In	Fany de la Chica	Columbia University
Under the Heavens	Gustavo Milan	New York University
Viktor on the Moon	Christian Arhoff	National Film School of Denmark

=== Great Expectations ===
The selection was curated by Barry Jenkins.

Title	Director(s)	Production Country
Da Yie	Anthony Nti	Belgium, Ghana
Gramercy	Jamil McGinnis and Pat Heywood	United States
Unforgivable	Marlén Viñayo	El Salvador

=== Calling Cards ===
The selection was curated by Barry Jenkins.

Title	Director(s)	Production Country
Benjamin, Benny, Ben	Paul Shkordoff	Canada
Bittu	Karishma Dev Dube	India, United States
Community Gardens	Vytautas Katkus	Lithuania
David	Zachary Woods	United States
I, Julia	Arvin Kananian	Sweden
Leave of Absence	Anton Sazonov	Russia
The Lost Astronaut	Ben Proudfoot	United States

== Official Awards ==
- Silver Medallion:
  - Chloé Zhao
  - Anthony Hopkins
  - Kate Winslet
