= Corridors of Power =

Corridors of Power or Power corridor may refer to centres of government or power authority as a phrase. It may also refer to:

- The Corridors of Power (film), documentary film and television series by Dror Moreh
- Corridors of Power (album), an album by Gary Moore
- Corridors of Power (novel), a novel by C.P. Snow
- Corridors of Power (TV series), an Australian television mockumentary comedy series
- Corridors of Power: Should America Police the World? (TV series), a documentary series directed by Dror Moreh
- Corridors of Power, a PC game running on the Retribution Engine
