= 43rd Telluride Film Festival =

2016 film festival

- Location: Telluride, Colorado, United States
- Founded: 1974
- Awards: Telluride Film Festival Silver Medallion: Casey Affleck; Amy Adams; Pablo Larraín
- Hosted by: National Film Preserve Ltd.
- Festival date: September 2–5, 2016
- Website: Telluride Film Festival

Telluride Film Festival
- 44th 42nd

The 43rd Telluride Film Festival took place from September 2 to 5, 2016, in Telluride, Colorado.

German filmmaker Volker Schlöndorff was chosen as the edition's guest director, and selected six classic films for a parallel section.

The Telluride Film Festival Silver Medallion was presented to American actors Casey Affleck and Amy Adams, alongside Chilean filmmaker Pablo Larraín.

== Official selections ==
The official line-up was announced, as usual, on the day before the festival's official opening, on September 1, 2016.

=== Main Program ===
The following films were selected to be screened:

English Title	Original Title	Director(s)	Production Country
Arrival		Denis Villeneuve	United States
The B-Side: Elsa Dorfman's Portrait Photography		Errol Morris	United States
Bleed for This		Ben Younger	United States
California Typewriter		Doug Nichol	United States
Chasing Trane: The John Coltrane Documentary		John Scheinfeld	United States
The End of Eden		Angus Macqueen	United Kingdom
Finding Oscar		Ryan Suffern	United States
Fire at Sea	Fuocoammare	Gianfranco Rosi	Italy, France
Frantz		François Ozon	France
Gentleman Rissient		Benoît Jacquot, Pascal Merigeau and Guy Seligmann	France
Graduation	Bacalaureat	Cristian Mungiu	Romania, France, Belgium
Into the Inferno		Werner Herzog	United Kingdom, Germany
The Ivory Game		Kief Davidson and Richard Ladkani	Austria, United States
La La Land		Damien Chazelle	United States
Lost in Paris	Paris pieds nus	Dominique Abel and Fiona Gordon	France, Belgium
Manchester by the Sea		Kenneth Lonergan	United States
Maudie		Aisling Walsh	Canada, Ireland
Men: A Love Story		Mimi Chakarova	United States
Moonlight		Barry Jenkins	United States
My Journey Through French Cinema	Voyage à travers le cinéma français	Bertrand Tavernier	France
Neruda		Pablo Larraín	Chile, Argentina, France, Spain
Norman	נורמן: עלייתו המתונה ונפילתו התלולה של מאכער אמריקאי	Joseph Cedar	United States, Israel
Sully		Clint Eastwood	United States
Things to Come	L'Avenir	Mia Hansen-Løve	France, Germany
The Wedding Plan	לעבור את הקיר	Rama Burshtein	United States, Israel
Toni Erdmann		Maren Ade	Germany, Austria
Una		Benedict Andrews	United Kingdom
Variety (1925)	Varieté	E. A. Dupont	Germany
Wakefield		Robin Swicord	United States
The Pagnol Trilogy
César (1936)		Marcel Pagnol	France
Fanny (1932)		Marc Allégret	France
Marius (1931)		Alexander Korda	France

=== Guest Director's Selections ===
The following films were selected and presented by the year's guest director, German filmmaker Volker Schlöndorff:

English Title	Original Title	Director(s)	Production Country
The Barefoot Contessa (1954)		Joseph L. Mankiewicz	United States
The Fire Within (1963)	Le Feu follet	Louis Malle	France
I Was Nineteen (1968)	Ich war neunzehn	Konrad Wolf	East Germany
It Was in May (1970)	Был месяц май	Marlen Khutsiev	Soviet Union
Spies (1928)	Spione	Fritz Lang	Germany
The Strange Ones (1950)	Les Enfants terribles	Jean-Pierre Melville	France

=== Filmmakers of Tomorrow ===
==== Student Prints ====
The selection was curated and introduced by Gregory Nava. It selected the best student-produced work around the world. The following films were selected to be screened:

English Title	Original Title	Director(s)	Universitie(s)
And the Whole Sky Fit in the Dead Cow's Eye		Francisca Alegría	Columbia University
Edmond		Nina Gantz	National Film and Television School
Icebox		Daniel Sawka	American Film Institute
Nocturne in Black		Jimmy Keyrouz	Columbia University
State of Emergency	Un état d'urgence	Tarek Roehlinger	Filmakademie Baden-Württemberg
Tear of the Peony		Yuxi Li	Columbia University

==== Calling Cards ====
The selection was curated by Barry Jenkins. It selected new works from promising filmmakers. The following films were selected to be screened:

Title	Director(s)	Production Country
4.1 Miles	Daphne Matziaraki	United States, Greece
Asunder	Nathalie Álvarez Mesén	Sweden
A Coat Made Dark	Jack O'Shea	Ireland
Fais le mort	William Laboury	France
The Last Leatherman of the Vale of Cashmere	Greg Loser	United States
Little Bullets	Alphan Eşeli	Turkey
Rhonna and Donna	Daina Oniunas-Pusić	United Kingdom

==== Great Expectations ====
The selection was curated by Barry Jenkins. The following films were selected to be screened:

Title	Director(s)	Production Country
Dirt	Darius Clark Monroe	United States
The Gambler	Karim Lakzadeh	Iran
Le Gouffre	Vincent Le Port	France

=== Frontlot/Backlot ===
The selection included behind-the-scene movies and portraits of artists, musicians, and filmmakers. The following films were selected to be screened:

Title	Director(s)	Production Country
Beauties of the Night	María José Cuevas	Mexico
Bernadette Lafont and God Created the Free Woman	Esther Hoffenberg	France
Bright Lights: Starring Carrie Fisher and Debbie Reynolds	Alexis Bloom, Fisher Stevens	United States
Cool Cats	Janus Køster-Rasmussen	Denmark
The Family Whistle	Michele Salfi Russo	United States, Italy
A Fanatic Heart – Bob Geldof on William Butler Yeats	Gerry Hoban	Ireland
Gulag	Angus Macqueen	United Kingdom
I Called Him Morgan	Kasper Collin	Sweden, United States
Jerry Lewis: The Man Behind the Clown	Gregory Monro	France
Mifune: The Last Samurai	Steven Okazaki	United States

== Official Awards ==
- Silver Medallion:
  - Casey Affleck
  - Amy Adams
  - Pablo Larraín
