= 46th Telluride Film Festival =

2019 film festival

- Location: Telluride, Colorado, United States
- Founded: 1974
- Awards: Telluride Film Festival Silver Medallion: Renée Zellweger; Adam Driver; Philip Kaufman
- Hosted by: National Film Preserve Ltd.
- Festival date: August 30 – September 2, 2019
- Website: Telluride Film Festival

Telluride Film Festival
- 47th 45th

The 46th Telluride Film Festival took place from August 30 to September 2, 2019, in Telluride, Colorado.

British author Pico Iyer was chosen as the edition's guest director, and selected six classic films for a parallel section.

The Telluride Film Festival Silver Medallion was presented to American actress Renée Zellweger, American actor Adam Driver, and American filmmaker Philip Kaufman. Sound studio Dolby Laboratories received the Special Medallion award.

== Official selections ==
The official line-up was announced, as usual, on the day before the festival's official opening.

=== Main Program ===
The following films were selected to be screened:

English Title	Original Title	Director(s)	Production Country
The Aeronauts		Tom Harper	United States, United Kingdom
The Assistant		Kitty Green	United States
The Australian Dream		Daniel Gordon	Australia, United Kingdom
Beanpole	Дылда	Kantemir Balagov	Russia
The Climb		Michael Angelo Covino	United States
Country Music (Episode: "The Sons and Daughters of America (1964-1968)")		Ken Burns	United States
Coup 53		Taghi Amirani	United Kingdom
Diego Maradona		Asif Kapadia	United Kingdom
Family Romance, LLC		Werner Herzog	United States, Japan
First Cow		Kelly Reichardt	United States
Ford v Ferrari		James Mangold	United States
A Hidden Life		Terrence Malick	United States, Germany
The Human Factor		Dror Moreh	United Kingdom
Inside Bill's Brain: Decoding Bill Gates (Episodes 1 and 3)		Davis Guggenheim	United States
Judy		Rupert Goold	United Kingdom, United States
The Kingmaker		Lauren Greenfield	United States
The Last Vermeer		Dan Friedkin	United States
Marriage Story		Noah Baumbach	United States
Motherless Brooklyn		Edward Norton	United States
Oliver Sacks: His Own Life		Ric Burns	United States
Pain and Glory	Dolor y gloria	Pedro Almodóvar	Spain
Parasite	기생충	Bong Joon-ho	South Korea
The Phantom Carriage (1921)	Körkarlen	Victor Sjöström	Sweden
Portrait of a Lady on Fire	Portrait de la jeune fille en feu	Céline Sciamma	France
The Report		Scott Z. Burns	United States
Tell Me Who I Am		Ed Perkins	United Kingdom
Those Who Remained	Akik maradtak	Barnabás Tóth	Hungary
The Two Popes		Fernando Meirelles	United Kingdom, United States, Italy, Argentina
The Unbearable Lightness of Being (1988)		Philip Kaufman	United States
Uncut Gems		Josh and Benny Safdie	United States
Varda by Agnès	Varda par Agnès	Agnès Varda	France
Verdict		Raymund Ribay Gutierrez	Philippines
Waves		Trey Edward Shults	United States
The Wind (1928)		Victor Sjöström	United States
Women Make Film		Mark Cousins	United Kingdom
Brave Souls: Three Shorts
Fire in Paradise		Zackary Canepari and Drea Cooper	United States
Into the Fire		Orlando von Einsiedel	United Kingdom, United States
Lost and Found		Orlando von Einsiedel	United Kingdom, United States

=== Guest Director's Selections ===
The following films were selected and presented by the year's guest director, Pico Iyer:

English Title	Original Title	Director(s)	Production Country
Late Autumn (1960)	秋日和	Yasujirō Ozu	Japan
The Makioka Sisters (1983)	細雪	Kon Ichikawa	Japan
Mr. and Mrs. Iyer (2002)		Aparna Sen	India
Under the Sun (2015)	В лучах солнца / 태양 아래	Vitaly Mansky	Czech Republic, Russia, Germany, Latvia, North Korea
When a Woman Ascends the Stairs (1960)	女が階段を上る時	Mikio Naruse	Japan

=== Filmmakers of Tomorrow ===
==== Student Prints ====
The selection was curated and introduced by Gregory Nava, it selected the best student-produced work around the world. The following films were selected to be screened:

Title	Director(s)	Universitie(s)
Alien	Jegwang Yeon	Korea National University of Arts
Boléro	Sarah Gross	University of Southern California
Mizaru	Sudarshan Suresh	Columbia University
No Body	Haemin Ko	University of the Arts London
Night Swim	Victoria Rivera	Columbia University
Soukoon	Farah Shaer	University of California, Los Angeles
Under Darkness	Caroline Friend	University of Southern California

==== Calling Cards ====
The selection was curated by Barry Jenkins and presented by Nick O'Neill, and selected new works from promising filmmakers. The following films were selected to be screened:

Title	Director(s)	Production Country
Chubby	Madeleine Sims-Fewer and Dusty Mancinelli	Canada
The Distance Between Us and the Sky	Vasilis Kekatos	Greece, France
Laukais	Kamile Milašiūtė	Lithuania
Manicure	Arman Fayyaz	Iran
Olla	Ariane Labed	France
Rain	Piotr Milczarek	Poland

==== Great Expectations ====
The selection was curated by Barry Jenkins and presented by Nick O'Neill. The following films were selected to be screened:

Title	Director(s)	Production Country
Drive	Pedro Casavecchia	Argentina, France
Feathers	A.V. Rockwell	United States
House of Glass	Filipe Martins	Portugal
Riviera	Jonas Schloesing	France
A Treatise on the Human Animal No. 38: Heartache	Jacob Møller	Denmark

=== Backlot ===
The selection included behind-the-scene movies and portraits of artists, musicians, and filmmakers. The following films were selected to be screened:

Title	Director(s)	Production Country
63 Up	Michael Apted	United Kingdom
Billie	James Erskine	United Kingdom
Black Panthers	Agnès Varda	France, United States
Chulas Fronteras	Les Blank	United States
The Gift: The Journey of Johnny Cash	Thom Zimny	United States
Linda Ronstadt: The Sound of My Voice	Jeffrey Friedman and Rob Epstein	United States
Nomad: In the Footsteps of Bruce Chatwin	Werner Herzog	United States
Soros	Jesse Dylan	United States
Uncle Yanco	Agnès Varda	France, United States

=== Festivities ===
The following films were selected to be screened:

Title	Director(s)	Production Country
Amazing Grace (2018)	Alan Elliott	United States
The Right Stuff (1983)	Philip Kaufman	United States
The Wanderers (1979)	Philip Kaufman	United States

== Official Awards ==
- Silver Medallion:
  - Renée Zellweger
  - Adam Driver
  - Philip Kaufman
- Special Medallion: Dolby Laboratories
