= 45th Telluride Film Festival =

2018 film festival

- Location: Telluride, Colorado, United States
- Founded: 1974
- Awards: Telluride Film Festival Silver Medallion: Alfonso Cuarón; Emma Stone; Rithy Panh
- Hosted by: National Film Preserve Ltd.
- Festival date: August 31 – September 3, 2018
- Website: Telluride Film Festival

Telluride Film Festival
- 46th 44th

The 45th Telluride Film Festival took place from August 31 to September 3, 2018 in Telluride, Colorado, United States.

American novelist Jonathan Lethem was chosen as the edition's guest director, and selected six classic films for a parallel section.

The Telluride Film Festival Silver Medallion was presented to Mexican filmmaker Alfonso Cuarón, American actress Emma Stone, and Cambodian filmmaker Rithy Panh.

== Official selections ==
The official line-up was announced, as usual, on the day before the festival's official opening.

=== Main Program ===
The following films were selected to be screened:

English Title	Original Title	Director(s)	Production Country
Angels Are Made of Light		James Longley	United States, Denmark, Norway
Be Natural: The Untold Story of Alice Guy-Blaché		Pamela B. Green	United States
The Biggest Little Farm		John Chester	United States
Birds of Passage	Pájaros de verano	Ciro Guerra and Cristina Gallego	Colombia-Denmark-Mexico
Border	Gräns	Ali Abbasi	Sweden
Boy Erased		Joel Edgerton	United States
Can You Ever Forgive Me?		Marielle Heller	United States
Christian Wahnschaffe (1920-1921)		Urban Gad	Germany
Cœur fidèle (1923)		Jean Epstein	France
Cold War	Zimna wojna	Paweł Pawlikowski	Poland, France, United Kingdom
Destroyer		Karyn Kusama	United States
Dogman		Matteo Garrone	Italy, France
Dovlatov	Довлатов	Aleksei German	Russia, Poland, Serbia
Eldorado		Markus Imhoof	Germany, Switzerland
The Favourite		Yorgos Lanthimos	Ireland, United Kingdom, United States
Fièvre (1921)		Louis Delluc	France
First Man		Damien Chazelle	United States
Fistful of Dirt		Sebastián Silva	United States
Free Solo		Elizabeth Chai Vasarhelyi and Jimmy Chin	United States
The Front Runner		Jason Reitman	United States
Ghost Fleet		Shannon Service and Jeffrey Waldron	United States
Girl		Lukas Dhont	Belgium, Netherlands
Graves Without a Name	Les tombeaux sans noms	Rithy Panh	France, Cambodia
The Great Buster		Peter Bogdanovich	United States
Meeting Gorbachev		Werner Herzog and André Singer	United Kingdom, United States, Germany
Non-Fiction	Doubles vies	Olivier Assayas	France
The Old Man & the Gun		David Lowery	United States
The Other Side of the Wind		Orson Welles	United States, France
Peterloo		Mike Leigh	United Kingdom
Reversing Roe		Ricki Stern and Anne Sundberg	United States
Roma		Alfonso Cuarón	Mexico, United States
Shoplifters	万引き家族	Hirokazu Kore-eda	Japan
They'll Love Me When I'm Dead		Morgan Neville	United States
Trial by Fire		Ed Zwick	United States
Watergate – Or, How We Learned to Stop an Out-of-Control President		Charles Ferguson	United States
Whirlpool of Desire (1935)	Remous	Edmond T. Gréville	France
White Boy Rick		Yann Demange	United States
The White Crow		Ralph Fiennes	United Kingdom, France, Croatia, Serbia

=== Guest Director's Selections ===
The following films were selected and presented by the year's guest director, Jonathan Lethem:

English Title	Original Title	Director(s)	Production Country
Angel (1937)		Ernst Lubitsch	United States
Bigger Than Life (1956)		Nicholas Ray	United States
Never Cry Wolf (1983)		Carroll Ballard	United States
The Tarnished Angels (1957)		Douglas Sirk	United States
To Be or Not to Be (1942)		Ernst Lubitsch	United States
The White Meadows (2009)	کشتزارهای سپید	Mohammad Rasoulof	Iran

=== Backlot ===
The films were selected and presented by Jeffrey Keil and Danielle Pinet. The selection included behind-the-scene movies and portraits of artists, musicians, and filmmakers. The following films were selected to be screened:

English Title	Original Title	Director(s)	Production Country
The Eyes of Orson Welles		Mark Cousins	United Kingdom
A Final Cut for Orson		Ryan Suffern	United States
The Ghost of Peter Sellers		Peter Medak	United Kingdom, Cyprus
Hal		Amy Scott	United States
Hugh Hefner's After Dark: Speaking Out in America		Brigitte Berman	Canada
It Must Schwing! The Blue Note Story	It Must Schwing - Die Blue Note Story	Eric Friedler	Germany
What She Said: The Art of Pauline Kael		Rob Garver	United States

=== Filmmakers of Tomorrow ===
==== Student Prints ====
The selection was curated and introduced by Gregory Nava, including the best student-produced work around the world. The following films were selected to be screened:

English title	Original title	Director(s)	Universitie(s)
Lalo's House		Kelley Kali	University of Southern California
My Nephew Emmett		Kevin Wilson Jr.	New York University
Tracing Addai		Esther Neimeier	Konrad Wolf Film University of Babelsberg
The Victory of Charity	Der Sieg der Barmherzigkeit	Albert Meisl	University of Music and Performing Arts Vienna
A Year		Jisun Jamie Kim	New York University

==== Calling Cards ====
The selection was curated by Barry Jenkins and presented by Nick O'Neill, including new works from promising filmmakers. The following films were selected to be screened:

English Title	Original Title	Director(s)	Production Country
The Ambassador's Wife		Theresa Dahlberg	Sweden
Caroline		Logan George and Celine Held	United States
Fauve		Jérémy Comte	Canada
The Field		Sandhya Suri	France, United Kingdom, India
Mother Of		Gan de Lange	Israel
Third Kind		Yorgos Zois	Greece, Croatia

==== Great Expectations ====
The selection was curated by Barry Jenkins and presented by Nick O'Neill. The following films were selected to be screened:

English Title	Original Title	Director(s)	Production Country
Braguino		Clément Cogitore	France, Finland
Dark Chamber		Ottó Bánovits	Sweden
This Magnificent Cake!	Ce magnifique gâteau!	Emma de Swaef and Marc James Roels	Belgium, France, Netherlands

==== Introducing Saba Riazi ====
The section was intended to highlight the work by Iranian filmmaker Saba Riazi. The following films were selected to be screened:

English Title	Original Title	Director(s)	Production Country
Ice Cream		Saba Riazi	United States, Iran
The Wind is Blowing on My Street (2010)		Saba Riazi	Iran, United States

== Official Awards ==
- Silver Medallion:
  - Alfonso Cuarón
  - Emma Stone
  - Rithy Panh
- Special Medallion: Dieter Kosslick
