= Telluride Film Festival Silver Medallion =

Film festival honorary award

The Silver Medallion is an award given by the Telluride Film Festival in recognition of yearly achievements in the film industry.

== History ==
The first Silver Medallions were awarded in 1974 at the 1st Telluride Film Festival. They are made of pure silver and the design has never changed, featuring the emblematic "SHOW" logo on their face. The presentation of the medallion is preceded by a clip reel, full feature and/or on stage interview. Traditionally, three Silver Medallions are given out each year, with a few exceptions where numerous people from a specific category were paid the honor. Since 1981, a fourth Silver Medallion, the Special Medallion, has been awarded to a hero of cinema, a filmmaker, historian, critic, or organization dedicated to the celebration and preservation of film as an art.

== Honorees ==
=== 1970s ===
Year	Recipient		Profession	Nationality
1974	Francis Ford Coppola		Filmmaker	United States
1974	Gloria Swanson		Actress	United States
1974	Leni Riefenstahl		Filmmaker	West Germany
1975	Henry King		Filmmaker	United States
1975	Jack Nicholson		Actor	United States
1975	Werner Herzog		Filmmaker	West Germany
1976	Chuck Jones		Animator	United States
1976	King Kong		Fictional character	United States
1976	King Vidor		Filmmaker	United States
1977	Agnes Varda		Filmmaker	France
1977	Ben Carré		Painter	France
1977	Michael Powell		Filmmaker	United Kingdom
1978	The Czech New Wave	Jaromil Jireš	Filmmaker	Czechoslovakia
1978	The Czech New Wave	Pavel Jurácek	Filmmaker	Czechoslovakia
1978	The Czech New Wave	Jan Nemec	Filmmaker	Czechoslovakia
1978	The Czech New Wave	Ivan Passer	Filmmaker	Czechoslovakia
1978	Hal Roach		Filmmaker	United States
1978	Sterling Hayden		Actor	United States
1979	Abel Gance		Filmmaker	France
1979	Klaus Kinski		Actor	West Germany
1979	Robert Wise		Filmmaker	United States

=== 1980s ===
Year	Recipient		Profession	Nationality
1980	Karl Strauss		Brewer	Germany, United States
1980	Maurice Pialat		Filmmaker	France
1980	Robert Altman		Filmmaker	United States
1981	The Character Actor	Elisha Cook	Actor	United States
1981	The Character Actor	John Carrdine	Actor	United States
1981	The Character Actor	Margaret Hamilton	Actress	United States
1981	The Character Actor	Woody Strode	Actor	United States
1981	Carlos Diegues		Filmmaker	Brazil
1981	Dusan Makavejev		Filmmaker	Yugoslavia
1982	Athol Fugard		Writer	South Africa
1982	Joel McCrea		Actor	United States
1982	Pierre Braunberger		Actor and producer	France
1983	Andrei Tarkovsky		Filmmaker	Soviet Union
1983	Luis Trenker		Filmmaker, producer and actor	Italy
1983	Richard Widmark		Actor and producer	United States
1984	Andrzej Wajda		Filmmaker	Poland
1984	Henry Hathaway		Filmmaker	United States
1984	Janet Leigh		Actress	United States
1985	Alexander Trauner		Production designer	Hungary
1985	Emilio Fernandez		Filmmaker	Mexico
1985	Hanna Schygulla		Actress	West Germany
1986	Alexander Mackendrick		Filmmaker	United Kingdom
1986	Isabelle Huppert		Actress	France
1986	Jirí Menzel		Filmmaker	Czechoslovakia
1987	Don Siegel		Filmmaker	United States
1987	Tenghiz Abuladze		Filmmaker	Soviet Union
1987	Stephen Frears		Filmmaker	United Kingdom
1988	Cab Calloway		Musician	United States
1988	Pedro Almodóvar		Filmmaker	Spain
1988	The Xi'an Studio		Studio	China
1989	Dennis Potter		Writer	United Kingdom
1989	Peter Greenaway		Filmmaker	United Kingdom
1989	Shohei Imamura		Filmmaker	Japan

=== 1990s ===
Year	Recipient		Profession	Nationality	Ref.
1990	Clint Eastwood		Actor and filmmaker	United States	
1990	Gérard Depardieu		Actor	France	
1990	John Berry		Filmmaker	United States	
1991	Jodie Foster		Actress	United States	
1991	Nature's Filmmakers	Marion Zunz	Filmmaker	United States	
1991	Nature's Filmmakers	Paul Atkins	Filmmaker	United States	
1991	Nature's Filmmakers	Peter Jones	Filmmaker	United States	
1991	Sven Nykvist		Cinematographer	Switzerland	
1992	Cy Endfield		Filmmaker	United States, United Kingdom	
1992	Elmer Bernstein		Composer	United States	
1992	Harvey Keitel		Actor	United States	
1993	Jennifer Jason Leigh		Actress	United States	
1993	John Alton		Cinematographer	Hungary, United States	
1993	Ken Loach		Filmmaker	United Kingdom	
1994	Harriet Andersson		Actress	Sweden	
1994	Judy Davis		Actress	Australia	
1994	Ken Burns		Filmmaker	United States	
1995	John Schlesinger		Filmmaker	United Kingdom	
1995	The Surrealists	Guy Maddin	Filmmaker	Canada	
1995	The Surrealists	Jan Svankmajer	Filmmaker	Czech Republic	
1995	The Surrealists	Stephen Quay	Filmmaker	United States	
1995	The Surrealists	Timothy Quay	Filmmaker	United States	
1995	Zhang Yimou		Filmmaker	China	
1996	Alain Cavalier		Filmmaker	France	
1996	Mike Leigh		Filmmaker	United Kingdom	
1996	Shirley MacLaine		Actress	United States	
1997	Alexander Sokurov		Filmmaker	Russia	
1997	Horton Foote		Writer	United States	
1997	Neil Jordan		Filmmaker	Ireland	
1998	Meryl Streep		Actress	United States	
1998	Susumu Hani		Filmmaker	Japan	
1998	Vittorio Storaro		Cinematographer	Italy	
1999	Catherine Deneuve		Actress	France	
1999	David Lynch		Filmmaker	United States	
1999	Philip Glass		Composer	United States	

=== 2000s ===
Year	Recipient	Profession	Nationality	Ref.
2000	Ang Lee	Filmmaker	Taiwan	
2000	Im Kwon-taek	Filmmaker	South Korea	
2000	Stellan Skarsgard	Actor	Sweden	
2001	Catherine Breillat	Filmmaker	France	
2001	Ken Russell	Filmmaker	United Kingdom	
2001	Om Puri	Actor	India	
2002	D.A. Pennebaker	Filmmaker	United States	
2002	Paul Schrader	Filmmaker	United States	
2002	Peter O'Toole	Actor	United Kingdom	
2003	Krzysztof Zanussi	Filmmaker	Poland	
2003	Peter Brook	Filmmaker	United Kingdom	
2003	Toni Collette	Actress	Australia	
2004	Jean-Claude Carrière	Writer	France	
2004	Laura Linney	Actress	United States	
2004	Theodoros Angelopoulos	Filmmaker	Greece	
2005	Charlotte Rampling	Actress	United Kingdom	
2005	Jean-Pierre and Luc Dardenne	Filmmaker	Belgium	
2005	Mickey Rooney	Actor	United States	
2006	Penélope Cruz	Actress	Spain	
2006	Rolf de Heer	Filmmaker	Australia, Netherlands	
2006	Walter Murch	Editor and sound designer	United States	
2007	Daniel Day-Lewis	Actor	United Kingdom	
2007	Michel Legrand	Composer	France	
2007	Shyam Benegal	Filmmaker	India	
2008	David Fincher	Filmmaker	United States	
2008	Jan Troell	Filmmaker	Sweden	
2008	Jean Simmons	Actress	United States	
2009	Anouk Aimée	Actress	France	
2009	Margarethe von Trotta	Filmmaker	Germany	
2009	Viggo Mortensen	Actor	United States	

=== 2010s ===
Year	Recipient	Profession	Nationality	Ref.
2010	Claudia Cardinale	Actress	Italy, Tunisia	
2010	Colin Firth	Actor	United Kingdom	
2010	Peter Weir	Filmmaker	Australia	
2011	George Clooney	Actor and filmmaker	United States	
2011	Pierre Étaix	Filmmaker and comedian	France	
2011	Tilda Swinton	Actress	United Kingdom	
2012	Roger Corman	Filmmaker	United States	
2012	Mads Mikkelsen	Actor	Denmark	
2012	Marion Cotillard	Actress	France	
2013	Ethan and Joel Coen	Filmmaker	United States	
2013	Mohammad Rasoulof	Filmmaker	Iran	
2013	Robert Redford	Actor and filmmaker	United States	
2013	T Bone Burnett	Composer and producer	United States	
2014	Apocalypse Now	Feature film	United States	
2014	Hilary Swank	Actress	United States	
2014	Volker Schlöndorff	Filmmaker	Germany	
2015	Adam Curtis	Filmmaker	United Kingdom	
2015	Danny Boyle	Filmmaker	United Kingdom	
2015	Rooney Mara	Actress	United States	
2016	Amy Adams	Actress	United States	
2016	Casey Affleck	Actor	United States	
2016	Pablo Larraín	Filmmaker	Chile	
2017	Christian Bale	Actor	United Kingdom	
2017	Edward Lachman	Cinematographer	United States	
2018	Alfonso Cuarón	Filmmaker	Mexico	
2018	Emma Stone	Actress	United States	
2018	Rithy Panh	Filmmaker	Cambodia	
2019	Adam Driver	Actor	United States	
2019	Philip Kaufman	Filmmaker	United States	
2019	Renée Zellweger	Actress	United States	

=== 2020s ===
Year	Recipient	Profession	Nationality	Ref.
2020 (cancelled)	Anthony Hopkins	Actor	United Kingdom	
2020 (cancelled)	Chloé Zhao	Filmmaker	United States	
2020 (cancelled)	Kate Winslet	Actress	United Kingdom	
2021	Jane Campion	Filmmaker	New Zealand	
2021	Peter Dinklage	Actor	United States	
2021	Riz Ahmed	Actor	United Kingdom	
2022	Cate Blanchett	Actress	Australia	
2022	Mark Cousins	Filmmaker	United Kingdom	
2022	Sarah Polley	Filmmaker	United States	
2023	Alice Rohrwacher	Filmmaker	Italy	
2023	Yorgos Lanthimos	Filmmaker	Greece	
2023	Wim Wenders	Filmmaker	Germany	
2024	Jacques Audiard	Filmmaker	France	
2024	Saoirse Ronan	Actress	Ireland	
2024	Thelma Schoonmaker	Editor	United States	
2025	Ethan Hawke	Actor	United States	
2025	Jafar Panahi	Filmmaker	Iran	
2025	Noah Baumbach	Filmmaker	United States	
2026	Andrew Haigh	Filmmaker	United Kingdom	
2026	John Malkovich	Actor	United States	
2026	Sandra Hüller	Actress	Germany	

== Special Medallion ==
The first ever Special Medallion was only awarded in 1981.

=== 1980s ===
Year	Recipients	Profession	Nationality
1981	Kevin Brownlow	Filmmaker	United Kingdom
1981	Stan Brakhage	Filmmaker	United States
1983	Irwin Young	Businessman	United States
1984	Joseph Losey	Filmmaker	United States
1985	Paul Kohner	Agent and producer	Austria, United States
1989	William K. Everson	Historian	United States

=== 1990s ===
Year	Recipients	Profession	Nationality
1990	Manny Farber	Painter, film critic and writer	United States
1992	Pierre Rissient	Filmmaker	France
1993	Stefan Jarl	Filmmaker	Sweden
1993	Arne Sucksdorff	Filmmaker	Sweden
1994	Ninon Sevilla	Actress	Cuba, Mexico
1995	Andrew Sarris	Film critic	United States
1996	Roger Mayer	Executive	United States
1997	Milos Stehlik	Art historian	United States
1998	Stanley Kauffmann	Writer	United States
1998	Chris Reyna	Actor	United Kingdom
1999	Arena	TV series	United Kingdom

=== 2000s ===
Year	Recipients	Profession	Nationality	Ref.
2000	Elmore Leonard	Writer	United States	
2000	Serge Silberman	Producer	France	
2001	HBO	Television network	United States	
2002	Positif	Film magazine	France	
2003	Ted Turner	Media mogul	United States	
2004	Fred Roos	Producer	United States	
2005	The Criterion Collection	Home video distribution company	United States	
2005	Janus Films	Film distributor	United States	
2006	David Thomson	Film critic	United Kingdom	
2007	Leonard Maltin	Film critic	United States	
2008	Richard Schickel	Film scholar	United States	
2009	Serge Bromberg	Producer	United States	

=== 2010s ===
Year	Recipients	Profession	Nationality	Ref.
2010	UCLA Film & Television Archive	Film and television archive	United States	
2011	Sight and Sound	Film magazine	United Kingdom	
2012	Boston Light & Sound	Audio visual equipment supplier	United States	
2012	C. Chapin Cutler Jr.	Executive	United States	
2013	Alejandro Ramirez	President of the Morelia International Film Festival	Mexico	
2014	Cineteca de Bologna	Film archive	Italy	
2014	Gian Luca Farinelli	Film archivist	Italy	
2015	Participant Media	Production company	United States	
2017	Katriel Schory	President of the Israel Film Fund	Israel	
2018	Dieter Kosslick	Film critic	Germany	
2019	Dolby Laboratories	Audio company	United States	

=== 2020s ===
Year	Recipients	Profession	Nationality	Ref.
2021	Annette Insdorf	Film historian	United States	
2023	The Film Foundation	Film preservation company	United States	
2024	Les Films du Losange	Film production company	France	
2025	Tessa Ross	Producer	United Kingdom	
