= Telluride Film Festival guest directors =

The Telluride Film Festival Guest Director is a position held by a different individual each edition, invited by the festival's artistic director to join them in the creation of the festival program.

Below is a list of each guest director followed by the films the director specifically chose to highlight.

== List of guest directors and selected films ==
=== 1980s ===
Year	Guest Director	English Title	Original Title	Director(s)	Production Country
1988 (15th)	Donald Richie	Japan's Cutting Edge		Various	Japan
1988 (15th)	Donald Richie	Remembering Sessue Hayakawa		Various	Japan
1988 (15th)	Donald Richie	The Dragon Painter (1919)		William Worthington	United States
1989 (16th)	Errol Morris	Henry: Portrait of a Serial Killer (1986)		John McNaughton	United States
1989 (16th)	Errol Morris	Make Way for Tomorrow (1937)		Leo McCarey	United States

=== 1990s ===
Year	Guest Director	English Title	Original Title	Director(s)	Production Country
1990 (17th)	Bertrand Tavernier	Justin de Marseille (1935)		Maurice Tourneur	France
1990 (17th)	Bertrand Tavernier	Pursued (1947)		Raoul Walsh	United States
1991 (18th)	Laurie Anderson	Danzon (1991)		María Novaro	Mexico
1991 (18th)	Laurie Anderson	New Video Art			
1992 (19th)	G. Cabrera Infante	Laughter (1930)		Harry d'Abbadie d'Arrast	United States
1992 (19th)	G. Cabrera Infante	Victims of Sin (1951)	Víctimas del pecado	Emilio Fernández	Mexico
1992 (19th)	G. Cabrera Infante	The Virgin of Charity (1930)	La Virgen de la Caridad	Ramón Peón	Cuba
1993 (20th)	John Boorman	Fear and Desire (1952)		Stanley Kubrick	United States
1993 (20th)	John Boorman	Upstage (1926)		Monta Bell	United States
1994 (21st)	John Simon	The Easy Life (1962)	Il Sorpasso	Dino Risi	Italy
1994 (21st)	John Simon	One Fine Day (1969)	Un certo giorno	Ermanno Olmi	Italy
1994 (21st)	John Simon	They Shoot Horses, Don't They? (1969)		Sydney Pollack	United States
1995 (22nd)	Phillip Lopate	Floating Clouds (1955)	浮雲	Mikio Naruse	Japan
1995 (22nd)	Phillip Lopate	The Hard Way (1943)		Vincent Sherman	United States
1995 (22nd)	Phillip Lopate	Welfare (1975)		Frederick Wiseman	United States
1996 (23rd)	B. Ruby Rich				
1997 (24th)	Peter Von Bagh				
1998 (25th)	Peter Bogdanovich				
1999 (26th)	Peter Sellars	Allah Tantou (1992)		David Achkar	Guinea, France
1999 (26th)	Peter Sellars	Dust in the Wind (1986)	戀戀風塵	Hou Hsiao-hsien	Taiwan

=== 2000s ===
Year	Guest Director	English Title	Original Title	Director(s)	Production Country
2000 (27th)	Edgardo Cozarinsky				
2001 (28th)	Salman Rushdie	Metropolis (1927)		Fritz Lang	Germany
2001 (28th)	Salman Rushdie	Alphaville (1965)		Jean-Luc Godard	France
2001 (28th)	Salman Rushdie	Solaris (1972)	Солярис	Andrei Tarkovsky	Soviet Union
2002 (29th)	Alberto Barbera	Bitter Rice (1949)	Riso Amaro	Giuseppe De Santis	Italy
2002 (29th)	Alberto Barbera	Bandits of Orgosolo (1961)	Banditi a Orgosolo	Vittorio De Seta	Italy
2002 (29th)	Alberto Barbera	Il Posto (1961)		Ermanno Olmi	Italy
2003 (30th)	Stephen Sondheim	They Were Five (1936)	La Belle Equipe	Julien Duvivier	France
2003 (30th)	Stephen Sondheim	Un Carnet de Bal (1937)		Julien Duvivier	France
2003 (30th)	Stephen Sondheim	Panique (1946)		Julien Duvivier	France
2004 (31st)	Buck Henry	Million Dollar Legs (1932)		Edward F. Cline	United States
2004 (31st)	Buck Henry	Payday (1932)		Don Carpenter	United States
2004 (31st)	Buck Henry	Hunger (1966)	Sult / Svält	Henning Carlsen	Denmark, Norway, Sweden
2005 (32nd)	Don DeLillo	The Passenger (1975)	Professione: reporter	Michelangelo Antonioni	Italy
2005 (32nd)	Don DeLillo	Wanda (1970)		Barbara Loden	United States
2005 (32nd)	Don DeLillo	The Spirit of the Beehive (1973)	El espíritu de la colmena	Víctor Erice	Spain
2006 (33rd)	Jean-Pierre Gorin	Maldone (1928)		Jean Grémillon	France
2006 (33rd)	Jean-Pierre Gorin	Stormy Waters (1941)	Remorques	Jean Grémillon	France
2006 (33rd)	Jean-Pierre Gorin	Summer Light (1943)	Lumière d'Ètè	Jean Grémillon	France
2007 (34th)	Edith Kramer	The Way You Wanted Me (1944)	Sellaisena kuin sinä minut halusit	Teuvo Tulio	Finland
2007 (34th)	Edith Kramer	Millions Like Us (1943)		Sidney Gilliat and Frank Launder	United Kingdom
2007 (34th)	Edith Kramer	Spring Shower (1932)	Tavaszi zápor	Pál Fejös	Hungary
2008 (35th)	Slavoj Žižek	Nightmare Alley (1947)		Edmund Golding	United States
2008 (35th)	Slavoj Žižek	On Dangerous Ground (1952)		Nicholas Ray	United States
2008 (35th)	Slavoj Žižek	Seconds (1966)		John Frankenheimer	United States
2009 (36th)	Alexander Payne	Day of the Outlaw (1959)		Stelios Roccos and James Burroughs	United States
2009 (36th)	Alexander Payne	The Breaking Point (1950)		Michael Curtiz	United States
2009 (36th)	Alexander Payne	Make Way for Tomorrow (1937)		Leo McCarey	United States

=== 2010s ===
Year	Guest Director	English Title	Original Title	Director(s)	Production Country
2010 (37th)	Michael Ondaatje	The Ascent (1977)	Восхождение	Larisa Shepitko	Soviet Union
2010 (37th)	Michael Ondaatje	Confidence (1980)	Bizalom	István Szabó	Hungary
2010 (37th)	Michael Ondaatje	Here Is Your Life (1966)	Här har du ditt liv	Jan Troell	Sweden
2010 (37th)	Michael Ondaatje	Fat City (1972)		John Huston	United States
2010 (37th)	Michael Ondaatje	The Hustler (1961)		Robert Rossen	United States
2010 (37th)	Michael Ondaatje	Mother Dao, the Turtlelike (1995)	Moeder Dao, de schildpadgelijkende	Vincent Monnikendam	Netherlands
2011 (38th)	Caetano Veloso	The Apartment (1960)		Billy Wilder	United States
2011 (38th)	Caetano Veloso	Aniceto (2008)		Leonardo Favio	Argentina
2011 (38th)	Caetano Veloso	Vivre sa vie (1962)		Jean-Luc Godard	France
2011 (38th)	Caetano Veloso	The Grand Maneuver (1955)	Les Grandes Manœuvres	René Clair	France
2011 (38th)	Caetano Veloso	Black God, White Devil (1964)	Deus e o Diabo na Terra do Sol	Glauber Rocha	Brazil
2011 (38th)	Caetano Veloso	Nordeste: Cordel, Repente E Canção (1975)		Tânia Quaresma	Brazil
2012 (39th)	Geoff Dyer	Stalker (1979)	Сталкер	Andrei Tarkovsky	Soviet Union
2012 (39th)	Geoff Dyer	Beau Travail (1999)		Claire Denis	France
2012 (39th)	Geoff Dyer	Together (2000)	Tillsammans	Lukas Moodysson	Sweden
2012 (39th)	Geoff Dyer	Lessons of Darkness (1992)	Lektionen in Finsternis	Werner Herzog	France, United Kingdom, Germany
2012 (39th)	Geoff Dyer	The Great Ecstasy of Woodcarver Steiner (1974)	Die große Ekstase des Bildschnitzers Steiner	Werner Herzog	Germany
2012 (39th)	Geoff Dyer	Baraka (1992)		Ron Fricke	United States
2012 (39th)	Geoff Dyer	Unrelated (2007)		Joanna Hogg	United Kingdom
2013 (40th)	Don DeLillo	La Morte Rouge (2006)		Víctor Erice	Spain
2013 (40th)	Don DeLillo	The Zapruder Film (1963)		Abraham Zapruder	United States
2013 (40th)	Phillip Lopate	Naked Childhood (1968)	L'enfance nue	Maurice Pialat	France
2013 (40th)	Buck Henry	The Terminal Man (1972)		Mike Hodges	United States
2013 (40th)	Michael Ondaatje	Elephant (1989)		Alan Clarke	United Kingdom
2013 (40th)	Michael Ondaatje	La Jetée (1962)		Chris Marker	France
2013 (40th)	B. Ruby Rich	One Way or Another (1974)	De Cierta Manera	Sara Gómez	Cuba
2013 (40th)	Salman Rushdie	Mahanagar (1963)		Satyajit Ray	India
2014 (41st)	Guy Maddin and Kim Morgan	California Split (1974)		Robert Altman	United States
2014 (41st)	Guy Maddin and Kim Morgan	M (1951)		Joseph Losey	United States
2014 (41st)	Guy Maddin and Kim Morgan	Man's Castle (1933)		Frank Borzage	United States
2014 (41st)	Guy Maddin and Kim Morgan	The Road to Glory (1936)		Howard Hawks	United States
2014 (41st)	Guy Maddin and Kim Morgan	Wicked Woman (1953)		Russell Rouse	United States
2014 (41st)	Guy Maddin and Kim Morgan	Il Grido (1957)		Michelangelo Antonioni	Italy
2015 (42nd)	Rachel Kushner	The Mother and the Whore (1973)	La maman et la putain	Jean Eustache	France
2015 (42nd)	Rachel Kushner	My Little Loves (1974)	Mes Petites Amoureuses	Jean Eustache	France
2015 (42nd)	Rachel Kushner	Wake in Fright (1971)		Ted Kotcheff	Australia
2015 (42nd)	Rachel Kushner	Cocksucker Blues (1979)		Robert Frank	United States
2015 (42nd)	Rachel Kushner	A Day In The Country (1936)	Partie de campagne	Jean Renoir	France
2015 (42nd)	Rachel Kushner	Uncle Yanco (1967)	Oncle Yanco	Agnès Varda	France
2015 (42nd)	Rachel Kushner	The Mattei Affair (1972)	Il Caso Mattei	Francesco Rosi	Italy
2016 (43rd)	Volker Schlöndorff	I Was Nineteen (!968)	Ich war neunzehn	Konrad Wolf	East Germany
2016 (43rd)	Volker Schlöndorff	It Was in May (1970)	Byl mesyats may	Marlen Khutsiev	Soviet Union
2016 (43rd)	Volker Schlöndorff	The Barefoot Contessa (1954)		Joseph L. Mankiewicz	United States
2016 (43rd)	Volker Schlöndorff	Les Enfants terribles (1950)		Jean-Pierre Melville	France
2016 (43rd)	Volker Schlöndorff	The Fire Within (1963)	Le Feu follet	Louis Malle	France
2016 (43rd)	Volker Schlöndorff	Spies (1928)	Spione	Fritz Lang	Germany
2017 (44th)	Joshua Oppenheimer	The Night of the Hunter (1955)		Charles Laughton	United States
2017 (44th)	Joshua Oppenheimer	Titicut Follies (1967)		Frederick Wiseman	United States
2017 (44th)	Joshua Oppenheimer	Hello Cinema (1995)	سلام سینما	Mohsen Makhmalbaf	Iran
2017 (44th)	Joshua Oppenheimer	Hotel of the Stars (1981)		Jon Bang Carlsen	Denmark
2017 (44th)	Joshua Oppenheimer	The Umbrellas of Cherbourg (1964)	Les Parapluies de Cherbourg	Jacques Demy	France
2017 (44th)	Joshua Oppenheimer	Even Dwarfs Started Small (1970)	Auch Zwerge haben klein angefangen	Werner Herzog	West Germany
2018 (45th)	Jonathan Lethem	Angel (1937)		Ernst Lubitsch	United States
2018 (45th)	Jonathan Lethem	Bigger Than Life (1956)		Nicholas Ray	United States
2018 (45th)	Jonathan Lethem	Never Cry Wolf (1983)		Carroll Ballard	United States
2018 (45th)	Jonathan Lethem	The Tarnished Angels (1957)		Douglas Sirk	United States
2018 (45th)	Jonathan Lethem	To Be or Not to Be (1942)		Ernst Lubitsch	United States
2018 (45th)	Jonathan Lethem	The White Meadows (2009)	کشتزارهای سپید	Mohammad Rasoulof	Iran
2019 (46th)	Pico Iyer	Late Autumn (1960)	秋日和	Yasujirō Ozu	Japan
2019 (46th)	Pico Iyer	When a Woman Ascends the Stairs (1960)	女が階段を上る時	Mikio Naruse	Japan
2019 (46th)	Pico Iyer	The Makioka Sisters (1983)	細雪	Kon Ichikawa	Japan
2019 (46th)	Pico Iyer	Mr. and Mrs. Iyer (2002)		Aparna Sen	India
2019 (46th)	Pico Iyer	Under the Sun (2015)	В лучах солнца	Vitaly Mansky	Russia, Czech Republic, Germany, Latvia, North Korea

=== 2020s ===
Year	Guest Director	English Title	Original Title	Director(s)	Production Country
2021 (48th)	Barry Jenkins	West Indies: The Fugitive Slaves of Liberty (1979)	West Indies ou les Nègres marrons de la liberté	Med Hondo	France, Mauritania, Algeria
2021 (48th)	Barry Jenkins	Chocolat (1988)		Claire Denis	France
2021 (48th)	Barry Jenkins	Looking for Langston (1989)		Isaac Julien	United Kingdom
2021 (48th)	Barry Jenkins	Garden (2003)	גן	Adi Barash	Israel
2021 (48th)	Barry Jenkins	Russian Ark (2002)	Русский ковчег	Alexander Sokurov	Russia
2021 (48th)	Barry Jenkins	Kahlil Joseph: Selected Works		Kahlil Joseph	United States
2022 (49th)	Kantemir Balagov and Kira Kovalenko	L'Atalante (1934)		Jean Vigo	France
2022 (49th)	Kantemir Balagov and Kira Kovalenko	Elegy of a Voyage (2001)	Элегия дороги	Alexander Sokurov	France, Russia, Netherlands
2022 (49th)	Kantemir Balagov and Kira Kovalenko	Getting to Know the Big, Wide World (1978)	Познавая белый свет	Kira Muratova	Soviet Union
2022 (49th)	Kantemir Balagov and Kira Kovalenko	Oasis (2002)	오아시스	Lee Chang-dong	South Korea
2022 (49th)	Kantemir Balagov and Kira Kovalenko	Where Is the Friend's House? (1987)	خانه دوست کجاست	Abbas Kiarostami	Iran
2022 (49th)	Kantemir Balagov and Kira Kovalenko	The Wonders (2014)	Le meraviglie	Alice Rohrwacher	Italy, Switzerland, Germany
2023 (50th)	Steve McQueen	Zero for Conduct (1933)	Zéro de Conduite	Jean Vigo	France
2023 (50th)	Mira Nair	The Music Room (1958)	Jalsaghar	Satyajit Ray	India
2023 (50th)	Alfonso Cuarón	Jonah Who Will Be 25 in the Year 2000 (1976)	Jonas qui aura 25 ans en l'an 2000	Alain Tanner	France-Switzerland
2023 (50th)	Rachel Kushner	Juvenile Court (1973)		Frederick Wiseman	United States
2023 (50th)	Ethan Hawke	All That Jazz (1979)		Bob Fosse	United States
2023 (50th)	Adam Curtis	The Long Good Friday (1980)		John Mackenzie	United Kingdom
2024 (51st)	Kenneth Lonergan	Arch of Triumph (1948)		Lewis Milestone	United States
2024 (51st)	Kenneth Lonergan	Barry Lyndon (1975)		Stanley Kubrick	United States, United Kingdom
2024 (51st)	Kenneth Lonergan	Doctor Zhivago (1965)		David Lean	United Kingdom, Italy, United States
2024 (51st)	Kenneth Lonergan	Grand Hotel (1932)		Edmund Goulding	United States
2024 (51st)	Kenneth Lonergan	My Darling Clementine (1946)		John Ford	United States
