= 48th Telluride Film Festival =

2021 film festival

- Location: Telluride, Colorado, United States
- Founded: 1974
- Awards: Telluride Film Festival Silver Medallion: Riz Ahmed; Jane Campion; Peter Dinklage
- Hosted by: National Film Preserve Ltd.
- Artistic director: Julie Huntsinger
- Festival date: September 2–6, 2021
- Website: telluridefilmfestival.org

Telluride Film Festival
- 49th 47th

The 48th Telluride Film Festival took place from September 2 to 6, 2021, in Telluride, Colorado.

After the cancellation of the previous year's event due to the COVID-19 pandemic in Colorado, the festival required proof of vaccination, a negative COVID-19 test within 72 hours and masks worn indoors to prevent the spread of COVID-19.

American filmmaker Barry Jenkins, who previously annually has curated the festival's Calling Cards and Great Expectations programs, was chosen as the edition's guest director, and selected six classic films for a parallel section.

The Telluride Film Festival Silver Medallion was presented to British-Pakistani actor Riz Ahmed, New Zealand filmmaker Jane Campion, and American actor Peter Dinklage. American film historian Annette Insdorf received the Special Medallion award.

Luke Dorman, Meow Wolf's lead graphic designer, was chosen as the creative behind the edition's poster.

== Official selection ==
The official line-up was announced, as usual, on the day before the festival's official opening.

=== Main Program ===
The following films were selected to be screened:

English Title	Original Title	Director(s)	Production Country
The Apaches of Athens (1930)	Οι Απάχηδες των Αθηνών	Dimitris Gaziadis	Greece
The Automat		Lisa Hurwitz	United States
Becoming Cousteau		Liz Garbus	United States
Belfast		Kenneth Branagh	United Kingdom, United States
Bergman Island		Mia Hansen-Løve	France, Mexico, Brazil, Germany, Sweden
Bitterbrush		Emelie Mahdavian	United States
C'mon C'mon		Mike Mills	United States
Citizen Ashe		Sam Pollard	United States, United Kingdom
Cow		Andrea Arnold	United Kingdom
Cyrano		Joe Wright	United Kingdom, Canada, United States
The Duke		Roger Michell	United Kingdom
The Electrical Life of Louis Wain		Will Sharpe	France, United Kingdom, United States
Encounter		Michael Pearce	United Kingdom, United States
Fauci		John Hoffman and Janet Tobias	United States
Flee	Flugt	Jonas Poher Rasmussen	Denmark, France, Norway, Sweden, United Kingdom, United States
Fragment of an Empire (1929)	Обломок империи	Fridrikh Ermler	Soviet Union
Hallelujah: Leonard Cohen, A Journey, A Song		Dayna Goldfine and Dan Geller	United States, Canada
The Hand of God	È stata la mano di Dio	Paolo Sorrentino	Italy
A Hero	قهرمان	Asghar Farhadi	Iran, France
Julia		Julie Cohen and Betsy West	United States
King Richard		Reinaldo Marcus Green	United States
The Lost Daughter		Maggie Gyllenhaal	Greece, United States, United Kingdom, Israel
Marcel the Shell with Shoes On		Dean Fleischer Camp	United States
Muhammad Ali		Ken Burns	United States
Nuclear Family		Ry Russo-Young	United States
Petite Maman		Céline Sciamma	France
The Power of the Dog		Jane Campion	New Zealand, Australia, United Kingdom, United States, Canada
Procession		Robert Greene	United States
The Real Charlie Chaplin		James Spinney and Peter Middleton	United States
Red Rocket		Sean Baker	United States
The Rescue		Elizabeth Chai Vasarhelyi and Jimmy Chin	United States, United Kingdom
River		Jennifer Peedom and Joseph Nizeti	Australia
The Same Storm		Peter Hedges	United States
Speer Goes to Hollywood	שפאר בדרך להוליווד	Vanessa Lapa	Israel, Austria, Germany
Spencer		Pablo Larraín	United Kingdom, United States, Germany, Chile
Torn		Max Lowe	United States
Unclenching the Fists	Разжимая кулаки	Kira Kovalenko	Russia
The Velvet Underground		Todd Haynes	United States

=== Guest Director's Selections ===
The following films were selected and presented by the year's guest director, Barry Jenkins:

English Title	Original Title	Director(s)	Production Country
Chocolat (1988)		Claire Denis	France, Cameroon
Garden (2003)	גן	Ruthie Shatz and Adi Barash	Israel
Kahlil Joseph: Selected Works			United States
Looking for Langston (1989)		Isaac Julien	United Kingdom
Russian Ark (2002)	Русский ковчег	Alexander Sokurov	Russia, Germany, Canada, Finland, Denmark
West Indies: The Fugitive Slaves of Liberty (1979)	West Indies ou les Nègres marrons de la liberté	Med Hondo	France, Mauritania, Algeria

=== Filmmakers of Tomorrow ===
==== Student Prints ====
The selection was curated and introduced by Gregory Nava. It selected the best student-produced work around the world.

Title	Director(s)	Universitie(s)
Bad Omen	Salar Pashtoonyar	York University
Bitch	Bertille Estramon	Institut des Arts de Diffusion
Close Ties to Home Country	Akanksha Cruczynski	Columbia College Chicago
Lakutshon' ilanga (When the Sun Sets)	Phumi Morare	Chapman University
Love, Dad	Diana Cam Van Nguyen	Film and TV School of the Academy of Performing Arts in Prague
No es ella (It's Not Her)	Samuel González Vera	Escuela Internacional de Cine y Televisión
Soft Animals	Renee Zhan	National Film and Television School
Spaces	Nora Štrbová	Film and TV School of the Academy of Performing Arts in Prague

==== Calling Cards ====
The selection was curated by Barry Jenkins, and selected new works from promising filmmakers.

English Title	Original Title	Director(s)	Production Country
I Am Afraid to Forget Your Face	ستاشر	Sameh Alaa	Egypt, France, Qatar, Belgium
Motorcyclist's Happiness Won't Fit Into His Suit	Al motociclista no le cabe la felicidad en le traje	Gabriel Herrera	Mexico
Play It Safe		Mitch Kalisa	United Kingdom
Sideral		Carlos Segundo	Brazil, France
Spirits and Rocks: An Azorean Myth	Espiritos e Rochas: um Mito Açoriano	Aylin Gökmen	Switzerland, Portugal
What Remains	O Que Resta	Daniel Soares	Portugal

==== Great Expectations ====
The selection was curated by Barry Jenkins. The following films were selected to be screened:

Title	Director(s)	Production Country
Easter Eggs	Nicolas Keppens	Belgium, France, Netherlands
My Own Landscapes	Antoine Chapon	France
Noir-Soleil	Marie Larrivé	France
Terra Incognita	Pernille Kjaer and Adrian Dexter	Denmark
The Vandal	Eddie Alcazar	United States

=== Backlot ===
The selection included behind-the-scene movies and portraits of artists, musicians, and filmmakers. The following films were selected to be screened:

Title	Director(s)	Production countrie(s)
Andrei Tarkovsky: A Cinema Prayer	Andrei Tarkovsky	Italy, Russia, Sweden
Bernstein's Wall	Douglas Tirola	United States
Dark Frames	Tom Thurman	United States
Edna	Eryk Rocha	Brazil
Joyce Carol Oates: A Body in the Service of Mind	Stig Björkman	Sweden
Land of Gold	Jon Else	United States
Songs for Drella	Ed Lachman	United States
Stay Prayed Up	D.L. Anderson and Matt Durning	United States
The Story of Looking	Mark Cousins	United Kingdom
Three Minutes – A Lengthening	Bianca Stigter	Netherlands, United Kingdom
The Village Detective: A Song Cycle	Bill Morrison	United States

== Official Awards ==
- Silver Medallion:
  - Riz Ahmed
  - Jane Campion
  - Peter Dinklage
- Special Medallion: Annette Insdorf
