= 41st Telluride Film Festival =

2014 film festival

- Location: Telluride, Colorado, United States
- Founded: 1974
- Awards: Telluride Film Festival Silver Medallion: Volker Schlöndorff; Hilary Swank; Apocalypse Now
- Hosted by: National Film Preserve Ltd.
- Festival date: August 29 – September 1, 2014
- Website: https://telluridefilmfestival.org/

Telluride Film Festival
- 42nd 40th

The 41st Telluride Film Festival took place from August 29 to September 1, 2014, in Telluride, Colorado.

Canadian filmmakers Guy Maddin and Kim Morgan were chosen as the edition's guest director, and selected six classic films for a parallel section.

The Telluride Film Festival Silver Medallion was presented to German filmmaker Volker Schlöndorff, American actress Hilary Swank and feature film Apocalypse Now. Special Medallion was awarded to film archive Cineteca di Bologna and its head Gian Luca Farinelli.

== Official selections ==
The official line-up was announced, as usual, on the day before the festival's official opening, on August 28, 2014.

=== Main Program ===
The following films were selected to be screened:

| English Title | Original Title | Director(s) | Production Country |
|---|---|---|---|
| The 50 Year Argument | | Martin Scorsese and David Tedeschi | United Kingdom, United States |
| '71 | | Yann Demange | United Kingdom |
| 99 Homes | | Ramin Bahrani | United States |
| Birdman | | Alejandro González Iñárritu | United States |
| A Borrowed Identity | العرب الراقصون / זהות שאולה | Eran Riklis | Israel, Germany, France |
| The Decent One | Der Anständige | Vanessa Lapa | Israel, Austria, Germany |
| Diplomacy | Diplomatie | Volker Schlöndorff | France, Germany |
| Foxcatcher | | Bennett Miller | United States |
| The Gate | Le Temps des aveux | Régis Wargnier | France, Belgium, Cambodia |
| The Homesman | | Tommy Lee Jones | United States |
| The Imitation Game | | Morten Tyldum | United Kingdom, United States |
| Leviathan | Левиафан | Andrey Zvyagintsev | Russia |
| The Look of Silence | Senyap | Joshua Oppenheimer | Denmark, Indonesia, Norway, Finland, United States |
| Madame Bovary | | Sophie Barthes | United Kingdom, Belgium |
| Merchants of Doubt | | Robert Kenner | United States |
| Mommy | | Xavier Dolan | Canada |
| Mr. Turner | | Mike Leigh | United Kingdom, France, Germany |
| The Price of Fame | La Rançon de la gloire | Xavier Beauvois | France |
| Red Army | | Gabe Polsky | United States, Russia |
| Rosewater | | Jon Stewart | United States |
| The Salt of the Earth | Le sel de la terre | Wim Wenders and Juliano Ribeiro Salgado | France, Brazil, Italy |
| Tales of the Grim Sleeper | | Nick Broomfield | United Kingdom, United States |
| Two Days, One Night | Deux jours, une nuit | Jean-Pierre and Luc Dardenne | Belgium, Italy, France |
| Wild | | Jean-Marc Vallée | United States |
| Wild Tales | Relatos salvajes | Damián Szifron | Argentina, Spain |

=== Guest Directors' Selections ===
The films were screened in archival 35 mm prints and selected by the year's guest directors Guy Maddin and Kim Morgan. The following films were selected to be screened:

| Title | Director(s) | Production Country |
|---|---|---|
| California Split (1974) | Robert Altman | United States |
| Il Grido (1957) | Michelangelo Antonioni | Italy |
| M (1951) | Joseph Losey | United States |
| Man's Castle (1933) | Frank Borzage | United States |
| The Road to Glory (1936) | Howard Hawks | United States |
| Wicked Woman (1953) | Russell Rouse | United States |

=== Filmmakers of Tomorrow ===
==== Student Prints ====
The selection was curated and introduced by Gregory Nava. It selected the best student-produced work around the world. The following films were selected to be screened:

| Title | Director(s) | Production Country/Universitie(s) |
|---|---|---|
| First Prize | Kevin McMullin | United States (Columbia University) |
| Guests | Mark Columbus | United States (University of California, Los Angeles) |
| No Man's Land | David Adler | Denmark (National Film School of Denmark) |
| Nocebo | Lennart Ruff | Germany (Munich Film School) |
| The Pride of Strathmoor | Einar Baltin | United States (University of Southern California) |
| Stone Cars | Reinaldo Marcus Green | United States, South Africa (New York University) |

==== Calling Cards ====
The selection was curated by Jonathan Marlow. It selected new works from promising filmmakers. The following films were selected to be screened:

| Title | Director(s) | Production Country |
|---|---|---|
| Cut | Matthias Müller and Christoph Girardet | Germany |
| Discussion Questions | Jonn Herschend | United States |
| En plein air | Jerzy Rose | United States |
| Ja vi esker | Hallvar Witzø | Norway |
| The Sand Storm | Jason Wishnow | China, United States |
| Symphony No. 42 | Réka Bucsi | Hungary |
| Theoretical Architectures | Josh Gibson | United States |
| Washingtonia | Konstantina Kotzamani | Greece |

==== Great Expectations ====
The selection was curated by Jonathan Marlow. The following films were selected to be screened:

| Title | Director(s) | Production Country |
|---|---|---|
| Ballkoni | Lendita Zeqiraj | Kosovo |
| Dive | Matthew J. Saville | New Zealand |
| La Isla | Dominga Sotomayor Castillo and Katarzyna Klimkiewicz | Chile, Poland |
| L'assenza | Jonathan Romney | United Kingdom |
