= Greg Yuna =

American jeweler

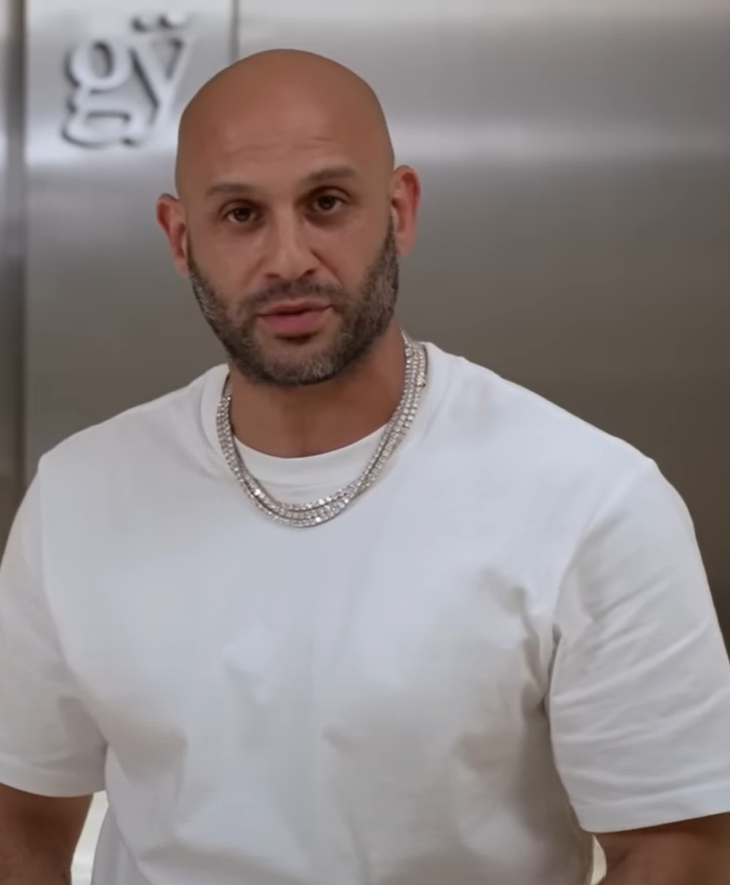
- Yuna in 2024
- Born: June 28, 1982 (age 43); Queens, New York
- Occupation: Jeweler
- Website: www.gregyuna.com

Greg Yuna is an American jeweler.

== Biography ==
He was born and raised in Queens. In 2009, he joined the family jewelry business and in 2017, he began his own company, Chapter II, also located in the Diamond District. Yuna is known for his Instagram posts shot in the middle of 6th Avenue in Manhattan during a 51-second red traffic light, often involving celebrities wearing his jewelry.

Yuna's designs have been worn by clients including Floyd Mayweather, Meek Mill, and Victor Cruz. He designed Ariana Grande's engagement ring. He also created a pendant picturing the late rapper Nipsey Hussle for Hussle's longtime girlfriend, Lauren London. Yuna has designed sneaker pendants for Nike.

In 2019, Yuna was an advisor for and had a minor role in the 2019 Adam Sandler film Uncut Gems. He appeared on an episode of Ridiculousness in 2021.
