= Little Hands (2017 film) =

2017 film

- Directed by: Rémi Allier
- Written by: Rémi Allier; Julien Guetta; Gilles Monnat
- Produced by: Benoit Roland (producer); Pauline Seigland (co-producer); Lionel Massol (co-producer)
- Starring: Emile Moulron Lejeune; Jan Hammenecker; Steve Driesen; Sandrine Blancke
- Edited by: Nicolas Bier
- Music by: Leo Dupleix
- Distributed by: Salaud Morisset
- Release date: 2017
- Running time: 15mn
- Countries: France; Belgium

Little Hands (Original title (FR): Les Petites Mains) is a Live Action short film directed by Rémi Allier and produced by Wrong Men & Films Grand Huit, winner of the César Award for Best Short Film at the French Motion Picture César Academy. The short film has been presented and won awards in a number of festivals including Brussels Short Film Festival and the Magritte Award where it was nominated for "Best Short Film" (Meilleur court métrage).

== Plot ==
Upon discovering that the management is closing down the factory, a desperate employee kidnaps the toddler of the director in order to negotiate.

== Awards ==
Since its launch, the film has received numerous awards, and selected in more than 150 festivals around the world.

Year	Presenter/Festival	Award/Category	Status
2017	THESS International Short Film Festival	"Best Director" - for Les Petites Mains	Won
2018	Telluride Film Festival	"Best Short Film"	Nominated
2018	Minneapolis–Saint Paul International Film Festival	"Best Short Film"	Nominated
2018	Magritte Awards	"Best Short Film (Meilleur court métrage)"	Nominated
2018	Odense International Film Festival	"Main Competition"	Nominated
2019	Académie des Arts et Techniques du Cinéma	César Award for Best Short Film	Won.
2019	Flickerfest International Short Film Festival	"Best Film"	Nominated
2019	Brussels Short Film Festival	"International Competition"	Won
2019	MyFrenchFilmFestival	"Short Film Competition"	Nominated

The short was part of the Oscar predictive world touring screening The animation Showcase 2019 (Live Action Screenings).
