= Viva (2015 film) =

2015 Irish-Cuban film

- Irish theatrical release poster
- Directed by: Paddy Breathnach
- Written by: Mark O'Halloran
- Produced by: Cathleen Dore; Nelson Navarro Navarro; Rebecca O'Flanagan; Robert Walpole
- Starring: Héctor Medina; Jorge Perugorría; Luis Alberto García; Jorge Martinez
- Cinematography: Cathal Watters
- Edited by: Stephen O'Connell
- Music by: Stephen Rennicks
- Production companies: Treasure Entertainment; RTÉ; Windmill Lane Pictures; Island Film
- Release dates: 4 September 2015 (Telluride); 19 August 2016 (Ireland)
- Running time: 100 minutes
- Countries: Ireland; Cuba
- Language: Spanish
- Box office: $423,976

Viva is a 2015 drama film directed by Paddy Breathnach and written by Mark O'Halloran. Set in Havana, it follows Jesus (Héctor Medina), a young drag queen performer who, after reuniting with his estranged father, must come to terms with his sexuality.

The film had its world premiere at the 42nd Telluride Film Festival, on 4 September 2015, and was theatrically released in Ireland on 19 August 2016. It received positive reviews.

It was selected as the Irish entry for the Best Foreign Language Film at the 88th Academy Awards. It made the December shortlist of nine films, but was not nominated.

== Plot ==
Aspiring dancer, Jesus, does makeup for a production of drag performers in Havana but dreams of performing. Taking his opportunity to be onstage, a stranger from the crowd, who happens to be his estranged former boxer father, Angel, punches him in the face. The father and son clash over their opposite personal values, while they struggle to understand each other and become united as a whole family.

== Cast ==
- Héctor Medina as Jesus
- Jorge Perugorría as Angel
- Luis Alberto García as Mama
- Jorge Martinez as Celeste
- Luis Manuel Alvarez as Cindy
- Maikel “Renata” Machin Blanco as Pamela
- Laura Alemán as Cecilia
- Paula Ali as Nita
- Luis Angel Batista as Don
- Luis Daniel Ventura as Kali
- Maikol Villa Puey as William
- Oscar Ibarra as Javier
- Libia Batista as Lazara
- Tomas Cao as Nestor
- Jorge Acosta as Lydia
- Mark O'Halloran as Ray

== Production ==
An Irish-Cuban co-production, it marks Breathnach's first Spanish language feature film. The film reflects the slow process of acceptance towards LGBTQ rights in Cuba, which since 2008 officially recognized gender identity rights, and a few years after the film's release (2019), officially passed constitutional protections for sexual orientation and gender identity.

Principal photography took place on location in Havana, in just 22 days with a small budget. The production received legal authorization from the Cuban government.

== Release ==
Magnolia Pictures acquired distribution rights for the U.S., and received a limited release in early 2016.

== See also ==
- List of submissions to the 88th Academy Awards for Best Foreign Language Film
- List of Irish submissions for the Academy Award for Best Foreign Language Film
