= Uncut Gems =

2019 film by the Safdie brothers

- Theatrical release poster
- Directed by: Josh Safdie; Benny Safdie
- Written by: Ronald Bronstein; Josh Safdie; Benny Safdie
- Produced by: Scott Rudin; Eli Bush; Sebastian Bear-McClard
- Starring: Adam Sandler; LaKeith Stanfield; Julia Fox; Kevin Garnett; Idina Menzel; Eric Bogosian
- Cinematography: Darius Khondji
- Edited by: Ronald Bronstein; Benny Safdie
- Music by: Daniel Lopatin
- Production companies: A24; Elara Pictures; Sikelia Productions; Scott Rudin Productions; IAC Films
- Distributed by: A24 (United States); Netflix (International)
- Release dates: August 30, 2019 (Telluride); December 13, 2019 (United States)
- Running time: 135 minutes
- Country: United States
- Language: English
- Budget: $19 million
- Box office: $50 million

Uncut Gems is a 2019 American crime thriller film directed by Josh and Benny Safdie, who wrote it with Ronald Bronstein. It stars Adam Sandler, LaKeith Stanfield, Julia Fox, Kevin Garnett, Idina Menzel, and The Weeknd in his debut role. Sandler plays Howard Ratner, a jeweler and gambling addict who must retrieve an opal to pay off his debt. Filming took place from September to November 2018. Daniel Lopatin composed the score.

Uncut Gems premiered at the 46th Telluride Film Festival on August 30, 2019. A24 gave it a limited release in the United States on December 13 and a wide release on December 25, with Netflix releasing it in other territories. It was a box-office success and received acclaim, especially for Sandler's against-type performance, which several reviewers called the best of his career. Uncut Gems has been included in lists of the greatest films of the 21st century.

== Plot ==
In 2010, Ethiopian Jewish miners retrieve a rare black opal from the Welo mine in Ethiopia.

In 2012, gambling addict Howard Ratner runs KMH, a jewelry store in New York City's Diamond District. He struggles to pay off his gambling debts, which include a $100,000 loan he owes to Arno, his loan shark brother-in-law. His domestic life is split between his wife Dinah, who has agreed to divorce after Passover, and his girlfriend Julia, a KMH employee.

Howard's business associate, Demany, brings the basketball star Kevin Garnett to KMH. While he is there, the opal, which Howard had smuggled from Africa, arrives. Garnett becomes obsessed with the opal and insists on borrowing it as a good-luck talisman for his game that night. Howard reluctantly agrees, accepting Garnett's 2008 NBA Championship ring as collateral.

After Garnett leaves, Howard pawns the ring and wins a six-way parlay on Garnett playing extraordinarily well in that night's game. The next day, Demany says that Garnett still has the opal, angering Howard. Howard is ambushed at his daughter's school play by Arno and his goons, Phil and Nico. Howard's winning bet should have earned him $600,000, but Arno reveals that he placed a stop on the bet because it was made with money Howard owed him. Phil and Nico strip Howard naked and lock him in the trunk of his car, forcing him to call Dinah for help.

Howard meets Demany at a nightclub party hosted by the singer the Weeknd to retrieve the opal, but learns that Garnett still has it. Howard discovers Julia snorting cocaine in a bathroom with the Weeknd and gets into a fight with him. Feeling betrayed, Howard confronts Julia and demands that she move out of his apartment.

Garnett returns the opal before an auction and offers to purchase it for $175,000, but Howard refuses, believing it is worth much more. Garnett demands his ring back, but Howard lies, saying it is at his house. After Garnett leaves in dismay, Howard berates Demany for allowing Garnett to hold onto the opal for so long. Incensed, Demany quits and trashes Howard's office. After an awkward Passover dinner, Dinah rejects Howard's plea to give their marriage another chance.

Just before the auction starts, Howard discovers the opal has been appraised for significantly less than his initial estimate of $1 million. He convinces his father-in-law, Gooey, to bid on the gem to drive up the price, but the plan backfires when Garnett fails to top Gooey's final bid. A furious Gooey gives Howard the opal before Arno, Phil, and Nico assault Howard outside the auction house. Howard returns to KMH, bloody and in tears. Julia comforts him, and they reconcile.

Howard learns that Garnett is still willing to purchase the opal. Garnett goes to KMH to pay, giving Howard enough money to repay his debt to Arno. Arno, Phil, and Nico arrive at KMH just before Garnett leaves, but before they enter his office, Howard tells Julia to bet the cash on a three-way parlay on Garnett's performance. Julia escapes as the thugs find Howard in his office and threaten him, while Julia travels by helicopter to the Mohegan Sun casino to place the bet. Arno tells Howard to call Julia and cancel the bet, but he refuses. Furious, the three attempt to pursue her, but Howard locks them between the store's security doors as the game concludes on television.

Garnett's Boston Celtics win the game, winning Howard $1.2 million. An ecstatic Howard frees Arno, Phil, and Nico, but Phil, enraged, shoots and kills him. Arno protests and tries to escape, but Phil kills him. Julia leaves the casino with Howard's winnings as Phil and Nico loot the store.

== Cast ==
- Adam Sandler as Howard Ratner, a jeweler and gambling addict
- LaKeith Stanfield as Demany, an intermediary who recruits clients for Howard
- Julia Fox as Julia De Fiore, Howard's employee and mistress
- Kevin Garnett as a fictionalized version of himself during his years with the Boston Celtics
- Idina Menzel as Dinah Ratner, Howard's wife
- Eric Bogosian as Arno Moradian, a loan shark married to Dinah's sister
- Judd Hirsch as Gooey, Howard's father-in-law
- Keith William Richards as Phil, Arno's quick-tempered lead goon
- Mike Francesa as Gary, Howard's bookie
- Jonathan Aranbayev as Eddie Ratner, Howard's elder son
- Noa Fisher as Marcel Ratner, Howard's daughter
- The Weeknd as himself
- Tommy Kominik as Nico, one of Arno's goons
- Maksud Agadjani as Yussi, Howard's employee
- Andrea Linsky as Joani, Howard's employee
- Roman Persits as Roman, the bench jeweler at Howard's shop
- Arthur Borukhov as Elan, Howard's employee
- Ronald Greenberg as Rodney Bronstein, a pawnbroker
- Marshall Greenberg as Steve Bronstein, a pawnbroker
- Jacob Igielski as Beni Ratner, Howard's younger son
- Hailey Gates as the receptionist at Adley's auction house
- Mitchell Wenig as Larry, one of Howard's creditors
- Keren Shemel as Eiline Goldfarb, the mother of one of Marcel's classmates
- Aren Topian as Eric Goldfarb, the father of one of Marcel's classmates
- Louis Anthony Arias as Buddy, one of Arno's goons
- Anthony Mecca as Michael, one of Arno's goons
- Jake Ryan as "Dwarf 2"
- Greg "Mr. Flawless" Yuna as a fictionalized version of himself, a jeweler to celebrities
- Benjy Kleiner as Aaron, Dinah's brother
- Josh Ostrovsky as Noah, Dinah's cousin
- Alexander Gilkes as the Adley's auctioneer
- Wayne Diamond as the High Roller (a fictionalized version of himself), a fashion designer and gambler

John Amos, Ca$h Out, and Trinidad James appear as themselves, Amos as Howard's neighbor and the others as acquaintances of Demany. Tilda Swinton and Natasha Lyonne have vocal cameos as the auction manager and a Celtics staff member, respectively. and Matthew Sabia cameos as himself playing a nightclub promoter. Celtics head coach Doc Rivers wrote and delivered a voiceover pep talk for the film. Pom Klementieff has a brief cameo as Lexis, a friend of Julia who greets Howard outside his Manhattan apartment during the opening credits.

== Production ==
=== Concept and screenplay ===
Josh and Benny Safdie came up with the idea of a Diamond District movie in 2009, influenced by their father's stories of working as a diamond salesman. Co-writer Ronald Bronstein came from a similar background, as his father worked in the Garment District. Their shared Jewish upbringing was essential to their crafting of the film. The Safdies have said that "the film is about belonging" but also "about cheating God". Slate called it "the most Jewish movie in years". IndieWire's David Ehrlich wrote, "Uncut Gems is the movie that Jews were promised in the Torah. Uncut Gems is gonna be the theme of my son's bar mitzvah."

The question that everyone had about this movie before it even came out is whether it's antisemitic to make a movie about a crooked Jewish diamond dealer. The assumption built into that question is that the diamond dealer is a symbol of the wealthy Jew. But what we see in this movie is that he's a symbol of the working-class Jew, the desperate Jew. Maybe he's not meaningfully working-class in terms of his place in the American economy, but he is culturally marked as working-class, and that is what's actually embarrassing about it.

— Ari Brostoff

When creating the character of Howard, the Safdies were heavily influenced by Jewish humor and actors from the 20th century. Howard has been likened to a schlimazel, a stock Jewish humor character marked by his poor luck, or a schlemiel, marked by his ineptitude and clumsiness, though The Village Voice's J. Hoberman argued that Howard's shamelessness precludes the latter comparison. The Safdies said they wanted Howard to encompass Jewish stereotypes proudly and treat them as a "superpower", saying, "it was very important to make Howard a strong guy who doesn't back down." Josh Safdie said that one of his goals was to prove "that people can look beyond a flaw. ... That's why the movie is called 'Uncut Gems.' Uncut gems are rough things that are considered ugly by most people, but when you scope them out and get underneath you can find the beauty and value in them."

The Jewish concept of "learning through suffering" was also important for the character. In a round-table hosted by Jewish Currents, David Klion said, "the overriding effect that the movie seems to have on virtually everyone who sees it is one of intense anxiety, which feels like a very Jewish theme." Arielle Angel wrote that Howard embodies a combination of "insecurity plus power" and that his Jewishness makes him "white enough to have access" while leaving him "with this immigrant hustler mentality".

The Safdies designed Howard to channel Jewish "stereotypes that were forced onto us in the Middle Ages, when ... our only way of accruing status as an individual, as a person who was considered a human being, was through material consumption." Production designer Sam Lisenco worked with the Safdies to depict a new-money striver who, despite his wealth, retains the trashy tastes of his childhood. Lisenco noted that Howard buys expensive but dated items he could not afford when he was younger, like the Sony Trinitron television in his Manhattan apartment, floor-to-ceiling mirrors, and large fish tanks. The Ringer's Katie Baker called the overall effect "a study in tacky midtownish entropy".

=== Development ===
In May 2016, it was announced that the Safdies would direct the film from a screenplay they wrote with Bronstein, and that the Safdies' company Elara Pictures and RT Features would produce, with Emma Tillinger Koskoff and Martin Scorsese as executive producers. In May 2017, the Safdies announced that Scott Rudin, Eli Bush, and Sebastian Bear-McClard would produce the film, and A24 would distribute it. Netflix acquired the international distribution rights.

=== Casting ===
The Safdies initially approached Adam Sandler to star in 2010 and 2015, but his manager rejected the script. Once Scorsese agreed to executive-produce, actors started taking the film more seriously. Jonah Hill was cast as Howard in May 2017, and the Safdies tried to rewrite the character to be younger, but Hill dropped out due to scheduling problems and chose to direct Mid90s. In April 2018, Sandler agreed to play Howard after watching the Safdies' film Good Time. Other actors considered for the role included Sacha Baron Cohen, Harvey Keitel, and James Caan (around 2011).

Eric Bogosian, Judd Hirsch, Lakeith Stanfield, and Idina Menzel joined the project in August and September 2018. Tom Sizemore, Jerry Ferrara, John David Washington, and Isla Fisher read for those parts at a table-read during development. Three hundred actresses auditioned for the role of Julia, and the names of Lady Gaga, Jennifer Lawrence, Scarlett Johansson, and Kim Kardashian were thrown around; but the role eventually went to Julia Fox. Riley Keough also read for the part at a table-read during development.

For the role of the basketball player, Kevin Garnett was cast in September 2018. Kobe Bryant, Amar'e Stoudemire, and Joel Embiid were also considered. The Safdies originally wrote the part with Bryant in mind, and planned to focus on the day that Bryant broke the Madison Square Garden single-game scoring record, but Bryant's agent said Bryant was interested only in directing. The Safdies were drawn to Stoudemire due to his joint black and Jewish heritage, as well as his years with the New York Knicks, the Safdies' favorite team. (Josh Safdie said, "There's a strong correlation with Judaism and Knicks basketball ... it has to do with suffering and trying to understand your life.") But Stoudemire refused to shave his head to mirror his Knicks-era look. Embiid initially agreed to join, but was forced to drop out when the Safdies moved filming to the basketball season. The Safdies began to look at retired players and settled on Garnett, even though Garnett's Celtics and the Knicks have a historic rivalry.

In October 2018, it was revealed that the Weeknd, Trinidad James, and Pom Klementieff had joined the cast. The Weeknd specifically requested to play the role as an egotistical punk, saying that was how he treated people in 2012. Klementieff's scenes, apart from a brief cameo during the opening credits, were cut.

=== Filming ===
Principal photography began on September 25, 2018, in New York City, and concluded on November 15. The film was shot by Darius Khondji, primarily on 35 mm film, using vintage anamorphic prime and long zoom lenses. Night sequences were filmed using the Arri Alexa Mini camera outfitted with the same pairing of lens types. O'Kiep, South Africa doubled as the Welo mine in Ethiopia, but Ethiopians were cast as extras. For verisimilitude, the filmmakers borrowed real footage from Garnett's NBA games, assuming that it qualified as fair use. The opening and closing sequences were inspired by the gemological photomicrography of Eduard Gübelin and Danny J. Sanchez.

=== Music ===
Daniel Lopatin composed the original score. He also recorded several songs with the Weeknd for the film. They were not used, but he has production credits on the Weeknd's 2020 album After Hours. A soundtrack album was released on December 13, 2019, on CD, vinyl, and digital streaming services.

== Release ==
Uncut Gems had its world premiere at the 46th Telluride Film Festival on August 30, 2019. It screened at the 2019 Toronto International Film Festival on September 9 and at the 57th New York Film Festival on October 12. It received a limited theatrical release in the United States on December 13 before its nationwide release on December 25. The film was released internationally on Netflix on January 31, 2020, and began streaming on the service in the U.S. on May 25.

The Criterion Collection acquired the rights to distribute the film on home video, and issued a DVD in 2021. The Safdies rented and ripped Criterion discs from Netflix growing up; Josh Safdie said that being acquired by Criterion felt like sneaking into a museum.

== Reception ==
=== Box office ===
The first weekend of its limited release, Uncut Gems made $537,242 at five theaters; its per-venue average of $107,448 was the highest ever for A24 and the second-best of any film released in 2019. It made $241,431 its second weekend in theaters.

Uncut Gems made $5.9 million on the first day of its wide release (including $1.1 million from previews on Christmas Eve), the highest single-day gross in A24 history. It made $18.5 million over the five-day holiday weekend ($9.6 million of that during the weekend proper), finishing sixth at the box office. In its second weekend of wide release, it made $7.5 million, finishing eighth at the box office. By the end of its theatrical run, it had earned $50 million and was A24's highest-grossing film domestically until it was surpassed by Everything Everywhere All at Once in 2022.

=== Critical response ===
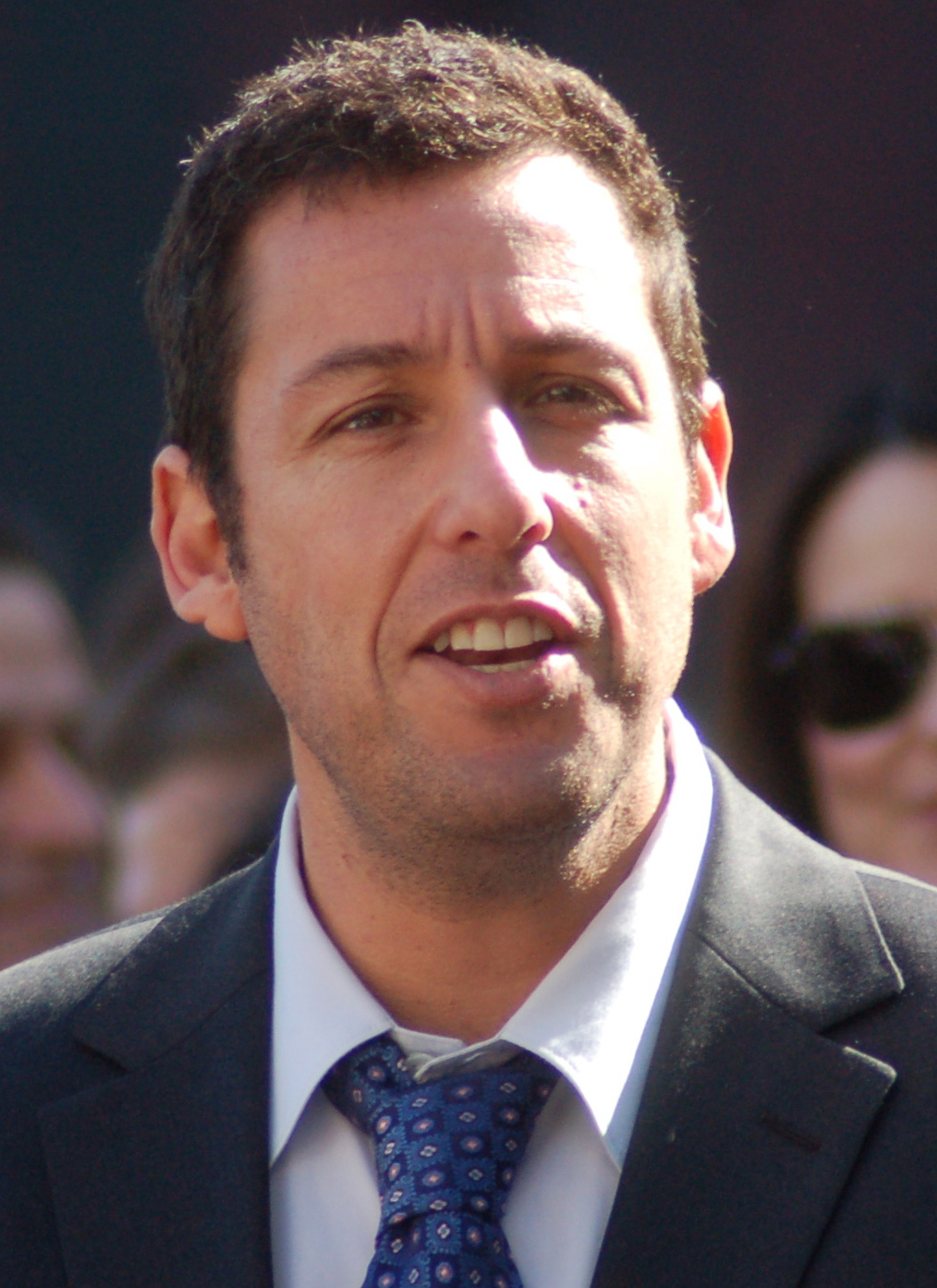
Adam Sandler's performance garnered critical acclaim, with several critics deeming it the best of his career.

On Rotten Tomatoes, the film has an approval rating of 91% based on 351 reviews, with an average score of 8.4/10; the site's "critics consensus" reads: "Uncut Gems reaffirms the Safdies as masters of anxiety-inducing cinema—and proves Adam Sandler remains a formidable dramatic actor when given the right material." On Metacritic, it has a weighted average score of 93 out of 100 based on reviews by 56 critics, indicating "universal acclaim". Audiences polled by CinemaScore during the limited release gave it an average grade of "A−" on an A+ to F scale. Following the wide release, CinemaScore re-polled audiences and its score declined to "C+", and Uncut Gems received an average score of 2 out of 5 stars on PostTrak.

Sandler's performance received acclaim, with some commentators calling it the best of his career. Todd McCarthy of The Hollywood Reporter wrote, "Many will agree that this is Sandler's best performance, and the Safdies will finally move from the fringes of the commercial film scene to somewhere closer to the center." Some considered Sandler a possible Academy Award for Best Actor nominee. On The Howard Stern Show, he joked that if he did not win an Oscar, he would make the "worst movie ever ... so bad on purpose just to make you all pay." After learning that he had not been nominated, he congratulated Kathy Bates—his co-star in The Waterboy (1998)—on her Best Supporting Actress nomination, and joked that he finally "can stop wearing suits".

Eric Kohn of IndieWire gave Uncut Gems a grade of "A", calling it "a riveting high-wire act, pairing cosmic visuals with the gritty energy of a dark psychological thriller and sudden bursts of frantic comedy". Jake Cole of Slant Magazine gave it 3.5 out of 4 stars, writing: "As in Good Time, Uncut Gems finds the Safdies working in a genre rooted in the grimy, character-oriented crime films of the '70s." Radheyan Simonpillai of Now wrote, "there's so much propulsive, forward momentum even when the characters never get anywhere." In her roundup of the 2019 Toronto International Film Festival, Wendy Ide of The Guardian ranked Uncut Gems one of the best films of the year, calling it "Audacious, thrilling and exhausting" and Sandler's "remarkable performance" one of the best of the year, and praising the cinematography.

Justin Chang of the Los Angeles Times wrote: "Directed with relentless tension and diamond-hard intelligence by Josh and Benny Safdie (who earlier this month won directing honors from the New York Film Critics Circle), Uncut Gems is a thriller and a character study, a tragedy and a blast." Peter Bradshaw of The Guardian called it "a cinema of pure energy and grungy voltage, and the Safdies make it look very easy. This will be the year's most exciting film."

The soundtrack and sound editing were acclaimed. Jon Caramanica of the New York Times wrote: "there is no opportunity for sonic escape in 'Uncut Gems,' a film that often sounds like it is itself taking in three movies at once. The thrum of the thing is massive, varied and thick—the noise of the city, a paranoid score, and sometimes you even hear the dialogue." Kevin Garnett's performance was also praised, with Brady Langmann of Esquire calling it the year's best breakout performance, and Alan Siegel of The Ringer calling it "one of the best acting performances by an athlete ever".

=== Accolades ===
According to a list compiled by Metacritic, Uncut Gems was included on the fifth-most year-end "Top Ten" lists of the best films of 2019 published by major film critics and publications.

Award	Date of ceremony	Category	Recipient(s)	Result
Casting Society of America	January 30, 2020	Feature Big Budget – Comedy	Francine Maisler	Nominated
Critics' Choice Movie Awards	January 12, 2020	Best Picture	Uncut Gems	Nominated
Critics' Choice Movie Awards	January 12, 2020	Best Director	Benny Safdie and Josh Safdie	Nominated
Critics' Choice Movie Awards	January 12, 2020	Best Actor	Adam Sandler	Nominated
Critics' Choice Movie Awards	January 12, 2020	Best Editing	Ronald Bronstein and Benny Safdie	Nominated
Detroit Film Critics Society	December 9, 2019	Best Actor	Adam Sandler	Nominated
Detroit Film Critics Society	December 9, 2019	Best Use of Music	Uncut Gems	Nominated
Florida Film Critics Circle	December 23, 2019	Best Original Screenplay	Ronald Bronstein, Benny Safdie, and Josh Safdie	Won
Florida Film Critics Circle	December 23, 2019	Best Score	Daniel Lopatin	Won
Golden Raspberry Awards	March 16, 2020	Razzie Redeemer Award	Adam Sandler	Nominated
Gotham Awards	December 2, 2019	Best Feature	Uncut Gems	Nominated
Gotham Awards	December 2, 2019	Best Actor	Adam Sandler	Nominated
Gotham Awards	December 2, 2019	Breakthrough Actor	Julia Fox	Nominated
Independent Spirit Awards	February 8, 2020	Best Feature	Scott Rudin, Eli Bush, and Sebastian Bear-McClard	Nominated
Independent Spirit Awards	February 8, 2020	Best Director	Benny Safdie and Josh Safdie	Won
Independent Spirit Awards	February 8, 2020	Best Male Lead	Adam Sandler	Won
Independent Spirit Awards	February 8, 2020	Best Screenplay	Ronald Bronstein, Benny Safdie, and Josh Safdie	Nominated
Independent Spirit Awards	February 8, 2020	Best Editing	Ronald Bronstein and Benny Safdie	Won
Los Angeles Film Critics Association Award	December 8, 2019	Best Editing	Ronald Bronstein and Benny Safdie	Runner-up
National Board of Review	January 8, 2020	Best Actor	Adam Sandler	Won
National Board of Review	January 8, 2020	Best Original Screenplay	Ronald Bronstein, Benny Safdie, and Josh Safdie	Won
National Board of Review	January 8, 2020	Top Ten Films	Uncut Gems	Won
New York Film Critics Circle	January 7, 2020	Best Director	Benny Safdie and Josh Safdie	Won
San Diego Film Critics Society	December 9, 2019	Best Actor	Adam Sandler	Nominated
San Diego Film Critics Society	December 9, 2019	Best Director	Benny Safdie and Josh Safdie	Won
San Diego Film Critics Society	December 9, 2019	Best Original Screenplay	Benny Safdie and Josh Safdie	Runner-up
San Diego Film Critics Society	December 9, 2019	Best Editing	Ronald Bronstein and Benny Safdie	Runner-up
Satellite Awards	December 19, 2019	Best Motion Picture – Comedy or Musical	Uncut Gems	Nominated
Satellite Awards	December 19, 2019	Best Actor – Motion Picture Comedy or Musical	Adam Sandler	Nominated
Saturn Awards	2021	Best Thriller Film	Uncut Gems	Nominated
Seattle Film Critics Society	December 19, 2019	Best Picture	Uncut Gems	Nominated
Seattle Film Critics Society	December 19, 2019	Best Director	Benny Safdie and Josh Safdie	Nominated
Seattle Film Critics Society	December 19, 2019	Best Actor	Adam Sandler	Nominated
Seattle Film Critics Society	December 19, 2019	Best Film Editing	Ronald Bronstein and Benny Safdie	Won
Seattle Film Critics Society	December 19, 2019	Best Score	Daniel Lopatin	Won
St. Louis Film Critics Association	December 15, 2019	Best Actor	Adam Sandler	Won

== Legacy ==
The A.V. Club ranked Uncut Gems the 92nd-best film of the 2010s. In June 2025, The New York Times named it the 58th-best film of the 21st century, and New York Times readers voted it 72nd-best. In July 2025, Rolling Stone named it the 75th-best.

Uncut Gems influenced the visual language and camera work in the Pixar film Inside Out 2. The main characters are personifications of the feelings of Riley, a teenage girl, and Uncut Gems influenced the framing of Anxiety's scenes, particularly when Anxiety takes charge of Riley's brain.

Diamond District workers praised the accurate portrayal of the industry and high-stress setting, though some said that certain aspects of Howard's character were exaggerated for dramatic effect, including his gambling addiction, his large debts, and his willingness to evade anti-smuggling laws. Several real-life industry figures had cameos.

Uncut Gems was the Safdie brothers' last feature film before they dissolved their partnership in 2024, though they also collaborated with Sandler on the 2020 short film Goldman v. Silverman. The Safdies worked on a followup film that also starred Sandler, but Benny dropped out. He said that Josh would continue to work on the film and that he had not made significant contributions during pre-production. After the split, Josh turned his attention to Marty Supreme and shot a Netflix comedy special with Sandler.
