= My Name Is Alfred Hitchcock =

- Official film poster
- Directed by: Mark Cousins
- Written by: Mark Cousins
- Produced by: John Archer
- Narrated by: Alistair McGowan
- Cinematography: Mark Cousins
- Edited by: Timo Langer
- Music by: Donna McKevitt
- Production company: Hopscotch Films
- Distributed by: Dogwoof
- Release date: 5 September 2022 (TFF)
- Running time: 120 minutes
- Country: United Kingdom
- Language: English

My Name Is Alfred Hitchcock is a 2022 British documentary film written and directed by Mark Cousins. It is about Alfred Hitchcock, a British filmmaker. It premiered at the 49th Telluride Film Festival on 5 September 2022. It had its United Kingdom premier at the 19th Glasgow Film Festival in March 2023.

== Cast ==
- Alistair McGowan as Alfred Hitchcock (voice only)

== Reception ==
On the review aggregator website Rotten Tomatoes, 93% of 55 critics' reviews are positive, with an average rating of 7.6/10. The website's consensus reads: "A peek at the man behind the persona, or vice versa, the work of Mark Cousins sings with genuine compassion for Alfred Hitchcock." Metacritic, which uses a weighted average, assigned the film a score of 75 out of 100, based on 11 critics, indicating "generally favorable" reviews.

Peter Sobczynski of RogerEbert.com gave the film three and a half stars out of four and wrote, "Hardcore cinema students will no doubt find it a fascinating exploration of Hitchcock's work. At the same time, Cousins presents it in a relaxed manner so that more casual viewers can understand and appreciate it as well."

Peter Bradshaw of The Guardian gave the film four out of five stars, writing, "As ever, there is real evangelism in Cousins's work and in My Name Is Alfred Hitchcock there is so much to learn and enjoy. You come away from it with your senses fine-tuned."
