= Peggy Guggenheim: Art Addict =

- Directed by: Lisa Immordino Vreeland
- Written by: Bernadine Colish; Lisa Immordino Vreeland
- Produced by: Dan Braun; David Koh; Stanley F. Buchthal; Lisa Immordino Vreeland
- Cinematography: Peter Trilling
- Edited by: Bernadine Colish; Jed Parker
- Music by: Steven Argila
- Production companies: Dakota Group; Fischio Films; Submarine Entertainment
- Distributed by: Submarine Deluxe
- Release dates: April 20, 2015 (Tribeca); November 6, 2015
- Running time: 95 minutes
- Country: United States
- Language: English
- Box office: $57,047

Peggy Guggenheim: Art Addict is a 2015 American documentary film directed by Lisa Immordino Vreeland about art collector Peggy Guggenheim. The film premiered on April 20, 2015, at the Tribeca Film Festival.

Clips from Maya Deren's unfinished film The Witch's Cradle (1943) are featured in this documentary, since Deren made the film with Marcel Duchamp at Guggenheim's Art of This Century gallery.

== Reception ==
The film received very positive reviews. On Rotten Tomatoes, the film has a 94% rating based on 16 reviews, with an average rating of 6.8/10. Metacritic reports a 65 out of 100 rating, based on 7 critics, indicating "generally favorable reviews".
