= Annette Insdorf =

American film historian

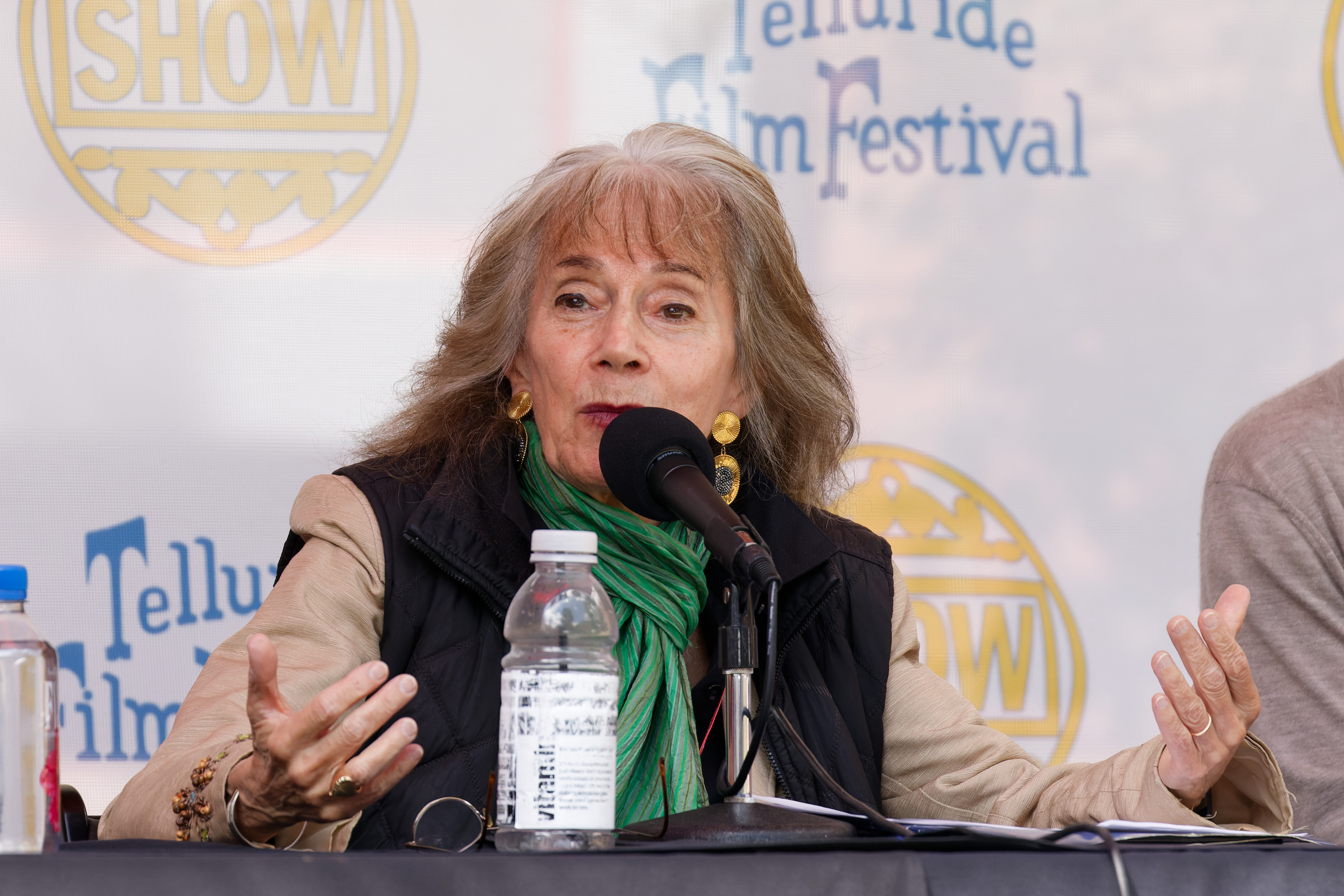
- Insdorf at the 2024 Telluride Film Festival
- Born: 1950 (age 75–76); Paris, France
- Occupations: Film historian, author
- Spouse: Mark Ethan (m. 1999)

Annette Insdorf (born 1950) is an American film historian, author and interviewer, who is host of Reel Pieces.

== Career ==
Born in Paris in 1950 to Polish Jewish survivors of the Holocaust, Insdorf and her family moved to New York City in 1954. She graduated from Forest Hills High School. Initially desiring to be a performer, Insdorf attended Juilliard's singing program, however upon her parents encouragement, she instead went to Queens College where she obtained her Bachelor of Arts in 1972, as well as her PhD from Yale University in 1975.

Insdorf is a frequent panelist at various film festivals, most consistently at the annual Telluride Film Festival, and often hosted annual coverage of the Cannes Film Festival alongside Roger Ebert. Insdorf has written numerous books on various cinema-related topics, including on filmmakers François Truffaut and Philip Kaufman. In 2018, she was awarded the Mel Novikoff Award at the 2018 San Francisco International Film Festival. Telluride awarded Insdorf with its Special Medal in 2021.

Insdorf made an appearance in PBS's Woody Allen: A Documentary (2011) and HBO's Spielberg (2017).

Insdorf has taught film at Columbia University since 1987.
