= Rémi Allier =

French film director

- Born: March 2, 1988 (age 37); Mâcon, France
- Occupation: Director

Rémi Allier (born March 2, 1988) is a French director.

In 2019 he received a César Award for his short film Little Hands.

== Biography ==
After attending the Lumière high school in Lyon and a BTS diploma in "editing and post production" in Paris, Allier studied filmmaking at the IAD in Louvain-la-Neuve, Belgium.

In February 2019 he received the César Award for his short film Little Hands.

He is currently living in Brussels.

== Filmography ==
- Jan (2012) - co-director with Pablo Muñoz Gomez (short film)
- Zinneke (2013) - writer, director (student short film)
- Little Hands (2017) - writer, director (short film)
