= It Was in May =

- Written by: Grigory Baklanov
- Directed by: Marlen Khutsiev
- Starring: Aleksandr Arzhilovsky; Pyotr Todorovsky
- Country of origin: Soviet Union
- Original language: Russian

Production
- Producer: D. Avrutin
- Cinematography: Vladimir Osherov
- Running time: 115 min
- Production company: Studio Ekran

Original release
- Release: 10 May 1970

It Was in May (Russian: Был месяц май, romanized: Byl mesyats may) is a 1970 Soviet war drama film directed by Marlen Khutsiev that depicts first weeks after the war had ended.

== Plot ==
In May 1945, shortly after the end of the Great Patriotic War, a group of Soviet reconnaissance soldiers takes up temporary residence on the farm of a wealthy German pig farmer named Rashke, who lives there with his much younger wife and teenage son. Rashke appears friendly, even servile, toward the Soviet soldiers and their leader, Lieutenant Nikolaev, but he and his family leave the farm each night to sleep elsewhere. One day, Nikolaev crashes his motorcycle en route to a nearby town and is helped by fellow soldiers stationed in an abandoned mansion. Spending the day with them, he discusses the war, their dreams of postwar life, and the well-organized German farms around them. Late that night, they wander into a deserted concentration camp and are haunted by the silent barracks and dark corridors, filled with remnants of the camp’s former inmates. In a room with unusually thick walls, large furnaces, and ceiling vents, they speculate that it was once a boiler room.

The next day, back at the farm, Rashke's son accuses one of the soldiers of killing one of their pigs. When the other soldiers react angrily, revealing that the accused soldier is a survivor of a village burned to the ground, Nikolaev orders them to calm down. Later that evening, as Rashke and his family leave, three emaciated former camp prisoners appear. One, a Polish man named Stefan, recounts how his wife Katarzyna had been forced to work for Rashke until exhaustion and hunger drove her to madness, leading Rashke to send her to the camp where she was executed. Stefan describes the gas chambers and crematorium he was forced to build, where countless women and children perished, their ashes spread over the surrounding fields as fertilizer. Another former prisoner, a German engineer who speaks Russian, recalls his wife receiving a bill to pay for the state expenses of her communist brother’s execution. Reflecting on prewar life, he speaks bitterly about the betrayal of ordinary Germans by their country. A third prisoner, also German and haunted by memories of guard dogs, mutters bitterly in German. Shaken by these stories, the soldiers attempt to capture Rashke, but he disappears, leaving them to confront the war's lingering horrors. The film opens with wartime newsreel footage and closes with peaceful postwar city scenes, underscored by Sonny Bono’s song “Mama” arranged by Paul Mauriat, creating a poignant contrast with the grim story.

== Cast ==
- Aleksandr Arzhilovsky as Lieutenant Nikolayev
- Pyotr Todorovsky as Vladimir Yakovenko
- Sergey Shakurov as Margoslin
- Viktor Uralsky as Golub
- Eugenija Pleškytė as Gerta
- Vladimir Gostyukhin as Nyrkov
- Vaclovas Blėdis as Rashke
- Igor Klass as Avdey
