= Lisa Immordino Vreeland =

Author and film director

Lisa Immordino Vreeland is an author and film director.

She is married to Alexander Vreeland, the grandson Diana Vreeland.

== Filmography ==
- Diana Vreeland: The Eye Has to Travel (2011)
- Peggy Guggenheim: Art Addict (2015)
- Love, Cecil (2017)
- Light: When Photography Was Undiscovered, 1971-1987 (2020)
- Truman & Tennessee: An Intimate Conversation (2020)
- Unknown Beauty: François Nars (2023)
- Jean Cocteau (2024)
- Le Bal Paris (Upcoming)
