= The Corridors of Power (film) =

2022 documentary film

The Corridors of Power is a 2022 documentary film which examines United States foreign policy since the collapse of the USSR. It was directed by Dror Moreh. In 2024, it was re-released as a television series titled Corridors of Power: Should America Police the World?, produced by Moreh and producer Sol Goodman. The film version was produced by Moreh, Goodman, Estelle Fialon and Vanessa Ciewcevski.
