= Dror Moreh =

Israeli cinematographer and director (born 1961)

- דרור מורה
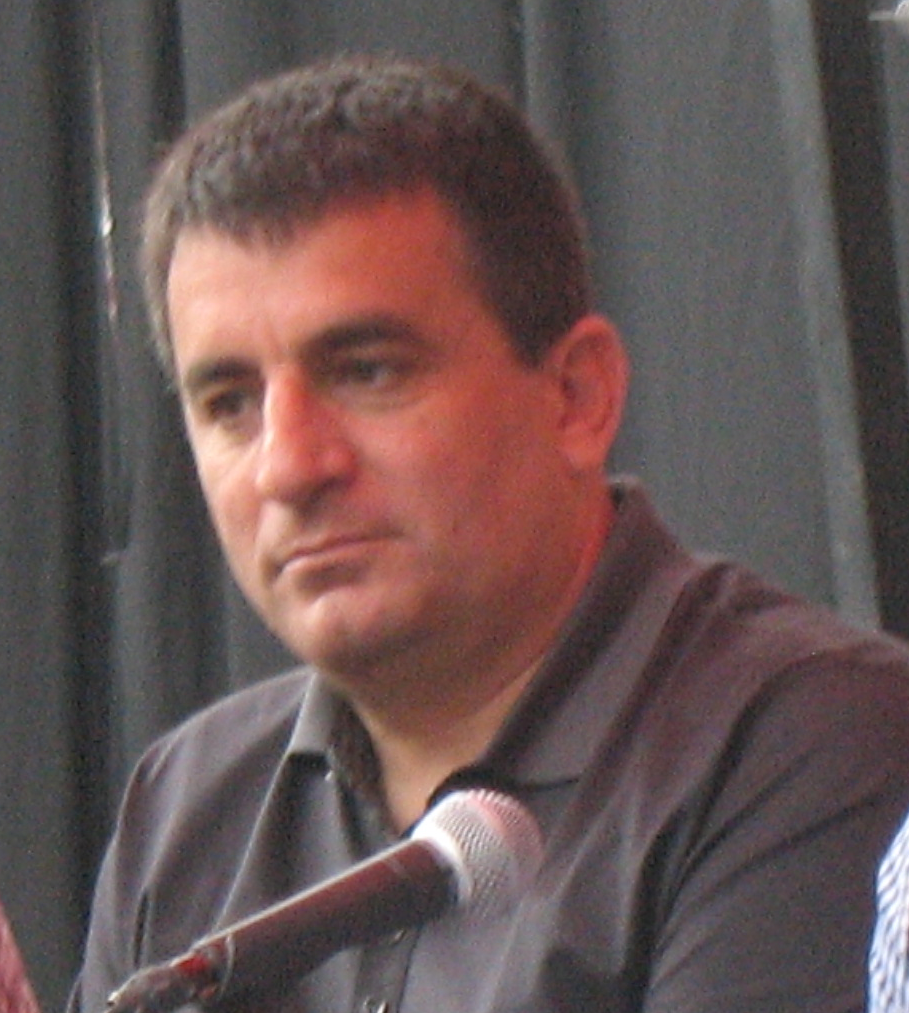
- Born: 4 November 1961 (age 64)
- Occupations: Cinematographer and director

Dror Moreh (Hebrew: דרור מורה; born 4 November 1961) is an Israeli cinematographer and director.

== Film career ==
Moreh's first film as director was Sharon, an investigation into the appeal of Israeli prime minister, Ariel Sharon. His film, The Gatekeepers (2012), was nominated for Best Documentary Feature at the 85th Academy Awards. The film attracted attention partly due to its controversial interviews with the head of Israel's Security Agency (Shin Bet). Moreh said, "I think that those guys who implement the power and force… understand that power and force can lead you up to a certain point, and beyond that, you have to take other measures."

The Human Factor, which is about the Israeli-Palestinian conflict was released January 2021.

Moreh directed the 2022 documentary film The Corridors Of Power, an examination of United States foreign policy since the collapse of the USSR.

Corridors of Power: Should America Police the World?, a DMP Films production in association with the BBC, and directed by Moreh, was released in August 2024. The eight episodes span the administrations of four US Presidents, and examine how American leaders responded to reports of genocide, war crimes and mass atrocities from the end of the Cold War until 2016.

== See also ==
- Cinema of Israel
