= Telluride Film Festival =

Annual film festival held in Colorado, US

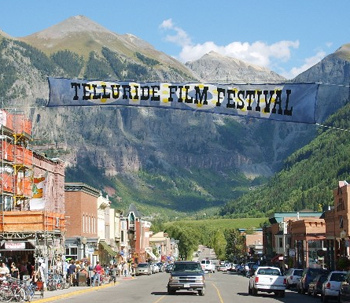
- Location: Telluride, Colorado, United States
- Founded: 1974
- Website: telluridefilmfestival.org

Latest: 53rd
- 54th 52nd

The Telluride Film Festival (TFF) is a film festival held annually in Telluride, Colorado, during Labor Day weekend, the first Monday in September.

The 53rd edition took place between September 4 and 7, 2026.

== History ==
First held on August 30, 1974, the festival, hosted at the Sheridan Opera House, was founded by Bill and Stella Pence, Tom Luddy, and James Card of Eastman-Kodak Film Preserve . It is operated by the National Film Preserve.

In 2010, TFF partnered with UCLA School of Theater, Film and Television. This partnership created FilmLab which was a program that focuses on the art and industry of filmmaking. This program is custom-designed for ten selected filmmaker graduates from UCLA. The partnership was further extended in 2012, the two partners created a mutually curated film program on UCLA's Westwood campus.

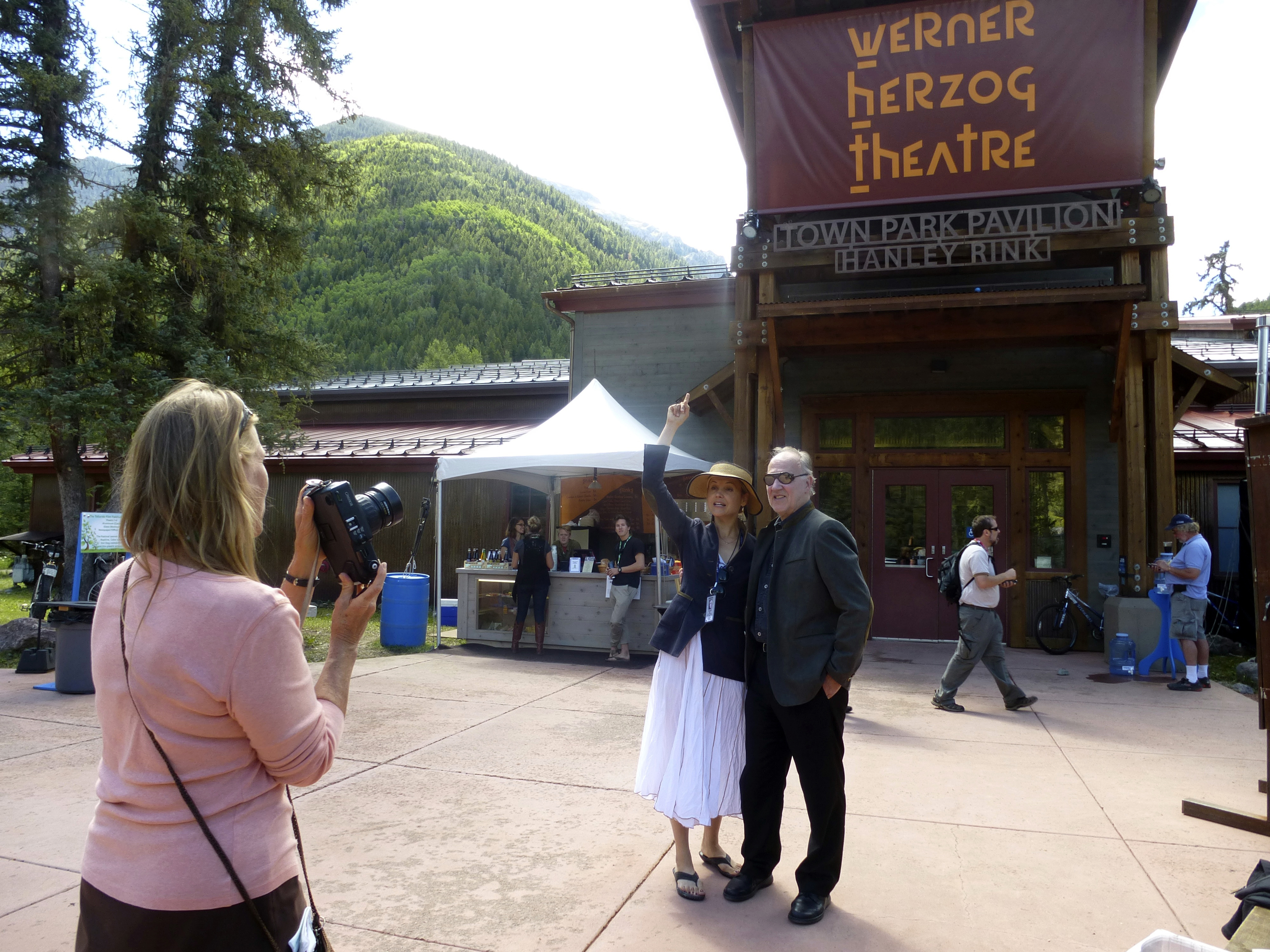
Werner Herzog and Lena Herzog outside the Werner Herzog Theatre in 2013.

In 2013 the festival celebrated its 40th anniversary with the addition of a new venue, the Werner Herzog Theatre and an extra day of programming.

The festival went on hiatus in 2020 due to the impact of the COVID-19 pandemic, and resumed a year later in 2021.

== Program ==
The bulk of the program is made up of new films, and there is an informal tradition that new films must be shown for the first time in North America to be eligible for the festival. Telluride is situated on the international film festival calendar after the Cannes Film Festival, but just before the Toronto International Film Festival and the New York Film Festival. This insistence on premieres has led to Telluride's being associated with the discovery of a number of important new films and filmmakers like Michael Moore (whose first film Roger and Me debuted there in 1989) and Robert Rodriguez (whose first feature El Mariachi got its first festival screening there in 1992).

The festival has also hosted the American premiere of films such as My Dinner With Andre (Louis Malle, 1981), Stranger than Paradise (Jim Jarmusch, 1984), Blue Velvet (David Lynch, 1986), The Civil War (Ken Burns, 1990), The Crying Game (Neil Jordan, 1992), Mulholland Drive (David Lynch, 2001), Brokeback Mountain (Ang Lee, 2005), The Imitation Game (Morten Tyldum, 2014), Sully (Clint Eastwood, 2016), Moonlight (Barry Jenkins, 2016), Lady Bird (Greta Gerwig, 2017), Saltburn (Emerald Fennell, 2023), and You Can See Everything (Nathan Fielder and Lance Oppenheim, 2026).

The festival maintains a tradition of not officially announcing its lineup until just one day before the festival begins each year. Despite this, at least some of each year's lineup can be predicted in advance by parsing the Toronto International Film Festival's program announcements for whether a film is tagged as a world, North American or Canadian-only premiere.

Since 1995, a special medallion has also been presented annually, usually to a non-filmmaker who has had a major impact on American or international film culture. Past recipients include Milos Stehlik (founder of Facets Multi-Media), HBO, the French film magazine Positif, Ted Turner, and Janus Films.

=== Silver Medallion ===
The Telluride Film Festival Silver Medallion is awarded to three honorees each year.

The 1974 tributes honored Francis Ford Coppola, Gloria Swanson and Leni Riefenstahl. Other tributees have included Riz Ahmed, Pedro Almodóvar, Robert Altman, Christian Bale, Cate Blanchett, George Clooney, Toni Colette, Penélope Cruz, Marion Cotillard, Daniel Day-Lewis, Catherine Deneuve, Gérard Depardieu, Peter Dinklage, Clint Eastwood, Jodie Foster, Peter Greenaway, Sterling Hayden, Werner Herzog, Harvey Keitel, Ang Lee, David Lynch, Jack Nicholson, Mads Mikkelsen, Peter O'Toole, Sara Polley, Mickey Rooney, John Schlesinger, Jean Simmons, Meryl Streep, Tilda Swinton, Andrei Tarkovsky and Peter Weir.

== Style ==
As of 2015 the program was created by founder and artistic director Tom Luddy, executive director Julie Huntsinger and one of the Telluride Film Festival guest directors, who change each year. These have included Errol Morris, Peter Bogdanovich, Bertrand Tavernier, Salman Rushdie, Don DeLillo, Peter Sellars, Stephen Sondheim, Buck Henry, and Michael Ondaatje.

Each year, an artist is selected to produce the poster art for the festival. Those who have accepted the commission include Chuck Jones, David Salle, Doug and Mike Starn, Dottie Attie, Jim Dine, Ed Ruscha, Francesco Clemente, Dave McKean, Gary Larson and Luke Dorman of Meow Wolf. The sole requirement for the poster is that the word SHOW be featured. This is a tribute to a large illuminated sign which says "Show" and sits outside of the Sheridan Opera House, the festival venue where the Silver Medallions are awarded.

== Reception ==
Susan Sontag, in her 1974 essay Fascinating Fascism, lamented that a film about Leni Riefenstahl was "the guest of honor at a new cinéphile-controlled film festival held in the summer in Colorado".

After serving as guest director in 2001, Salman Rushdie wrote that, "It is extraordinarily exciting, in this age of the triumph of capitalism, to discover an event dedicated not to commerce but to love".

Kenneth Turan of the Los Angeles Times wrote in 2002 that "the hothouse filmocentric universe Telluride creates over a Labor Day weekend has always been more a religion than anything as ordinary as a festival, complete with messianic believers and agnostic scoffers." Jeffrey Ruoff, a film historian at Dartmouth College, noted in 2015 that "Early buzz at Telluride opens the fall season of North American award speculation that climaxes with the Oscars."

== Archive ==
The Academy Film Archive houses the Telluride Film Festival Collection, which consists of conversations with iconic filmmakers, tributes, symposium and seminars dating back to 1978.
