= 44th News and Documentary Emmy Awards =

- Date: September 27, 2023 (News Categories); September 28, 2023 (Documentary Categories)
- Location: Palladium Times Square, New York City
- Presented by: National Academy of Television Arts and Sciences
- Most awards: VICE News Tonight (9)
- Most nominations: VICE News Tonight (28)

Television/radio coverage
- Network: Watch.TheEmmys.TV

The 44th News and Documentary Emmy Awards were presented National Academy of Television Arts and Sciences (NATAS), to honor the best in American news and documentary programming in 2022. The winners were announced on two ceremonies held at Palladium Times Square in New York City and live-streamed at Watch.TheEmmys.TV and other associated apps. The winners of the news categories were announced on September 27, 2023, while the ones for the documentary categories were revealed on September 28, 2023.

The nominees were announced on July 27, 2023. Vice's news program VICE News Tonight led the nominations with 28 nominations followed by CBS's 60 Minutes with eleven, and National Geographic's Trafficked with Mariana van Zeller and PBS' FRONTLINE, both with nine. CNN was the most nominated network with 45 nominations. The nominees for the international categories were announced on August 15, 2023. The Gold and Silver Circle inductees were announced on August 29, 2023, dedicated to honour several professionals for their distinguished service within the television industry for 50 or 25 years respectively.

VICE News Tonight received the most awards with eight, while HBO Max's The Janes and National Geographic's Retrograde were the most awarded documentaries with three wins each. American journalist and new anchor Wolf Blitzer and American film director Barbara Kopple were honored with the Lifetime Achievement Award at the news and documentary ceremonies, respectively.

== Winners and nominees ==
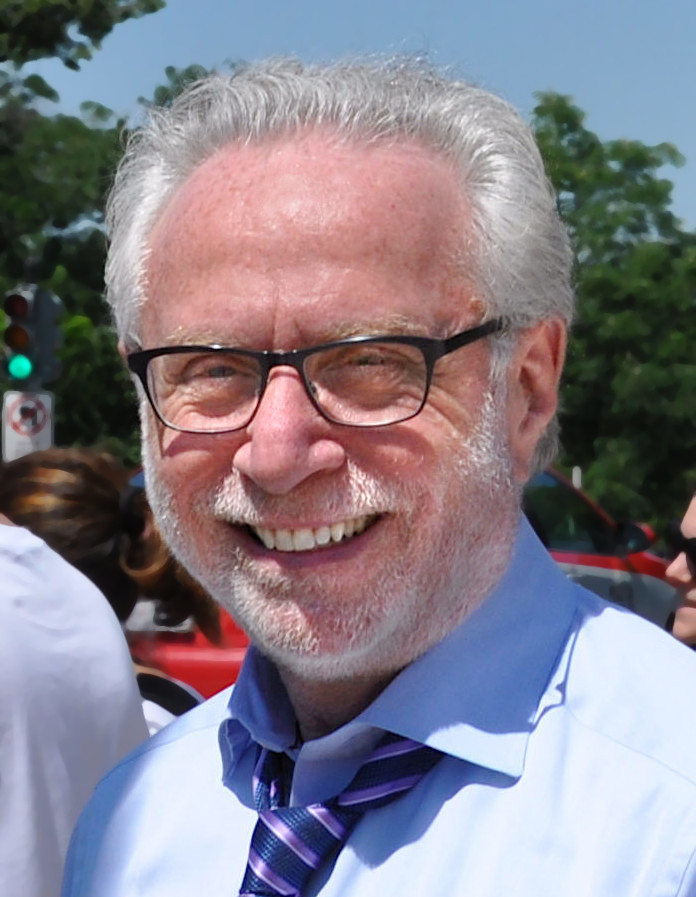
Wolf Blitzer, Lifetime Achievement Award recipient

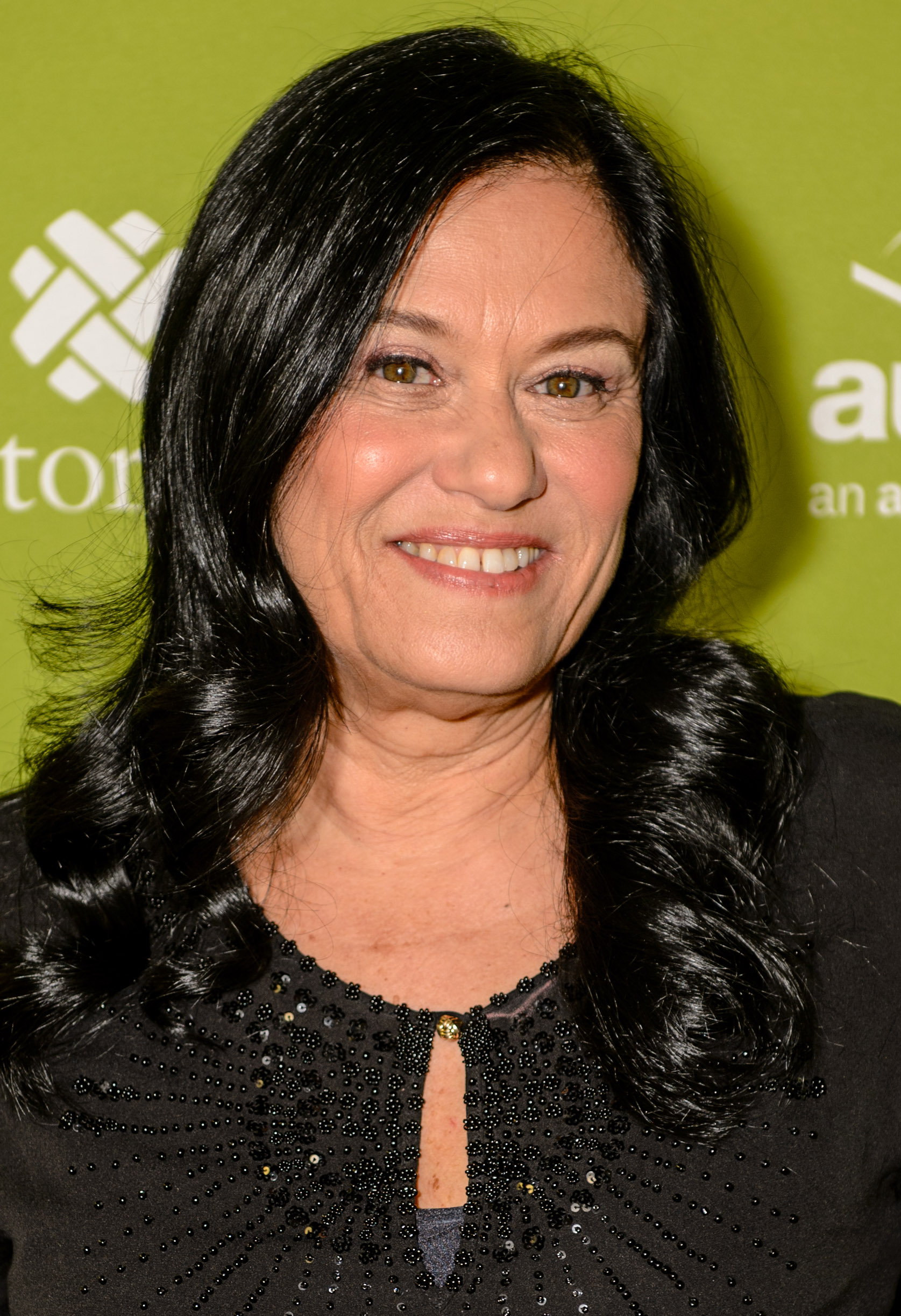
Barbara Kopple, Lifetime Achievement Award recipient

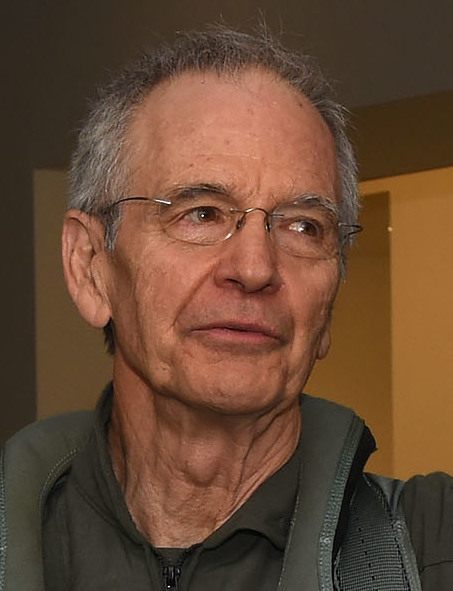
David Martin, Golden Circle Inductee

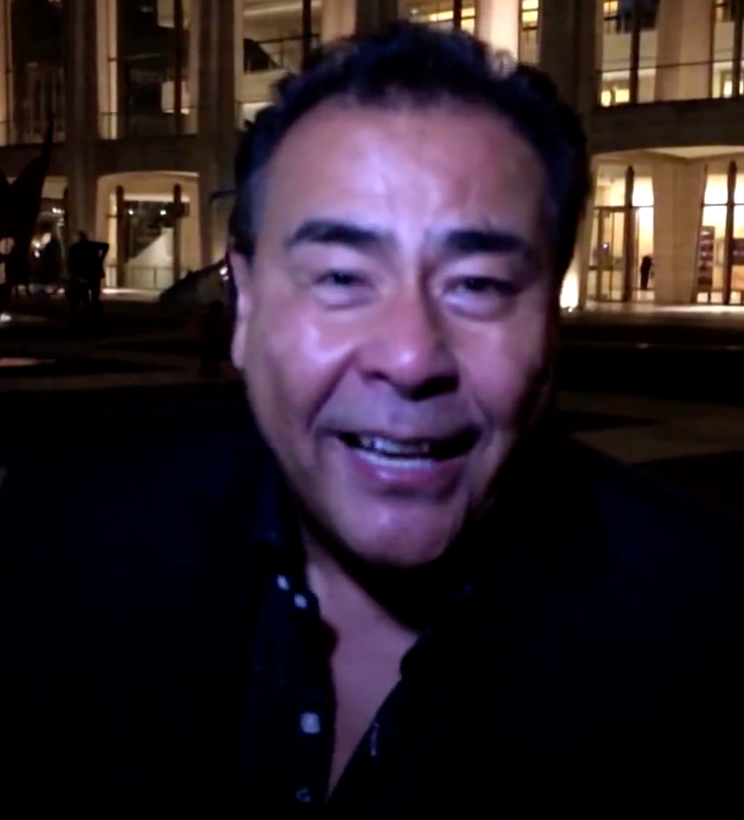
John Quiñones, Gold Circle Inductee

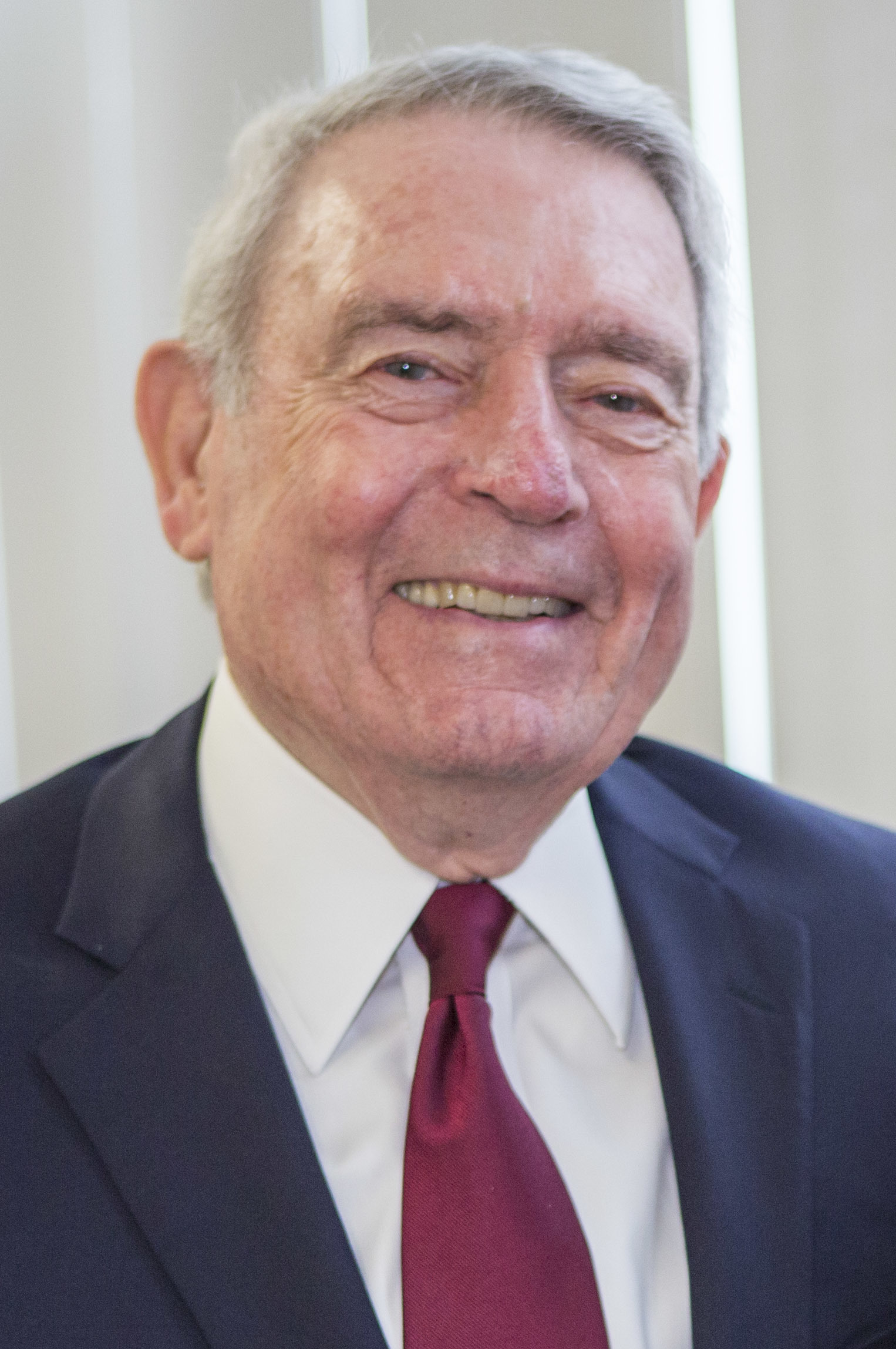
Dan Rather, Gold Circle Inductee

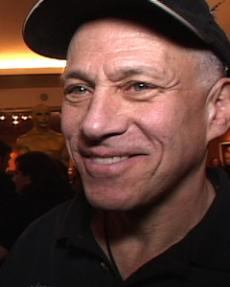
Jon Alpert, Gold Circle Inductee

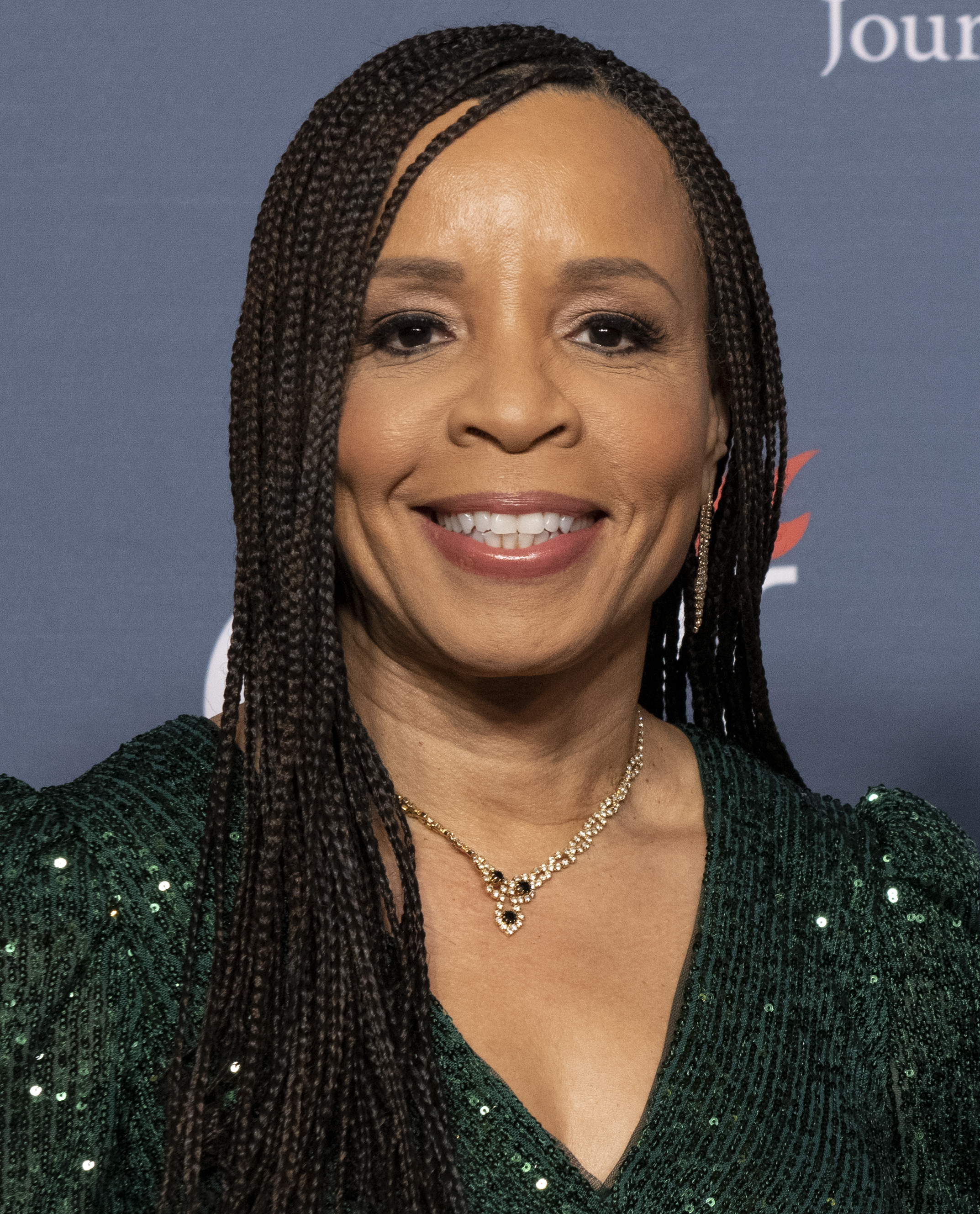
Kim Godwin, Silver Circle Inductee

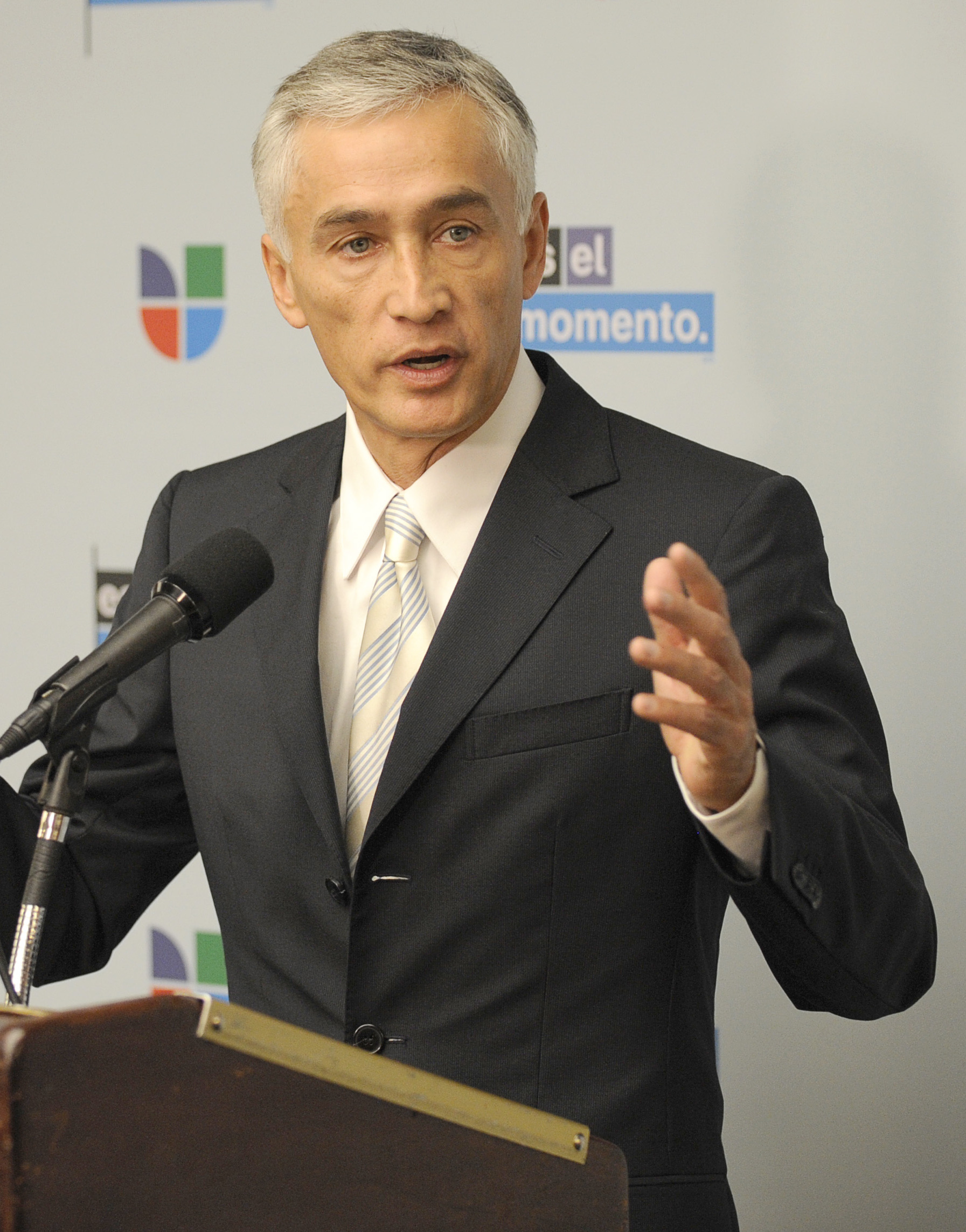
Jorge Ramos, Outstanding Journalist in Spanish Language Media winner

The nominees were announced on July 28, 2023. The winners were announced on September 27 and 28, 2023.

=== Lifetime Achievement Award ===
- Wolf Blitzer (news)
- Barbara Kopple (documentary)

=== Gold Circle Inductees ===
- David Martin – National Security correspondent of CBS News (news)
- John Quiñones – ABC News correspondent, 20/20, Nightline and Good Morning America, What Would You Do? host (news)
- Dan Rather – anchor, journalist, founder, News and Guts (news)
- Jon Alpert – documentarian, journalist, cofounder of DCTV (documentary)
- Keiko Tsuno – documentarian, journalist, cofounder of DCTV (documentary)

=== Silver Circle Inductees ===
- Steve Fastook – Senior Vice President of Operations, CNBC (news)
- Kim Godwin – President of ABC News (news)
- Rand Morrison – executive producer of CBS News Sunday Morning (news)
- Steve Osunsami – Senior National correspondent of ABC News (news)
- Otto Padron – President & CEO of Meruelo Media (news)
- Thomas Snowden – editor of NBC News (news)
- Daniel H. Birman – documentarian, Birman Productions (documentary)
- Lois Vossen – executive Producer, Independent Lens (documentary)
- Chris White, executive Producer, American Documentary (documentary)

=== News Programming ===
Outstanding Live News Program	Outstanding Recorded News Program
ABC World News Tonight with David Muir (ABC); Anderson Cooper 360° (CNN); CBS Evening News with Norah O'Donnell (CBS); CBS Mornings (CBS); NBC Nightly News with Lester Holt (NBC)	CBS Sunday Morning (CBS); 60 Minutes (CBS); The Circus: Inside the Greatest Political Show on Earth (Showtime); Nightline (ABC); VICE News Tonight (Vice)
Outstanding Live Breaking News Coverage	Outstanding Edited Breaking News Coverage
CNN Worldwide: "Russian Invasion of Ukraine" (CNN); CBS Mornings: "Uvalde" (CBS); CNN Worldwide: "The War in Ukraine" (CNN); NBC News Specials + NBC News Now: "Hurricane Ian" (NBC); NBC News Specials: "Uvalde School Shooting" (NBC)	60 Minutes: "Platform 4" (CBS); 20/20: "Putin's War: The Battle to Save Ukraine" (ABC); Erin Burnett OutFront: "Fleeing Ukraine" (CNN); VICE News Tonight: "Inside an Armed Bank Raid in Lebanon" (Vice); VICE News Tonight: "Inside Kyiv During the Start of Russia's Invasion" (Vice)
Outstanding Continuing News Coverage: Short Form	Outstanding Continuing News Coverage: Long Form
Clarissa Ward: War in Ukraine (CNN); Anderson Cooper 360°: "Shimon Prokupecz: Unraveling Uvalde" (CNN); BBC World News America: "Afghanistan Under the Taliban" (BBC World News); BBC World News America: "War in Ukraine" (BBC World News); Matthew Chance: Ukraine (CNN); Nick Paton Walsh: Ukraine's Bitter War (CNN)	VICE News Tonight: "Putin's War on Ukraine" (Vice); 60 Minutes: "Belief in the Ballot, Dominion, and Voting Rights & Wrongs" (CBS); 60 Minutes: "War in Ukraine" (CBS); ABC News: "Uvalde 365: A Year in the Community" (ABC); Nightline: "A Reckoning: The Legacy of Indian Boarding Schools" (ABC)
Outstanding Soft Feature Story: Short Form	Outstanding Soft Feature Story: Long Form
I Stutter (The New York Times); CNN Heroes: An All-Star Tribute: "Nelly Cheboi - Upcycling Tech to Uplift Lives" (CNN); Meet the Woman Fighting for the Rights of Voters Who Can't Read (ProPublica); Nightline: "Swimming While Black" (ABC); Sunday NFL Countdown: "Phil & Franco" (ESPN); VICE News Tonight: "Airlines are Turning to Black Women to Save Them" (Vice)	Op-Docs: "My Disability Roadmap" (The New York Times); 60 Minutes: "Sharswood" (CBS); In Real Life: "The New Death" (Newsy); NBC News Digital: "Dear Noah: Pages from a Family Diary" (NBC); Nightline: "Mi Niño: Chile's Stolen Children" (ABC); VICE World News: "The Teenage Mafia Academy" (Vice)
Outstanding Hard News Feature Story: Short Form	Outstanding Hard News Feature Story: Long Form
Anderson Cooper 360°: "10-Year-Old Trapped with the Uvalde School Shooter Repeatedly Called 911 for Help" (CNN); ABC News Live Prime with Linsey Davis and Nightline: "Inside Kharkiv's Battle of Resilience" (ABC); How Mormon Church 'Help Line' Hid Child Sex Abuse (The Associated Press); Nightline: "The Horrors in Bucha" (ABC); VICE News Tonight: "Inside Somalia's Nightmare Drought" (Vice)	FRONTLINE: "Putin's War at Home" (PBS); 60 Minutes: "Pathogen X" (CBS); NBC Nightly Films: "The Reckoning: An American Genocide" (NBC); Nightline: "Saving Malaika" (ABC); On Assignment with Richard Engel: "Ukraine: The Search for Justice" (MSNBC)
Outstanding Investigative News Coverage: Short Form	Outstanding Investigative News Coverage: Long Form
Anderson Cooper 360°: "Investigating Uvalde" (CNN); CBS Mornings: "Decades of Exposure" (CBS); How Iran's Security Forces Use Rape to Quell Protests (CNN); The Situation Room with Wolf Blitzer: "Horror at Kabul's Abbey Gate" (CNN); The Situation Room with Wolf Blitzer: "Russia Plunders Sudan's Gold to Boost Putin's War in Ukraine" (CNN)	FRONTLINE: "Afghanistan Undercover" (PBS); FRONTLINE: "Crime Scene: Bucha" (PBS); Caught on Camera, Traced by Phone: The Russian Military Unit That Killed Dozens in Bucha (The New York Times); Trafficked with Mariana van Zeller: "Fish Pirates" (National Geographic); VICE News Tonight: "Above the Law: Investigating the Louisville Metro Police Department" (Vice)
Outstanding Live News Special	Outstanding Recorded News Special
Live from the Capitol: January 6, One Year Later (CNN); ABC News: "NASA's SpaceX Crew-5 Mission | Liftoff to Space" (ABC); ABC News Special Report: "Queen Elizabeth" (ABC); CBS News: "CBS News: America Decides Campaign '22 – Midterm Elections" (CBS); NBC News Specials: "Decision 2022: The Balance of Power" (NBC); Noticiero Telemundo: "Decision 2022: Battle for the Power" (Telemundo)	Ukraine: A Mother's War (NBC News Now); ABC News Live: "The Struggle to Understand" (ABC); ABC News Soul of a Nation Presents: "Together as One: Celebrating Asian American, Native Hawaiian and Pacific Islander Heritage" (ABC); Burning Questions: Covering Climate Now (WORLD); Field Report with Paola Ramos: "Florida 2022" (MSNBC); CBS Sunday Morning: "CBS Sunday Morning: A Nation Divided?" (CBS); VICE News Tonight: "On the Ground in Ukraine: A VICE News Tonight Special Report" (Vice)
Outstanding News Discussion & Analysis	Outstanding News Analysis: Editorial and Opinion
VICE News Tonight: "Inside Rights: Teenagers Discuss Abortion" (Vice); CNN Tonight: "77 Minutes in Uvalde" (CNN); Fareed Zakaria GPS: "The Fall of Kabul, One Year Later" (CNN); State of the Union with Jake Tapper: "Russia's War" (CNN); This Week with George Stephanopoulos: "On the Brink of War" (ABC)	The New York Times Opinion Video: "The Taliban Promised Them Amnesty. Then They Executed Them" (The New York Times); All In with Chris Hayes: "From Kanye to Trump" (MSNBC); State of the Union: "Jake Tapper on Trump's dinner with antisemite" (CNN); The New York Times Opinion Video: "I'm a Pro-Life Pastor, but I Support a Woman's Right to Choose" (The New York Times); The New York Times Opinion Video: "We Know the Real Cause of the Crisis in Our Hospitals. It's Greed" (The New York Times)
Outstanding Live Interview: Short Form	Outstanding Live Interview: Long Form
Anderson Cooper 360°: "Uvalde Shootng, Anderson Cooper Interviews Angel Garza" (CNN); Anderson Cooper 360°: "Anderson Cooper and Olena Gnes - Mother of Three Living in a Bomb Shelter in Kviv" (CNN); Erin Burnett OutFront: "Erin Burnen & Serhiy Perebyinis" (CNN); The Lead with Jake Tapper: "Worldwide Exclusive: President Zelensky's First Interview as War Leader" (CNN); The Situation Room with Wolf Blitzer: "Blitzer & Adel Al-Jubeir" (CNN); This Week with George Stephanopoulos: "Defying Putin on The Air" (ABC); TODAY: "College Football Star's Brave Decision" (NBC)	Amanpour: "Russian Presidential Spokesperson Dmitry Peskov interviewed by Christiane Amanpour" (CNN); Anderson Cooper 360°: "Speaker Nancy Pelosi Describes Her Experience Following Husband's Anack That Was Intended for Her" (CNN); The New York Times DealBook Summit: "Sam Bankman-Fried with Andrew Ross Sorkin" (The New York Times); State of the Union with Jake Tapper: "Jake Tapper interview Mississippi Gov. Tate Reeves" (CNN); TODAY: "Savannah Guthrie Interviews Bill Barr" (NBC)
Outstanding Edited Interview	Outstanding Emerging Journalist
60 Minutes: "President Zelenskyy" (CBS); CNN Special Report: "Finally Home: The Trevor Reed Interview" (CNN); Dateline NBC: "Bill Barr: In the Eye of the Storm" (NBC); Nightline: "Lia Thomas" (ABC); World News Tonight with David Muir and 20/20: "Breaking with the President: The Mike Pence Interview" (ABC)	Selina Wang (CNN); Al-Hlou (The New York Times); Ellison Barber (NBC); Zinhle Essamuah (NBC); Ashan Singh (ABC)
Outstanding Science, Technology or Environmental Coverage	Outstanding Health or Medical Coverage
In Real Life: "Plastic Time Bomb" (Newsy); Trafficked with Mariana van Zeller: "Amazon Mafia" (National Geographic); World's Untold Stories: "The Brain Collectors" (CNN); VICE News Tonight: "Where Protecting the Environment Gets You Killed" (Vice); VICE News Tonight: "'They're Watching Us': Inside the Company Surveilling Millions of Students" (Vice)	VICE News Tonight: "Beyond Fentanyl" (Vice); Fault Lines: "A Toxic Feed: Social Media and Teen Mental Health" (Al Jazeera International USA); The New York Times Opinion Video: "This Is What a Post-Roe Abortion Looks Like" (The New York Times); VICE News Tonight: "Cuba's Healthcare Crisis" (Vice); VICE News Tonight: "Post-Roe America" (Vice)
Outstanding Arts, Culture or Entertainment Coverage	Outstanding Business, Consumer or Economic Coverage
VICE News Tonight: "The Dark Side of Manga" (Vice); 20/20: "Cinderella: The Reunion" (ABC); ABC News Soul of a Nation Presents: "PRIDE: To Be Seen" (ABC); CNN FlashDocs: "Taking on Taylor Swift" (CNN); Nightline: "What America Owes: The Stolen Generation" (ABC)	VICE News Tonight: "The Price of Purity: Inside the Wellness Industry's Controversial Supply Chains" (Vice); Africa+: "Black Snow: Nigeria’s Oil Catastrophe" (Bloomberg); Trafficked with Mariana van Zeller: "Stolen Cars" (National Geographic); VICE News Tonight: "VICE News Investigates: Mafia Land" (Vice); VICE News Tonight: "Undercover in Guyana" (Vice)
Outstanding Crime and Justice Coverage
VICE News Tonight: "No Justice for Women in the Taliban's Afghanistan" (Vice); Dateline NBC: "Dark Waters" (NBC); Dateline NBC: "What Happened to Anton Black?" (NBC); Soul of a Nation Presents: "X / o n e r a t e d – The Murder of Malcolm X and 55 Years to Justice" (ABC); Trafficked with Mariana van Zeller: "White Supremacy" (National Geographic)

=== Spanish Language Programming ===
Outstanding News Program in Spanish	Outstanding Journalist in Spanish Language Media
¡Despierta América! (Univision); Al Punto (Univision); Noticias Telemundo en la Noche (Telemundo); Noticiero Telemundo (Telemundo); Noticiero Univision (Univision)	Jorge Ramos (Univision); Ilia Calderon (Univision); Maria Antonieta Collins (Univision); Pedro Ultreras (Univision); Julio Vaqueiro (Telemundo)
Outstanding Coverage of a Breaking News Story in Spanish	Outstanding Investigative Journalism in Spanish
Noticiero Telemundo: "Ira de Putin" (Telemundo); Aquí y Ahora: "Devastación de Ian" (Univision); Conclusiones con Fernando del Rincón: "La Guerra de Rusia en Ucrania" (CNN en Español); Noticiero Telemundo: "Uvalde" (Telemundo); Noticiero Univision: "Guerra en Ucrania" (Univision); Noticiero Univision: "Masacre en Uvalde" (Univision)	Aquí y Ahora: "Persecución Mortal" (Univision); Aquí y Ahora: "Se Busca Trabajo" (Univision); Caro Quintero: Narco de Narcos (ViX); Conclusiones con Fernando del Rincón: "Protected Witness" (CNN en Español); Noticiero Telemundo: "Unidad Investigativa: Venezolanos" (Telemundo)
Outstanding Feature Story in Spanish
Ritos de Pasaje: "Sicarios" (Vice); Aquí y Ahora / Univision Investiga: "Ley de la selva" (Univision); Fentanilo: futura para el narco, muerte para la humanidad (ViX); A Sense Of Community: "Iztapalapa" (Al Jazeera International USA); Univision Noticias: "Unidos en Iowa: Latinos luchan por apoyos económicos en tiempos de pandemia" (Univision)

=== Documentary Programming ===
Best Documentary	Outstanding Arts and Culture Documentary
The Janes (HBO Max); CNN Films: "Roadrunner: A Film About Anthony Bourdain" (CNN); Escape from Kabul (HBO Max); FRONTLINE, Associated Press: "Putin's Attack on Ukraine: Documenting War Crimes" (PBS); Good Night Oppy (Amazon Prime)	MTV Documentary Films: "Art & Krimes by Krimes" (Paramount+); CNN Films: "Roadrunner: A Film About Anthony Bourdain" (CNN); Great Performances: "The Conductor" (PBS); Is That Black Enough for You?!? (Netflix); Let Me Be Me (VOD); Queer for Fear: The History of Queer Horror (Shudder)
Outstanding Current Affairs Documentary	Outstanding Social Issue Documentary
Retrograde (National Geographic); 11 Minutes (Paramount+); Endangered (HBO Max); P.O.V.: "Let the Little Light Shine" (PBS); P.O.V.: "Wuhan Wuhan" (PBS); The Trapped 13: How We Survived The Thai Cave (Netflix)	The Janes (HBO Max); America ReFramed: "Sapelo" (WORLD); CIVIL (Netflix); MSNBC Films: "Model America" (MSNBC); P.O.V.: "Accepted" (PBS)
Outstanding Politics and Government Documentary	Outstanding Business and Economic Documentary
In Her Hands (Netflix); A Radical Life (discovery+); Independent Lens: "Apart" (PBS); P.O.V.: "Not Going Quietly" (PBS); Watergate: High Crimes in the White House (CBS)	P.O.V.: "The Last Out" (PBS); Eat The Rich: The GameStop Saga (Netflix); Icahn: The Restless Billionaire (HBO Max); Independent Lens: "TikTok, Boom." (PBS); Victoria's Secret: Angels and Demons (Hulu)
Outstanding Investigative Documentary	Outstanding Historical Documentary
Escape from Kabul (HBO Max); FIFA Uncovered (Netflix); Flight/Risk (Amazon Prime); I Am Vanessa Guillen (Netflix); P.O.V.: "Delikado" (PBS)	Hostages (HBO Max); CNN Original Series: "Watergate: Blueprint for a Scandal" (CNN); FRONTLINE, Retro Report: "American Reckoning" (PBS); Meltdown: Three Mile Island (Netflix); Waterman - Duke: Ambassador of Aloha (PBS)
Outstanding Science and Technology Documentary	Outstanding Nature Documentary
How to Survive a Pandemic (HBO Max); Earthstorm (Netflix); Good Night Oppy (Amazon Prime); NOVΛ: "Augmented" (PBS); NOVΛ: "Ultimate Space Telescope" (PBS)	Wildcat (Amazon Prime); America the Beautiful (Disney+); Animal (Netflix); The Green Planet (PBS); Kangaroo Valley (Netflix); Super/Natural (National Geographic)
Outstanding Crime and Justice Documentary	Outstanding Short Documentary
MTV Documentary Films: "The Fire That Took Her" (Paramount+); Captive Audience: A Real American Horror Story (Hulu); Hold Your Fire (AMC+); Supreme Team (Showtime); Unveiled: Surviving La Luz Del Mundo (HBO Max)	The Flagmakers (National Geographic); Guardian Documentaries: "Beirut Dreams in Color" (The Guardian); MSNBC Films: "The Sentence of Michael Thompson" (MSNBC); MTV Documentary Films: "As Far as They Can Run" (Paramount+); Op-Docs: "MINK!" (The New York Times)

=== Craft ===
Outstanding Cinematography: Documentary	Outstanding Video Journalism: News
Retrograde – Tim Grucza, Matthew Heineman, Olivier Sarbil (National Geographic); Master of Light (HBO Max); Nuisance Bear (The New Yorker); Op-Docs: "Long Line of Ladies" (The New York Times); Super/Natural (National Geographic)	VICE News Tonight: "The Price of Purity: Inside the Wellness Industry's Controversial Supply Chains" – Javier Manzano, Michael Onyiego, Philip Pendlebury (Vice); 60 Minutes: "Return to Gorongosa" (CBS); VICE News Tonight: "Battle for Bakhmut" (Vice); VICE News Tonight: "Inside an Armed Bank Raid in Lebanon" (Vice); VICE News Tonight: "Mafia Land" (Vice)
Outstanding Direction: News	Outstanding Direction: Documentary
Live from the Capitol: January 6, One Year Later – Reza Baktar (CNN); ABC News Soul of a Nation Presents: "Election Night 2022" (ABC); ABC News Soul of a Nation Presents: "PRIDE: To Be Seen" (ABC); CBS Saturday Morning: "David Byrne's American Utopia" (CBS); Soul of a Nation Presents: "X / o n e r a t e d – The Murder of Malcolm X and 55 Years to Justice" (ABC)	The Janes – Tia Lessin, Emma Pildes (HBO Max); In Her Hands (Netflix); Master of Light (HBO Max); Nothing Compares (Showtime); Retrograde (National Geographic); Wildcat (Amazon Prime)
Outstanding Editing: News	Outstanding Editing: Documentary
Caught on Camera, Traced by Phone: The Russian Military Unit That Killed Dozens in Bucha – Alexander Cardia, Dmitriy Khavin, Natalie Reneau (The New York Times); Trafficked with Mariana van Zeller: "Cocaine Queens" (National Geographic); Trafficked with Mariana van Zeller: "White Supremacy" (National Geographic); VICE News Tonight: "Battle for the South of Ukraine" (Vice); VICE News Tonight: "Beyond Fentanyl" (Vice)	Retrograde – Pablo Garza, Matthew Heineman, Grace Zahrah, Andy Gersh, Jim Hession, David Zieff (National Geographic); CNN Films: "Roadrunner: A Film About Anthony Bourdain" (CNN); In Her Hands (Netflix); Lowndes County and the Road to Black Power (Peacock); Master of Light (HBO Max)
Outstanding Graphic Design and Art Direction: News	Outstanding Graphic Design and Art Direction: Documentary
As Equals: "The Dangers of Mercury in Skin Whitening Products Explained" – Elisa Solinas, Emma Beinis, Jue Gong, Agne Jurkenaite (CNN); America's Morning Headquarters: "Resilience and Adaptation 40 Years into the Future" (The Weather Channel); CNN Digital: "From HRH to Consort, CNN Explains how British Royal Titles Work" (CNN); A Fact-Checked Debate About Legal Weed (Vox); VICE News Tonight: "Mafia Land" (Vice); VICE News Tonight: "Queer Kabul" (Vice); Winter Sports Week (Vox)	A Trip to Infinity – Jon Halperin, Drew Takahashi, Colin Thorton, Neil Wilson, Raven Kwok, Gordon Clark, Henrik Reistad, Dimitrios Sakkas, Susi Sie, Christian Stangl Stangl, Grant Sanderson, Rebecka Taule, Pasquale D'Amico, Adrianna Dufay, Florian Grolig, Jimbo Matison, Mac Premo, Henrik Reistad, Gergely Wootsch, Tadju Takahashi (Netflix); Good Night Oppy (Amazon Prime); How to Change Your Mind (Netflix); Lincoln's Dilemma (Apple TV+); The Principles of Pleasure (Netflix)
Outstanding Research: News	Outstanding Research: Documentary
VICE News Tonight: "Undercover in Guyana" – Mr. Chan, Belle Cushing, Xiao Ge, Isobel Yeung (Vice); CNN Newsroom: "The Killing of Shireen Abu Akleh" (CNN); FRONTLINE: "Afghanistan Undercover" (PBS); FRONTLINE: "Crime Scene: Bucha" (PBS); The Situation Room with Wolf Blitzer: "Horror at Kabul's Abbey Gate" (CNN); The New York Times Opinion Video: "The Taliban Promised Them Amnesty. Then They Executed Them" (The New York Times); Trafficked with Mariana van Zeller: "White Supremacy" (National Geographic)	Lowndes County and the Road to Black Power – Dema Paxton Fofang, Anya Rous, Lizzy McGlynn (Peacock); 37 Words (ESPN); FRONTLINE: "Putin's Attack on Ukraine: Documenting War Crimes" (PBS); Hostages (HBO Max); The Janes (HBO Max); The U.S. and the Holocaust (PBS)
Outstanding Lighting Direction and Scenic Design	Outstanding Technical Achievement
The Pez Outlaw – Britton Foster, Amy Bandlien Storkel, David Pink, Lauren Schilling, Bryan Storkel, Chad Miller (VOD); ABC News Studios: "Wild Crime: Murder in Yosemite" (Hulu); CNN Original Series: "The Murdochs: Empire of Influence" (CNN); Homicide Hunter: Never Give Up: ""(Investigation Discovery); Inside the Mind of a Con Artist (Curiosity Stream)	NBC News Election Coverage – Marc Greenstein, Margot Silver, Mike Masek, Alex Bassett, Ilya Livshits, Rob Barton, Ted Natoli, Nini Li, Miguel Yabredes, Wilson Li, Jean Boucklos, Andrew Mannino, Morgan Herrmann, Barry Herzner, Mahe Dewan, James Matarese, Jeff Taylor (NBC); Live from the Capitol: January 6th, One Year Later (CNN); NBC News Election Coverage: "Decision 2022 Midterm Elections" (NBC); New Media Element Builder (CNN); Noticiero Telemundo: "Decision 2022: Battle for the Power" (Telemundo)
Outstanding Music Composition	Outstanding Sound
CNN Films: "Julia" – Rachel Portman (CNN); Body Parts (Starz); Exposing Muybridge (VOD); Good Night Oppy (Amazon Prime); Wildcat (Amazon Prime)	Good Night Oppy – Dave Whitehead, Greg Hayes, Mark Mangini, Tim Watson, Eric Basta, Charlie Campagna, Dave Bach (Amazon Prime); A Trip to Infinity (Netflix); Great Performances: "Now Hear This" (PBS); Nuisance Bear (The New Yorker); Our Universe (Netflix); Retrograde (National Geographic); Super/Natural (National Geographic)
Outstanding Writing: News	Outstanding Writing: Documentary
60 Minutes: "The Lost Souls of Bucha" – Maria Gavrilovic, Alex Ortiz, Scott Pelley (CBS); 60 Minutes: "Pathogen X" (CBS); 60 Minutes: "Platform 4" (CBS); Fault Lines: "The Killing of Shireen Abu Akleh" (Al Jazeera International USA); Trafficked with Mariana van Zeller: "Cocaine Queens" (National Geographic); Trafficked with Mariana van Zeller: "Fish Pirates" (National Geographic)	Good Night Oppy – Ryan Whie, Helen Kearns (Amazon Prime); FRONTLINE: "Lies, Politics and Democracy" (PBS); Hostages (HBO Max); Nothing Compares (Showtime); P.O.V.: "Not Going Quietly" (PBS)
Outstanding Interactive Media	Outstanding Promotional Announcement
How We Went Inside the Apocalyptic Worldview of 'Tucker Carlson Tonight' (The New York Times); CNN Digital: "How Iran's Security Forces Use Rape to Quell Protests" (CNN); The DJ and the War Crimes (Rolling Stone); Extreme Heat Will Change Us (The New York Times); 'Putin Is a Fool': Intercepted Calls Reveal Russian Army in Disarray (The New York Times)	Super/Natural (National Geographic); Captive Audience: A Real American Horror Story: "Captive Audience "Shocking" Trailer" (Hulu); NOVΛ: "Augmented" (PBS); Retrograde (National Geographic); Shark Week: "Seal Cam / Shark Week 2022" (Discovery Channel)

=== Regional News ===
Outstanding Regional News Story: Spot or Breaking News	Outstanding Regional News Story: Investigative Report
Hurricane Ida – Bun Choum, Meghan Thomas, Amanda Valdin, Aubry Killion, Margaret Orr, Lee Southwick, Sula Kim, Travers Mackel, Chad Sabadie, Gina Swanson, Romni Williams, Erin Lowrey (WDSU-TV – New Orleans, Louisiana); Arabi Tornado (WDSU-TV – New Orleans, Louisiana); The Caldor Fire: The Race to Save Tahoe (KXTV ABC10 – Sacramento, California); NBC 10 Philadelphia: "Breaking News Coverage of Severe Weather" (WCAU-TV – Philadelphia, Pennsylvania); Tragedy at Robb Elementary (KENS-TV – San Antonio, Texas)	Eyewitness News at 10: "The Man Behind the Warehouse" – Derek Waldrip, Katie Moore (WWL-TV – New Orleans, Louisiana); ABC15 News at 10: "Adopted, Abused, and Abandoned: Uncovering a Years-Long Failure to Protect Children" (KNXV-TV – Phoenix, Arizona); KING 5 News: "COVID Exemptions for a Price" (KING-TV – Seattle, Washington); KXTV ABC10: "Fire - Power - Money: How Governor Gavin Newsom Protected PG&E" (KXTV – Sacramento, California); The Reveal: "Terminal" (WXIA 11Alive – Atlanta, Georgia)

=== International News & Current Affairs ===
News	Current Affairs
The Battle for Bucha & Irpin (United Kingdom) (Sky News); Jornal Nacional and Fantástico: "The Murder of Bruno and Dom" (Brazil) (Globo); Shireen Abu Akleh's Killing (Qatar) (Al Jazeera English); TV4 Nyheterna: "Beyond Enemy Lines" (Sweden) (TV4 News)	Off the Grid: "Ukraine Wartime Diaries" (Turkey) (TRT World); Exposure: "The Crossing" (United Kingdom) (David Modell Productions); GloboNews Documentary: "Shelter: Innocents Under Fire" (Brazil) (GloboNews / Globo); UVDA: "Last Stop Before Kyiv" (Israel) (I.D UVDA / Keshet Media Group)

== Multiple wins ==
Shows that received multiple wins
Wins	Program	Network
8	VICE News Tonight	Vice
3	60 Minutes	CBS
3	Anderson Cooper 360°	CNN
3	The Janes	HBO Max
3	Retrograde	National Geographic
2	Live from the Capitol: January 6th, One Year Later	CNN
2	Good Night Oppy	Amazon Prime
2	MTV Documentary Films	Paramount+

Wins by Network
Wins	Network
10	CNN
9	Vice
6	HBO Max
5	The New York Times
5	National Geographic
4	CBS
3	Univision
3	Amazon Prime
2	PBS
2	Netflix
2	Paramount+

== Multiple nominations ==
Shows that received multiple nominations
Nominations	Program	Network
28	VICE News Tonight	Vice
11	60 Minutes	CBS
9	FRONTLINE	PBS
9	Trafficked with Mariana van Zeller	National Geographic
8	Nightline	ABC
7	Anderson Cooper 360°	CNN
7	P.O.V.	PBS
6	Retrograde	National Geographic
6	Good Night Oppy	Amazon Prime
6	Noticiero Telemundo	Telemundo
5	ABC News Soul of a Nation Presents	ABC
5	The New York Times Opinion Video	The New York Times
4	CNN Films	CNN
4	The Situation Room with Wolf Blitzer	CNN
4	Super/Natural	National Geographic
4	The Janes	HBO Max
3	Live from the Capitol: January 6th, One Year Later	CNN
3	CNN Digital	CNN
3	NOVΛ	PBS
3	CBS Mornings	CBS
3	In Her Hands	Netflix
3	Hostages	HBO Max
3	Master of Light	HBO Max
3	Op-Docs	The New York Times
3	Dateline NBC	NBC
3	NBC News Specials	NBC
3	Aquí y Ahora	Univision
3	Noticiero Univision	Univision
3	Wildcat	Amazon Prime
3	MTV Documentary Films	Paramount+
2	CNN Original Series	CNN
2	CNN Worldwide	CNN
2	Erin Burnett OutFront	CNN
2	State of the Union with Jake Tapper	CNN
2	20/20	ABC
2	ABC News	ABC
2	ABC News Live	ABC
2	This Week with George Stephanopoulos	ABC
2	Great Performances	PBS
2	Independent Lens	PBS
2	CBS Sunday Morning	CBS
2	A Trip to Infinity	Netflix
2	Escape from Kabul	HBO Max
2	Caught on Camera, Traced by Phone: The Russian Military Unit That Killed Dozens in Bucha	The New York Times
2	NBC News Election Coverage	NBC
2	TODAY	NBC
2	MSNBC Films	MSNBC
2	Nothing Compares	Showtime
2	Fault Lines	Al Jazeera International USA
2	BBC World News America	BBC World News
2	In Real Life	Newsy
2	Nuisance Bear	The New Yorker
2	Lowndes County and the Road to Black Power	Peacock

Nominations by Network
Nominations	Network
45	CNN
30	Vice
28	ABC
26	PBS
20	CBS
20	National Geographic
18	Netflix
16	HBO Max
16	The New York Times
15	NBC
14	Univision
10	Amazon Prime
8	Telemundo
5	MSNBC
4	Hulu
4	Paramount+
4	Showtime
3	Al Jazeera International USA
3	VOD
2	BBC World News
2	CNN en Español
2	ESPN
2	Newsy
2	The New Yorker
2	Peacock
2	ViX
2	Vox
2	WORLD
