= 20th Producers Guild of America Awards =

20th Annual Producers Guild Awards
- Date: January 24, 2009
- Location: Hollywood Palladium, Hollywood, California
- Country: United States
- Presented by: Producers Guild of America

Highlights
- Best Producer(s) Motion Picture: Slumdog Millionaire – Christian Colson
- Best Producer(s) Animated Feature: WALL-E – Jim Morris
- Best Producer(s) Documentary Motion Picture: Man on Wire – Simon Chinn

The 20th Producers Guild of America Awards (also known as 2009 Producers Guild Awards), honoring the best film and television producers of 2008, were held at Hollywood Palladium in Hollywood, California on January 24, 2009. The nominations were announced on December 10, 2008, and January 5, 2009.

== Winners and nominees ==
=== Film ===
Darryl F. Zanuck Award for Outstanding Producer of Theatrical Motion Pictures
- Slumdog Millionaire – Christian Colson
  - The Curious Case of Benjamin Button – Kathleen Kennedy, Frank Marshall, and Ceán Chaffin
  - The Dark Knight – Christopher Nolan, Emma Thomas, and Charles Roven
  - Frost/Nixon – Ron Howard, Brian Grazer, and Eric Fellner
  - Milk – Bruce Cohen and Dan Jinks
Outstanding Producer of Animated Theatrical Motion Pictures
- WALL-E – Jim Morris
  - Bolt – Clark Spencer
  - Kung Fu Panda – Melissa Cobb
Outstanding Producer of Documentary Theatrical Motion Pictures
- Man on Wire – Simon Chinn
  - Standard Operating Procedure – Julie Ahlberg and Errol Morris
  - Trouble the Water – Carl Deal and Tia Lessin

=== Television ===
Norman Felton Award for Outstanding Producer of Episodic Television, Drama
- Mad Men
  - Boston Legal
  - Damages
  - Dexter
  - Lost
Danny Thomas Award for Outstanding Producer of Episodic Television, Comedy
- 30 Rock
  - Curb Your Enthusiasm
  - Entourage
  - The Office
  - Weeds
David L. Wolper Award for Outstanding Producer of Long-Form Television
- John Adams
  - 24: Redemption
  - Bernard and Doris
  - A Raisin in the Sun
  - Recount
Outstanding Producer of Non-Fiction Television
- 60 Minutes
  - Deadliest Catch
  - Frontline
  - Kathy Griffin: My Life on the D-List
  - This American Life
Outstanding Producer of Live Entertainment & Competition Television
- The Colbert Report
  - The Amazing Race
  - Project Runway
  - Real Time with Bill Maher
  - Top Chef

=== David O. Selznick Achievement Award in Theatrical Motion Pictures ===
- Michael Douglas

=== Milestone Award ===
- Brian Grazer and Ron Howard

=== Norman Lear Achievement Award in Television ===
- David Chase

=== Stanley Kramer Award ===
Awarded to the motion picture that best illuminates social issues.

- Milk

=== Vanguard Award ===
Awarded in recognition of outstanding achievement in new media and technology.

- Chris DeWolfe and Tom Anderson

=== Visionary Award ===
Honored to a producer exemplifying unique or uplifting quality.

- Jeff Skoll
