= A Trip to Infinity =

2022 documentary film

- Directed by: Jonathan Halperin; Drew Takahashi
- Written by: Jonathan Halperin; Alex Ricciardi
- Distributed by: Netflix
- Release date: 2022
- Running time: 79 minutes
- Country: United States
- Language: English

A Trip to Infinity is a 2022 Netflix documentary film directed by Jonathan Halperin and Drew Takahashi, in their feature length debut, which explores the concept of infinity through interviews with mathematicians, physicists and philosophers around the world.

== Cast ==
- Alan Lightman as himself
- Brian Greene as himself
- Stephon Alexander as himself
- Steven Strogatz as himself
- Eugenia Cheng as herself
- Rebecca Newberger Goldstein as herself
- Delilah Gates as herself
- Anthony Aguirre as himself
- Moon Duchin as herself
- Carlo Rovelli as himself
- Kenny Easwaran as himself
- Janna Levin as herself
- Sasha Wong Halperin as voice of the Numbers
- Jon Halperin as himself

== Awards ==
The movie won an award for Outstanding Graphic Design and Art Direction at the 44th News and Documentary Emmy Awards. Animation studios receiving the Emmy include Compost Creative and Studio AKA.
