= Nothing Compares (film) =

2022 documentary film

- Directed by: Kathryn Ferguson
- Written by: Eleanor Emptage, Kathryn Ferguson, Michael Mallie
- Produced by: Eleanor Emptage, Michael Mallie
- Cinematography: Luke Jacobs
- Edited by: Mick Mahon
- Music by: Irene Buckley, Linda Buckley
- Distributed by: Showtime Documentary Films; Paramount Pictures
- Release date: 21 January 2022 (SFF)
- Running time: 97 minutes
- Countries: United Kingdom; Ireland
- Language: English

Nothing Compares is a 2022 documentary feature film, directed by Kathryn Ferguson. It looks at the life and legacy of Irish singer Sinéad O'Connor, focusing on the years 1987–1993.

The film had its world premiere at the 2022 Sundance Film Festival on 21 January 2022, after which it was acquired by Showtime Documentary Films. The film was theatrically released in the UK and Ireland by Paramount International on 7 October 2022.

== Synopsis ==
Nothing Compares is the story of Sinéad O'Connor's phenomenal rise to worldwide fame and how her iconoclastic personality resulted in her exile from the pop mainstream. Focusing on her prophetic words and deeds from 1987–1993, the film reflects on the legacy of this fearless trailblazer through a contemporary feminist lens.

== Production ==
The film is a UK and Ireland co-production, produced by Eleanor Emptage and Michael Mallie, and made with support from Field of Vision, Screen Ireland, BFI Doc Society Fund, Northern Ireland Screen and ie:entertainment.

== Release and reception ==
Nothing Compares had its world premiere at the 2022 Sundance Film Festival on 21 January 2022 in the World Cinema Documentary Competition. It toured the festival circuit picking up multiple awards, including Best Documentary Feature at the 2022 Galway Film Fleadh. On 1 February 2022, Showtime Documentary Films announced that it has acquired worldwide rights to Nothing Compares. The film premiered on Showtime on 30 September 2022. It was released in theatres in the UK and Ireland on 7 October 2022.

=== Critical response ===
Nothing Compares received positive reviews from film critics in the US, the UK and Ireland. On Rotten Tomatoes, it has a 99% approval rating based on reviews from 83 critics. The website's critical consensus reads: "A moving look at Sinéad O'Connor's remarkable life and career, Nothing Compares is enriching viewing whether or not you're a fan of her work."

The Guardian's film critic Peter Bradshaw gave it 4/5 stars, describing it as "a bracing guide to a brilliant individual who declined to conform." The Telegraph's Chief Music Critic Neil McCormack gave it 5/5 stars, describing it as "the most potent film about the travails of a woman in the pop industry since Asif Kapadia's 2016 Oscar-winning Amy".

=== Accolades ===
On 4 December 2022, Nothing Compares received two British Independent Film Awards: Best Debut Director – Feature Documentary for Kathryn Ferguson, and Best Documentary. In May 2023, it won the George Morrison Feature Documentary Award at the 19th Irish Film & Television Awards.

Award	Date of ceremony	Category	Recipient(s)	Result	Reference
Sundance Film Festival	30 January 2022	World Cinema Documentary Competition	Nothing Compares	Nominated	
Dock of the Bay	7 May 2022	Feature Film Audience Prize	Kathryn Ferguson, Eleanor Emptage, Michael Mallie	Won	
Millennium Docs Against Gravity	19 May 2022	The Chopin's Nose Award	Kathryn Ferguson	Won	
Doc Edge Film Festival	22 June 2022	Thank You for the Music	Kathryn Ferguson, Eleanor Emptage, Michael Mallie	Won	
Galway Film Fleadh	10 July 2022	Best Irish Documentary	Kathryn Ferguson, Eleanor Emptage, Michael Mallie	Won	
Docs Ireland	11 July 2022	Audience Award - Best Documentary	Kathryn Ferguson, Eleanor Emptage, Michael Mallie	Won	
Aegean Film Festival	16 July 2022	Audience Award - Best Documentary	Kathryn Ferguson, Eleanor Emptage, Michael Mallie	Won	
Jecheon International Music and Film Festival	16 August 2022	International Competition	Kathryn Ferguson, Eleanor Emptage, Michael Mallie	Nominated	
Edinburgh International Film Festival	24 August 2022	The Powell & Pressburger Award for Best Feature Film	Kathryn Ferguson, Eleanor Emptage, Michael Mallie	Nominated	
Critics' Choice Documentary Awards	13 November 2022	Best Archival Documentary	Nothing Compares	Nominated	
Critics' Choice Documentary Awards	13 November 2022	Best Music Documentary	Nothing Compares	Nominated	
British Independent Film Awards	4 December 2022	Best Debut Director – Feature Documentary	Kathryn Ferguson	Won	
British Independent Film Awards	4 December 2022	British Independent Film Award for Best Documentary	Kathryn Ferguson, Eleanor Emptage, Michael Mallie	Won	
British Independent Film Awards	4 December 2022	Best Editing	Mick Mahon	Nominated	
International Documentary Association Awards	10 December 2022	Best Music Documentary	Kathryn Ferguson, Eleanor Emptage, Michael Mallie	Nominated	
Cinema Eye Honors	13 January 2023	Outstanding Debut	Kathryn Ferguson	Nominated	
Cinema Eye Honors	13 January 2023	Audience Choice Prize	Kathryn Ferguson	Nominated	
Cinema Eye Honors	13 January 2023	The Unforgettables (Non-Competitive Honor)	Sinéad O'Connor	Won	
Cinema Eye Honors	13 January 2023	Outstanding Original Score	Linda Buckley, Irene Buckley	Nominated	
Girls on Film Awards	23 February 2023	Best Documentary	Kathryn Ferguson, Eleanor Emptage, Michael Mallie	Won	
British Film Editors Cut Above Awards	24 February 2023	Best Edited British Documentary or Non-Fiction Programme	Mick Mahon	Nominated	
Producers Guild of America Awards	25 February 2023	Outstanding Producer of Documentary Theatrical Motion Pictures	Eleanor Emptage, Michael Mallie	Nominated	
Irish Film & Television Awards	7 May 2023	Best Feature Documentary	Kathryn Ferguson, Eleanor Emptage, Michael Mallie	Won	
Irish Film & Television Awards	7 May 2023	Best Original Music	Linda Buckley, Irene Buckley	Nominated	
Irish Film & Television Awards	7 May 2023	Best Editing	Mick Mahon	Nominated	
44th News and Documentary Emmy Awards	29 September 2023	Outstanding Direction: Documentary	Kathryn Ferguson	Nominated	
44th News and Documentary Emmy Awards	29 September 2023	Outstanding Writing: Documentary	Kathryn Ferguson, Eleanor Emptage, Michael Mallie	Nominated	
