= The Shadow of Hate =

1994 film

- Directed by: Charles Guggenheim
- Written by: Charles Guggenheim
- Produced by: Kary Antholis; Tia Lessin
- Narrated by: Julian Bond
- Edited by: Catherine Shields
- Distributed by: Southern Poverty Law Center
- Release date: June 16, 1995
- Running time: 40 minutes
- Country: United States
- Language: English

The Shadow of Hate is a 1995 American short documentary film about racism directed by Charles Guggenheim.

== Summary ==
The film expresses the history of oppression, discrimination, violence and hate in America.

== Accolades ==
It was nominated for an Academy Award for Best Documentary Short.
