= Steal This Story, Please! =

2025 documentary film about Amy Goodman

- Theatrical release poster
- Directed by: Carl Deal; Tia Lessin
- Produced by: Carl Deal; Tia Lessin; Karen Ranucci; Diana Cohn; Caren Spruch
- Starring: Amy Goodman; Juan González; Jeremy Scahill; David Isay; Nermeen Shaikh; Sharif Abdel Kouddous; Zazu
- Cinematography: Cliff Charles; Nausheen Dadabhoy; Julia Dengel; Keith Walker
- Edited by: Mona Davis
- Music by: Zoë Keating
- Production company: Xceptional Communications
- Distributed by: Xceptional Communications, Elsewhere Films
- Release dates: June 12, 2025 (DC/DOX film festival); May 10, 2026 (United States)
- Running time: 98 minutes
- Country: United States
- Language: English
- Box office: $1 million

Steal This Story, Please! is a 2025 American documentary film which explores the life and career of independent investigative journalist Amy Goodman and her work on the news program Democracy Now!. It was directed by Tia Lessin and Carl Deal. The film had its world premiere at the DC/DOX film festival in Washington, D.C. on June 12, 2025.

== Cast ==
- Amy Goodman
- Juan González
- Jeremy Scahill
- David Isay
- Nermeen Shaikh
- Sharif Abdel Kouddous
- Zazu

== Synopsis ==
Steal This Story, Please! is a documentary film about the life and career of independent investigative journalist Amy Goodman, in particular her work on the news program Democracy Now!.

== Production ==
The film was directed by Oscar-nominated, Emmy Awards-winning filmmakers Tia Lessin and Carl Deal. Lessin and Deal also produced the film, along with Karen Ranucci, Diana Cohn, and Caren Spruch. Cliff Charles was responsible for cinematography, while Mona Davis edited the film. The score is by Canadian composer and cellist Zoë Keating.

According to Goodman, the title "is a promise", because reporting by Democracy Now! is not proprietary: ""We want the world to hear the stories of people on the ground who are risking their lives". She has talked about how her Jewish background has informed her work: "never again means never again for anyone anywhere, and my attitude about covering Palestine, in Gaza and the West Bank, and what's happening with Israel today is because of my Jewish education, not in spite of it". She says that Democracy Now! is for people who care about the climate crisis and all types of social justice around the world.

Musician and political activist Tom Morello, as well as actresses and political activists Jane Fonda and Rosario Dawson, are among the executive producers.

The film runs for 98 minutes.

== Release ==
For its world premiere, Steal This Story, Please! opened the DC/DOX film festival in Washington, D.C. on June 12, 2025. The international premiere took place on November 15, 2025, at the International Documentary Film Festival Amsterdam. In both instances, the screening was followed by an in-person discussion involving Goodman, Deal, and Lessin about the importance of independent journalism.

Steal This Story, Please! has been screened at many US film festivals, including the 52nd Telluride Film Festival on August 31, 2025, and in the True Stories section of the 37th Palm Springs International Film Festival on January 3, 2026, as well as international film festivals, including the Adelaide Film Festival, Australia, on October 18, 2026.

Its US theatrical release was on May 10, 2026.. It is to be released in Australian cinemas from October 22, 2026.

== Reception ==
=== Critical response ===
On the review aggregator website Rotten Tomatoes, 97% of 32 critics' reviews are positive. The critics' consensus reads: "With its compelling portrait of Amy Goodman's relentless commitment to reporting from the perspective of ordinary people, Steal This Story, Please! makes an urgent case for independent journalism as a necessity for a healthy democracy." Metacritic, which uses a weighted average, assigned the film a score of 71 out of 100, based on six critics, indicating "generally favorable" reviews.

=== Accolades ===
| Award | Date of ceremony | Category | Recipient(s) | Result | Ref. |
|---|---|---|---|---|---|
| Cinema for Peace Awards | 16 February 2026 | Cinema for Peace Dove for The Most Valuable Documentary of the Year | Steal This Story, Please! | Nominated | |
| Mill Valley International Film Festival | September 2025 | Winner: Audience Favorite, Mind the Gap | Steal This Story, Please! | Winner | |
| Seattle Intl Film Festival DocFest | October 2025 | Audience Award, Best Documentary Film | Steal This Story, Please! | Winner | |
| Woodstock Film Festival | October 2025 | Audience Award, Best Documentary Film | Steal This Story, Please! | Winner | |
| Santa Fe Intl Film Festival | October, 2025 | Special Jury Award, Documentary Feature | Steal This Story, Please! | Winner | |
| Santa Fe Intl Film Festival | November, 2025 | Audience Choice, Best Documentary Feature | Steal This Story, Please! | Winner | |
| St Louis Intl Film Festival | November, 2025 | Audience Choice Award: Best Documentary Film | Steal This Story, Please! | Winner | |
| Hamptons Docfest | December 2025 | Audience Award | Steal This Story, Please! | Winner | |
| Palm Springs International Film Festival | January 2026 | Audience Award | Steal This Story, Please! | Winner | |
| Hindsight Film Festival | January 2026 | Best Feature Film | Steal This Story, Please! | Winner | |
| | | Best Use of Personal Perspective | | Winner | |
| Human Film Festival | January 2026 | Best Documentary Film | Steal This Story, Please! | Winner | |
| Santa Barbara Film Festival | February 2026 | Audience Award | Steal This Story, Please! | Winner | |
| Santa Barbara Film Festival | February 2026 | The Fund for Santa Barbara Social Justice Award | Steal This Story, Please! | Winner | |
| Cleveland Film Festival | April 2026 | Greg Gund Memorial Standing Up Competition | Steal This Story, Please! | Winner | |
| Jewish Film Institute | July 2026 | Harvey Goldberg Award | Steal This Story, Please! | Winner | |
| Pittsburgh Jewish Film Festival | May 2026 | Audience Award | Steal This Story, Please! | Winner | |
| Mendocino Film Festival | June 2026 | Audience Award | Steal This Story, Please! | Winner | |
