= Retrograde (2022 American film) =

2022 documentary film by Matthew Heineman

- Theatrical release poster
- Directed by: Matthew Heineman
- Produced by: Matthew Heineman; Caitlin McNally
- Cinematography: Timothy Grucza; Matthew Heineman; Olivier Sarbil
- Edited by: Pablo Garza; Matthew Heineman; Grace Zahrah
- Music by: H. Scott Salinas
- Production companies: National Geographic Documentary Films; Our Time Projects
- Distributed by: Picturehouse
- Release dates: September 3, 2022 (Telluride); November 11, 2022 (United States)
- Running time: 96 minutes
- Country: United States
- Language: English
- Box office: $8,673

Retrograde is a 2022 American documentary film directed by Matthew Heineman that covers events that took place during the final nine months of America's 20-year war in Afghanistan. It had its U.S. premiere at the Telluride Film Festival on September 3, 2022, and had its Canadian debut at the Vancouver International Film Festival on October 2, 2022. It was released in select theaters in the United States starting November 11, 2022, by National Geographic Documentary Films and Picturehouse and was later made available on various streaming platforms.

The film received critical acclaim and won an Edward R. Murrow Award, three News and Documentary Emmy Awards (from six nominations), and an award at the documentary film festival Doc NYC. Heinemann was nominated for the Directors Guild of America Award for Outstanding Directorial Achievement in Documentaries at the 75th Directors Guild of America Awards, and together with fellow producer Caitlin McNally, he was also nominated for the Producers Guild of America Award for Outstanding Producer of Documentary Theatrical Motion Pictures at the 34th Producers Guild of America Awards.

The film has faced criticism for failing to adequately protect the identities of its subjects leading to the death of a protagonist.

== Synopsis ==
Retrograde is a 2022 American documentary film that covers events that took place during the final nine months of the United States' 20-year war in Afghanistan. The film includes actions taken by the last American Special Forces units stationed there, Sami Sadat, a young Afghan general and his troops defending their country, and a chaotic exodus of its civilians, desperate to flee a country that will once again be controlled by the Taliban.

== Release ==
Retrograde premiered in the United States on September 3, 2022, at the Telluride Film Festival. It had its Canadian premiere at the Vancouver International Film Festival on October 2, 2022.

Picturehouse released the film in select US cities on November 11 in New York City and Washington, D.C., and in Los Angeles, San Francisco, San Diego, and Colorado Springs on November 18.

The film began streaming in the US on National Geographic Channel on December 8, on Disney+ on December 9, and on Hulu on December 11. It was released on Disney+ (Canada) on Friday January 13, 2023.

== Reception ==
=== Critical response ===
Retrograde was generally well received. Nicolas Rapold writes in The New York Times, "The Taliban takeover suggests a reply to the famous 1984 National Geographic cover — as if history is repeating itself with fresh suffering." In posting about the Green Beret working alongside the Afghans, Sheila O'Malley publishes for the film review site RogerEbert.com, "The intimacy between the men is one of the most striking things about Retrograde." In Variety, Peter Debruge declares that the film "brings back hi-def vérité footage that looks sharper and more artfully framed than most Hollywood features."

On the review aggregator website Rotten Tomatoes, 93% of 30 critics' reviews are positive, with an average rating of 8.0/10. Metacritic, which uses a weighted average, assigned the film a score of 75 out of 100, based on 11 critics, indicating "generally favorable" reviews.

=== Accolades ===
In addition to the accolades listed below, Retrograde was one of the 15 films shortlisted for the Academy Award for Best Documentary Feature Film, but was ultimately not selected as one of the five final nominees.

Award	Date of ceremony	Category	Recipient(s)	Result	Ref.
Critics' Choice Documentary Awards	November 13, 2022	Best Political Documentary	Retrograde	Nominated	
Directors Guild of America Awards	February 18, 2023	Outstanding Directorial Achievement in Documentaries	Matthew Heineman	Nominated	
Doc NYC	November 9–27, 2022	Short List: Features – Producing Award	Matthew Heineman and Caitlin McNally	Won	
Edward R. Murrow Award	October 9, 2023	Feature Documentary	National Geographic	Won	
Montclair Film Festival	October 21–30, 2022	Bruce Sinofsky Award for Documentary Feature	Retrograde	Nominated	
Producers Guild of America Awards	February 25, 2023	Outstanding Producer of Documentary Theatrical Motion Pictures	Matthew Heineman and Caitlin McNally	Nominated	
News and Documentary Emmy Awards	September 28, 2023	Outstanding Current Affairs Documentary	Retrograde	Won	
News and Documentary Emmy Awards	September 28, 2023	Outstanding Cinematography: Documentary	Retrograde	Won	
News and Documentary Emmy Awards	September 28, 2023	Outstanding Direction: Documentary	Retrograde	Nominated	
News and Documentary Emmy Awards	September 28, 2023	Outstanding Editing: Documentary	Retrograde	Won	
News and Documentary Emmy Awards	September 28, 2023	Outstanding Sound	Retrograde	Nominated	
News and Documentary Emmy Awards	September 28, 2023	Outstanding Promotional Announcement	Retrograde	Nominated	

== Death of Afghan subject ==
The film faced criticism for failing to adequately protect the identities of its subjects. The filmmakers made the decision to show close-ups of them despite warnings prior to Retrograde’s release from at least three active-duty U.S. military personnel and two former Green Berets saying the film would put Afghan subjects in danger, with one speculating that the film could be a "hit list" for the Taliban.

In 2024 one of the Afghan subjects of the film was arrested and tortured by the Taliban and later died from his injuries. The Taliban have said that they found him through Retrograde. A number of Retrograde's subjects are in hiding.

The film's creators have disputed claims that their reporting was unethical. Due to "new attention to this film", National Geographic, which produced the documentary as part of a joint agreement with Disney, announced that it had withdrawn the film, citing "an abundance of caution".

== See also ==
- 2021 Taliban offensive – Military offensive by the Taliban in Afghanistan
- United States invasion of Afghanistan – 2001 multinational military operation
- War in Afghanistan (2001–2021) – U.S Armed conflict in South Asia
