= The Janes =

2022 American documentary film

- Directed by: Tia Lessin; Emma Pildes
- Produced by: Emma Pildes; Daniel Arcana; Jessica Levin
- Distributed by: HBO Max
- Release date: June 8, 2022
- Running time: 101 minutes
- Country: United States
- Language: English

The Janes is a 2022 American documentary film. It premiered at the Sundance Film Festival in January 2022, and was released on HBO Max on June 8, 2022, the month after a leaked draft opinion for Dobbs v. Jackson Women's Health Organization was released, starting protests across the United States. The film was directed by Emma Pildes and Tia Lessin, produced by Emma Pildes, Daniel Arcana, and Jessica Levin, executive produced by Susan Lacy, and edited by Kristen Huntley.

== Summary ==
The Janes tells the story of members of the Jane Collective, a group of women who performed approximately 11,000 abortions in Chicago between 1968 and Roe v. Wade, the landmark Supreme Court decision legalizing abortion in 1973. The film features interviews from several members of the collective.

== Reception ==
The Janes had its world premiere at Sundance Film Festival, its broadcast premiere on HBO, and was on the shortlist for the 95th Academy Awards. The film won Best Documentary, Outstanding Social Issue Documentary, and Outstanding Direction – Documentary at the 44th News and Documentary Emmy Awards. The film was selected by the Alfred I. duPont-Columbia University Awards as one of its 16 Silver Baton winners for excellence in video and audio reporting in 2023. It was also nominated for four Critics Choice Awards and was chosen by DOC NYC for their annual short list in 2022.

On Rotten Tomatoes, the film has an approval rating of 100% based on 66 reviews and an average rating of 8.1/10. The site's critical consensus reads: "Frighteningly timely and powerfully persuasive, The Janes offers a unique opportunity to look back at a pivotal chapter in American history through the eyes of those who helped define it." Metacritic, which uses a weighted average, assigned a score of 81 out of 100 based on 18 critics, indicating "universal acclaim".

Judy Berman of Time called the film "essential viewing for a post-Roe America". Sophie Gilbert of The Atlantic commented that "the lesson from The Janes is that, in the absence of justice and political power, there's enormous potential for collective action." Mark Kennedy of the Associated Press rated the film 3.5 stars out of 4, stating that "Lessin and Pildes do a masterful job of putting the Janes in historical context." Doreen St. Félix of The New Yorker stated that "the palette is sober, and the filmmaking itself is recalcitrant, in service always of its tremendous story."
