= Where to Invade Next =

2015 film by Michael Moore

- Theatrical release poster
- Directed by: Michael Moore
- Written by: Michael Moore
- Produced by: Carl Deal; Tia Lessin; Michael Moore
- Starring: Michael Moore
- Narrated by: Michael Moore
- Cinematography: Richard Rowley; Jayme Roy
- Edited by: Pablo Proenza; Todd Woody Richman; Tyler H. Walk
- Production companies: Dog Eat Dog Films; IMG Films
- Distributed by: Unnamed Tom Quinn/Tim League/Jason Janego company (through Drafthouse Films)
- Release dates: September 10, 2015 (TIFF); December 23, 2015 (United States)
- Running time: 120 minutes
- Country: United States
- Languages: English; Arabic; Finnish; French; German; Italian; Norwegian; Portuguese
- Box office: $4.46 million

Where to Invade Next is a 2015 American documentary film written and directed by Michael Moore. The film, in the style of a travelogue, has Moore spending time in countries such as Italy, France, Finland, Tunisia, Slovenia, Germany, and Portugal where he experiences those countries' alternative methods of dealing with social and economic ills experienced in the United States.

Moore's first film in six years, Where to Invade Next opened on December 23, 2015, in the United States and Canada, in a limited run for one week only in a Los Angeles and New York City theater to qualify for the Oscars. It re-opened on February 12, 2016, across 308 screens. The film received generally positive reviews from critics.

== Synopsis ==
In the film, Moore visits a number of countries and examines aspects of their social policies that he suggests the United States could adopt. He visits Italy, France, Finland, Slovenia, Germany, Portugal, Norway, Tunisia, and Iceland; respectively, the subjects covered are worker benefits, school lunches, early education, college education, worker inclusion, decriminalized drugs, low recidivism, women's health care, and women's inclusion and leadership role in society. These countries and supporting facts are listed on the film's website.

The countries and topics in order of appearance:

- In Italy: labor rights and workers' well-being – paid holiday, paid honeymoon, thirteenth salary, two-hour lunch breaks, paid parental leave, speaking with the executives of Lardini and Claudio Domenicali, the CEO of Ducati
- In France: school meals and sex education
- In Finland: education policy (almost no homework, no standardized testing), speaking with Krista Kiuru, the Finnish Minister of Education. Moore notes that music and poetry have been eliminated in the American K-12 education system.
- In Slovenia: debt-free/tuition-free higher education, speaking with Ivan Svetlik, University of Ljubljana's rector, and Borut Pahor, the President of Slovenia. The University of Ljubljana teaches at least 100 courses in English.
- In Germany: labor rights, co-determination and work–life balance, visiting pencil manufacturer Faber-Castell, and the value of honest, frank national history education, particularly as it relates to Nazi Germany
- In Portugal: May Day, drug policy of Portugal, universal health care, and the abolition of the death penalty
- In Norway: humane prison system, visiting the minimum-security Bastøy Prison and maximum-security Halden Prison, and Norway's response to the 2011 Utøya attacks
- In Tunisia: women's rights, including reproductive health, access to abortion and their role in the Tunisian Revolution and the drafting of the Tunisian Constitution of 2014. Rached Ghannouchi disapproves of compulsory hijab, saying, "The state should not tell women how to dress, or interfere in their lives."
- In Iceland: women in power, speaking with Vigdís Finnbogadóttir, the world's first democratically elected female president; the Best Party with Jón Gnarr being elected Mayor of Reykjavík; the 2008–11 Icelandic financial crisis and the criminal investigation and prosecution of bankers, with special prosecutor Ólafur Hauksson
- The fall of the Berlin Wall

Moore points out at the end that many of these ideas actually originated in the U.S., such as the constitutional ban on cruel and unusual punishment, abolition of the death penalty, the struggle for the eight-hour day and the May Day holiday, the Equal Rights Movement for women, and prosecution of financial fraud during the savings and loan crisis.

== Production ==
According to Moore, the film was produced in secret. It was shot with a small crew and production took place on three continents.

== Release ==
Where to Invade Next premiered at the 2015 Toronto International Film Festival (TIFF) and had its American premiere at the 2015 New York Film Festival on October 2, 2015. At the TIFF, Moore sought a distributor, with Moore "[indicating] that whoever winds up taking the film, it will be positioned for Oscar consideration. As a premiere, it was presented during the TIFF's Special Presentations section.

The film was released on December 23, 2015, in New York and Los Angeles by a distribution label formed by Radius-TWC co-founders Tom Quinn and Jason Janego and Alamo Drafthouse Cinema founder Tim League in order to qualify for the 88th Academy Awards. It then re-opened on February 12, 2016 across 308 screens. The agency William Morris Endeavor is currently looking for an international distributor.

Moore had been busy during activities promoting the film and during election work and being in Flint, Michigan, which is suffering from lead contaminating its water. He got pneumonia, was briefly in the intensive care unit of a New York City hospital, and eventually recovered enough to prepare for release; however, his activities leading up to the film's wide release had to be cancelled so he could get adequate rest.

On April 12, 2016, Moore announced that the film would not be licensed to theaters in North Carolina out of political opposition to the state's Public Facilities Privacy & Security Act.

== Reception ==
The film received positive reviews from critics, including Noel Murray, who wrote:

With Where To Invade Next, though, Moore has made his best film in over a decade, and one that clarifies exactly what his strengths are. If nothing else, watching it helps explain why his clunkier movies (like 2009’s Capitalism: A Love Story) fall so flat.

Review aggregator website Rotten Tomatoes reports that 78% of 169 reviews are positive, with an average rating of 6.7/10. The site's consensus states: "Where to Invade Next finds documentarian Michael Moore approaching progressive politics with renewed—albeit unabashedly one-sided—vigor". On Metacritic, the film holds a 63/100 rating, based on 33 critics, indicating "generally favorable reviews". On December 1, 2015, the film was selected as one of 15 shortlisted for the Academy Award for Best Documentary Feature, but was not ultimately nominated.
