= Kimberly Godwin =

African-American television executive

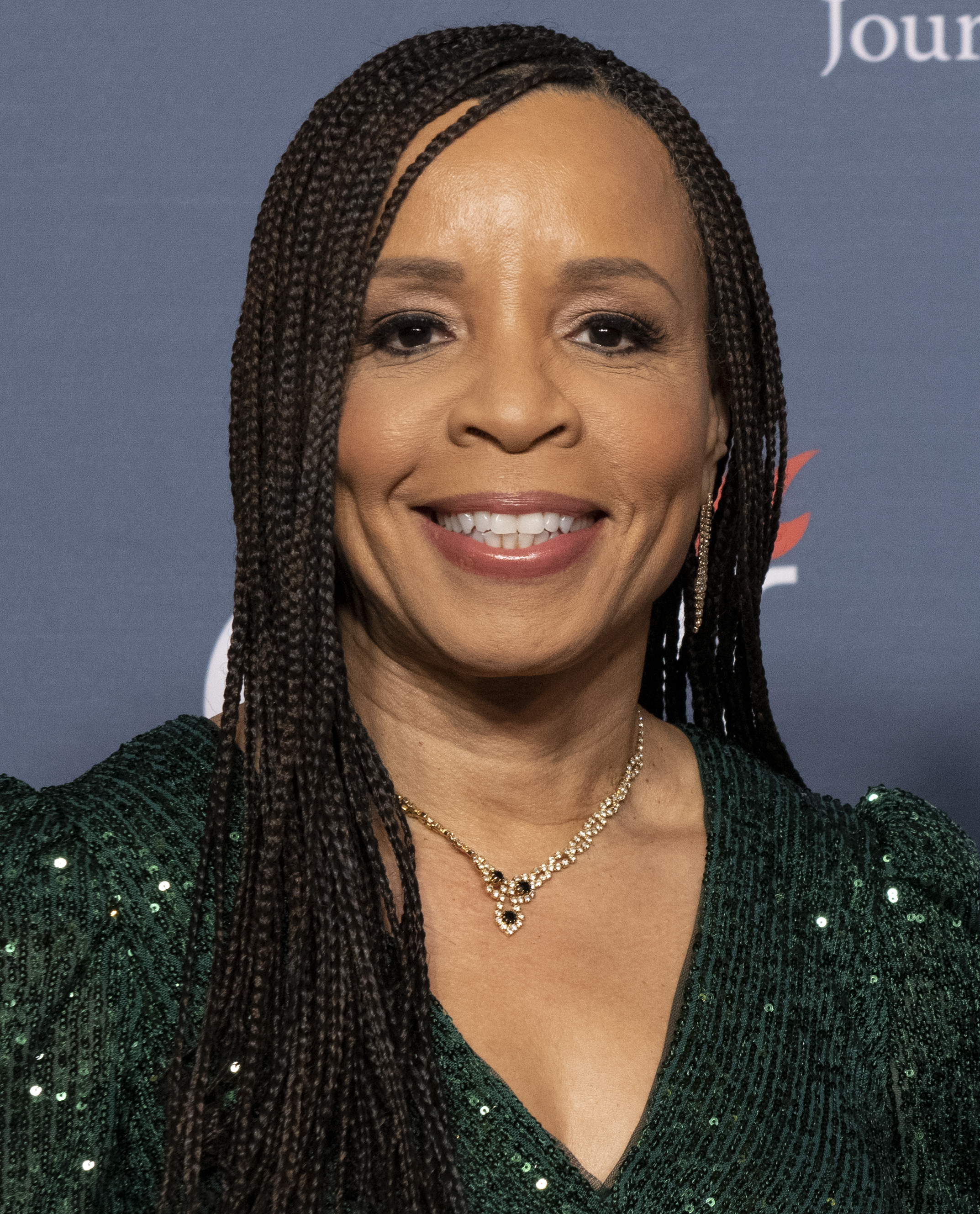
- Godwin in 2022
- Education: Florida A&M University (BA)
- Occupations: Network executive and journalist

Kimberly Godwin is an American television executive and journalist. From 2007 to 2021, Godwin worked in a variety of roles at CBS News. In April 2021, Godwin was named president of ABC News, becoming the first ever black woman to lead a major American broadcast news network. In May 2024, she announced her intention to resign from the network.

== Education ==
In 1984, Godwin graduated from Florida A&M University (FAMU) with a degree in broadcast journalism, where she studied at the School of Journalism & Graphic Communication.

== Career ==
Godwin has held newsroom-leadership roles in various cities including New York, Los Angeles, Dallas, Philadelphia and Cleveland.

=== Career at CBS (2007-2021) ===
Godwin joined CBS News in 2007. While with the network, she served as senior broadcast producer of CBS Evening News, executive director for development and diversity, and executive vice president of News.

While at CBS Godwin, in discussions with top executives at ViacomCBS, reportedly expressed interest in overseeing the company's news division. Variety reported that CEO George Cheeks was opposed to promoting her to oversee the news division, which ultimately led to her being released from her contract.

=== Presidency of ABC News (2021-2024) ===
In April 2021, Godwin was named president of ABC News, succeeding James Goldston, who had announced his resignation in January. She became the first black woman to lead a major American network's broadcast news division.

In 2022, The Hollywood Reporter reported that Godwin "is said to have made culture changes a priority" during her tenure. The report noted that Godwin had promoted "key players" at Good Morning America, and had worked to increase ABC News' presence in audio formats and specials.

In 2024, it was reported that, according to over two dozen staffers, morale at ABC News had declined under her leadership. CNN reported that staffers voiced concerns regarding declining ratings for Good Morning America, considered the network's flagship show. After receiving fierce criticism from within, Godwin announced on May 5, 2024 her intention to resign from the network. She was reportedly forced to resign. Reporting on her resignation, the New York Times, characterized her time at ABC as "a rocky tenure defined by infighting and damaging leaks".

== Political views ==
In an internal email to ABC staff in February 2024, Godwin condemned remarks made by former president and 2024 presidential candidate Donald Trump. Godwin described Trump's suggestion that his highly-publicized mug shot would assist his campaign among black voters as “as racist as they come.” In the email, which was reported by Semafor, Godwin stated:

"No matter one's politics, the fact that a person running for President of the United States made these remarks period — but also to a public crowd — and with so many black people present — and that they stand with him — is mind blowing. Shocking."

== Awards ==
Godwin has won six National News and Documentary Emmy Awards, two Edward R. Murrow Awards, an Alfred I. DuPont-Columbia Award, a Sigma Delta Chi Award, and the National Association of Black Journalists' Ida B. Wells Award.
