= Tia Lessin =

American documentary filmmaker and producer

- Born: United States
- Occupations: Film director, film producer

Tia Lessin is an American documentary filmmaker. Lessin has produced and directed documentaries, earned an Academy Award nomination for Best Documentary, three Emmy Awards, two primetime Emmy Nominations, the duPont Columbia Award, and the Sundance Grand Jury Prize for Documentary.

She directed the Emmy Award-winning film The Janes, with Emma Pildes, and is the director and producer, with Carl Deal, of Trouble the Water, Citizen Koch, and Steal This Story, Please!. She directed Behind the Labels and produced several of Michael Moore's films including Fahrenheit 9/11, Where to Invade Next and Fahrenheit 11/9.

== Career ==
Lessin is producer and director, together with Carl Deal, of the Academy Award-nominated feature documentary Trouble the Water, winner of the Gotham Independent Film Award and the Sundance Film Festival’s Grand Jury Prize for best documentary.

She directed the HBO film The Janes with Emma Pildes and won three Emmys in the categories of Best Documentary, Outstanding Social Issue Documentary and Outstanding Direction, Documentary at the 44th News and Documentary Emmy Awards. The film also won the Alfred I. duPont-Columbia Award's Silver Baton, which honors outstanding public service audio and video reporting in television, radio and digital journalism.

Lessin was a co-producer of Michael Moore's Where to Invade Next, Capitalism: A Love Story, Fahrenheit 9/11, winner of the Palme d'Or, and the supervising producer of Academy Award-winning Bowling for Columbine.

Lessin received the Sidney Hillman Prize for Broadcast Journalism for her documentary Behind the Labels. She line produced Martin Scorsese's No Direction Home: Bob Dylan and was consulting producer for his Living in the Material World: George Harrison. She began her career as associate producer of Charles Guggenheim's Oscar-nominated short film Shadows of Hate.

In television, Lessin's work as producer of the series The Awful Truth earned her two Emmy Award nominations and one arrest.

Lessin is a Sundance Institute Fellow, an Open Society Institute Katrina Media Fellow, a Creative Capital awardee and won the Women of Worth "Vision" Award by L’Oréal Paris and Women in Film.

== Awards and recognitions ==
- Winner, Ridenhour Documentary Film Prize (2024)
- Winner, Emmy Award, Best Documentary (2023)
- Winner, Emmy Award, Outstanding Social Issue Documentary (2023)
- Winner, Emmy Award, Best Direction, Documentary (2023)
- Nominee, Emmy Award, Best Research, Documentary (2023)
- Winner, Alfred I. duPont-Columbia Awards, 2023
- Academy Award nominee, Best Documentary Feature, 2008
- Winner, Grand Jury Prize, Sundance Film Festival
- Winner, Grand Jury Prize, Full Frame Film Festival
- Winner, Gotham Independent Film Award
- Nominee, Emmy Award for producer of Outstanding Informational program: long form, 2010
- Nominee, Emmy Award for Outstanding Individual Achievement in a Craft: Research, 2010
- Nominee, Producers Guild of America Award, best non fiction producer 2008
- Nominee, NAACP Image Award, 2008
- Council On Foundations Henry Hampton Award for Excellence In Film And Digital Media, 2009
- Harry Chapin Media Award for Film, 2009
- Winner, Sidney Hillman Prize for Broadcast Journalism
- Women of Worth Vision Award by L'Oréal Paris and Women in Film.
- Nominee, Primetime Emmy Award for producer of Outstanding Non-Fiction Series, 2000–2001
- Nominee, Primetime Emmy Award for producer of Outstanding Non-Fiction Series, 1998–1999
- Creative Capital grantee
- Sundance Institute Fellow
- Open Society Institute Katrina Media Fellow

== Filmography ==
=== Feature films and documentaries ===
- Steal This Story, Please! (2025), director
- The Janes (2022), director
- Fahrenheit 11/9 (2018), executive producer
- Where to Invade Next (2016), producer
- Citizen Koch (2013), director and producer
- Living in the Material World: George Harrison (2011), co-executive producer
- Capitalism: A Love Story (2009), co-producer
- Trouble the Water (2008), director and producer
- No Direction Home: Bob Dylan (2005), line producer
- Fahrenheit 9/11 (2004), producer
- Bowling for Columbine (2002), supervising producer
- Behind the Labels (2002), producer and director
- The Big One (1997), coordinating producer
- Shadows of Hate (1995), associate producer

=== Television ===
- The Awful Truth (1999, 2000), producer
- TV Nation: Volume One & Two (1997), associate producer
