= Apart (2021 film) =

2021 film directed by Jennifer Redfearn

- Directed by: Jennifer Redfearn
- Produced by: Tim Metzger; Jennifer Redfearn
- Cinematography: Tim Metzger
- Edited by: Rabab Haj Yahya; Francisco Bello
- Music by: Morgan Kibby
- Production companies: Red Antelope Films; Independent Television Service
- Release date: 2021
- Running time: 85 minutes
- Country: United States
- Language: English

Apart is a 2021 documentary film. The film follows three mothers as they return home after being released from jail where they spent time for drug charges.
