= Vice News Tonight =

Television news program

- Genre: News program
- Created by: Shane Smith; Josh Tyrangiel
- Theme music composer: Al Boorman
- Country of origin: United States
- Original language: English
- No. of seasons: 6
- No. of episodes: 1000

Production
- Executive producers: Madeleine Haeringer, Josh Tyrangiel, Maral Usefi, Nikki Egan
- Running time: 44 minutes
- Production company: Vice Media Group

Original release
- Network: HBO
- Release: October 10, 2016 – 2019
- Network: Vice TV
- Release: March 4, 2020 – May 25, 2023

Vice News Tonight is an American news program that aired on Vice TV on Thursday nights at 10 p.m. It was originally broadcast on HBO as the channel's first-ever daily series, premiering October 10, 2016. HBO cancelled the series after three seasons, ending September 2019. The program was relaunched in 2020 on the Vice TV network. In April 2023, Vice announced that Vice News Tonight would be cancelled, with its final show airing on May 25.

== Development ==
Josh Tyrangiel, Vice executive vice-president for news content said that the idea came in an effort to try to engage viewers, and not simply to summarize the news. He said that the purpose is "actually placing stories in context and understanding them in a timely way (is) where the great value is," and that Vice is focused on "trying to build a long-term relationship with viewers that's focused on how the world works."

Nina Rosenstein, executive vice president for HBO, said that the show came about because HBO "[wanted] the show to be a good fit for viewers looking for a traditional experience, as well as for those millennials who prefer to get their content on a tablet or a smartphone and want a more interactive experience."

== History ==
In August 2017, Vice News Tonight received attention after its coverage of the Unite the Right rally, entitled Charlottesville: Race and Terror, went viral after HBO's decision to put the entirety of the episode for free for all to view on YouTube. CNN's Brian Stelter declared the coverage to be Vice News Tonight's "breakout moment." The segment earned Vice News Tonight a 2017 Peabody Award for News coverage.

On June 10, 2019, HBO announced it would be cancelling Vice News Tonight and severing its seven–year partnership with Vice Media. In mid-August 2019, Viceland (now Vice TV), a basic cable network joint venture between Vice Media and A&E Networks, announced it was picking up Vice News Tonight. It premiered on March 4, 2020 at 8 p.m. ET/PT and would run an hour instead of the half-hour length while on HBO. Vice News Tonight aired on Vice TV Thursday nights at 10 p.m. ET/PT, for a full hour.

== Format ==
In a statement, Vice Media said that Vice News Tonight is a news program with "no ads, no anchors, and no censors."

A typical episode uses a mix of voiceovers, graphics and video packages to dive into national and global news, technology, the environment, economics, and pop culture. The program is devoted to the idea of not using on-air news anchors.

Episodes could be modified hours before airtime to accommodate more-newsworthy segments, and the show could go live if necessary.

Later episodes leaned into in-depth, immersive, longer format documentary style pieces from the field. Segments on a single topic generally range from 10–25 minutes or longer.

== Release and accessibility ==
Each segment from the show is available on Vice News' YouTube site after its premiere on Vice TV. Episodes during time the show was on HBO were available on HBO Go and HBO Now the day after they aired. The show has also designed with touch-screen capabilities, so viewers watching on HBO's digital platforms could pull up related documents, graphs and charts within episodes.

In Canada, the series debuted on October 10, 2016 with broadcasts on Viceland, and moved to MuchMusic after Viceland shut down.

In Australia, the series is broadcast on SBS Viceland.

== Reception ==
In a review of the first episode, Mike Hale of The New York Times said the show was "new, but no game changer", saying "As hackneyed, shallow and formulaic as network newscasts can be, they still offer something in terms of immediacy and comprehensiveness that Vice News Tonight, as it is currently constituted, can’t pretend to compete with. If you like the Vice sensibility, though, you might enjoy the show’s capsule version of it. Just don’t expect the news to be new."

Maureen Ryan of Variety said that "if nothing else, it’s good to know that two organizations with deep pockets are coming together in a major effort to help keep citizens — and especially younger Americans — informed... Between HBO and the Internet, one hopes the best of the organization’s reporters will see their work reach a much broader audience."

Daniel Fienberg of The Hollywood Reporter said that "In its best moments, Vice News Tonight felt like a string of little amuse-bouches to whet appetites for full meals available online. In its lesser moments, it felt like Full Frontal or Last Week Tonight without the jokes and, honestly, with less on-air depth. I think there's probably value in Vice News Tonight as almost a newsletter or digest point-of-entry into the absurd amount of content that the Vice empire generates every day. Even though those newsletters feel old-fashioned on the surface, all the cool media kids have their own and it would be just like the forward-thinking Vice to package theirs in the format of an equally old-fashioned newscast. We'll see if Vice News Tonight evolves into more than that.

In a more critical review, Brian Lowry of CNNMoney said "While Vice has promised a sort-of reinvention of the staid nightly news format, what it delivered merely played like Short Attention Span Theater... The half-hour would have benefited from fewer stories allowed a bit more room to breathe... There's no point in the pay channel doing me-too news, given its premium pedigree. Yet while the mix will surely evolve, Vice News Tonight's template offers a difference, yes, but at least initially, one without much distinction."
