= Carl Deal =

American documentary filmmaker and journalist

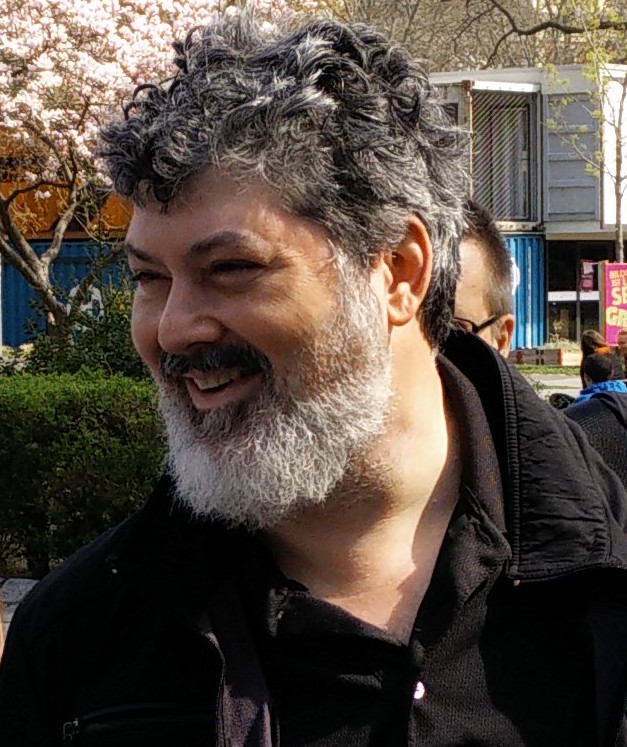
- Born: United States
- Occupations: Film director, film producer

Carl Deal is an American documentary filmmaker and journalist. He is the producer and director of the films Steal This Story, Please!, Trouble the Water and Citizen Koch, producer of Michael Moore's Where To Invade Next and Fahrenheit 11/9, and co-producer of Capitalism: A Love Story and Fahrenheit 9/11.

== Career ==
Carl Deal directed and produced, together with life partner Tia Lessin, the Oscar-nominated documentary Trouble the Water, their feature debut. The film, which chronicles one remarkable couple’s survival of Hurricane Katrina and their journey in its aftermath, was also honored with the 2008 Sundance Grand Jury Prize, and named Best Documentary Feature at the Full Frame Festival and the IFP/Gotham Independent Film Awards.

A longtime collaborator of director Michael Moore, Deal produced the anti-Trump epic Fahrenheit 11/9, which opened in September 2018 on over 1800 screens in the US, the widest theatrical opening of any documentary to date. He previously produced Moore's Where To Invade Next, and co-produced Capitalism: A Love Story. He has contributed to many other films.

Previously, as a broadcast news producer and journalist, Deal reported throughout the US, Latin America and in Iraq. He is a graduate of Columbia University's journalism school,, and has written investigative reports on environmental, civil and criminal justice for Greenpeace, Amnesty International and Public Citizen.

Deal and his partner and collaborator, Tia Lessin, live and work in Brooklyn, New York.

== Films ==
- Steal This Story, Please! (2025), director
- Fahrenheit 11/9 (2018), producer
- Michael Moore In Trumpland (2016), producer
- Where To Invade Next (2015), producer
- Citizen Koch (2013), director & producer
- Capitalism: A Love Story (2009), co-producer
- Trouble the Water (2008), director & producer
- The War on Democracy (2007), archival producer
- Fahrenheit 9/11 (2004), co-producer
- Bowling for Columbine (2002), archival producer
