= Trouble the Water =

2008 documentary film by Carl Deal and Tia Lessin

- Theatrical release poster
- Directed by: Tia Lessin; Carl Deal
- Produced by: Tia Lessin; Carl Deal
- Cinematography: PJ Raval and Kimberly Rivers Roberts
- Edited by: T. Woody Richman
- Music by: Davidge; Del Naja; Black Kold Madina
- Distributed by: Zeitgeist Films
- Release date: August 22, 2008
- Running time: 93 minutes
- Country: United States
- Language: English

Trouble the Water is a 2008 documentary film produced and directed by Tia Lessin and Carl Deal. The film centers on a young couple surviving Hurricane Katrina, and facing their own troubled past during the storm's aftermath. It features music by Massive Attack, Mary Mary, Citizen Cope, John Lee Hooker, The Roots, Dr. John and Blackkoldmadina. Trouble the Water was distributed by Zeitgeist Films and premiered in theaters in New York City and Los Angeles on August 22, 2008, followed by a national release.

== Synopsis ==
Trouble the Water opens with the filmmakers meeting 24-year-old aspiring rap artist Kimberly Rivers Roberts and her husband Scott at a Red Cross shelter in Central Louisiana, then flashes back two weeks, with Kimberly turning her new video camera on herself and her neighbors trapped in their 9th Ward attic as the storm rages.

The film combines Roberts' footage of the day before and the morning of the storm with archival news segments, other home videos, and verité footage filmed over two years. Trouble the Water explores issues of race, class, and the relationship of the government to its citizens.

== Critical reception ==
The film appeared on two critics' top ten lists of the best films of 2008.

== International distribution ==
Trouble the Water was distributed in France, with Celine Prost translating the French subtitles.

== Awards and nominations ==
The film was nominated for the Academy Award for Best Documentary Feature in 2008 and an Emmy Award for best informational program in 2010. It won the Grand Jury Prize Documentar at the 2008 Sundance Film Festival; the Grand Jury Award, the Kathleen Bryan Edwards Award for Human Rights, and the Working Films Award at the 2008 Full Frame Documentary Film Festival; and the Special Jury Prize at the 2008 AFI Docs festival.

The film won the Gotham Award for best documentary and the Council on Foundation's Henry Hampton Award. It has also been nominated for an NAACP Image Award for Outstanding Documentary and a Producers Guild of America Award for Best Documentary Motion Picture.

The African-American Film Critics Association and the Alliance of Women Film Journalists named the film the best documentary of 2008, and it finished second for the National Film Critics Circle Award. It also won the 2008 Working Films Award, the 2010 Harry Chapin Media Award, and was the official selection for the 2008 New Directors/New Films Festival.

Awards
Preceded by Manda Bala	Sundance Grand Jury Prize: U.S. Documentary; 2008	Succeeded by We Live in Public
