= Hostages (2022 TV series) =

2022 documentary television series

- Genre: Docuseries
- Directed by: Joshua Bennett; Maro Chermayeff; Jeff Dupre; Abbas Motlagh; Sam Pollard
- No. of seasons: 1
- No. of episodes: 4

Production
- Production companies: HBO Documentary Films; Show of Force

Original release
- Network: HBO Max
- Release: 28 September 2022

Hostages is a HBO documentary series directed by Joshua Bennett, Maro Chermayeff, Jeff Dupre, Abbas Motlagh and Sam Pollard. The series was released worldwide on 28 September 2022 by HBO Max.

== Synopsis ==
The four-part series explores events of the 1979 Iranian revolution and the 1979–81 Iran hostage crisis, examining other dimensions of the crisis, like the U.S. role in the Middle East politics during the 70's, and its impact on 1980 U.S. presidential elections, as well as the aftermath of the Iranian revolution.

Some footage used in the series had never seen before.

== Cast ==
The series consists of footage from Iranian revolutionaries, hostage-takers and other Islamic Republic officials, as well as interviews with involved people like Mohsen Sazegara, Abolhassan Banisadr, Masoumeh Ebtekar, and some of the hostages including Michael J. Metrinko, John W. Limbert, and Victor L. Tomseth.
