= Wildcat (2022 film) =

- Promotional release poster
- Directed by: Trevor Frost; Melissa Lesh
- Produced by: Joshua Altman; Trevor Frost; Melissa Lesh; Alysa Nahmias
- Starring: Harry Turner; Samantha Zwicker
- Cinematography: Trevor Frost; Melissa Lesh; Harry Turner
- Edited by: Joshua Altman; Ben Gold; Melissa Lesh; David Zieff
- Music by: Patrick Jonsson
- Production companies: 30West; Emerging Earth Films; Unbound Films; Ajna Films; Harmonium Pictures
- Distributed by: Amazon Studios
- Release dates: September 2, 2022 (Telluride); December 21, 2022 (United States)
- Running time: 106 minutes
- Country: United States
- Languages: English; Spanish

Wildcat is a 2022 American documentary film about animal rescue efforts in Peru, directed by the photojournalist Trevor Frost and Melissa Lesh. It was premiered at the 2022 Telluride Film Festival and was released in theaters on December 21, 2022, by Amazon Studios. In 2023, the film won an Emmy for Outstanding Nature Documentary.

== Summary ==
The film follows Harry Turner, a British war veteran suffering from post-traumatic stress disorder after tours of duty in Afghanistan. After his time in the army, he traveled to a remote Amazon rainforest in Peru. There he met an American wildlife biologist, Samantha Zwicker, who was involved in the rescue of wild animals threatened by poachers. The film also touches upon Zwicker's own traumatic personal history.

The film tracks their relationship as they work together to rescue an abandoned baby ocelot named Khan, training him to return to the jungle and survive on his own. Before Khan was old enough to be released, he was hit by an illegal shotgun trap and died, which had a severe emotional effect on Turner. One year later, Turner and Zwicker began to raise baby ocelot Keanu and successfully raised him to release age. Turner's family are also featured during a visit, drawing parallels between his love and mentorship for his younger brother and for the ocelots.

== Cast ==
- Harry Turner
- Samantha Zwicker

== Production ==
In 2019, Frost met Turner in Peru. Initially there to work on a photo project on anacondas, he decided to instead make a documentary about Turner's animal rescue efforts and relationship with Zwicker. Approximately half of the film is made up of footage shot by Turner and Zwicker. The film drew inspiration from conservation-themed documentaries such as Virunga, Grizzly Man and Jane.

On October 19, 2021, it was reported that Amazon Studios had acquired the then-untitled documentary from 30WEST and directors Frost and Lesh for approximately $20 million. The film was produced by Joshua Altman and Alysa Nahmias.

== Music ==
The film includes the original song "A Sky Like I've Never Seen" by Fleet Foxes featuring Tim Bernardes. Patrick Jonsson composed the score.

== Release ==
The film was premiered at the Telluride Film Festival on September 2, 2022. It opened with a limited theatrical release on December 21, 2022, and was released on Prime Video on December 30, 2022.

== Reception ==
On Rotten Tomatoes, the film holds an approval rating of 92% based on 49 reviews, with the consensus reading, "Although it raises some uncomfortable ethical quandaries, Wildcat is an affecting testament to the healing power of interspecies bonds." Stephen Farber of The Hollywood Reporter called it "a riveting journey into the wild", writing that although it leaves the viewer with unanswered questions about the relationship of Turner and Zwicker, "there is no arguing with the film's remarkable animal footage and the potent emotion that accompanies the inevitable moment when they must separate from the animal they have raised". Cath Clarke of The Guardian gave the film 4 out of 5 stars, calling it "genuinely heartfelt, made with incredible sensitivity and emotional intelligence by Melissa Lesh and Trevor Frost". Michael Rechtshaffen of the Los Angeles Times wrote that it "poignantly delivers its life-affirming, coming-of-age message with no cloying strings attached".

The film was named one of the Top 5 Documentaries of 2022 by the National Board of Review. At the IDA Documentary Awards, it was nominated for Best Editing (for editors Joshua Altman, Ben Gold, Melissa Lesh and David Zieff) and Best Music Score (for composer Patrick Jonsson). In 2023, the film won an Emmy for Outstanding Nature Documentary.
