= Nelu Handa =

Canadian comedian

Nelu Handa is a Canadian comedian, actress and writer. She is most noted for her work on the writing team for Baroness von Sketch Show, for which she was a winner of the Canadian Screen Award for Best Writing in a Variety or Sketch Comedy Program or Series at the 9th Canadian Screen Awards in 2021.

She has also written for the television series The Beaverton, Jann, My Perfect Landing, A Little Late with Lilly Singh, Sort Of, Children Ruin Everything, TallBoyz and Run the Burbs, and has had acting roles in the television series Jann, Odd Squad, Workin' Moms, New Eden, Endlings, Dino Dana and Holly Hobbie, and the web series Decoys and Avocado Toast.

She was a Canadian Screen Award nominee for Best Supporting Performance in a Web Program or Series at the 11th Canadian Screen Awards in 2023 for Avocado Toast.
