= Warren the Ape =

- Genre: Comedy
- Created by: Sean S. Baker; Spencer Chinoy; Dan Milano
- Written by: Sean S. Baker; Spencer Chinoy; Dan Milano
- Directed by: Sean S. Baker; Spencer Chinoy; Dan Milano
- Starring: Dan Milano; Josh Sussman; Dr. Drew Pinsky; Mary Devault
- Country of origin: United States
- Original language: English
- No. of seasons: 1
- No. of episodes: 12

Production
- Production locations: Los Angeles, California, United States
- Running time: 30 minutes
- Production company: MTV

Original release
- Network: MTV
- Release: June 14 – August 30, 2010

Warren the Ape is an MTV reality television parody which ran from June 14 to August 30, 2010, and aired at 10:30 p.m. The series is a spin-off of the IFC and Fox TV show Greg the Bunny, and follows the titular character's life as he tries to get his life back together following the cancellation of Greg the Bunny.

The series was created by Sean S. Baker, Spencer Chinoy, and Dan Milano, and is produced in association with MTV, Freestyle Entertainment, and Picture Shack Entertainment.

On November 19, 2010, the official Greg the Bunny/Warren the Ape website confirmed that there would be no season 2, and the show was in fact cancelled.

== Plot ==
Warren has paid more attention to drugs, booze, and women than his career, which has degenerated into a series of seedy exploitation films, obscure industrials, low-rent theater productions, and a regrettable string of skin flicks. With the help of his addiction specialist, Dr. Drew Pinsky, Warren tries (and often fails) to clean up his act, patch up his relationships, and claw his way back into the Hollywood limelight.

== History ==
Greg the Bunny was a franchise that began with Junktape a half-hour, bi-weekly cable TV Public-access television show created by Sean S. Baker, Spencer Chinoy, and Dan Milano. The show aired on New York City's Manhattan Neighborhood Network, Monday nights at 11:30 p.m. Warren did not appear on Junktape, but when the show's main character, Greg the Bunny, caught the attention of the Independent Film Channel (IFC) and was hired to introduce their independent films, the creators realized they needed someone with a little more intellectual focus to present their trivia segments. This is how Warren "The Ape" DeMontague was born.

The Greg the Bunny Show on IFC followed Greg, Warren, and other characters introducing independent films via a series of puppet-acted parodies. Warren and Greg were both performed and voiced by Dan Milano.

Warren and Greg then moved on to Fox TV in their biggest incarnation yet. The Fox show made its debut in March 2002 and its last episode aired in August 2002, with two episodes unaired. Despite its brief run, the series acquired a significant cult following, and was released on DVD in 2004.

In August 2005, Warren the Ape along with Greg the Bunny returned to the IFC, in a series of short segments, both old and new, spoofing movies such as Annie Hall, Miller's Crossing, Barton Fink, Fargo, Blue Velvet, Easy Rider and Pulp Fiction. The cast for these segments primarily features puppets Greg and Warren DeMontague, with appearances from Frederick "Count" Blah, puppet agent Pal Friendlies, and The Wumpus. Tardy the Turtle and Susan the Monster were unable to appear on IFC because they were created solely for the Fox series. This incarnation lasted for two seasons and is also available on DVD.

== Characters ==
- Warren DeMontague (voiced by Dan Milano) is the main character on the show, a veteran stage actor trying to make a new name for himself while having several substance-related vices. Frequently drunk and hardly ever prepared, Warren desperately tries to project an air of dignity (while wearing a ridiculous helmet).
- Dr. Drew Pinsky (as himself) is Warren's advisor whom Warren visits to update him on his progress.
- Cecil Greenblatt (played by Josh Sussman) is Warren's personal assistant whom he verbally abuses, also serving as his driver.
- Raquel (played by Mary K. DeVault) is Warren's "girlfriend."
- Laura (played by Laura Kachergus) is the leader of Warren's AA group, who has little patience for Warren's disruptive outbursts.
- Greg the Bunny is a side character, the title character of Greg the Bunny. He acts mostly as comic relief, and jokes are made at his expense (particularly by Warren) about how he cannot act and that he is just there to look cute.
- Seth Green played Jimmy Bender on the Fox version of Greg the Bunny, bearing a grudge against Warren for sleeping with his girlfriend. At Warren's attempts to patch things up between them, resulting with him accidentally having sex with Clare Grant, Seth ended up heavily hospitalized when accidentally hit by Cecil's car. By the time Warren visits him to borrow some money, Seth manages to regain use of his left hand to give a gesture as his way of saying no.
- Sarah Silverman is one of Warren's former co-stars. She hates Warren for an unknown reason and changed her number to get away from him. When Warren arrived to her studio to borrow some money, she went out in a rage until Warren seduced her and they had aggressive sex. But in doing so, Warren got their sex scene, though barely filmed from outside the building, on live television while forgetting all about the money in the heat of the moment.

== Episodes ==
| No. | Title | Directed by | Original release date |
|---|---|---|---|
| 1 | "Big Score" | Spencer Chinoy | June 14, 2010 |
In order to get a part in a cereal commercial, Warren sabotages a rival puppet actor with a sex scandal. Guest starring: Peter Ishkhans, Chauncey the Bear
| 2 | "Abstinence" | Dan Milano | June 21, 2010 |
After Dr. Drew tells Warren he must give up sex for 30 days, Warren decides to hang out with Greg The Bunny. However, after a day of being with him, Warren decides to focus on making Greg lose his virginity instead which results with Greg being arrested. Guest starring: Greg the Bunny
| 3 | "Crash Course" | Sean Baker | June 28, 2010 |
Warren takes a group of school kids on an unsanctioned field trip of life that includes back alley drug deals and strippers. Guest starring: Judy Greer
| 4 | "Amends" | Dan Milano | July 5, 2010 |
When Warren tries to make amends to people, skipping the other steps of alcoholic recovery, he gets bent on getting Seth Green's forgiveness when the actor refuses to accept his apology. Guest starring: Greg the Bunny, Seth Green
| 5 | "Gay Ape" | Spencer Chinoy | July 12, 2010 |
While attending a gay party for the drinks, a pornographic film of Warren resurfaces. But when doors are surprisingly opened for him, Warren fakes being homosexual to regain his fame. Guest starring: Perez Hilton, Ikki Twins, Robert Michael Morris, Nancy O'Dell, Matthew Scott Montgomery
| 6 | "Bad Po-Fo" | Sean Baker | July 19, 2010 |
Finally sober, Warren tries to get out of his MTV reality show in order to get a part in a big cop drama. Guest starring: Matt Besser, Billy Crudup, Corey Feldman
| 7 | "It Girl" | Sean Baker | July 26, 2010 |
Warren tries to date a pop singer named Fresca, hoping that the attention will propel him back into the limelight. Guest starring: Beau Garrett
| 8 | "Support System" | Spencer Chinoy | August 2, 2010 |
Warren is kicked out of his support group for being a disruptive influence, and retaliates by starting his own group.
| 9 | "Out with the Old" | Dan Milano | August 9, 2010 |
While having a garage sell, Warren ends up hiring an eager fan as Cecil's replacement. But though the fan manages to get him an autograph signing of a movie flop turned cult classic, Warren learns that his fan is a psychopath. Guest starring: Steve Little, Bob Gunton
| 10 | "Anger Management" | Sean Baker | August 16, 2010 |
Hanging out with Mick Foley and ignoring Dr. Pinsky's advice, Warren gets sent to a low security prison for anger issues. However, when he and Mick go too far, Warren ends up in solitary confinement where he learns a valuable lesson. Guest starring: Mick Foley
| 11 | "Black Lotus" | Dan Milano | August 23, 2010 |
After blowing all his rent money at the track, Warren sets out to borrow it from some famous friends. Guest starring: David Koechner, Count Blah, Eugene Levy, Sarah Silverman, Seth Green
| 12 | "Rock Opera" | Spencer Chinoy | August 30, 2010 |
Warren makes preparations for the opening night of the play he conceived during his time in jail. However, Warren's workaholic behavior proves to be taxing on his heart as he intends for the show to go on in the series finale. Guest starring: Corey Feldman, Count Blah, Greg the Bunny

== Appearances in other shows ==
Warren the Ape made a guest segment on Talk Soup, which aired in 2002. In it, Warren appears alongside guest host Sarah Silverman.
