= Robert G. Wilmers =

American billionaire banker

- Born: Robert George Wilmers; April 20, 1934; New York, U.S.
- Died: December 17, 2017 (aged 83); New York City, U.S.
- Education: Phillips Exeter Academy
- Alma mater: Harvard College
- Title: Chairman and CEO, M&T Bank
- Term: 1983–2017
- Spouse: Elisabeth Wilmers

Robert George Wilmers (April 20, 1934 – December 16, 2017) was an American billionaire banker. He was the chairman and CEO of M&T Bank from 1983 until his death in 2017, except for an 18-month break in 2005–2006.

== Early life and education ==
Robert George Wilmers was born in New York on April 20, 1934, as one of three children to Charles Wilmers, an executive with the Belgium utility holding company, Sofina, who would eventually become its president, and his wife Cecilia. He grew up in New York City and Belgium. His sister Mary-Kay Wilmers is the former editor of the London Review of Books, the well-known literary journal.

He graduated from the Phillips Exeter Academy and Harvard College (1956), and attended the Harvard Graduate School of Business Administration.

== Career ==
He started his career at Bankers Trust Co. in 1962, worked in New York City government under mayor John Lindsay as a financial official in the 1960s, then went on to work at Morgan Guaranty Trust Company.

He was chairman and CEO of M&T Bank and its subsidiary, Manufacturers and Traders Trust Company (M&T Bank) since 1983.

In 1992, the State University of New York at Buffalo School of Management named Wilmers Niagara Frontier Executive of the Year. In 1991, the Greater Buffalo Chamber of Commerce named him Western New Yorker of the Year. He received honorary degrees from Canisius College (1988), Niagara University (1991) and the State University of New York at Buffalo (2004). He was cited by The Buffalo News in 1987 and 1994 as a Citizen of the Year. Wilmers retired as CEO in 2005 but returned 18 months later after his successor, Robert Sadler, stepped down from the post and later received the 2005 American Banker Lifetime Achievement Award. In 2008, Wilmers was awarded Chevalier of the Legion of Honor by the President of France. In December 2011, he was named Banker of the Year by American Banker.

He purchased Chateau Haut-Bailly, a winery in Bordeaux, France, in 1998.

He was chairman of the Empire State Development Corporation from 2008 to 2009, chairman of the New York State Bankers Association in 2002 and as a director of the Federal Reserve Bank of New York from 1993 to 1998.

In 2011, he was named "banker of the year" by American Banker.

In 2016, together with several partners, he purchased a group of newspapers in western New England, including The Berkshire Eagle of Pittsfield, Massachusetts.

In January 2017, the rising value of bank stocks meant that Wilmers had become a billionaire.

== Personal life ==
His widow Elisabeth Wilmers is French, and they owned Château Haut-Bailly from 1998 until his death, as well as the nearby property Château Le Pape from 2012 onwards.

Wilmers died at his home in New York City on December 16, 2017. The cause of death was a heart attack while recovering from a recent surgery.
