= Avocado Toast (web series) =

Canadian comedy-drama web series

- Genre: Comedy
- Created by: Heidi Lynch; Perrie Voss
- Written by: Heidi Lynch; Perrie Voss
- Directed by: Sam Coyle
- Country of origin: Canada
- Original language: English
- No. of seasons: 2
- No. of episodes: 20

Production
- Producers: Charlie David; Heidi Lynch; Perrie Voss
- Production location: Toronto

Original release
- Network: OutTVGo
- Release: 18 May 2020 – 9 September 2022

Avocado Toast is a Canadian comedy-drama web series, which premiered in 2020 on OutTVGo. The series stars Heidi Lynch as Molly, a woman in her early 30s who unexpectedly falls in love with a woman for the first time, and learns after coming out as bisexual to her parents that they have been in an open marriage for many years; meanwhile, her best friend Elle (Perrie Voss) simultaneously discovers that her mother is having an affair with a man young enough to be her brother.

The series was based in part on Lynch and Voss's own real-life experiences.

The cast also includes Faye Marsay, Brenda Robins, Kristian Bruun, Nelu Handa, Scott Cavalheiro, Andrew Moodie, Mag Ruffman, Clare McConnell, Alexander Nunez and Prince Amponsah.

== Awards ==
Award	Date of ceremony	Category	Recipient(s)	Result	Ref(s)
Canadian Screen Awards	May 20, 2021	Best Lead Performance in a Web Program or Series	Heidi Lynch	Nominated	
Canadian Screen Awards	May 20, 2021	Best Lead Performance in a Web Program or Series	Perrie Voss	Nominated	
Canadian Screen Awards	May 20, 2021	Best Supporting Performance in a Web Program or Series	Kristian Bruun	Nominated	
Canadian Screen Awards	May 20, 2021	Best Supporting Performance in a Web Program or Series	Mag Ruffman	Nominated	
Canadian Screen Awards	April 16, 2023	Best Original Program or Series, Fiction	Charlie David, Heidi Lynch, Perrie Voss	Nominated	
Canadian Screen Awards	April 16, 2023	Best Lead Performance in a Web Program or Series	Heidi Lynch	Nominated	
Canadian Screen Awards	April 16, 2023	Best Lead Performance in a Web Program or Series	Perrie Voss	Nominated	
Canadian Screen Awards	April 16, 2023	Best Supporting Performance in a Web Program or Series	Prince Amponsah	Nominated	
Canadian Screen Awards	April 16, 2023	Best Supporting Performance in a Web Program or Series	Nelu Handa	Nominated	
Canadian Screen Awards	April 16, 2023	Best Supporting Performance in a Web Program or Series	Clare McConnell	Nominated	
Canadian Screen Awards	April 16, 2023	Best Direction in a Web Program or Series	Sam Coyle — "With a Side of... Decaf American't-Have-Kids-O"	Nominated	
