= Nina Stibbe =

British writer

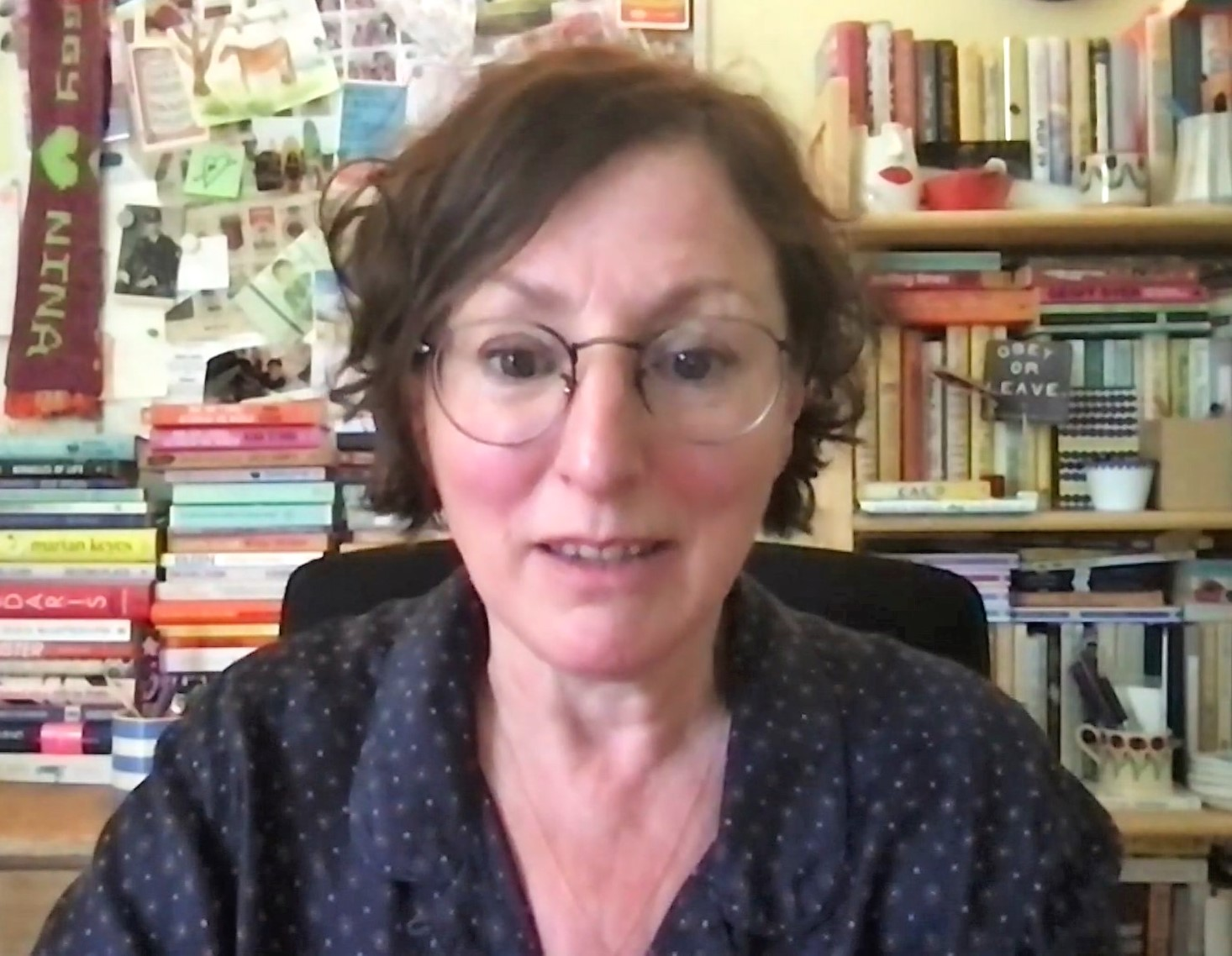
- Stibbe speaks to the British Library in 2022.
- Born: 1962 (age 63–64); Willoughby Waterleys, Leicestershire, England
- Occupation: Writer
- Partner: Mark Nunney
- Children: 2
- Writing career
- Language: English
- Years active: 2013–present
- Period: Contemporary
- Genre: Comic novels
- Subjects: Autobiographies; essays
- Notable awards: National Book Award; 2014 Love, Nina – Non-Fiction Bollinger Everyman Wodehouse Prize; 2019 Reasons to be Cheerful – Comic fiction Comedy Women in Print Prize; 2020 Reasons to be Cheerful – Published Comic Novel
- Website: ninastibbe.com

Nina Stibbe (born 1962) is a British writer born in Willoughby Waterleys and raised in Fleckney, Leicestershire. She became a nanny in the household of Mary-Kay Wilmers, editor of the London Review of Books. Her letters home to her sister became her first book, Love, Nina: Despatches from Family Life, which was adapted into the 2016 BBC television series, Love, Nina.

== Life and career ==
Born in 1962, Nina Stibbe grew up in rural Leicestershire, England, in a single-parent family. In 1982, she left Leicestershire to work as the nanny in the household of Mary-Kay Wilmers for two years, at 55 Gloucester Crescent, London, looking after Mary-Kay's two children with Stephen Frears, Sam and Will. At the time Gloucester Crescent was the home of a number of notable artistic and literary figures, including Alan Bennett, Jonathan Miller, Claire Tomalin, Karel Reisz, Deborah Moggach and Michael Frayn. This literary environment was completely new to her. During this time, Nina wrote letters to her sister Victoria, back in Leicestershire, detailing her experiences as a nanny amongst the literary elite. These letters became the basis for Love, Nina: Despatches from Family Life (2013), which was shortlisted for the Waterstones Book of the Year and won Non-Fiction Book of the Year at the 2014 National Book Awards.

After leaving the Wilmers household, Stibbe studied Humanities at Thames Polytechnic. In 1990 she started work as a marketing assistant at Harcourt Brace Jovanovich, then as a rep for the Open University Press, and finally for Routledge, becoming a commissioning editor. In 2002 she moved to Cornwall with her partner, Mark Nunney, whom she met while living on Gloucester Crescent, and their children.

In 2014, she published her first semi-autobiographical novel, Man at the Helm. Stibbe had been attempting to write the novel for more than 30 years, having struggled to find her voice.

In 2016, Love, Nina: Despatches from Family Life was adapted by Nick Hornby for the BBC, as Love, Nina, starring Faye Marsay in the title role and Helena Bonham Carter.

Reasons to Be Cheerful won the 2019 Bollinger Everyman Wodehouse Prize, making Stibbe the fourth woman to win the prize. Man at the Helm had been shortlisted in 2015 and Paradise Lodge had been on the 2017 shortlist. Two rare breed pigs were named Reasons and Cheerful after the novel's title, as per the tradition of the prize.

In 2020, Stibbe was awarded the Comedy Women in Print Prize for Reasons to Be Cheerful, winning £3,000.

== Awards ==
- 2014 – National Book Award for Non-Fiction ()
- 2019 – Bollinger Everyman Wodehouse Prize
- 2020 – Comedy Women in Print Prize (Reasons to Be Cheerful)

== Bibliography ==
- —— (2013). Love, Nina: Despatches from Family Life. London: Penguin.
- —— (2014). Man at the Helm. London: Penguin.
- —— (2016). Paradise Lodge. London: Penguin.
- —— (2017). An Almost Perfect Christmas. London: Penguin.
- —— (2019). Reasons to Be Cheerful. London: Penguin.
- —— (2022). One Day I Shall Astonish the World. London: Penguin.
- —— (2023). Went to London, Took the Dog: A Diary. London: Pan Macmillan.
