= Love, Nina =

- Genre: Comedy drama
- Based on: Love, Nina: Despatches from Family Life by Nina Stibbe
- Written by: Nick Hornby
- Directed by: S.J. Clarkson
- Starring: Faye Marsay; Helena Bonham Carter; Joshua McGuire; Ethan Rouse; Harry Webster
- Composer: Ruth Barrett
- Country of origin: United Kingdom
- Original language: English
- No. of series: 1
- No. of episodes: 5

Production
- Executive producers: Jamie Laurenson; Hakan Kousetta
- Cinematography: Balazs Bolygo
- Running time: 27–28 minutes

Original release
- Network: BBC One
- Release: 20 May – 17 June 2016

Love, Nina is a 2016 British comedy drama starring Faye Marsay and Helena Bonham Carter. Adapted by Nick Hornby from Nina Stibbe's book, Love, Nina: Despatches from Family Life, the series received its debut on BBC One on 20 May 2016 and ran for five episodes. Set in 1982, the series tells the story of Nina (Marsay), a 20-year-old woman from Leicester who moves to Primrose Hill, London, to work as a nanny for single mother George (Bonham Carter).

It is based on her experiences working in the household of Mary-Kay Wilmers, editor of the London Review of Books. The two boys in the series are based on her sons with filmmaker Stephen Frears, one of whom, Sam Frears, plays a neighbour. On 15 May 2017, it was made available to stream on Netflix in the UK.

== Cast and characters ==
- Faye Marsay as Nina Stibbe
- Helena Bonham Carter as George Bulut
- Jason Watkins as Malcolm Turner, a Scottish poet neighbour
- Joshua McGuire as Mark Nunney, the love interest
- Sam Frears as Ray, another neighbour
- Ethan Rouse as Joe, younger son
- Harry Webster as Max, elder son
- Selina Cadell as Ursula Vaughan Williams

== Broadcast ==
Internationally, the series debuted in Australia on BBC First on 1 November 2016.
