= Glitch Techs =

American animated television series

- Genre: Comedy; Action; Science fiction
- Created by: Eric Robles; Dan Milano
- Voices of: Ricardo Hurtado; Monica Ray; Scott Kreamer; Dan Milano; Luke Youngblood
- Theme music composer: Brad Breeck
- Opening theme: "Glitch Techs Theme" by Brad Breeck and Melody Carrillo
- Composer: Brad Breeck
- Country of origin: United States
- Original language: English
- No. of seasons: 2
- No. of episodes: 19

Production
- Executive producers: Eric Robles; Dan Milano
- Producers: Debbie Steer; Lisa Thibault Woods
- Running time: 44 minutes (episode 1); 22 minutes
- Production company: Nickelodeon Animation Studio

Original release
- Network: Netflix
- Release: February 21 – August 17, 2020

Glitch Techs is an American animated television series created by Eric Robles and Dan Milano and produced by Nickelodeon Animation Studio for Netflix. The series premiered on Netflix on February 21, 2020, with a second season premiering on August 17 of the same year. The series was halted by Nickelodeon and Netflix after season two, leaving ten additional episodes unfinished after a production hiatus according to series co-creator Eric Robles.

== Premise ==
Glitch Techs centers on teens Hector "High Five" Nieves and Miko "Me_K.O." Kubota in the city of Bailley, where a group of people are secretly dealing with Glitches that cause video game characters to manifest as energy beings into the real world. These beings operate based on the coding of their affected games and thus create havoc.

To stop these Glitches, the Glitch Techs, working at a local game store as a front, use their gamer logic and equipment to counter and defeat them. After capturing or destroying the Glitches, they also repair any damage they might have caused and erase any memories in order to prevent further panic.

== Cast ==
=== Bailley Glitch Techs ===
==== Dream Team ====
- Ricardo Hurtado as Hector "Five" Nieves, one of the two main characters. An avid gamer with confidence issues who grows with Miko's friendship. Five learned his gaming and computer skills from his father, Emilio, and continues to call him in prison weekly. Throughout the series, he is able to display strong leadership characteristics, hinting at a future of a top-level Glitch Tech team position.
  - Liam Ramos as Young Five
- Monica Ray as Miko Kubota, one of the two main characters. A sporadic gamer with energy to spare, she brings Five and herself into the Glitch Techs after remembering a Glitch event. She has bested Five in numerous online co-op games, and is also the only known person that is somehow impervious to the Glitch Tech's memory resetting after hitting her head during the reset process, but the creators' have stated there is an even bigger meaning to her resistance.

==== Mitch Squad ====
- Luke Youngblood as Mitch Williams (a.k.a. MitchFTW), the number one Hinobi gamer in the city of Bailley. He is Five's and Miko's inhospitable and egotistical senior Glitch Tech who tends to abuse his authority, but does have a good side to him. He is later revealed to be the youngest of a four-sibling video game stream-team who gave up his gaming career to focus on his job at Hinobi.
- Zehra Fazal as Zahra Rashid, one of the senior Glitch Techs. She is Muslim and wears a hijab throughout the series. She is a skilled support type specialist, aloof, and willing to casually give an honest answer. In the episode "BUDS", she is implied to have a crush on Five.
- Sandeep Parikh as Haneesh Jyoshi, one of the senior Glitch Techs. He is a proficient hacker and skilled Raid player.
- Greg Nix as Adam Michael Nix, a senior Glitch Tech who mentors and is partner to Bergy during the 'Castle Crawl' mission. He works publicly at the Joystick Junior Arcade to monitor the location, as it is a hotbed for frequent Glitch activity; often failing to spread his cool nickname "Scorekeeper".

==== Bailley HQ Techs ====
- Scott Kreamer as Phil Altiere, the Glitch supervisor and trainer for the Bailley branch of Hinobi. Having an exhausted but calm demeanor when at peace, he has the experience needed to guide his trainees. In "BITT Prime", Phil ends up finding a secret file hidden in BITT. He subsequently finds it was made by his younger self, containing a recording that reveals Hinobi Corporate has repeatedly wiped his memory due to unknown circumstances, and other information that apparently could be helpful in the future. His last name is revealed in the same episode.
- Dan Milano as BITT (the Binary Intelligence Tech Trainer), which serves as Phil's robotic assistant, personal data drive, and information provider for Five and Miko. In the episode "BITT Prime", BITT is discovered to store very important information about Phil's past.
  - Milano also voices Miko and Five's pet Glitches Ally and Alpha, as well as other computers and glitches. In season two he voices Jimmy Alcorn, the owner of the Joystick Junior Arcade where Glitches frequently appear.
- Josh Sussman as Cecil "Bergy" Bergoch, another noob of Glitch Techs and a fast friend to Hi-5 and Me-K.O. after they join him on an XP Quest. He is often around for comedic relief and the butt of most everyone's jokes.
- Felicia Day as Emma Deveraux, a specialist in training companion pets for Glitch Techs. She views companion pet Glitches as living things, and teaches Miko and Five to reassess how they treat their companion pets.

=== Dabney Glitch Techs ===
- Jane Lynch as Joan Fishback, the supervisor for the Hinobi branch from Bailley's neighboring town Dabney. She and Phil have a friendly rivalry with each other.
- Arnie Pantoja as Nameless, a senior Glitch Tech who leads his own squad and hides his face behind a helmet.
- Felicia Day as Simi, a Glitch Tech originally from the Bailley store who transfers to Dabney.
- Vince Green as Wes Sreebny, a Glitch Tech and Ray's twin brother.
- Afi Ekulona as Ray Sreebny, a Glitch Tech and Wes' twin sister.

=== Hinobi Corporate ===
- Betsy Sodaro as Inspector 7, "Bookworm" Barbara. A former Glitch Tech from Phil's time, she inspects his store to ensure it operates within desired ranges. Covertly, she is to monitor Miko primarily due to her immunity to memory reset, and Five as well as being her friend.
- Fred Tatasciore as the Tech Specialist, a Hinobi agent mainly assigned to Perma-Ban players who abuse Hinobi products that routinely cause glitches. His design is partially inspired by Tatasciore's gaming voice-over role as "Soldier: 76" from Overwatch.

=== Other characters ===
==== Five's family ====
- Eric Lopez as Papi, Five's grandfather and owner of a Taco food truck.
  - Lopez also voices Emilio Nieves, Papi's son, and Five's father. Emilio went to prison for white hat hacking, but still makes weekly video calls to Five.
- Jolene Kim as Abuela, Five's grandmother, and Emilio's mother.

==== Miko's family ====
- Stephanie Sheh as Mayumi Kubota, Miko's mother. She maintains a strict and overprotective regimen over Miko due to her daughter's struggles with focusing and want of self-control. In spite of this, she simply wants the best from Miko deep down cause she loves her, as well as from the rest of her children.
- Dee Bradley Baker as Hugh Kubota, Miko's father. While not as strict as Mayumi, he supports and helps out his wife in her parental functionals; such as driving the kids or giving advice.
- Rachael Russakoff as Nica Kubota, Miko's big sister. Once a gamer who taught Miko how to play video games, now a socially self-conscious high schooler, but still enjoys mobile app games.
  - Russakoff also voices the Glitch Tech gauntlets in the series.
- Haley Tju as Lexi Kubota, Miko's little sister. A sports perfectionist and overachiever who knows about Miko's Glitch Tech activities, saving recordings since Miko's start, but promises her secrets safe with her since blackmail is against their "sibling code".
- Amy Hill as Grandma Kubota, Miko's maternal grandmother and Mayumi's mother.

==== Mitch's family ====
- Kirby Howell-Baptiste as Audrey "Aud" Williams, Mitch's older sister and a member of the aggro pro-streamer team, "The Furious Four".
- Adetokumboh M'Cormack as Ruf Williams, Mitch's older brother and a member of the aggro pro-streamer team, "The Furious Four".
- Bryton James as Speck Williams, Mitch's older brother and a member of the aggro pro-streamer team, "The Furious Four".

==== Bailley residents ====
- Zehra Fazal as Sabrina, a little girl who occasionally witnesses the Glitch Techs.
- Catherine Taber as Nancy McGillicutty, Lexi's rival in Karate.
- Candi Milo as Lupita, one of the kids who watch Five play games during his breaks from his grandparents' food truck. Her voice and design are based on Lupe from Eric Robles' animated series, Fanboy & Chum Chum.
- Roshon Fegan as Casino, an old friend of Five's whom the latter separated from for a few years, but then reunited in "Smashozaurs".
  - Dallas Young voices a young Casino
- Cree Summer as Geraldine Lawson, an old friend of Five's father, Emilio Nieves, and the owner of a retro-gaming store, Game Kingdom. She is named after Gerald Lawson, who helped create the first video game cartridges.
- Nathan Arenas as Mike Simms, a new kid in town with gamer skills on par with or rivaled against Miko's. After a rough first meeting and a competitive dance-off that almost got out of hand, Mike decided to become friends with Miko. Ridley also mentioned having had a grudge against him.
- Johnny Young as Ryu Simms, Mike's older brother.
- Amanda McCann as Blake, a drive-thru attendant at Mama Miyamoto's Spaghetti in a Bucket. She is implied to be attracted to Bergy.
- Ashly Burch as Ridley Croft, a hacker/modder who discovered Hinobi Glitches by experimenting on her personal console and modifies them to be docile pets. She is shown to have extensive trust issues and has panic episodes at the slightest feeling of "betrayal" from others. While initially a good acquaintance to Miko on their initial meeting, Ridley came to distrust her thinking she just wanted her to be "normal" like everyone else around her. She eventually does befriend Miko and Five, however, and even manages to gain Mitch's respect, who spares her from having her memory wiped.

== Production ==
Glitch Techs is produced by Nickelodeon Animation Studio in the United States, with animation services provided by Top Draw Animation in the Philippines and assistance from Flying Bark Productions in Australia. The series was announced on May 25, 2016. Nickelodeon originally ordered a 20 episode first season, with an extra ten episodes greenlit after. However on January 12, 2019, it was reported that production on the series was stalled and crew members were being laid off. However, Robles later said that Glitch Techs had not been cancelled.

In early 2020, it was confirmed that the series had moved to Netflix, and the first half of the 20 produced episodes would premiere on February 21 as its first season. On July 22, 2020, it was announced that season 2 would be released on August 17.

== Episodes ==
=== Series overview ===
Season	Episodes	Originally released
1	9	February 21, 2020
2	10	August 17, 2020

=== Season 1 (2020) ===
No. overall	No. in season	Title	Directed by	Written by	Storyboarded by	Original release date	Prod. code
1	1	"Age of Hinobi"	Ian Graham	Dan Milano	Ben Choi, Chris Graham, Ian Graham; Phil Jacobson, Ben Juwono, Sung Kim and Sarah Partington	February 21, 2020	101–102
A day after Glitch Tech Mitch Williams captures the "Zoid" glitch and resets witness memories, Hector "Five" Nieves rushed to the Hinobi Game Tournament, while Miko "Me-K.O." Kubota sneaks out of a family function to remote play. After a rough start, they both go co-op out of disdain for Mitch's unsportsmanlike conduct. Reaching the final platform, a Glitch occurs, so Miko gives Five her ball to score the goal. But in real life, the Glitch manifests in front of the tournament audience, so Mitch's team defeats it and reset everyone's memories. However, Miko is immune to the memory reset and escapes being grounded to seek out Five. Together, they track down Mitch and confirm their suspicions, but confronting him releases the Zoid glitch into an arcade. Mitch locks the pair in his van, allowing them to activate BITT and Five to remember the tournament. Both adorn Glitch Tech gear to capture the glitch, now 'Chomp Kitty', but it soon goes viral manifesting other Glitch entities and eats Mitch. Five gets the idea to reverse a power-up into a nerf and derezzed Chomp Kitty, saving Mitch, who pleads they not reveal his tournament loss, so they are compensated with jobs at the company.
2	2	"Tutorial Mode"	Chris Graham	David Anaxagoras	Phil Jacobson, Sung Kim and Sarah Partington	February 21, 2020	103
Phil has Five and Miko undergo "The Tutorial" in the simulator, which leads to an irate Miko to break and hard reboot the console. Seeking their tutorial file, they instead locate the full catalog of all Hinobi games, and procrastinate playing the infamously unsold "Gross Out". Meanwhile, Phil, having ignored BITT's earlier warnings, is met by old friend "Bookworm" Barbara, who is to inspect his store because of the tournament Glitch, aiming to reset employees and close up if he fails. While playing, Five and Miko realize "Gross Out" was unsold because it was a glitched game, and release "Garbile" who forces the duo out of the simulator. Not wanting Phil to fire them, they lure Garbile into the trash compactor, mistakenly augmenting the glitch. When Phil and Barbara encounter them, Garbile unleashes his Max-Level fury, but Five and Miko get the idea to summon Garbile's game nemesis, Sanitron, to co-pilot for a win. An impressed Barbara decides not to shut down the store and a thankful Phil still has them complete the tutorial. Elsewhere, Barbara informs a superior about Miko and Five's progress, as said superior believes the duo can locate the reclusive "Bolypius".
3	3	"Going, Going, Gauntlet!"	Phil Allora	Ashly Burch	Benjamin Carow, Ben Choi, Michael Fong and Sheldon Vella	February 21, 2020	104
On their inaugural day, Miko & Five get their first gauntlets, but Miko loses hers to a teleporting bird, and panics remembering her mom's "Focus" lecture. Confronting the bird again, it eats Miko's gauntlet to fire derez blasts, informing Five that it replicates powers from whatever it eats. The duo get the idea to use the mung bean sandwich lunch Miko's mom gave her to trigger a gag reflex, forcing the gauntlet free. Five scans the bird, who Miko names "Ally", and finds it was unstable after eating another Glitch, identified as Ginko, which grew to the size of a small building in a few short moments. Miko breaks her gauntlet just defending Five and Ally, but they learn Ginko's pattern. After they devise a plan using Ally to attack Ginko's power source, Five gives Miko his gauntlet to take the shot using a timed dive bomb to derez giant Ginko and earn 10,000 XP. After reseting witness memories, Phil repairs Miko's gauntlet, and the duo turn in their XP for prizes, but decide to instead list Ally as a companion pet in their team's resources. At home, Miko's mom tells her how proud she is about getting her job.
4	4	"Smashozaurs"	Chris Graham	Jeff Trammell	Phil Jacobson, Sung Kim and Sarah Partington	February 21, 2020	105
As Five and Miko lose another glitch snag to Mitch's kill steal, Five races to see his friend Casino at the arcade for a reunion, after a two year split. As they play their favorite 'Smashozaurs' game, an ultra rare "Possessor" Glitch appears and fuses Casino to his favorite character avatar. To protect Casino from Mitch, Five escapes with him while Miko runs interference with Mitch, who later explains that the Possessor Glitch is an XP goldmine before stunning Miko to chase Casino. At a junkyard, Five and Casino smash junk before hitting an argument as Five wants to remove the Possessor and restore Casino. BITT explains to Miko that, if not removed soon, the Possessor could be a permanent fusion and turn viral to humans. Remembering how the Smashozaur games have end levels on bridges, Miko stalls Mitch once more as Five intercepts Casino and tries to reach his friend inside. After a brawl where Five and Miko are hurt, Casino regains his sense of self and forces out the Glitch; Mitch arrives to capture the Possessor and takes his leave. Following Casino's memory reset, Five and Miko return to the arcade to just play games uninterrupted as friends.
5	5	"Castle Crawl"	Phil Allora	Sandeep Parikh	Ben Choi, Michael Fong and Sheldon Vella	February 21, 2020	106
After Nix and Bergy and two other teams go AFK on a glitch capture, Five and Miko are sent in to resolve the Mapper Glitch, which overlays a game setting atop real environments, finding the interior to be a massive castle from "Castlestein". Once inside, Miko and Five are locked in the game and shut down their gauntlet to save batteries. Seeking the game boss, Nogrog, they encounter a mini-boss, who Five struggles to fight as Miko spectates. He admits to never finishing the game, having lied out of feeling left out. Miko surmised this, and pulls him out to continue, saying she doesn't think less of him. Reaching Nogrog, they learn his pattern to win, but realize the still active game is unbeaten, thus there's an unseen component. Remembering his riddle, Five uses a random drop key he found earlier to access the next step, and they reach the "unreachable" Loot Drop from a mystery chest: a spork. At the true final round, Five realizes the statue behind Nogrog is his weak point, and the spork becomes a magic super sword, which allows them to co-op a win, catch the Mapper Glitch, and free the other Glitch Techs. Note: This episode is a homage to the Konami video game franchise Castlevania.
6	6	"Alpha Leader"	Chris Graham	Ashly Burch	Sung Kim, Phil Jacobson and Sarah Partington	February 21, 2020	107
Five & Miko, going by "Dream Team," aid Mitch's Raid Squad to derez a Glitch swarm, but Mitch gets an infection from the boss Glitch and is quarantined. Elsewhere, four MMO Avatar Glitches manifest in an abandoned amusement park, so Five is made Dream Team's Raid Leader with Haneesh and Zahra as add-ons. However, Mitch convinces Five's to "act like a leader", making Five replicate Mitch's toxic Leadership style, and dismissing Haneesh and Zahra's advice. After Miko destroys a Control Point Rod, their victory is short-lived when all four MMO Glitches retaliate, forcing Dream Team to retreat. Once Five derezzed one of the Glitches, he learns they can respawn via a command ship, which Haneesh tried warning about all mission. Five realizes his team's capture is his fault, and with Ally's help to free Dream Team, Five makes amends so they can strategize to destroy the Respawn Ship. While Five fights the MMO Glitches, Dream Team use one of Haneesh's hacks to mod the control rods and destroy the respawn ship. With the glitches defeated, Dream Team commends Five for his leadership and being himself; Haneesh and Zahra decide to rotate leadership on missions to better their command skills.
7	7	"Collection Quest"	Phil Allora	Jenny DeArmitt	Ben Choi, Alex Chiu and Michael Fong	February 21, 2020	119
When Five realized he forgot to pre-order limited edition swag, BITT informs him there's a saved copy in the Loot Locker for XP trade-in. Dream Team co-op with Bergy for a timed crystal quest to get the XP needed, but Miko is concurrently forced by her mother to take Nica along for "bonding time", mandating a selfie every ten minutes for confirmation. Five and Bergy collect the first crystal from a game turtle, but fail to reset a witness, while Nica explains to Miko how her classmates mocked a random student after a misunderstanding, so Nica feels peer pressure. After Five and Bergy get more crystals, they reluctantly invite Nica as they seek more crystals at a car-wash. In Five's haste, he opens a hole in the ground to reveal a treasure trove and a 'Narwhalrus' Glitch, the boss from an app game Nica plays: "Crystal Crush". Nica proves the gems around them are ammunition, so they use it to attack the Glitch by destroying its projectiles. Sacrificing their crystals to wear down Narwhalrus, Dream Team weaken it so Five can land the finishing blow and collect 500,000 XP; the Kubota sisters later take another selfie, after the fun day together.
8	8	"Adventures in Pet Training"	Phil Allora	Jen Bardekoff & Dan Milano	Ben Choi, Michael Fong and Myriam Fourati	February 21, 2020	116
While pursuing a "Ka-Zoom" Glitch, Ally badly glitches out causing Miko to get increasingly worried. At Headquarters, Phil directs the duo to Emma, Hinobi's pet trainer, who portals Five and Miko into a custom map based on Ally's native game to help find a solution, but the game glitches to trap them inside and on opposite ends of the map. Struggling to cross a lava river, Miko and Ally find an underground path against a caveworm, and after giving Ally a fruit, Miko realizes she needed food native to her game to restore her, and activates Ally's Phoenix Form. Elsewhere, Five has difficulty bypassing gate sentries, but encounters the mech golem Alpha, who helps him through in exchange for repairs. Once fixed, Five and Alpha become friends, and tank rush their way to reunite with Miko and Ally at the summit. Atop the tower, Dream Team encounter the Guardian, but are losing time to win and exit the simulation, so Alpha sacrifices itself to help them escape. In real life, Emma explains the entrapment was intentional to teach them, with Miko grateful for understanding Ally better, and Five realizing pets are indeed unique, thus Emma restores Alpha to be Five's personal pet.
9	9	"Karate Trainer"	Phil Allora	Eric Acosta	Ben Choi, Michael Fong and Sheldon Vella	February 21, 2020	109
At Miko's home, Lexi reveals to her having knowledge of Miko's work being a Glitch Tech to ask her help for training before her Karate finals. Miko agrees, and calls in Five for help to sneak into the simulator at HQ by swiping Phil's access card and explain Lexi to Five. Activating the "Karate Trainer 4" dojo, Lexi struggles to learn the skills for the martial arts styles until Miko demonstrates as Five elaborates. Exiting the "Monkey" stage, Five learns from BITT that the simulator is under repairs, and won't deactivate as Lexi's training belt remains in use. At the Karate Finals, after Lexi loses to Nancy McGillicutty and the Kubotas leave, Dream Team try to derez the glitched Dojo training belt. However, it instead materializes the Dojo and The Master, who overwhelms Five and Miko. Lexi hears Master's words and realizes that, as the "student", she needs to beat the Master instead. Five and Miko watch as Lexi uses the martial arts she gained from the game to overpower and defeat the master, ending the Glitch and earning a perfect combo game trophy. The sisters go home to play more games, with Lexi comfortable with winning or losing.

=== Season 2 (2020) ===
No. overall	No. in season	Title	Directed by	Written by	Storyboarded by	Original release date	Prod. code
10	1	"The Glitch Modder"	Chris Graham	Ashly Burch	Phil Jacobson, Sung Eun Kim and Sarah Partington	August 17, 2020	111
After Dream Team, Mitch Squad and Bergy defeat a pufferfish glitch, Miko is hit by a reset blast and reveals her Reset Immunity to the others. While Miko is unnerved her immunity disturbs them, she follows a modded Chomp-Kitty and gets separated from Five to meet its modder, Ridley, who becomes fast friends with Miko. Ridley shows Miko her modified Hinobi console with rewritten docile Glitches, but as Miko tries recruiting her to safely continue her coding under Hinobi employment, Ridley is unnerved at the idea of losing her glitches. Five tracks them to Ridley's lair, barges in and accidentally releases the "Drago-Kitty" glitch Ridley modded. As their Tech Gauntlets are incompatible with the modded code, Ridley forms a solution after Five saves her, but her main console is destroyed. With a back-up system, Ridley gives the Glitch Techs coding to fight the Drago-Kitty by manifesting game gear in real life to win. Afterward, Miko still offers Ridley a position as a Glitch Tech, but she refuses out of distrust and portals away. Back at HQ, Miko finds that the others are still friends with her after learning about her immunity, and tells off Mitch for getting in her head.
11	2	"Ping"	Phil Allora	Brad Bell and Dan Milano	Ben Choi, Michael Fong and Sheldon Vella	August 17, 2020	113
When Five gets a call from his dad's old friend Geri, he finds the vintage game she ordered, PING, glitched the main pixel. Arriving at the game store, Five informs Miko that his dad helped code the vintage "Uni-Corp" game in the shop, but went to prison for hacking, thus the sensitive topic never came up before. Finding the cube glitch, it is unaffected by Glitch Tech gauntlets, forcing the duo to lead it into the forest out of town to try to contain it. Having no success, Miko calls BITT for backup and sends Mitch to help; who releases the Cube Glitch thinking it non-threatening. Passing it around to contain it, Five remembers the "Uni-Corp" game, asking Miko with Mitch hold it so he can bypass a solution with the Uni-Corp Unicorn. Meanwhile, Miko makes a portal Infinite Loop to stall the Cube, but instead hyperdrives its momentum and it races towards a power plant. Mitch and Miko try overclocking their Speed Boosts to catch the Cube, but are saved by Five's timely return with the Unicorn Glitch, which then derezzed the cube. Returning to Geri's shop, Five repairs her PING machine, and makes his weekly call with his dad.
12	3	"Ralphie Bear Is Back"	Hyunjoo Song	Eric Acosta, Ashly Burch, Dani Michaeli and Dan Milano	Trey Buongiorno, Alice Herring, Max Lawson, David Ochs and Zane Yarbrough	August 17, 2020	114
The Joystick Junior Arcade announces the return of mascot Ralphie Bear, who 10 years earlier was destroyed by the "Birthday Ruiner" and never seen again. Phil assigns Dream Team to inspect the Arcade before opening for Glitch activity, but Five takes advantage of the opportunity to have a Ralphie Bear show, never having the chance to as a kid. But upon activation, the Cakey von Smasher robot Glitches and Miko destroys Ralphie in reflex. As their gauntlets cannot stop Cakey, they flee and barricade themselves in a storage room for safety, and then realize the Glitch is protected in the robot's head. Miko admits to destroying Ralphie Bear 10 years earlier in reflex from the jump scare arrival and ruining a birthday party she was invited to; Five apologizes to her, too focused on his own grief to consider younger Miko's experience. Realizing Cakey is following the show program, Miko dresses up as Ralphie Bear and the duo fight the Cakey robot to TKO the Glitch. They inform the arcade owner, who admits he mothballed Ralphie due to numerous complaints from everyone over the years. Phil arrives to trade in unused arcade tickets, but also reflex destroys Ralphie on sight. Note: This episode is a homage to the indie horror game Five Nights at Freddy's, which features possessed animatronics attacking the player.
13	4	"BUDS"	Phil Allora	Sarah McChesney	Ben Choi, Michael Fong and Sheldon Vella	August 17, 2020	110
Mitch Squad and Dream Team arrive to a Copycat Glitch, but Mitch orders everyone wait outside as he solo wins; Five points out Mitch used to be a good gamer on his channel, postulating being a Glitch Tech changed him for the worse. Back at HQ, a straggler Copycat stowed away in Mitch's coat takes him and pretends to be a better version of him to slowly replace other Glitch Techs with "BUDS" by saying they should be "BUDS"; Miko notes this behavior and warns Five, to no avail. At a party "Mitch" organized, Miko follows Glitch-Mitch and discovers the true nature of the Glitch it really is, only to be replaced herself. Five slowly discovers that everyone was replaced with Copycat plant Glitches, and narrowly escapes, discovering with help from his tech that BUDS means Burrowing Underground Doppelganger Squadron. Finding the main Glitch, he frees Miko but is caught by the Glitch and Glitch-Mitch tries to offering Five to join, but he refuses as Miko backs him up. To even the odds, they free the other Techs to group raid the BUDS Glitch, and real Mitch informs them to aim for the original Copycat and Five leads the attack. Afterward, Mitch thanks Five and Miko, but also takes everyone's XP, which his copycat gave away while impersonating him. Note: This episode is a homage to Invasion of the Body Snatchers.
14	5	"The New Recruit"	Chris Graham	Ashly Burch	Phil Jacobson, Sung Eun Kim and Sarah Partington	August 17, 2020	115
As attempts to make a Glitch Tech gauntlet from scans of Miko and Five keep failing, Ridley instead upfront asks for one and is recruited by them. Despite Phil's insistence against it, Ridley wins him over with modded upgrades to BITT, and is put through the tutorial; she hacks the system to hyper fast forward and finish quickly. Ridley is taken on a Glitch Tech tour, and runs afoul of Mitch who drove by KS her win. Wanting to get back at Mitch, Ridley develops Glitch cloning code to stimulate their capture numbers and outperform Mitch, despite Five and Miko's hesitance; placing first on the leaderboard, Ridley's behavior easily informs Mitch what happened. As Five and Miko want to admit how they did it, Ridley has an episode seeing them 'turn' on her, so she releases all captured Glitches and absconds with her gauntlet. While Glitch Techs handle the break out, Ridley's guilt grows until she returns to get Mitch's help, modding his gauntlet to do bonus DPS. Afterward, Phil sadly orders Ridley to be reset by Mitch, who instead lets her go out of respect. Back at her house, Ridley uses a scan to fully replicate a gauntlet.
15	6	"Find the Glitch"	Hyunjoo Song	Dan Milano	Alice Herring, Grace Liu and Zane Yarbrough	August 17, 2020	117
With HQ under maintenance, Inspector-7 oversees the progress while the Bailley employees participate in a "Find the Glitch" game. As they play, Miko sidelines the focus into video montages and funny clip shows, and eventually everyone figures out Haneesh pulled the Glitch card. After the game ends, they're still locked in and start thinking someone is an actual glitch infiltrator. Since BITT has access to their gauntlet video recordings, they examine said recordings to determine which among them is the suspected Glitch. While the others point out trivial things between each other, when Miko again derails the topic of discussion, Mitch then draws suspicion on her. He points to her as the suspected Glitch and uses her reset immunity and 'inhuman' gaming skills as the prime examples, convincing the others enough that they all draw their sight on her. Five remembers their time together and points out that if she were a glitch, she's still their best friend. Immediately following this, Inspector-7 opens the door revealing the Glitch was Phil's pet "Kodama" and that they were locked in keep them from worsening the search. When Bergy inquired if nobody was really a Glitch, Inspector-7 ambiguously answers that "anything is possible".
16	7	"The Real Glitch Techs"	Chris Graham	Jennifer Bardekoff	Phil Jacobson, Sung Kim and Sarah Partington	August 17, 2020	201
Responding to a cluster of Kitty Glitches, an ultra-rare one heads into the neighboring town Dabney and Five captures it, despite being told not to poach Glitches that cross over into Dabney. Returning to HQ, Dabney manager Joan Fishback calls Phil about a "glitch poaching" but he defends his Techs, while Five's guilt builds and Mitch covers for him out of enjoying his predicament. When co-oping to catch the first of three new sludge Glitches, the Dabney Glitch Techs arrive to blatantly interfere in the Glitch capture and declare a turf war. As Five tries de-escalation, Mitch reciprocates the hostility and the Dabney Techs snipe the second and third sludge Glitches, so Zahra preps a hack as a retaliation. Zahra's hack releases the sludges, but as the two teams fight over who claims the Glitches, Five manifests the Glitch he took in confession, which is then eaten by the Mega Sludge he warned them about; now cooperating, both Tech teams derez the Glitch. When asking their managers about the "no poaching rule" Phil and Joan admit it is unspoken as they made it after Joan's Glitch pet "Kodama" was taken by Phil. Their issues settled, the Dabney and Bailley Techs move together to snag another Glitch.
17	8	"Settling the Score"	Chris Graham	Dan Milano	Phil Jacobson, Sung Eun Kim and Sarah Partington	August 17, 2020	205
After Miko gets trolled by new residents Ryu and Mike, she loses her cool seeing that one of them wiped out her high score on her favorite arcade game. After getting her new high score immediately outplayed again, she looks for Ryu thinking it was him. Arriving at Ryu's home, she instead meets Mike and learns it was really him who trounced her score. Enraged, Miko challenges Mike to settle the score game, spending hours on a single match trying to overtake the other. Not wanting to waste his day, Five leaves to do work while Miko obsessively continues, unintentionally causing an epic-tier "Code: Green" Glitch. All Glitch Techs from Bailley and Dabney mobilize against the 100-meter tall Glitch monsters. Five recognizes the characters Miko and Mike are playing, and climbs atop one to hijack a connection link to call Miko. Hearing Five, Miko realizes Mike is just like her when she was his age and stops, allowing her Glitch to derez, leaving the second open for capture, netting 100 billion shared XP for the Techs. Despite the antagonistic meeting, Mike and Miko decide to still play together. Five picks up Miko, happy she was able to let go of her grudge.
18	9	"I'm Mitch Williams"	Hyunjoo Song	Greg Nix	Etienne Guignard, Alice Herring and Grace Liu	August 17, 2020	120
When Mitch is locked out of a high level job, Zahra and Nix tell Five and Miko that the location is basically a regularly spawning Glitch XP Farm. Mitch petitions Phil for the job so the occupants aren't perma-banned by the "Tech Specialist", so Phil approves and advises debugging the house. Following Mitch, Five and Miko learn he resupplies the occupants, three of the "Furious Four", whenever they break their gaming tech. As Mitch explains himself, a root form Glitch manifests and the trio struggle to catch it, with only 15 minutes before the Tech Specialist arrives. After setting up a trap when cutting the power, but unaware of the backup generator, the Glitch grows to massive size. Five and Miko learn the house belongs to Mitch, the occupants are his siblings, and his job as a Glitch Tech strained their relationship. As Five and Miko are captured by the Glitch, and Mitch's siblings give him a pep talk about his being needed. Using modder-fobs, Mitch gives his siblings an "AR Experience" to help him capture the Glitch, and save Miko and Five. Presenting a "clean" home to the Specialist, The Willams siblings reconcile and start cleaning up their house.
19	10	"BITT Prime"	Chris Graham	Dan Milano and Sandeep Parikh	Sung Kim, Phil Jacobson and Sarah Partington	August 17, 2020	108
Returning from a sewer mission, Five and Miko find BITT lagging due to overcrowded memory and managing all of HQ's functions. To prevent Phil from replacing BITT, the duo take him to clear his memory, and find a massive hidden file titled "Coo-Pie-Caken". Unable to delete and mistakenly activating it, the duo track the rogue BITT, leaving Bergy to run Ops and deal with a roaming Fishwakka Glitch spawning. Pursuing assault mode BITT raiding cooking ingredients and unable to contain him, they resort to an E.M.P. Grenade, but instead trigger his "BITT Prime" form that continues his program. When Fishwakka eats Phil's lunch, he neutralizes all spawn copies, then calls Five and Miko for an update. Following BITT to Phil's house, he activates a hidden lab with the ingredients he took as an organic reaction key to retrieve a ROM cartridge. Miko mistakenly triggers the home security drones and Phil arrives to save them. With BITT's memory cleared and systems restored, Phil sends the duo back to HQ, and views the mysterious ROM's file: a recording of Phil's younger self telling him corporate wiped his memory, but he saved the recovered data from Hinobi R&D in case things get "glitchy".

=== Unproduced episodes ===
Title	Directed by	Written by	Storyboarded by	Prod. code
"Food Feud"	Hyunjoo Song	Ashly Burch and Deirdre Devlin	John Sanford	112
"Bolypius"	Phil Allora	Ashly Burch	Sung Park, Phil Jacobson, and Tony Craig	118
"Affection Gain"	Phil Allora	Tillery Johnson	Darrell Rooney	202
"Return to Castlestein"	Chris Graham	Tillery Johnson	Darrell Rooney	203
"Tower Defensive"	Phil Allora	Sandeep Parikh	Tony Craig	204
"Avatar: The Last Glitch Tech"	Phil Allora	Jen Bardekoff, Tillery Johnson and Dan Milano	John Sanford and Darrell Rooney	206
"Mobs and Minions"	Chris Graham	Dan Milano	Tony Craig	207
"Five's Gauntlet"	Phil Allora	Tillery Johnson	Tony Craig	208
"Glitchy Mutant Ninja Turtles"	Chris Graham	Sandeep Parikh and Dan Milano	TBA	209
"BITT 2.0"	Phil Allora	Tillery Johnson and Dan Milano	Norma Klinger	210

== Reception ==
The series received positive reception from critics and audiences. Emily Ashby of Common Sense Media called the series a "likable gaming-inspired show" that promotes diversity and teamwork. She also said that while there is a "fair amount of game-style violence" there is also "racial and cultural diversity" among the case and emphasis on how a shared mission and teamwork can help them "transcend their differences". She further praised the series for being "well-paced, sharply animated, and nicely suited" for gamers and those dabbling in VR.
