= Catherine Taber =

American actress

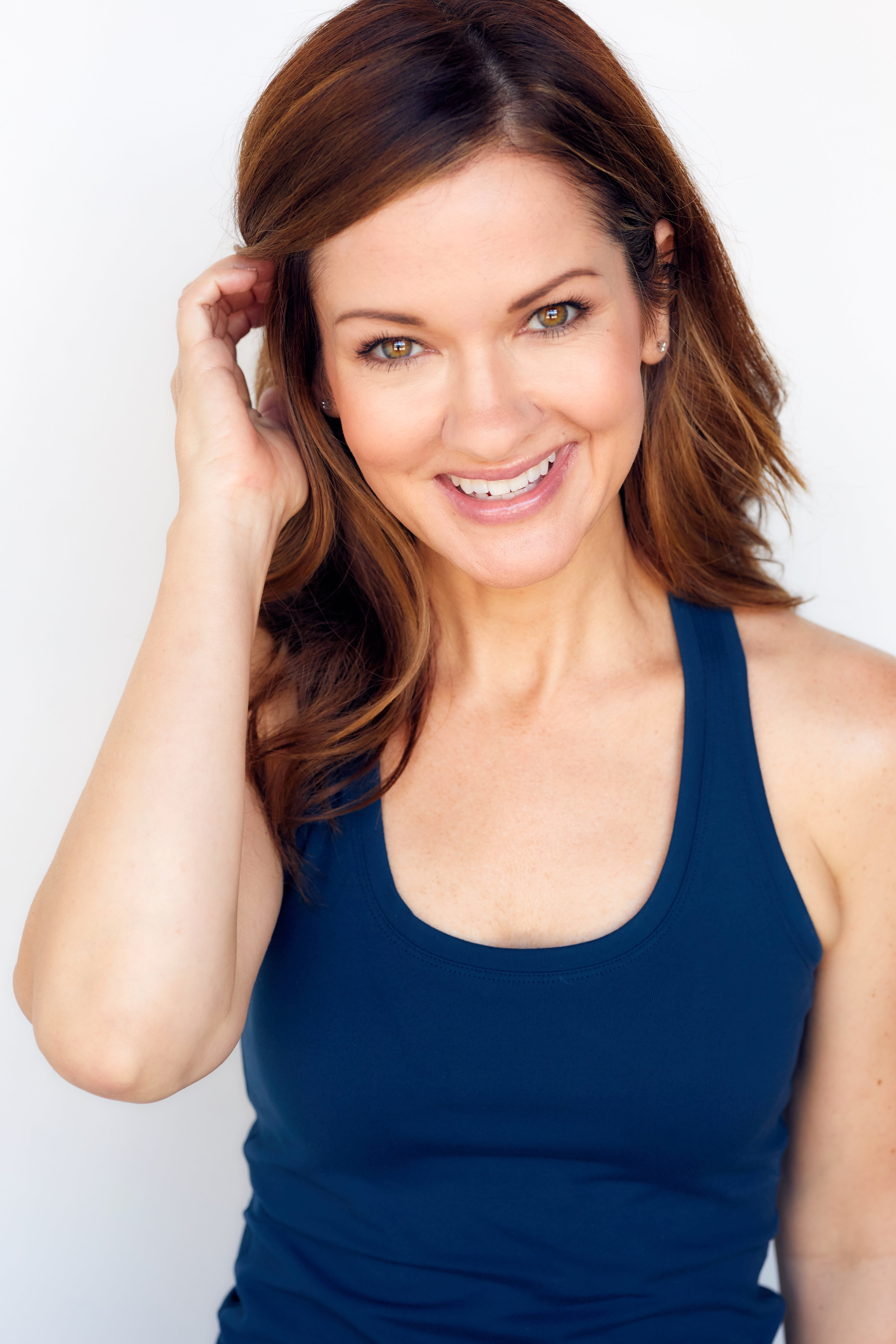
- Other name: Cat Taber
- Occupation: Actress
- Years active: 2000–present
- Website: cattaber.com

Catherine Taber is an American actress. She is known for voicing Padmé Amidala in Star Wars: The Clone Wars and Lori Loud and Katherine Mulligan on The Loud House. Taber is also known for her role as the protagonist Jesse (female) in Minecraft: Story Mode.

== Career ==
In 2000, Taber made her feature film debut starring alongside Soleil Moon Frye and Wil Wheaton in the coming of age dramedy The Girls' Room, where she and Frye play college roommates with contrasting lifestyles.

Taber got her break into video game voice-overs in Star Wars: Knights of the Old Republic in 2003, where she played Mission Vao. She voiced Penelo in Final Fantasy XII, for which she was nominated for a National Academy of Video Game Trade Reviewers (NAVGTR) Award for Supporting Role in a Drama in 2006.

She was the voice of Padmé Amidala in the Star Wars: The Clone Wars animated film and television series that aired on Cartoon Network from 2008 to 2014. Although she auditioned for the part, she credits her video game roles in the Star Wars universe as helping her become a fan and landing the part. She also voiced Amidala in the related Star Wars video games, as well as the character Vette in Star Wars: The Old Republic. She voiced Princess Leia in the Star Wars: Force Unleashed video games, and provided voices during production of the now cancelled animated comedy series Star Wars Detours. Meanwhile, in live-action roles, she had a starring role in the horror movie The Morningside Monster which screened at the Phoenix Film Festival in April 2014.

Outside of science fiction films and video games, she voiced Ginger the Pig in A Pig's Tail, an animated 2012 short film made by Aardman Animations for The Humane Society.

Since 2016, Taber has provided voice work on Nickelodeon's The Loud House, where she voices such characters as Lori Loud, Katherine Mulligan, and Girl Jordan.

Taber also voiced female Jesse in both seasons of the video game Minecraft: Story Mode (2015–17), which was first released by Telltale Games on October 12, 2015.

In 2021, Taber reprised her role as Katherine Mulligan from The Loud House in the live-action film A Loud House Christmas.

== Philanthropy ==
Taber runs a charity website called Games for Soldiers where she collects video game donations for U.S. soldiers overseas.

== Filmography ==
=== Animation ===
==== Television series ====
List of voice performances in animation
Year	Title	Role	Notes	Source
2004	Stroker and Hoop	Miss Hoe Cakes		
2008–14, 2020	Star Wars: The Clone Wars	Padmé Amidala, others		
2012–2022	Robot Chicken	Gadget Hackwrench, Various voices		
2012	Kick Buttowski: Suburban Daredevil	Kendall Perkins	Episode: "Rocked"	
2013	Mad	Various voices		
TBA	Star Wars Detours	Princess Leia		
2015	Bear in Underwear	Quinn		Tweet
2016	Guardians of the Galaxy	Medusa	2 episodes	
2016–present	The Loud House	Lori Loud, Girl Jordan, Katherine Mulligan, additional voices	Main role	
2016	Star Wars Rebels	Numa		
2016–2017	Avengers Assemble	Medusa, Vapor	4 episodes	
2017–18	Star Wars Forces of Destiny	Padmé Amidala, Child		
2018	Marvel Rising: Secret Warriors	Awkward Girl, S.H.I.E.L.D. Agent	Television film	
2019–2022	The Casagrandes	Lori Loud	6 episodes	
2020	Glitch Techs	Nancy	Episode: "Karate Trainer"	
2023–2024	My Adventures with Superman	Silver Banshee	4 episodes	
2025	Lego Marvel Avengers: Strange Tails	Tigra	Disney+ Television film	

==== Film ====
List of voice performances in feature films
Year	Title	Role	Notes	Source
2008	Star Wars: The Clone Wars	Padmé Amidala		
2009	Curious George 2: Follow That Monkey!	Tina		
2011	Waltz of the Demon King	Cosette	Short film Festival release	
2012	A Pig's Tail	Ginger	Short film for The Humane Society of the United States	
2014	We Wish You a Merry Walrus	Jangrah, DJ Cadence		
2015	Club Penguin: Monster Beach Party	Jangrah, DJ Cadence		
2015	Club Penguin: Halloween Panic!	Jangrah, DJ Cadence		
2015	Star Wars: The Force Awakens	Hangar Control Center Officer, Weapon Technician, additional voices		
2021	The Loud House Movie	Lori Loud		
2021	Seal Team	Seals		
2024	No Time to Spy: A Loud House Movie	Lori Loud		
2025	A Loud House Christmas Movie: Naughty or Nice	Lori Loud, Katherine Mulligan		

=== Video games ===
List of voice performances in video games
Year	Title	Role	Notes	Source
2003	Star Wars: Knights of the Old Republic	Mission Vao		
2005	X-Men Legends II: Rise of Apocalypse	Rogue		
2006	Final Fantasy XII	Penelo		
2006	Baten Kaitos Origins	Lolo		
2008	Star Wars: The Force Unleashed	Princess Leia		
2009	Star Wars: The Clone Wars – Republic Heroes	Padmé Amidala		
2009	Resistance: Retribution	Boilers		
2010	Resonance of Fate	Rebecca		
2010	Metal Gear Solid: Peace Walker	Cécile Cosima Caminades		
2010	Star Wars: The Force Unleashed II	Princess Leia		
2011	Lego Star Wars III: The Clone Wars	Padmé Amidala		
2011	Star Wars: The Old Republic	Vette		
2012	Resident Evil: Operation Raccoon City	Party Girl		
2012	The Secret World	Rose White, Cassandra King, Karen Olson, Saccharissa		
2013	Marvel Heroes	Rogue, Shanna the She-Devil		
2013	Teenage Mutant Ninja Turtles: Out of the Shadows	April O'Neil		
2015	Final Fantasy Type-0 HD	Andoria, others		
2015	Disney Infinity 3.0	Padmé Amidala		Tweet
2015	Minecraft: Story Mode	Jesse (Female)		
2016	Titanfall 2	Monarch Titan OS		Tweet
2017	Minecraft: Story Mode - Season Two	Jesse (Female)		
2018	Lego DC Super-Villains	Golden Glider		
2018	Spyro Reignited Trilogy	Zoe		
2021	Psychonauts 2	Norma		
2022	Tactics Ogre: Reborn	Deneb Rove		

=== Audiobooks ===
- Gods in Alabama (2005)
- Star Wars: Empire & Rebellion: Razor's Edge (2013)
- Gray Mountain (2014)
- Star Wars: Queen's Shadow (2019)
- Star Wars: Queen’s Peril (2020)
- Doctor Aphra: An Audiobook Original (2020)
- Star Wars: Queen’s Hope (2022)
- All Star Superman (2025)

=== Live-action film ===
List of acting performances in film
Year	Title	Role	Notes	Source
2000	The Girls' Room	Grace		
2014	A Stitch in Time (for $9.99)	Rebecca	Short film	
2014	The Morningside Monster	Mandy Jenkins	Film festival release	
2019	Haven's End	Allison		
2021	A Loud House Christmas	Katherine Mulligan	Television film	
