= Heidi Lynch =

Canadian actress

Heidi Lynch is a Canadian actress, most noted as a co-creator and co-star of the web series Avocado Toast.

A graduate of the University of Windsor, Lynch first met her collaborator Perrie Voss in 2015 when they acted together in a production of Peter Colley's play The Ghost Island Light. Lynch had recently come out as bisexual, while Voss was going through the recent announcement that her parents were divorcing, which ultimately formed the initial storyline for Avocado Toast.

She also appeared in the film The Drawer Boy, had a voice role in the animated short film A Pig's Tail, and has had guest roles in the television series Handsome Devils, Reign, Covert Affairs and Spinning Out.

Lynch is a two-time Canadian Screen Award nominee for Best Lead Performance in a Web Program or Series for Avocado Toast, receiving nods at the 9th Canadian Screen Awards in 2021 and at the 11th Canadian Screen Awards in 2023.

She is married to English actress Faye Marsay.
