= Greg the Bunny =

American TV sitcom

- The cover for the Greg the Bunny DVD
- Genre: Sitcom
- Created by: Steven Levitan; Spencer Chinoy; Dan Milano
- Starring: Eugene Levy; Seth Green; Bob Gunton; Sarah Silverman; Dina Waters; Drew Massey; Dan Milano
- Narrated by: Dan Milano (Fox version)
- Composers: John Adair; Steve Hampton (Fox version); Jay Lifton (IFC version)
- Country of origin: United States
- No. of seasons: 1 (+ 2 seasons of shorts)
- No. of episodes: 13 (+ 20 shorts)

Production
- Production location: Los Angeles
- Camera setup: Single camera; Film
- Running time: 30 minutes
- Production companies: Steven Levitan Productions; 20th Century Fox Television (Fox version); Moxie Pictures; Monkeys with Checkbooks (IFC version)

Original release
- Network: Fox (2002); IFC (2005–06)
- Release: March 27, 2002 – December 16, 2006

Greg the Bunny is an American television sitcom that originally aired on Fox in 2002. It starred Seth Green and a hand puppet named Greg the Bunny, a character originally created by the team of Sean Baker, Spencer Chinoy and Dan Milano. Milano and Chinoy wrote and co-produced the Fox show with Steven Levitan. The show was spun off from The Greg the Bunny Show, a series of short segments that aired on the Independent Film Channel, which were based on the public-access television cable TV show Junktape. A spin-off show, called Warren the Ape, premiered on June 14, 2010, on MTV.

== Plot ==
In the FOX show, Greg was the co-star of a children's television show called Sweetknuckle Junction. Like The Muppet Show, Greg the Bunny treated puppets as though they were real creatures within the reality of the show. Although in this show, they were treated as a racial minority (who prefer to be called by the politically correct term "fabricated Americans"), sometimes struggling against second-class citizenship.

== Characters ==
=== Humans ===
- Gilbert "Gil" Bender (played by Eugene Levy) – The overwhelmed TV producer and director of Sweetknuckle Junction and the father of Jimmy Bender. He expects Jimmy to succeed in his life.
- Jimmy Bender (played by Seth Green) – The human roommate of Greg the Bunny and the son of Gil Bender. He was a former swimming pool technician before he started working with his father where he hooked Greg up for a part on Sweetknuckle Junction. After Greg lands the part on the show, Jimmy becomes the production assistant to his father. In "SK-2.0," Jimmy temporarily became a creative consultant to help modernize the show. He went back to his production assistant job after "SK-2.0" caused the test audience children to have seizures and the network getting lawsuits from the parents of the children.
- Alison Kaiser (played by Sarah Silverman) – The network executive that Gil Bender works for. She used to work at PBS.
- Jack Mars (played by Bob Gunton) – An actor and Vietnam War veteran who plays Junction Jack, the railroad engineer host of Sweetknuckle Junction. Even though he has a distaste for puppets off-camera, Jack is the drinking buddy of Warren DeMontague and Count Frederick Blah.
- "Dottie" Sunshine (played by Dina Waters) – An actress who is the beautiful human co-host of Sweetknuckle Junction. She is more comfortable around most puppets than any other person. In "SK-2.0", Dottie wore a sexy outfit. When "SK-2.0" fails to pan out where it caused the children test audience to have seizures and the network getting lawsuits from the parents of the children, Dottie goes back to her original outfit. In "Jewel Heist," it is revealed that Dottie is allergic to bees. In "Greg Gets Puppish," it is revealed that Dottie had a puppet best friend growing up where Dottie later confesses that the puppet in question was her maid growing up.

=== Puppets ===
Many puppets have been used on the show. The ones exclusive to the show have been designed and built at Animated Engineering McAvene Designs. Several that appeared on the FOX show were reused from the children's direct-to-video series The Adventures of Timmy the Tooth, such as some members of the Gingivitis Gang appearing as background crew members.

- Greg the Bunny (performed by Dan Milano) – A rabbit who is the title character of the show. Greg underwent many changes throughout the course of his career. The original Greg had buttons for eyes and did not have a mouth. In the Fox series, he was given a moving mouth and plastic eyes for the later episodes. When Greg the Bunny returned to IFC, his button eyes were restored and he lost his moving mouth. On the show, he acts mostly as comic relief, and jokes are made at his expense (particularly by Warren) about how he cannot act and that he's just there to look cute. In the IFC series, he lives with Spencer and Sean. In the Fox series, he lives with Jimmy Bender. Jimmy was the one who got his father Gil to give Greg a job on Sweetknuckle Junction where he portrayed himself as the nephew to the former character Rochester Rabbit co-starring alongside Junction Jack, Dottie, Count Blah, and Warren DeMontague. In the MTV series spin-off Warren the Ape, Greg makes an appearance when Warren spends time with him to become sexually abstinent. However, it ends up with the clueless Greg being arrested as a pedophile and losing his virginity while in jail.
- Warren DeMontague (performed by Dan Milano) – A helmet-wearing ape of indeterminate species who is the second main character on the show later starring in his own series Warren the Ape. He is the only character who uses a separate character name on Sweetknuckle Junction playing Professor Ape. He portrays himself as a veteran stage actor trying to make a new name for himself while having several substance-related vices. He initially despises working with Greg the Bunny because of his lack of stage experience. Warren has an agent named Maury who Warren tends to call up for any acting opportunities.
- Fredrick "Count Blah" Blah (performed by Dan Milano in the IFC show, Drew Massey on the FOX show) – A vampire who is another actor that had worked with Warren DeMontague many years ago. He is a parody of Count von Count of Sesame Street. In the IFC series, Spencer often asks Blah when directing to stop saying "Blah." This makes Blah very upset, as he insists that Blah is his gimmick. Blah was another puppet who underwent changes between series. In the IFC series, he has lighter skin and smaller eyes than he does on the Fox show and his hands are those of the assistant puppeteers.
- Tardy Turtle (performed by Victor Yerrid) – A turtle exclusive to the FOX show. He is portrayed as slow (hence his name), in the sense that he is regularly late as well as likely being mentally handicapped and often saying non sequiturs ("Crayons taste like purple," "... the green ones make me horny," "... drumsticks can also be chicken") in a similar manner of Ralph Wiggum from The Simpsons. Tardy also ends some of his sentences or when he is frightened with a high-pitched squeal much like Leonardo DiCaprio's character in What's Eating Gilbert Grape. When FOX cancelled the series, the puppet was "stolen" and FOX claimed copyright to it. A puppet that resembles Tardy makes an appearance in one of the pre-episode audio introductions on the IFC DVD.
- Susan Monster (performed by James Murray) – A full-bodied furry purple monster with six breasts and a male voice who is exclusive to the FOX series. She works as an office worker at the network where Sweetknuckle Junction is filmed. In "Welcome to Sweetknuckle Junction," Susan was among the puppets who auditioned for Rochester Rabbit's part. In "Surprise," Susan is revealed to have a habit of eating stray cats. When FOX cancelled the series, they claimed copyright to Susan Monster's puppet.
- Rochester Rabbit (performed by James Murray) – A gruff rabbit born in 1946 who was the previous puppet host of Sweetknuckle Junction for 15 years until he was fired due to forgetting his lines at his age and was replaced by Greg the Bunny. He is mentioned to have 43 kids. After Greg the Bunny landed Rochester's part on Sweetknuckle Junction as Rochester's nephew, Rochester crashed the filming of the show and threatened to cut him up with scissors only for him to be knocked out by Jimmy during the on-set skirmish between Warren and Jack. In "Rabbit Redux," Greg's recurring nightmares of Rochester burying him alive causes Greg to want to patch things up with him. Greg and Jack find Rochester selling Stars Maps with Jack hoping to get back the meatloaf pan that Rochester borrowed from him. Rochester rants about how Greg stealing his part on Sweetknuckle Junction caused him to lose his home and go broke. Greg convinced Gil to rehire Rochester which resulted in Rochester being hired as a janitor. Greg even fakes an injury so that Rochester can get a part on the Thanksgiving episode of Sweetknuckle Junction, where he dances during one of the musical numbers until he suddenly dies from a heart attack. During the memorial service/roast, some jokes are made about Rochester followed by a presentation where Rochester got hurt during each episode. When it came to Warren's talk about Rochester, the cigar that was placed in Rochester's dead mouth started to burn Rochester's dead body.
- Cranky (performed by Victor Yerrid) – A crew member who is often annoyed at things. He is a recycled version of Cavity Goon from The Adventures of Timmy the Tooth.
- Dr. Aben Mitchell (performed by Drew Massey) – The leader of the Pro-Puppet Movement and an advocate on Puppet Rights. Being a Live-Hand Puppet, Massey is assisted in performing him by James Murray.
- Gay Bear (performed by Drew Massey) – A bear that acts gay. He was among the puppets that auditioned for Rochester Rabbit's part on Sweetknuckle Junction in the episode "Welcome to Sweetknuckle Junction".
- Mr. Hygiene (performed by Victor Yerrid)
- Hurbada Hymena (performed by Drew Massey) – The leader of the militant puppet group called International Puppets Alliance.
  - Mushma and Ratagaba (performed by James Murray and Drew Massey) – Two members of the International Puppets Alliance that work for Hurbada. Mushma is a furry one-eyed monster and Ratagaba is a tall-headed goat-like creature.
- Crippled Writer (performed by Victor Yerrid) – A leg brace-wearing writer at the network who is exclusive to the FOX series. In "The Singing Mailman," the Crippled Writer's forearm crutches were once stolen by Leo Kornelly after he had a fall and nobody has come to help the Crippled Writer up.
- Jamaican Guy (performed by James Murray) – A Jamaican puppet who provides the piano music for Sweetknuckle Junction. Similar to Count Blah saying "Blah," Jamaican Guy says "Mon" at the end of his sentences as seen in "Dottie Heat" during their card game with Warren, Jack, a dog puppet, and an unnamed crew member.
- The Wumpus (performed by Dan Milano) – A monster exclusive to the IFC show. He is a parody of the Sesame Street Monsters and is very clumsy. The Wumpus, created by Chris Bergoch, first appeared in the early nineties in a Bergoch short.
- Pal Friendlies (performed by Dan Milano) – A character exclusive to the IFC show. He is the talent agent for all the puppets who work on the show, albeit a very ineffective one. He also doubles as a lawyer in some episodes.
- Elephant Man (performed by Paul McGinnis) – A puppet character modeled after Joseph Merrick, exclusive to the IFC show.

== Background and production ==
Junktape was a half-hour, bi-weekly public access series created by Sean S. Baker, Spencer Chinoy, and Dan Milano. Airing on New York City's Manhattan Neighborhood Network, Monday nights at 11:30 pm, the show eventually got the attention of the Independent Film Channel and was given its own series of regular segments starring one of the main characters from Junktape, Greg the Bunny. The Greg the Bunny Show on IFC involved Greg and other characters introducing independent films being screened by using skits that parodied the films.

The Fox show made its debut in March 2002. Following declining ratings, Fox canceled the show in May 2002. From June to August 2002, Fox burned off the remaining episodes, with two episodes unaired. Its failure was largely ascribed to the showrunner and networks' seeming cluelessness as to the direction they wanted the show to take. The network promoted Greg the Bunny as a puppet show for adults, but within the show itself, they insisted on toning down its edgier aspects. The creators felt these changes caused the show to lose something, and gave it much more of a traditional sitcom feel. The showrunner and the network also wanted to focus the show more on the human cast, while the creators maintained that the puppets were the heart of the show. Despite these problems, the series acquired a significant cult following, and was eventually released on DVD in 2004.

In August 2005, the series returned to IFC, in a series of short segments, spoofing both old and new films, including Annie Hall, Miller's Crossing, Barton Fink, Fargo, Blue Velvet, Easy Rider and Pulp Fiction. The cast for these segments primarily features puppets Greg and Warren Demontague, with appearances from Count Blah, new character Pal Friendlies, and returning character The Wumpus. However, Tardy the Turtle and Susan were unable to appear, as they belong to FOX.

== Reception ==
Greg the Bunny received mixed reviews. For Entertainment Weekly, Ken Tucker graded the show with a C− and criticized the writing and character development: "Every actor's skills are squandered on stereotypes." Anita Gates of The New York Times found the show to be "pretty political" and questioned if viewers would "see the show as refreshingly honest or as prejudice hiding behind humor." E! "TV Scoop" writer Kimberly Potts found "a few clever moments" but concluded the pilot episode was "nothing groundbreaking". The Los Angeles Times, however, had a more positive review considering the show's premise to be unique. Eric Deggans also was laudatory, writing for the St. Petersburg Times that the show "sandwiches adult situations into a kiddie format" and called it "hilariously adult-oriented satire". Salon critic Carina Chocano believed the show's premise to be "flagrantly stupid...in a good way" but criticized the casting, for instance finding Silverman to be "woefully limited" as Allison in contrast to her past work including "un-p.c. jokes". TV Guide, however, was more complimentary of the casting including Silverman, whose character "looks like she knows what she's doing as she pulls the strings of her subordinate Gil," wrote Steve Robinson.

The debut episode on March 27, 2002, had 10.1 million viewers and was Fox's second most watched show of the week. On March 31, the second episode had 9.1 million viewers in a special Sunday 8:30 p.m. slot, losing about two million viewers from its lead-in The Simpsons. However, average viewership declined to about seven million by late April 2002.

In 2004, Sitcoms Online rated the complete series DVD 4.5 out of five stars.

== Episodes ==
The episodes appear in production code order on the DVD release.

=== Unaired pilot ===
No.	Title	Original release date	Prod. code
0	"Pilot"	Unaired	1AEV79
Reworked and aired as "Welcome to Sweetknuckle Junction."

=== Series (2002–2004) ===
No.	Title	Original release date	Prod. code
1	"Welcome to Sweetknuckle Junction"	March 27, 2002	1AEV01
Greg goes in for an assistant's job at Sweetknuckle Junction and walks out with a starring role after Rochester Rabbit is let go from the production. Cameo appearance: David Spade makes a cameo when Greg the Bunny arrives at the network where "Sweetknuckle Junction" was being filmed. Jeffrey Ross also makes a cameo as a security guard.
2	"SK-2.0"	March 31, 2002	1AEV04
When the show bombs with a children's focus group, Alison plans changes and Jimmy's ideas for an updated version of "Sweetknucle Junction" called "SK-2.0" just might be the trick like a use for a green screen, Greg the Bunny becoming G the B, Count Blah becoming Count A'ight, Warren portraying Prof Meister Ape, making Junction Jack a cyborg called Cybo-Jack, and Dottie showing off her sex appeal.
3	"Jewel Heist"	April 3, 2002	1AEV11
Greg is jealous when Jimmy gets a new love interest named Chelsea (Lindsay Sloane) whose dog Winston is quite aggressive to Greg. Meanwhile, Alison, Dottie, and Susan revolt when Gil doesn't invite them to a paintball weekend with an intense instructor (David Koechner).
4	"Greg Gets Puppish"	April 10, 2002	1AEV09
Hurbada Hymena orders Greg to familiarize himself with puppish culture to the detriment of the show. Greg is later asked by Hurbada to speak at the National Puppet Convention.
5	"The Singing Mailman"	April 17, 2002	1AEV12
Dottie is blackmailed by a Goodwill worker name Leo Kornelly (Michael McDonald) who has a dirty tape of her doing something sexual to MC Hammer's "U Can't Touch This" upon finding it in a box of junk that she gave him. Leo plans to post it on the internet if she can't get him a role on "Sweetknuckle Junction." After telling Greg about it, Dottie works to get Gil to cast Leo as a Singing Mailman on "Sweetknuckle Junction." After Gil fires Leo for the mess-up, Greg tells Jimmy, Jack, Count Blah, Warren, and Tardy about Dottie's plight causing them to take action to get the tape back. Meanwhile, Gil and Alison deal with the hamster puppets going on strike when they have been denied a couch for their hamster wheel.
6	"Rabbit Redux"	April 24, 2002	1AEV06
Greg feels guilty for stealing Rochester Rabbit's job on "Sweetknuckle Junction" after having recurring nightmares of Rochester Rabbit burying him alive. So Greg wants to patch things up. When Rochester Rabbit dies of a heart attack during the musical number for the Thanksgiving episode of "Sweetknuckle Junction," Greg feels down about it as everyone holds a memorial service for him which also doubles as a roast. Meanwhile, Jimmy wants to score with Alison and does this by flirting with Susan Monster. Note: Chris Bergoch makes an uncredited cameo as an attendee at Rochester Rabbit's funeral.
7	"Surprise!"	May 29, 2002	1AEV10
Alison tries to fool a TV Guide reporter named Laura Carlson (Sasha Alexander) into believing that the cast is a happy, functional family in hopes of getting on the cover. While throwing a surprise party for Jack, Greg finds out that Laura has a crush on Alison.
8	"Father & Son Reunion"	June 5, 2002	1AEV07
Father/son relations between Jimmy and Gil are damaged when Gil doesn't tell Jimmy that his parents' marriage is over when he encounters his mom Sandy (Julie Hagerty) making out with Jimmy's old gym teacher Coach Don Dinkins (Charles Rocket) outside the coffeehouse. Meanwhile, Warren starts his one-man show.
9	"Piddler on the Roof"	July 28, 2002	1AEV05
Believing that Alison won't let him do Shakespeare on the show, an angry Warren takes a leak in her open convertible. Warren then auditions to play Claudius to Gary Oldman's Hamlet.
10	"Blah Bawls"	August 4, 2002	1AEV13
Warren can't get over his ex-wife Maggie (Marilu Henner) and Count Blah can't get over his dead wife Maldora Blah....until he meets Maggie. Meanwhile, Alison is being stalked and suspects Jack upon telling him that he can't play the hooker-killing conductor Locomotive Louie in the upcoming horror film "Helping Hand Station."
11	"Dottie Heat"	August 8, 2002	1AEV03
After doing a duet with Dottie by singing "The Friendship Song" when Marty the Skunk got food poisoning, Greg develops a crush on Dottie. Dottie is later crushed when she overhears Greg lying to the gang and tells them that he did the nasty with her. Meanwhile, Jimmy finds that Alison is dating another man. At the same time, Count Blah plays a game of cards with Jack, Warren, the Jamaican Guy, a puppet dog, and an unnamed human crew member.
12	"Sock Like Me"	October 19, 2004 (on IFC)	1AEV02
During "Puppet History Month," somebody writes the "S" word ("sock") in the insultive message about Greg the Bunny in the men's room. To keep her superiors from retaliating, Alison forces the human and puppet staff to undergo puppet sensitivity training overseen by Dr. Aben Mitchell.
13	"Jimmy Drives Gil Crazy"	October 19, 2004 (on IFC)	1AEV08
Jimmy feels unloved when Gil yells at him about what a production assistant is supposed to do. While going to clean up poop in the back of Warren's house, Jimmy stumbles upon a teenager named Amy (Alicia Leigh Willis) skinny-dipping in Warren's swimming pool and uses Warren's house to impress her. While sleeping in Warren's car which was loaned to Jimmy, Greg meets Corey Feldman who is annoyed with having Warren as his bad neighbor and takes his car which leads to a police chase.

=== IFC shorts (2005) ===
Greg the Bunny returned as a series of 12-minute shorts that aired on IFC, starting in August 2005.

No. overall	No. in season	Title	Original release date
1	1	"Bunnie Hall"	August 19, 2005
Greg falls for a beautiful (live) lobster. An extended reference to Woody Allen's Annie Hall.
2	2	"The 13th Step"	August 26, 2005
Warren tells the show's creators that he is going to Martha's Vineyard with his wife Maggie, but he actually goes to a lonely room at the Carter Hotel. There, Warren obsesses over calling his wife, with whom he is in a trial separation. A homage to the Coen Brothers' Barton Fink.
3	3	"Sleazy Rider"	September 2, 2005
Greg, Warren, and the crew are tired of working for 'the man' and hit the road in search of real America. A homage to Easy Rider.
4	4	"Dead Puppet Storage"	September 9, 2005
A behind-the-scenes look as the crew struggle to shoot Warren, Count Blah, and Greg applying their lauded acting talents to perform their favorite Pulp Fiction scenes.
5	5	"Blah!"	September 16, 2005
Greg runs into his idol puppet actor Frederick "Count" Blah. He befriends the washed-up vampire and gives him a part on the show.
6	6	"You Know, For Kids!"	September 23, 2005
Homage to Coen Brothers films Fargo and The Big Lebowski as Greg and Warren attempt to defraud IFC by staging an inept kidnapping plot. Also features a nod to the thriller Seven with the Wumpus playing the role of Kevin Spacey's character John Doe.
7	7	"The Addiction"	September 30, 2005
After watching vampire movie The Addiction, Greg becomes convinced he's been bitten by a vampire.
8	8	"The Blues, She Is My Friend"	October 7, 2005
This black-and-white prison movie, inspired by the Jim Jarmusch film Down by Law, features Greg and Warren as prison inmates who learn that show biz is the worst prison of all.
9	9	"2001-1 Space & Stuff"	October 14, 2005
This ambitious homage to Stanley Kubrick and 2001: A Space Odyssey features Greg and Warren as astronauts on a mission to Jupiter.
10	10	"Sex, Button Eyes, and a Video Ape"	October 21, 2005
While Greg the Bunny and Seth Green are shooting a public service announcement (PSA), a creepy technician (played by Warren the Ape) tries to get the two actors involved in pornography. An homage to Auto Focus.
11	11	"Martian Serum 7 From Mars"	October 28, 2005
Along the lines of Ed Wood, young, enthusiastic Greg seeks to make a short film about his idol, the great Count Blah.
12	12	"Naturally Sewn Killers"	November 4, 2005
Warren snaps pulling Greg with him as he launches into a maniacal Natural Born Killers-esque spree.
13	13	"Daddyhood"	November 11, 2005
This loving tribute to David Lynch's Eraserhead features Greg the Bunny as a lonely father to a baby potato.
14	14	"The Godpappy"	November 18, 2005
Violent and gripping, this homage to The Godfather features Count Blah as the Don, Warren the Ape as Tom Hagen, Gary the Bunny as Sonny, Marc Grass as Solazzo, and Greg the Bunny as Michael.

=== IFC shorts (2006) ===
No. overall	No. in season	Title	Original release date
15	1	"Wumpus the Monster"	November 11, 2006
This parody of "Monster" explores what it means to be a monster puppet. When Greg befriends the Wumpus out of pity, he gets more than he bargained for.
16	2	"Sockville"	November 18, 2006
After being knocked unconscious, Greg dreams of visiting the town of Dogville, a town defined by chalk outlines in a black void.
17	3	"Blue Velveteen"	November 25, 2006
Greg suspects Warren of Wumpus' murder and decides to use his boy detective skills to investigate in a spoof of David Lynch films, namely Blue Velvet, as well as his Twin Peaks series.
18	4	"Plush: Behind the Seams"	December 2, 2006
A rockumentary on Greg and Warren's band Plush, one of the few all-puppet pop groups.
19	5	"Wacky Wednesday"	December 9, 2006
In this parody of Being John Malkovich, Greg buys a magical Aztec dog skull from a curio shop in Chinatown.
20	6	"The Passion of the Easter Bunny: Fabricated American Movie"	December 16, 2006
Hoping to ride on Mel Gibson's coattails, Greg decides to direct and star in a biblical epic motion picture.

== Home media ==
The original "Greg the Bunny: The Complete Series" DVD was released October 19, 2004.

The IFC series was partially released as "Greg the Bunny: Best of the Film Parodies" October 24, 2006.

The remainder of the IFC series released as "The Passion of Greg the Bunny: Best of the Film Parodies, Vol. 2" May 6, 2008.

== Appearances in other shows ==
- Greg the Bunny made a guest segment on Mad TV (episode 719, aired 2002): in it, Greg, the jaded pro, deals with an audition for a minor part from his psychotic first drama teacher.
- Greg the Bunny appeared in the Duel Masters episode "Kokujo Strikes Back." He was portrayed as the world's second-best duelist.
- An original Greg the Bunny short was created by Dan Milano for the 100th episode of the podcast "Star Wars Action News". While no other puppets were featured, the skit showed Greg playing with his favorite Star Wars action figures. Creator Dan Milano also was featured in a second, separate, video segment.
- Footage of the show can be seen in Sean Baker's Starlet and The Florida Project.
