= Star Wars Detours =

Unaired animated television series

- Genre: Comic science fiction
- Created by: George Lucas
- Based on: Star Wars by George Lucas
- Written by: Brendan Hay
- Directed by: Todd Grimes
- Voices of: Seth Green; Dee Bradley Baker; Anthony Daniels; Ahmed Best; Billy Dee Williams; Seth MacFarlane; Felicia Day; Zachary Levi; Catherine Taber; Cree Summer; Donald Faison; Nat Faxon; Zeb Wells; Tom Sheppard; Dan Milano; Joel McHale; "Weird Al" Yankovic
- Composer: Michael A. Levine (based on themes by John Williams)
- Country of origin: United States
- Original language: English
- No. of seasons: 2
- No. of episodes: 39 (produced)

Production
- Executive producers: George Lucas; Seth Green; Matthew Senreich
- Producers: Seth Green; Matthew Senreich
- Production companies: Stoopid Buddy Stoodios; Lucasfilm Animation

Original release
- Release: September 22, 2026

Star Wars Detours is an unaired American animated comedy series. It is differentiated from the other Star Wars animated series in that it is a parody of the franchise. It followed a comedic take on the events between the prequel trilogy (Episodes I–III) and the original trilogy (Episodes IV–VI). The series was produced by Lucasfilm Animation in collaboration with Robot Chicken creators Seth Green and Matthew Senreich. Although 39 episodes of the show were produced, their release has been on hold since 2013, following Disney's acquisition of Lucasfilm. A curated selection of episodes is publicly available to view at George Lucas's Lucas Museum of Narrative Art.

== Cast and crew ==
Voice actors that were involved in the show included Dee Bradley Baker, Abraham Benrubi, Ahmed Best as Jar Jar Binks, Anthony Daniels as C-3PO, Felicia Day, Donald Faison, Nat Faxon, Seth Green as Obi-Wan Kenobi, Jennifer Hale, Zachary Levi, Joel McHale, Breckin Meyer, Dan Milano, Andy Richter as Zuckuss, Cree Summer, Catherine Taber as Princess Leia, Billy Dee Williams as Lando Calrissian, "Weird Al" Yankovic as 4-LOM, Grey DeLisle, and Seth MacFarlane as Emperor Palpatine.

Writers for the series included Dan Milano, Tom Root, Tom Sheppard, Zeb Wells, Doug Goldstein, Breckin Meyer, Kevin Shinick, David A. Goodman, Michael Price, and Jane Espenson. Brendan Hay served as head writer.

== Cancelled release ==
Footage of the series debuted at Star Wars Celebration VI in mid-2012; it was planned to be set between the events of Star Wars: Episode III – Revenge of the Sith and Episode IV – A New Hope. In March 2013, Lucasfilm postponed the release of the series, after reconsidering whether a comedy series would be a sensible way to introduce the franchise to new fans, when a sequel trilogy was being produced. That September, Green said 39 episodes had been completed, with 62 additional scripts finished.

In October 2015, during a live stream of Life Is Strange, Day mentioned that the show had been canceled. In June 2018, Lucasfilm filed a new trademark for the series.

In November 2020, a six-minute episode, "Dog Day Afternoon", was leaked onto the internet. The episode features Zuckuss and 4-LOM (voiced by Richter and Yankovic) attempting to rob Dexter's Diner. Lando Calrissian, Boba Fett, and Jabba the Hutt also appear. The episode was taken down shortly after it was leaked.

In June 2021, Entertainment Weekly asked Green if he knew when the show might be released. He replied, "The most recent conversations I've had with anybody who would be in a position to say so say that it's not soon. ... the way it's been explained to me is that there hasn't been enough interest high enough up to go through what it would take to put it out, and that there isn't an interest in releasing this content on Disney+ from Lucasfilm."

In March 2022, Yankovic revealed that he and other cast members had recorded original songs for the series, with the cancelled third season planned to feature a musical.

In 2023, Space.com opined that Star Wars lacked an official comedy motion picture, noting that the release of Detours would fill that void, exposed by Star Trek's 2020 adult animated series, Lower Decks.

At 2025's Star Wars Celebration Japan, a Lucasfilm Animation retrospective poster was released, featuring a stormtrooper from the series among the studio's wide array of projects. Collider cited this as the first official acknowledgement of the series in over a decade.

In July 2026, Green revealed at San Diego Comic-Con that a curated selection of episodes would be showcased at George Lucas's upcoming Lucas Museum of Narrative Art.

== See also ==
- "The Saga Begins" – song by "Weird Al" Yankovic
- Tag and Bink – parody comic book characters
- "Yoda" – song by "Weird Al" Yankovic
