= The Girls' Room =

- Directed by: Irene Turner
- Written by: Amanda L. Beall
- Produced by: Carol Ann Shine; Barclay DeVeau; Irene Turner
- Starring: Soleil Moon Frye; Wil Wheaton; Catherine Taber
- Edited by: Jeff Betancourt; Robert C. Winn
- Music by: Alan Ari Lazar
- Production companies: Oil & Water Productions
- Release date: 3 March 2000
- Running time: 101 minutes
- Country: United States
- Language: English

The Girls' Room (alternate title Best of Enemies) is a 2000 comedy-drama film. It is the first film by director Irene Turner.

== Plot ==
Mismatched college roommates Casey and Grace struggle to get along. Casey wears black and has an attitude because she has always had to struggle, while conservative and proper Grace has a family with money and will marry Charlie when she graduates. Believing Casey is sabotaging her life, Grace plots revenge, dating Casey's friend Joey and pretending to be interested in Casey's life.

== Cast ==
- Soleil Moon Frye as Casey
- Wil Wheaton as Charlie
- Catherine Taber as Grace
- Gary Wolf as Joey
- Michelle Brookhurst as Paige
- Crystall Carmen as Sweetie
- Julianna McCarthy as Nana
- Lela Lee as Chloe
- Torie Lynch as Beth

== Production ==
Much of the filming was done at Wake Forest University in Winston-Salem, North Carolina.

== Reception ==
In Variety, Lael Loewenstein called the film a "humorous tale of difference and tolerance" and said "[w]inning, intimate performances" by the female stars "anchor the film and help smooth over its occasional lapses in logic." He said the main characters are well developed and neither totally likeable nor always hateful. He described production values as "sharp".
