= Vette (Star Wars) =

Character from Star Wars

- Star Wars character
- Promotional concept art of Vette for Star Wars: The Old Republic.
- First appearance: Star Wars: The Old Republic (2011)
- Created by: BioWare
- Voiced by: Catherine Taber

In-universe information
- Species: Twi'lek
- Homeworld: Ryloth

Ce'na, better known by her alias Vette, is a fictional character in BioWare's massively multiplayer online role-playing game Star Wars: The Old Republic. The starting companion for players who select the Sith Warrior class, Vette is a Twi'lek, a humanoid species within the Star Wars's universe known for the twin tentacular appendages that protrude from the back of their heads. As the player character's slave, Vette comes with a shock collar that the player may either remove, or utilize to torture her. She is voiced by Catherine Taber.

Vette's character has received a mixed response. While she is popular with players and her characterization is generally well received, the moral implications of the player character abusing her via the shock collar has been met with criticism and controversy.

== Concept and design ==
Vette is developed as a selectable companion character for the Sith Warrior class from the player's pool of allies in The Old Republic. Companions are fully-functional characters directed by artificial intelligence, who are capable of fighting by the player's side through much of the single player content for The Old Republic, and joining multiplayer parties to fill in for other players who have to take their leave mid-session when necessary. Vette may also be instructed to craft items as a companion. Her appearance can be customised by the player, a feature intended to help make each player's companions feel unique despite the MMO nature of The Old Republic.

The Sith Warrior storyline, in which Vette is introduced as the player character's first companion, was written by Neil Pollner. Pillner described the class fantasy as one in which the player begins as the apprentice of a powerful Sith Lord and may either indulge destructive impulses, build a personal power base, or pursue less wanton or even redemptive routes through the Empire, so long as their master's larger objectives are met. In one storyline, the player is sent to kill Beezlit Grathan, a rival Sith acolyte, and may then encounter Beezlit's mother, Lady Grathan, who propositionally rewards the Sith Warrior after her husband is killed and if her son is spared. The player would have to choose whether Vette, as their enslaved companion, is allowed to leave or forced to remain present for the sexual encounter. Pollner apparently saw the Lady Grathan encounter as an extreme expression of that class fantasy and expected it to be cut, and was surprised that it remained in the game after ratings review.

Writer Sean McKeever said Vette's history of enslavement informed the resigned attitude with which she initially enters the Sith Warrior's service, while her independence and willingness to speak openly were retained as central elements of her characterization. He explained that travelling with the Warrior recalls the freedom Vette experienced as a treasure hunter and provides the basis for their relationship to develop into a close partnership. Although her opposition to cruelty, oppression and anti-alien prejudice places her at odds with the Sith Empire, McKeever considered her criminal background and willingness to cross moral boundaries sufficient to create areas of common interest with a Sith protagonist.

Prior to The Old Republic update 4.0 patch released on October 20, 2015, the nature of Vette's relationship with the player character was measured numerically as "Affection" and could be altered depending on whatever decisions are made; this mechanic has since been replaced with "Influence", which also builds when a player makes meaningful decisions with companions but is not a determinant as to whether they like the player character or not.

=== Portrayal ===
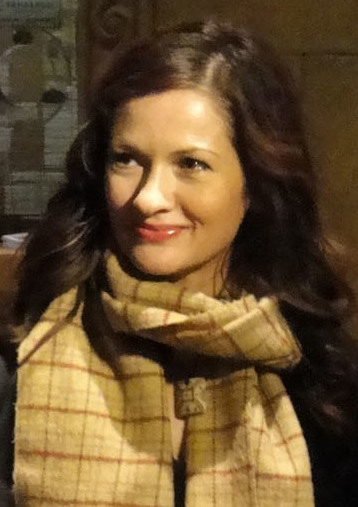
Catherine Taber voiced Vette.

Catherine Taber, a self-described Star Wars fan, voices Vette. She was offered the role without being required to go through an audition. Taber and BioWare had a clear vision on what Vette would be, and wanted to use her to infuse the game with traditional Star Wars humour. In an interview with Club Jade, Taber described Vette as a smart, sarcastic, and quirky character who added "fresh air to the dark side", and said she drew on aspects of Indiana Jones while developing the performance. Taber also distinguished Vette from Mission Vao, her earlier Twi'lek role in Star Wars: Knights of the Old Republic, describing Mission as younger and more innocent while characterizing Vette as wiser, more self-aware, and tougher. In a separate interview with MediaMikes, Taber said she had previously worked with BioWare on Knights of the Old Republic, was later invited back for The Old Republic, and publicly announced at Comic-Con International that she was voicing Vette.

In a later interview with Geeks Under Grace, Taber said she viewed Vette, Mission Vao, and Numa as sharing Twi'lek traits shaped by a history of occupation and hardship, including optimism, resilience, and feistiness.

== Appearances ==
Vette is introduced near the beginning of the Sith Warrior storyline after being imprisoned while raiding the tomb of a Sith Lord on Korriban. Fitted with a shock collar, she is assigned to guide the Warrior through the tomb and recover a relic required for the Warrior's final trial. She subsequently becomes the Warrior's first companion. The player may remove her collar and free her or continue treating her as a slave, with the latter choice allowing the Warrior to shock her during subsequent interactions.

Through conversations with Vette, the Warrior learns that she was sold into slavery as a child and passed between several owners before being freed by the crime lord Nok Drayen. She later became a pirate and treasure hunter, travelling with a group of Twi'leks and searching for culturally significant artifacts while attempting to locate her missing family. During her companion storyline, the Warrior reunites Vette with members of her former group and helps investigate her family's fate. Vette discovers that her mother has died but locates her sister, after which the player may encourage her either to abandon or pursue revenge. If the player selects a male Sith Warrior, Vette may also develop a romantic relationship with him.

== Reception ==
Vette is generally popular with The Old Republic players. A 2012 fan poll by IGN placed Vette as the fourth favourite of all Old Republic companions. According to player infographics released by BioWare in celebration of The Old Republic's fifth anniversary, Vette along with Lana Beniko were the most recruited companions as of July 2016.

Larry Everett from Massively Overpowered claimed that Vette is "almost universally liked" by players, singling out her quirky personality, sense of adventure, and the quality of Taber's performance for praise. He also suggested that Vette's popularity may be connected to nostalgia, as Taber's earlier character from Knights of the Old Republic Mission Vao was another fan favorite. Spanish outlet MeriStation likewise discussed Vette in the context of BioWare's romance writing, identifying her as an example of how the studio integrated companion relationships into player-character development. The feature emphasized that Vette begins as the Sith Warrior's slave, may be freed or kept captive, and that her romance arc gradually reveals her family history, trauma, and interest in preserving culturally significant Twi'lek artifacts. Rolando Gutierrez from Gamers Decide assessed Vette to be overall the best companion and romance option for the Sith Warrior based on multiple criteria, including her personality, gameplay utility, and the quality of her romance subplot.

GameZone's Andrew Clouther used Vette as an example of how The Old Republic 's dark side oriented character arcs not only "tempts you with evil, but tests your ability to DO evil", and praised the game for its ability to affect players and challenge their consciences. Kotaku's Phil Owen drew attention to the Lady Grathan scene with Vette and acknowledged that while it is "messed up", BioWare allowing players to act evil is a big reason why he holds the game in high regard. MeriStation later cited the same Lady Grathan sequence in a feature on sadistic choices in video games, describing the player character's ability to disregard Vette's objection and compel her to remain present as an example of the unusually cruel interactions available in The Old Republic.

=== Shock collar controversy ===
Mike Fahey of Kotaku discussed Vette in a January 2012 article about the darker choices available to Sith Warrior players. Fahey described Vette as the Sith Warrior's Twi'lek companion and enslaved subordinate, noting that she begins the story wearing a shock collar that the player may either remove or use to punish her. After deliberately playing through the abusive route on a second Sith Warrior character, Fahey wrote that he found no "perverse pleasure" in developing an abusive relationship between his character and Vette and described it as one of the few video game experiences that had made him feel "dirty and evil". Forbes contributor Erik Kain also discussed Vette in the context of sexism in The Old Republic, focusing on her status as the Sith Warrior's enslaved companion and the game's shock-collar mechanic.

Writing for The Mary Sue, Becky Chambers argued that Vette's character concept could be defensible in theory because Sith characters are expected to be violent and cruel, and because slavery and torture were already part of the wider Star Wars setting. However, Chambers argued that Vette's gender and presentation could not be separated from real-world context, particularly because some players discussed the character's mistreatment in ways that resembled misogynistic language rather than in-character role-playing. Chambers concluded that BioWare's handling of the mechanic was shortsighted because the game rewarded players for torturing Vette and should have anticipated the kind of community response the scenario could invite. In response to Chambers' article, Kain returned to the subject in a broader essay on women players and sexism in gaming culture, referring back to the ability in The Old Republic to torture Vette by shocking her with the collar.

==== Daily Mail coverage and responses ====
The controversy was later picked up by the Daily Mail through an article by Rob Waugh with the headline "Hit Star Wars game lets players 'own' and torment female slaves with electric shock collar". Waugh drew heavily on Fahey's article for Kotaku and alleged that although Sith Warrior players could treat Vette kindly, the decent treatment option did not appear to be popular among players. He also argued that the idea of playing "master" was unsavoury, despite acknowledging that slavery had appeared elsewhere in Star Wars.

MCV/Develop and Destructoid criticised the Daily Mail article as sensationalist and argued that it failed to provide evidence for its claims about player behaviour, with Destructoid noting that the article largely relied on Fahey's sarcastic Kotaku post. Andy Robinson of Computer and Video Games similarly criticised the Daily Mail for omitting that female player characters could also shock Vette, and accused the newspaper of hypocrisy because of the paper's own sexually oriented articles. Austrian outlet Krone.at also reported on the controversy, describing Vette as a Twi'lek slave companion for Sith Warrior players and summarising criticism that the game allowed players to shock, strike and otherwise mistreat her; its report framed the alleged player behaviour as a competition over who could treat the character worse.

=== Analysis ===
In a 2015 article for Religion Dispatches, Robert M. Geraci and Nat Recine discussed the Vette controversy as part of a wider study of morality and role-playing in The Old Republic. The authors said the earlier Daily Mail controversy and the responses to it had not addressed what players actually did in the game, so they surveyed 369 The Old Republic players about evil choices, moral interpretation, and whether in-game behaviour affected their everyday views. They found that although torturing Vette was narratively consistent with playing an evil Sith Warrior, most respondents resisted that behaviour: 84% of players who encountered Vette chose to befriend her instead, and the average rating for the moral acceptability of torturing her was 2.4 out of 5. Geraci and Recine argued that companion characters such as Vette affected players' moral decision-making because they accompanied the player, reacted to choices, and gained or lost affection based on the player's conduct. They cited player responses indicating that attachment to Vette could lead players away from dark-side choices, and concluded that the survey undermined claims that The Old Republic encouraged real-world cruelty. Instead, they argued that the game could prompt players to reflect on moral behaviour while role-playing darker choices.

In the edited volume Digital Love: Romance and Sexuality in Games, Jessica Sliwinski discussed two story scenarios involving Vette in a chapter on casual romance in The Old Republic. Sliwinski analysed the Lady Grathan encounter as an unusually extreme example of the Sith Warrior storyline's darker use of casual sex and power-fantasy material., and of casual romance being shaped by Sith power relations. She noted that while Lady Grathan has agency to actively proposition the player character and appears to understand Sith violence and sexual bargaining, Vette's position is different because she lacks agency as a slave and can be compelled to remain present despite her discomfort. If the player refuses to let Vette leave, Sliwinski suggested that the scene uses Vette's lack of freedom to underline the darker implications of the Sith Warrior's sexual and social power. Sliwinski also connected this to a later scene involving Vette's sister Tivva, in which the player may exploit Tivva's situation by demanding sex before helping Vette to buy her sister's freedom, describing it as one of the most severe examples of player cruelty in the Sith Warrior storyline.
