= A Pig's Tail =

- Directed by: Sarah Cox
- Written by: Matthew Walker
- Produced by: Jason Bartholemew; Gutleben Christine; Heather Wright
- Starring: Heidi Lynch; Kaia Rose; Sophie Angelson; Catherine Taber; James Arnold Taylor
- Cinematography: Nathan Sale Sr.
- Edited by: Victoria Stevens; Jonny Crew
- Music by: Steven Delopoulos
- Production company: Aardman Animations
- Release date: 24 October 2012 (United States)
- Running time: 5 minutes
- Countries: United Kingdom; United States
- Language: English

A Pig's Tail is a 2012 British-American 5-minute stop motion animated short film directed by Sarah Cox, written by Matthew Walker, produced by Jason Bartholemew, Gutleben Christine and Heather Wright and created by Aardman Animations for The Humane Society of the United States.

== Plot ==
Ginger imagines a future for her family that is much nicer than the dark and smelly intensive pig farm where they all live.

== Cast ==
- Catherine Taber as Ginger
- Sophie Angelson as Mama Pig
- Heidi Lynch as Mean Piglet
- James Arnold Taylor as The Farmer
- Kaia Rose as Nice Piglet
