= Faye Marsay =

English actress (born 1986)

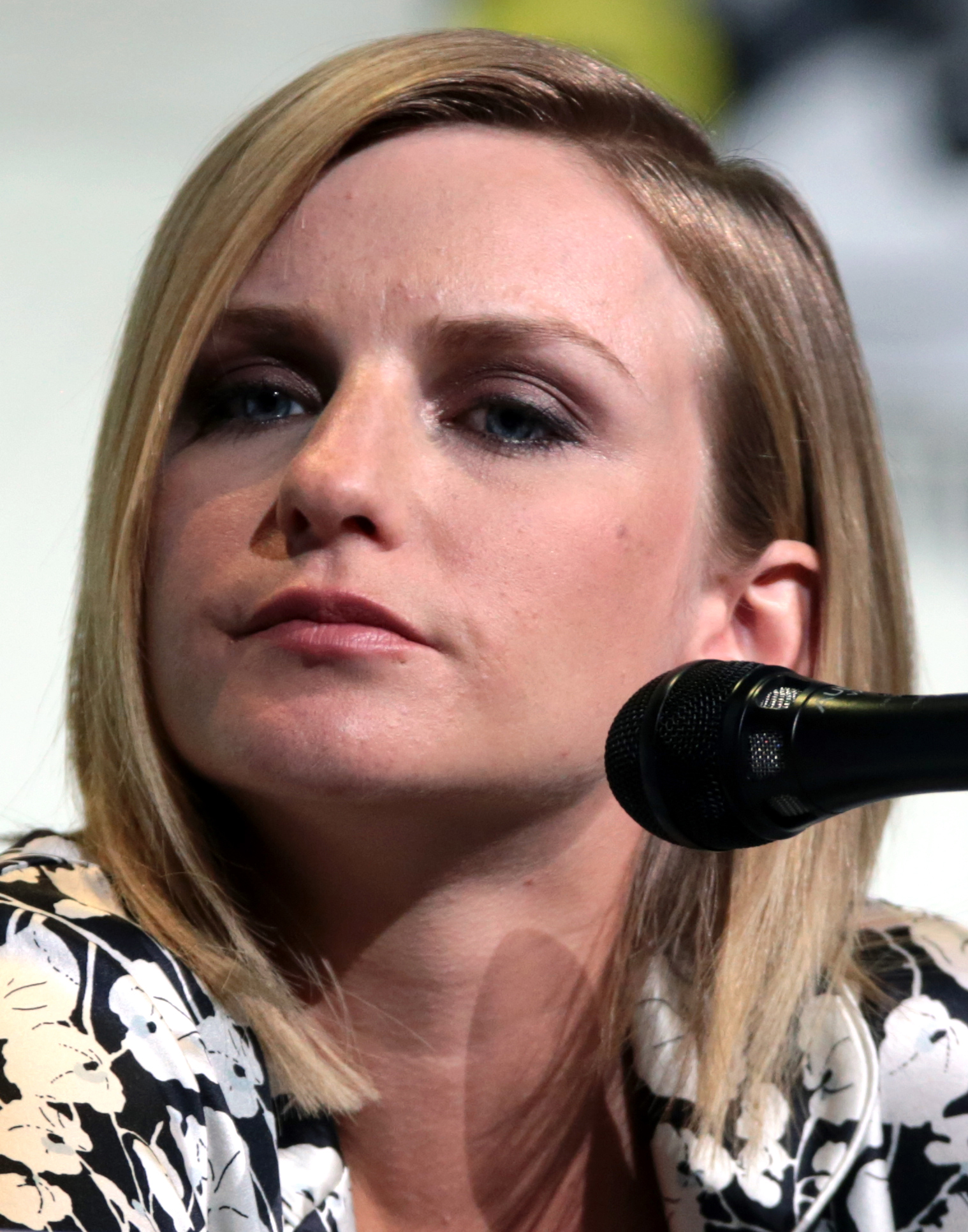
- Marsay at the 2016 San Diego Comic-Con
- Born: Faye Elaine Marsay; 30 December 1986 (age 39); Middlesbrough, North Yorkshire, England
- Education: Bristol Old Vic Theatre School
- Occupation: Actress
- Years active: 2008–present
- Spouse: Heidi Lynch

Faye Elaine Marsay (born 30 December 1986) is an English actress. Her roles include Anne Neville in The White Queen (2013), the recurring character Candice in Fresh Meat (2013), Steph in the film Pride (2014), Amy in Need for Speed (2015), The Waif in the fifth and sixth seasons of Game of Thrones (2015–2016), Blue Colson in the Black Mirror episode "Hated in the Nation" (2016), Vel Sartha in Star Wars: Andor (2022–2025), and DS Misha Frank in Adolescence (2025).

== Early life ==
Marsay was born in Middlesbrough. She moved to Loftus, where she attended the Laurence Jackson School in Guisborough. Marsay went on to Prior Pursglove College, before joining the Bristol Old Vic Theatre School, where she played the roles of Sissy Jupe in Hard Times, First Wyrd Sister and Fleance in Macbeth, Runt in Disco Pigs, and Shen Te in The Good Soul of Szechuan. It was during her time at the Old Vic school that she won the Spotlight Prize of 2012. As soon as she graduated, she landed a main role in The White Queen.

== Career ==
In 2013, Marsay landed her first professional role, playing Anne Neville in The White Queen. Next, Marsay played new "fresher" Candice Pelling in the TV series Fresh Meat.

In 2014, Marsay played the role of Lizzie Lancaster in series two of The Bletchley Circle. In September, she had two projects debut, the first being BAFTA nominated film Pride, in which she played the character of Steph. The second was the TV miniseries murder mystery Glue. Marsay played the character Janine Riley. Marsay also appeared in the 2014 Doctor Who Christmas special "Last Christmas" as Shona McCullough. The character of Shona was intended by showrunner Steven Moffat to become a new, permanent companion, replacing Jenna Coleman who had decided to leave the production. Coleman changed her mind during filming and an additional final scene was added at the last minute, reversing her exit, and leaving Shona to her current life.

2015 began with Marsay appearing in the fifth season of Game of Thrones as the Waif. In June, Marsay was cast as new character Katie Springer in My Mad Fat Diary for the final series. At the beginning of October, Marsay was named one of Screen International's 2015 Stars of Tomorrow.

In October 2015, a radio drama debuted on BBC Radio 4 called The Price of Oil. The episode "No Two Days" starred Marsay as Izzie. In November, Marsay appeared as Amy in the video game Need for Speed, adopting an American accent. Next, the short film NippleJesus, based on the short story by Nick Hornby, debuted at the Austin Film Festival and premiered in London.

2016 brought Marsay the role of Christine in the sixth series of ITV's Vera. She then continued her role as the Waif in Game of Thrones later that month. In May and June 2016, Marsay played the leading role of Nina Stibbe in the BBC's Love, Nina. Later that year, she appeared in "Hated in the Nation", an episode of the anthology series Black Mirror as Blue Colson alongside Kelly Macdonald.

In 2017 Marsay costarred in Daisy Aitkens's debut feature You, Me and Him with Lucy Punch and David Tennant, and appeared in the film Darkest Hour, starring Gary Oldman. She also appeared in a revival of Jim Cartwright's play Road at the Royal Court Theatre In December 2017, Marsay starred in ITV drama Bancroft alongside Sarah Parish. In 2017, she also appeared in Channel 4 drama Shamed.

In 2018, Marsay appeared in the BBC/AMC's McMafia, with James Norton. In November, Marsay appeared in A Private War alongside Rosamund Pike, Stanley Tucci and Jamie Dornan.

In 2019, Marsay played the role of DC Joanne Aspinall in the ITV six-part drama Deep Water, starring Anna Friel, Rosalind Eleazar, and Sinead Keenan. In 2020 she narrated two episodes of the E4 series The Sex Clinic.

In 2022, she premiered in the new Star Wars television series Andor, a prequel to the film Rogue One, as Vel Sartha. Later, she portrayed Hilda Reid in Laure de Clermont-Tonnerre's adaptation of Lady Chatterley's Lover, starring Emma Corrin and Jack O'Connell.

2023 saw Marsay star next to Warren Brown and Michelle Keegan as Annie Roberts in Ten Pound Poms about a group of Britons who leave their home for Australia in search of a better life.

In 2025 Marsay appeared in the second season of Ten Pound Poms and Adolescence, starring Stephan Graham, Ashley Walters, Erin Doherty, and Owen Cooper. In April, she continued in the role of Vel Sartha in the final season of Andor.

In 2026 she appeared as Lizzie Davies, captain for the women's team, in the fourth season of Ted Lasso.

== Personal life ==
Marsay is a football fan, watching Premier League matches and supporting Middlesbrough Football Club. She is married to Canadian actress Heidi Lynch.

== Filmography ==
Key
†	Denotes works that have not yet been released

=== Film ===
Year	Title	Role	Notes
2008	Helen	Background performer	
2008	Is That It?	Sue	
2014	Pride	Steph Chambers	
2015	NippleJesus	Siobhán	Short film
2017	Darkest Hour	Sybil	
2017	You, Me and Him	Alex Jones	
2018	A Private War	Kate Richardson	
2019	Seconds Out	Stella	Short film
2022	Lady Chatterley's Lover	Hilda Reid	

=== Television ===
Year	Title	Role	Notes
2013	The White Queen	Anne Neville	Episodes 1–10
2013	Fresh Meat	Candice Pelling	Series 3; episodes 1–8
2014	The Bletchley Circle	Lizzie Lancaster	Series 2; episodes 1–4
2014	Glue	Janine Riley	Mini-series; episodes 1–8
2014	Doctor Who	Shona McCullough	Series 9; episode: "Last Christmas"
2015	My Mad Fat Diary	Katie Springer	Series 3; episodes 1–3
2015–2016	Game of Thrones	The Waif	Seasons 5 & 6; 11 episodes
2016	Vera	Christine	Series 6; episode 1: "Dark Road"
2016	Love, Nina	Nina Stibbe	Mini-series; episodes 1–5
2016	Black Mirror	Blue Colson	Series 3; episode 6: "Hated in the Nation"
2017	Bancroft	DS Katherine Stevens	Series 1; episodes 1–4
2017	Shamed	Sarah Ivy	Television film
2018	McMafia	Katya Godman	8 episodes
2019	Deep Water	Joanne Aspinall	Mini-series; episodes 1–6
2019–2020	The Sex Clinic	Herself - Narrator	Series 1 & 2; 14 episodes
2020	Avocado Toast	The One	Series 1; episodes 1–6 & 10
2022–2025	Andor	Vel Sartha	15 episodes
2023–2025	Ten Pound Poms	Annie Roberts	Series 1 & 2; 12 episodes
2025	Adolescence	DS Misha Frank	Mini-series; episodes 1 & 2
2025	Get Hooked	Self	Doc series; 6 episodes
2026	Ted Lasso	Lizzie Davis	Season 4

=== Stage ===
Year	Title	Role	Company
2008	Hansel and Gretel	Woodfolk	Northern Stage
2009	Peter Pan	Tinker Bell / Tiger Lily	Northern Stage
2009	Five Kinds of Silence	Susan	Live Across Newcastle
2010	The Journey (UK Regional Tour)	Owen	Taproot Theatre Company
2011	The Cherry Orchard	Dunyasha	BOVTS
2011	Canopy of Stars	Cheryl	BOVTS
2011	All's Well That Ends Well	Diana	BOVTS
2011	Hard Times	Sissy Jupe	BOVTS
2012	Macbeth	First Wyrd Sister / Fleance	BOVTS
2012	Disco Pigs	Runt	BOVTS
2012	The Good Soul of Szechuan	Shen Te	BOVTS
2017	Road	Louise / Clare	Royal Court
2019	Europe	Adele	Donmar Warehouse

=== Radio ===
Year	Title	Role	Notes	Station
2015	The Price of Oil	Izzie	Episode: "No Two Days"	BBC Radio 4 Drama
2019	Hello Stranger	Beth	Short story	BBC Radio 4 Short Works
2021	Tess of the D'Urbervilles	Tess	3 episodes	BBC Radio 4 Drama
2022	In Diamond Square	Julieta	Audio Drama	BBC Radio 4 Drama

=== Video games ===
Year	Title	Role	Notes
2015	Need for Speed	Amy	Voice and live-action cutscenes

== Awards and nominations ==
Year	Organization	Award	Result
2012	Spotlight	Spotlight Prize	Won
2015	Screen International	Stars of Tomorrow	Achievement
2016	Screen Actors Guild Award	Outstanding Performance by an Ensemble in a Drama Series (For Game of Thrones)	Nominated
2018	Lady Filmmakers Film Festival	Best Supporting Actress Feature (You, Me and Him)	Won
