= Dan Milano =

American voice actor, puppeteer, animator, writer, director

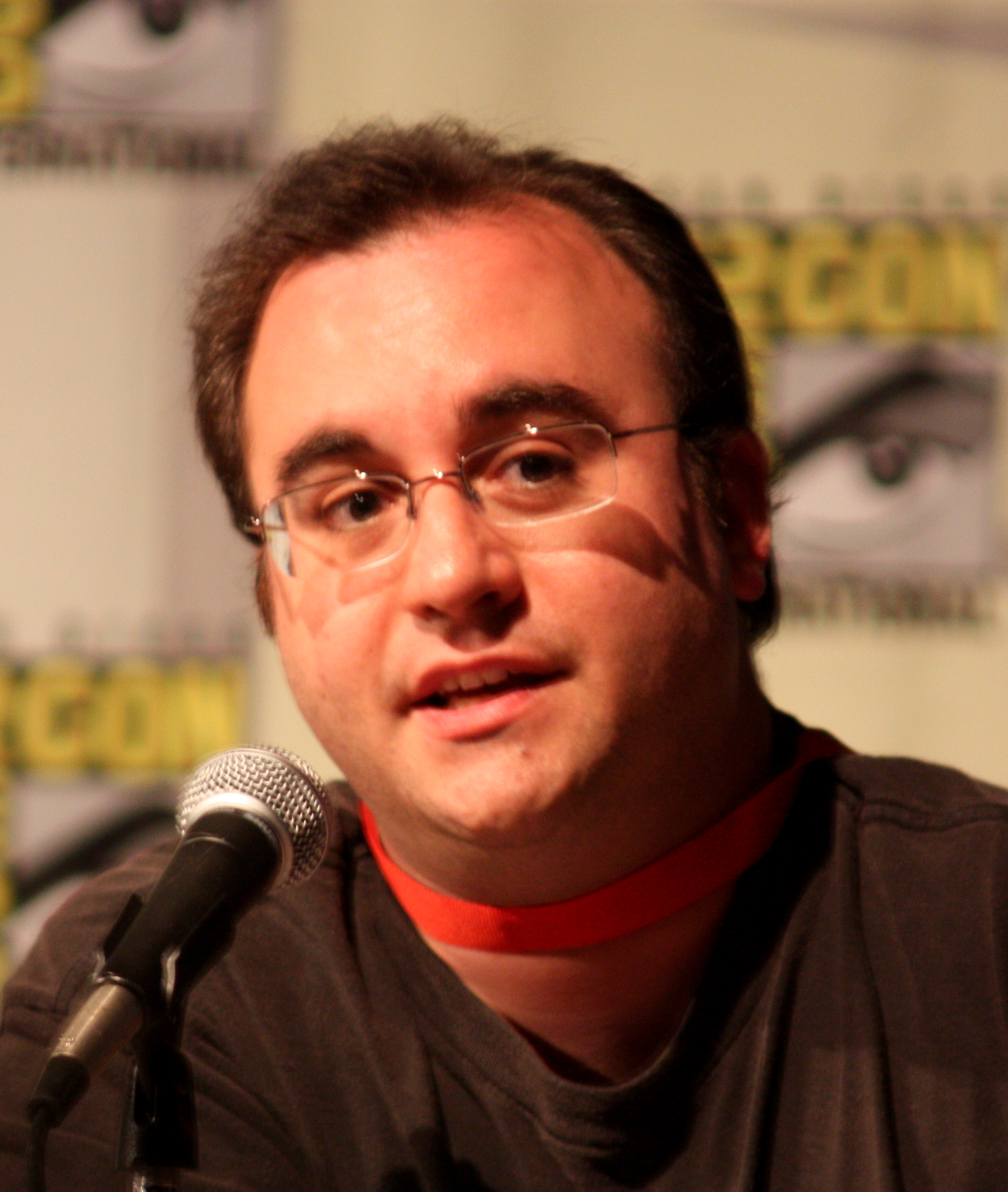
- Milano at the 2009 San Diego Comic-Con
- Occupations: Voice actor; puppeteer; animator; writer; director
- Years active: 2002–present
- Known for: Greg the Bunny; Robot Chicken; Glitch Techs
- Spouse: Christa Starr
- Children: 1

Dan Milano is an American voice actor, puppeteer, animator, writer and director. He was one of the creators of the Fox sitcom Greg the Bunny and performed the title character Greg. He is also one of the voice actors and writers of Robot Chicken, and was nominated for an Emmy for writing on Robot Chicken: Star Wars 2.

Dan Milano with Warren the Ape (2010)

Milano also starred in Adult Swim's television series, Titan Maximum. He has also co-written and co-produced the MTV's series Warren the Ape, where he again played the title character Warren. In 2013, Milano began work at DreamWorks Television as part of their content development deal with Netflix.

== Career ==
Milano attended New York University's Tisch School of the Arts and SUNY Buffalo's summer arts program. While at NYU, Milano wrote for the student-run comedy magazine, The Plague. His first industry job was co-creating a series of shorts for the Independent Film Channel based on Greg the Bunny, a puppet character Milano also performs.

Based on the main character from their public access series called Junktape, Milano and friends took Greg The Bunny to 20th Century Fox as a 13-episode primetime series, produced by Neil Moritz and run by Steve Levitan. Milano exec-produced, wrote and performed on the series as characters Greg the Bunny and Warren the Ape, alongside co-stars Sarah Silverman, Seth Green, and Eugene Levy.

The relationship with Seth Green led to Milano's involvement as a writer and voice actor on Robot Chicken, Titan Maximum and Star Wars: Detours. Meanwhile, Milano and then-writing partner sold a spec feature to Laura Ziskin and Sony Pictures, called Me & My Monster. Developed with effects wizard Stan Winston, the movie was in development with such directors as Neil Jordan, McG, and Jon Favreau (the latter having also appeared on an IFC Greg the Bunny Reunion Special).

After the Fox series was canceled, Greg returned to IFC and eventually the spin-off series, Warren the Ape was created for MTV Networks. This 12-episode "reality show" about Warren's fallout in the post-Fox years co-starred Josh Sussman and Dr. Drew Pinsky.

Milano's film career had him working with his partner on development assignments for The Jim Henson Company, Flower Films, The Donner's Company and more. Milano's solo credit on Short Circuit was written for the producer of the original film David Foster and Dimension's Bob Weinstein.

Milano has sold pilots including The Spaces, Dad Monster Hunter (also known as Shadowchasers), and worked on shows such as Crash & Bernstein (Director), and Star Wars: Detours (Writer/Actor).

In 2014, Milano and Eric Robles created Glitch Techs, an anime-inspired adventure comedy about a team of consumer electronic technicians that wrangle creatures and other phenomena caused by faulty video game technology. Twenty episodes have been fully produced by Nickelodeon Animation Studio, with an additional ten scripts/storyboards that were developed in 2018. Originally slated for a 2019 release on Nickelodeon, the series premiered on Netflix on February 21, 2020, with the first nine episodes.

Milano was never trained in puppetry but was obsessed with the art form as a child and built a talent for it. He has focused primarily on writing, developing for features and television but does occasionally work as a voice actor.

== Filmography ==
=== Television ===
List of television productions by Dan Milano
Year	Title	Role	Notes
2002–2006	Greg the Bunny	Co-creator, voice actor, narrator, puppeteer	
2005–present	Robot Chicken	Voice actor, writer	
2009	Titan Maximum	Voice actor	
2010	Warren the Ape	Co-creator, voice actor	spinoff of Greg the Bunny
2013	Star Wars Detours	Voice actor, writer	Cancelled
2015–2017	Dawn of the Croods	Voice actor, writer	
2020	Glitch Techs	Co-creator, voice actor	
2020	The George Lucas Talk Show	Self	Episode: "Revenge of Return of the Jedi", with Eric Robles

=== Video games ===
List of voice performances in video games
Year	Title	Role	Notes
2006	Dirge of Cerberus: Final Fantasy VII	Incidental characters	
