= Mary-Kay Wilmers =

American editor (born 1938)

Mary-Kay Wilmers Hon.FRSL Hon.FBA
- Born: 19 July 1938 (age 88); Chicago, Illinois, U.S.
- Education: St Hugh's College, Oxford University
- Occupations: Journalist and editor
- Known for: Editor of the London Review of Books (1992–2021)
- Spouse: Stephen Frears (1968–early 1970s)
- Children: 2
- Relatives: Robert G. Wilmers (brother)

Mary-Kay Wilmers, Hon. FRSL Hon. FBA (born 19 July 1938) is an American editor and journalist. She was the editor of the London Review of Books from 1992 to 2021, and she remains consulting editor. She is a recipient of the Benson Medal from the Royal Society of Literature.

== Family and education ==
Mary-Kay Wilmers was born in Chicago, Illinois, and grew up in New York City. She lived in the United States for the first eight years of her childhood, by the end of which she had lived in 10 different homes and attended eight different schools in America and Europe. Her mother, Cecilia Eitington, was of Russian-Jewish descent, and her father's family were, she said, "very English", but they had come from Germany. For many years Wilmers worked on a book, published in 2009 as The Eitingons: A Twentieth Century Story, recounting the story of her mother's Russian relations, including the psychoanalyst Max Eitingon, as well as her grandfather's cousin Leonid Eitingon, an agent in Joseph Stalin's NKVD who was responsible for masterminding the assassination of Leon Trotsky.

In 1946 Wilmers' parents moved to Europe, spending time in London, Portugal, Belgium, and Switzerland. Her father Charles Wilmers was President of Sofina, a Belgian multinational utilities holding company. Wilmers was educated in Brussels and at boarding school in England. She said that for some time she was happier speaking French than English. Her brother Robert G. Wilmers was an American billionaire and chairman of M&T Bank until his death in 2017.

At Oxford University, where Wilmers studied modern languages at St Hugh's College from 1957, she befriended Alan Bennett, later a regular contributor to the London Review of Books. Bennett said about Wilmers's time at university: "Outside the novels of Nancy Mitford or Evelyn Waugh, I had never come across anyone who behaved so confidently or in such a cosmopolitan fashion." For the week of her finals she moved into the Randolph Hotel, staying with her father whose presence was required due to her threat to not sit the exams.

== Career ==
=== Early career ===
After her graduation in 1960, she thought about becoming a translator at the United Nations, but instead went to work at the publishers Faber and Faber, employed at first as a secretary. On one occasion she thought she might be sacked for saying "bugger" in front of T. S. Eliot, whose letters she used to type. She later became an editor at Faber and Faber, where she commissioned many books, among them Patriarchal Attitudes by Eva Figes, one of the first works of British feminism. She left Faber aged 29 to become deputy editor of The Listener, edited by Karl Miller, and in the 1970s had a spell at The Times Literary Supplement (TLS).

=== London Review of Books ===
In 1979, Wilmers joined Miller in founding the London Review of Books (LRB), conceived to fill a gap in the market as a year-long industrial dispute had closed The Times Literary Supplement. The new review was an offshoot of The New York Review of Books, at first appearing folded inside the older publication. The first edition appeared in October 1979.

The New York Review of Books withdrew its support after a few months, and in May 1980, Wilmers made the first of a number of investments of money inherited from her father, establishing an independent London Review of Books and later making herself the majority shareholder. In January 2010, The Times reported that the review was £27 million in debt to the Wilmers family trust. "It's family money and the debts have been rising for many years," Wilmers said. "But I really just look after the commas."

Wilmers became co-editor in 1988 and editor in 1992. Her style was to take a highly interventionist approach: "You want to help readers along. Not discourage them by making them go through a swamp of unnecessary sentences", she said. Her friend Hilary Mantel called Wilmers "a presiding genius", and Andrew O'Hagan explained: "She can’t bear a lazy sentence or secondhand metaphor. She’s tireless in her commitment to the paper". In 2009 the London Review's circulation was 48,000, making it the largest-selling literary publication in Europe. Wilmers stepped down as editor after almost 30 years in 2021, remaining at the magazine as consulting editor.

As an editor, Wilmers has been closely associated with the work of a number of novelists and essayists, including Alan Bennett, John Lanchester, Jenny Diski, Blake Morrison, Alan Hollinghurst, Seamus Heaney, Ian McEwan, Salman Rushdie, Julian Barnes, Craig Raine, Colm Tóibín, Stefan Collini, James Wood, Linda Colley, Jacqueline Rose, Paul Foot, Tariq Ali and Edward Luttwak. Many of these were published prominently when at the beginnings of their careers.

Politically, the review is not known for following a consistent party political line, although Wilmers described herself as being "captivated by the left but not of it". Under her editorship the review's treatment of political matters sometimes attracted controversy. In 2006, an article by academics John Mearsheimer and Stephen Walt was criticised in some quarters for its claim that the foreign policy of the United States was in the grip of an "Israel lobby". Wilmers has herself said, "I'm unambiguously hostile to Israel because it's a mendacious state", an assessment that has not gone unchallenged. An article by the Cambridge historian Mary Beard, published after the events of September 11, 2001, attracted some attention for suggesting that "America had it coming", and when David Marquand, the political historian and principal of Mansfield College, Oxford, submitted a review praising Tony Blair's handling of the post-11 September period as "impeccable", Wilmers replied saying, "I can't square it with my conscience to praise so wholeheartedly Blair's conduct," and pulled the piece. Marquand announced that he was "utterly shocked".

Wilmers "officially relinquished her role as a director" of the LRB in 2026.

== Honours ==
A book of tributes to Wilmers, Bad Character, was published privately in June 2008 and distributed as a limited edition.

Wilmers is an Honorary Fellow of St Hugh's College, Oxford. In 2017, she was elected an Honorary Fellow of the Royal Society of Literature, as well as being honoured with their Benson Medal. In 2018, she was elected an Honorary Fellow of the British Academy.

== Personal life ==
In 1968, Wilmers married film director Stephen Frears, with whom she had two sons, Sam and Will. They lived on Gloucester Crescent in Camden Town, London. Frears left Wilmers while she was pregnant with their second son Will in the early 1970s, and the couple divorced. Nina Stibbe, the live-in nanny whom Wilmers hired in the early 1980s, wrote letters home that described the North London "literati" life; these were compiled, published, and adapted into the 2016 TV series Love, Nina.
