= Black Reel Award for Outstanding Breakthrough Performance, Female =

Award presented annually by the Black Reel Awards

- Awarded for: Outstanding Breakthrough Performance, Female
- Country: United States
- Presented by: Black Reel Awards (BRAs)
- First award: Black Reel Awards of 2014
- Most recent winner: Ariana DeBose; West Side Story (Black Reel Awards of 2022)
- Website: blackreelawards.com

This article lists the winners and nominees for the Black Reel Award for Outstanding Breakthrough Performance, Female. Prior to 2014 the category was no gender specific, thus was called Outstanding Breakthrough Performance. Naomie Harris was the first woman to win the Outstanding Breakthrough Performance category. Sharon Warren was the first actress to win a Black Reel Awards in a Lead or Supporting performance and the Breakthrough performance in the same year.

Currently, Lupita Nyong'o is the first person (man or woman) to win the BRA "Triple Crown" acting award with wins in the Lead, Supporting and Breakthrough categories. Nyong'o took home the award for Outstanding Supporting Actress & Outstanding Breakthrough Performance, Male for 12 Years a Slave and won the award for Outstanding Actress for Us.

At age 9, Quvenzhané Wallis became the youngest actress to win this award for Beasts of the Southern Wild and at age 38, Tiffany Haddish became the oldest winner in this category for Girls Trip. At the 15th Annual Black Reel Awards both Mya Taylor and Kitana Kiki Rodriguez became the first transgender actresses nominated in this category for their performances in Tangerine.

== Winners and nominees ==
Winners are listed first and highlighted in bold.

=== 2010s ===
Year	Actress	Film	Ref
Outstanding Breakthrough Performance, Female
2014
2014	**Lupita Nyong'o**	**12 Years a Slave** **(Outstanding Supporting Actress Winner)**	
2014	Melonie Diaz	Fruitvale Station (Outstanding Supporting Actress nominee)	
2014	Danai Gurira	Mother of George **(Outstanding Actress Winner)**	
2014	Lindiwe Matshikiza	Mandela: Long Walk to Freedom	
2014	Tashiana Washington	Gimme the Loot	
2015
2015	**Teyonah Parris**	**Dear White People** (Outstanding Supporting Actress nominee)	
2015	Jillian Estell	Black or White	
2015	Patina Miller	The Hunger Games: Mockingjay – Part 1	
2015	Amber Stevens	22 Jump Street	
2015	Kuoth Wiel	The Good Lie	
2016
2016	**Kiersey Clemons**	**Dope**	
2016	Chanel Iman	Dope	
2016	Kitana Kiki Rodriguez	Tangerine (Outstanding Actress nominee)	
2016	Assa Sylla	Girlhood	
2016	Mya Taylor	Tangerine (Outstanding Supporting Actress nominee)	
2017
2017	**Janelle Monae**	**Hidden Figures** (Outstanding Supporting Actress nominee)	
2017	Royalty Hightower	The Fits (Outstanding Actress nominee)	
2017	Sasha Lane	American Honey (Outstanding Actress nominee)	
2017	Leslie Jones	Ghostbusters	
2017	Aja Naomi King	The Birth of a Nation	
2018
2018	**Tiffany Haddish**	**Girls Trip** **(Outstanding Supporting Actress Winner)**	
2018	Betty Gabriel	Get Out (Outstanding Supporting Actress nominee)	
2018	Mary J. Blige	Mudbound (Outstanding Supporting Actress nominee)	
2018	Natalie Paul	Crown Heights **(Outstanding Actress Winner)**	
2018	Jessica Williams	The Incredible Jessica James (Outstanding Actress nominee)	
2019
2019	**Letitia Wright**	**Black Panther** (Outstanding Supporting Actress nominee)	
2019	Laura Harrier	BlacKkKlansman	
2019	Zoe Renee	Jinn (Outstanding Actress nominee)	
2019	KiKi Layne	If Beale Street Could Talk **(Outstanding Actress Winner)**	
2019	Cynthia Erivo	Bad Times at the El Royale	

=== 2020s ===
Year	Actress	Film	Ref
2020
2020	**Da’Vine Joy Randolph**	**Dolemite Is My Name** **(Outstanding Supporting Actress Winner)**	
2020	Shahadi Wright Joseph	Us (Outstanding Supporting Actress nominee)	
2020	Jodie Turner-Smith	Queen & Slim (Outstanding Actress nominee)	
2020	Taylor Russell	Waves (Outstanding Supporting Actress nominee)	
2020	Mame Bineta Sane	Atlantics	
2021
2021	**Andra Day**	**The United States vs. Billie Holiday** (Outstanding Actress nominee)	
2021	Radha Blank	The Forty-Year-Old Version	
2021	Alexis Chikaeze	Miss Juneteenth (Outstanding Supporting Actress nominee)	
2021	Dominique Fishback	Judas and the Black Messiah **(Outstanding Supporting Actress Winner)**	
2021	Zendaya	Malcolm & Marie (Outstanding Actress nominee)	
2022
2022	**Ariana DeBose**	**West Side Story** (Outstanding Supporting Actress nominee)	
2022	Danielle Deadwyler	The Harder They Fall	
2022	Taylour Paige	Zola (Outstanding Actress nominee)	
2022	Saniyya Sidney	King Richard	
2022	Demi Singleton	King Richard	
2023
2023	**Thuso Mbedu**	**The Woman King**	
2023	Sheila Atim	The Woman King	
2023	Charmaine Bingwa	Emancipation	
2023	Anna Diop	Nanny	
2023	Dominique Thorne	Black Panther: Wakanda Forever	

== Multiple nominations from the same film ==
- Kiersey Clemons (winner) and Chanel Iman in Dope (2016)
- Kitana Kiki Rodriguez and Mya Taylor in Tangerine (2016)
- Saniyya Sidney and Demi Singleton in King Richard (2022)
- Thuso Mbedu (winner) and Sheila Atim in The Woman King(2023)

== Age superlatives ==
Record	Actress	Film	Age (in years)
Oldest winner	Tiffany Haddish	Girls Trip	38
Oldest nominee	Kim Wayans	Pariah	50
Youngest winner	Quvenzhané Wallis	Beasts of the Southern Wild	9
Youngest nominee	Quvenzhané Wallis	Beasts of the Southern Wild	9
