= 16th Annual Black Reel Awards =

Film-industry awards in 2016

16th Black Reel Awards
- Date: February 18, 2016
- Location: Washington, D.C.

The 2016 Black Reel Awards, which annually recognize and celebrate the achievements of black people in feature, independent and television films, were announced on Thursday, February 18, 2016. Creed and Straight Outta Compton led all films with nine nominations apiece.

Creed was the big winner of the night winning five awards including Outstanding Picture, Director (Ryan Coogler) and Actor (Michael B. Jordan). Bessie took home three awards followed by American Crime, Beasts of No Nation and Straight Outta Compton with two wins.

Dee Rees, Ryan Coogler, Regina King, Rihanna, Michael B. Jordan, Abraham Attah and Kiersey Clemons were some of the winners earning their first Black Reel Award.

== Winners and nominees ==
Winners are listed first and highlighted in bold.

Best Film	Best Director
**Creed**; Beasts of No Nation; Chi-Raq; Concussion; Straight Outta Compton	**Ryan Coogler – Creed**; Rick Famuyiwa – Dope; Antoine Fuqua – Southpaw; F. Gary Gray – Straight Outta Compton; Spike Lee – Chi-Raq
Best Actor	Best Actress
**Michael B. Jordan – Creed**; Abraham Attah – Beasts of No Nation; Chiwetel Ejiofor – Z for Zachariah; Samuel L. Jackson – The Hateful Eight; Will Smith – Concussion	**Teyonah Parris – Chi-Raq**; Viola Davis – Lila & Eve; Kitana Kiki Rodriguez – Tangerine; Zoe Saldaña – Infinitely Polar Bear; Karidja Toure – Girlhood
Best Supporting Actor	Best Supporting Actress
**Idris Elba – Beasts of No Nation**; Chiwetel Ejiofor – The Martian; Corey Hawkins – Straight Outta Compton; Jason Mitchell – Straight Outta Compton; Forest Whitaker – Southpaw	**Tessa Thompson – Creed**; Angela Bassett – Chi-Raq; Zoë Kravitz – Dope; Gugu Mbatha-Raw – Concussion; Mya Taylor – Tangerine
Best Breakthrough Performance, Male	Best Breakthrough Performance, Female
**Abraham Attah – Beasts of No Nation**; RJ Cyler – Me and Earl and the Dying Girl; O'Shea Jackson Jr. – Straight Outta Compton; Jason Mitchell – Straight Outta Compton; Shameik Moore – Dope	**Kiersey Clemons – Dope**; Chanel Iman – Dope; Kitana Kiki Rodriguez – Tangerine; Assa Sylla – Girlhood; Mya Taylor – Tangerine
Best Ensemble	Best Screenplay, Adapted or Original
**Victoria Thomas and Cindy Tolan – Straight Outta Compton**; Kim Coleman – Chi-Raq; Kim Coleman – Dope; Lindsay Graham and Mary Vernieu – Concussion; Francine Maisler – Creed	**Ryan Coogler and Aaron Covington – Creed**; Rick Famuyiwa – Dope; Spike Lee and Kevin Willmott – Chi-Raq
Best Feature Documentary	Best Voice Performance
**What Happened, Miss Simone? – Liz Garbus**; A Ballerina's Tale – Nelson George; The Amazing Nina Simone – Jeff L. Lieberman; The Black Panthers: Vanguard of the Revolution – Stanley Nelson Jr.; Sweet Micky for President – Ben Patterson	**Rihanna – Home**; Maya Rudolph – Strange Magic; Marelik Walker – The Peanuts Movie; Quvenzhané Wallis – The Prophet; Jeffrey Wright – The Good Dinosaur
Best Independent Feature	Best Independent Documentary
**Tangerine – Sean S. Baker**; Blackbird – Patrik-Ian Polk; Knucklehead – Ben Bowman; The Man in 3B – Trey Haley; Somewhere in the Middle – Lanre Olabisi	**Mary Lou Williams: The Lady Who Swings the Band – Carol Bush**; Adina Howard 20: A Story of Sexual Liberation – Gezus Zaire; Be Known – Dwayne Johnson-Cochran; Cody High: A Life Remodeled Project – Walter V. Marshall; Romeo is Bleeding – Jason Zeldes
Best Independent Short	Best Foreign Film
**Addiction – Danny Dzhurayev**; David's Reviere – Neil Creque Williams; Sacred Heart – Sol Aponte and Jennia Fredrique	**Girlhood (France) – Céline Sciamma**; Freetown (Liberia) – Garrett Batty; Honeytrap (U.K.) – Jonas Carpignano; Mediterranea (Italy) – Jonas Carpignano; My Friend Victoria (France) – Jean-Paul Civeyrac; Samba (France) – Éric Toledano and Olivier Nakache
Best Original or Adapted Song	Outstanding Original Score
**"See You Again" from Furious 7 – Wiz Khalifa and Charlie Puth**; "Earned It" from Fifty Shades of Grey – The Weeknd; "Grip" from Creed – Tessa Thompson; "Talking to My Diary" from Straight Outta Compton – Dr. Dre; "Waiting for My Moment" from Creed – Childish Gambino, Vince Staples and Jhené Aiko	**Joseph Trapanese – Straight Outta Compton**; Terence Blanchard – Chi-Raq; Germaine Franco – Dope; Ludwig Göransson – Creed; Dan Romer – Beasts of No Nation
Best Television Miniseries or Movie	Outstanding Director in a Television Miniseries or Movie
**Bessie (HBO) – Ron Schmidt**; American Crime (ABC) – Ed Tapla and Lori-Etta Taub; The Book of Negroes (BET) – Damon D'Oliveira and Clement Virgo; Luther (BBC) – Marcus Wilson; Show Me a Hero (HBO) – Gail Mutrux	**Dee Rees – Bessie (HBO)**; Angela Bassett – Whitney (Lifetime); Regina King – Let the Church Say Amen (BET); John Ridley – American Crime (ABC); Clement Virgo – The Book of Negroes (BET)
Best Actor in a TV Movie or Limited Series	Best Actress in a TV Movie or Limited Series
**David Oyelowo – Nightingale (HBO)**; Steve Harris – Let the Church Say Amen (BET); James Earl Jones – Great Performances: "Driving Miss Daisy" (PBS); Amin Joseph – Stock Option (TVOne); Michael K. Williams – The Spoils Before Dying (IFC)	**Queen Latifah – Bessie (HBO)**; Yaya DaCosta – Whitney (Lifetime); Aunjanue Ellis – The Book of Negroes (BET); Regina Hall – With This Ring (Lifetime); Shanice Williams – The Wiz Live! (NBC)
Best Supporting Actor in a TV Movie or Limited Series	Best Supporting Actress in a TV Movie or Limited Series
**Bokeem Woodbine – Fargo (FX)**; Charles S. Dutton – Bessie (HBO); Cuba Gooding Jr. – The Book of Negroes (BET); David Alan Grier – The Wiz Live! (NBC); Michael K. Williams – Bessie (HBO)	**Regina King – American Crime (ABC)**; Angela Bassett – American Horror Story: Hotel (FX); Mary J. Blige – The Wiz Live! (NBC); Mo’Nique – Bessie (HBO); Amber Riley – The Wiz Live! (NBC)
Outstanding Screenplay in a TV Movie or Limited Series	Best Television Documentary or Special
**John Ridley – American Crime (ABC)**; Christopher Cleveland, Bettina Gilois and Dee Rees – Bessie (HBO); Stacy A. Littlejohn – American Crime (ABC); David Simon and William F. Zorzi – Show Me a Hero (HBO); Clement Virgo – The Book of Negroes (BET)	**The Wiz Live! (NBC) – Kenny Leon**; 3 ½ Minutes (HBO) – Marc Silver; Holler If You Hear Me: Black and Gay in the Church (BET) – Clay Cane; Kareem: Minority of One (HBO) – Clare Lewins; Stevie Wonder Songs in the Key of Life: An All-Star Grammy Tribute (CBS) – Leon Knoles
