= Florida Film Critics Circle Awards 2015 =

Annual US film awards ceremony

20th FFCC Awards

December 23, 2015

Best Picture:
Mad Max: Fury Road

The 20th Florida Film Critics Circle Awards were held on December 23, 2015.

The nominations were announced on December 21, 2015, led by Carol with eight nominations.

== Winners and nominees ==
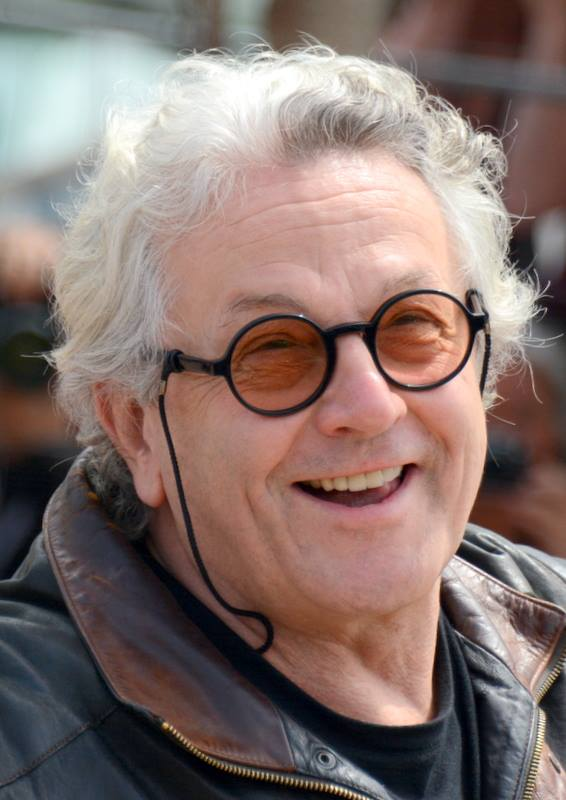
George Miller, Best Director winner

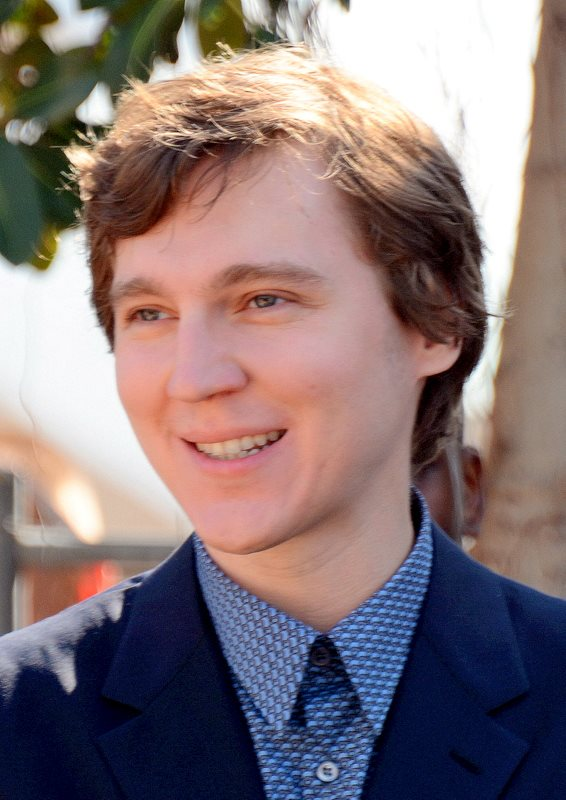
Paul Dano, Best Actor winner

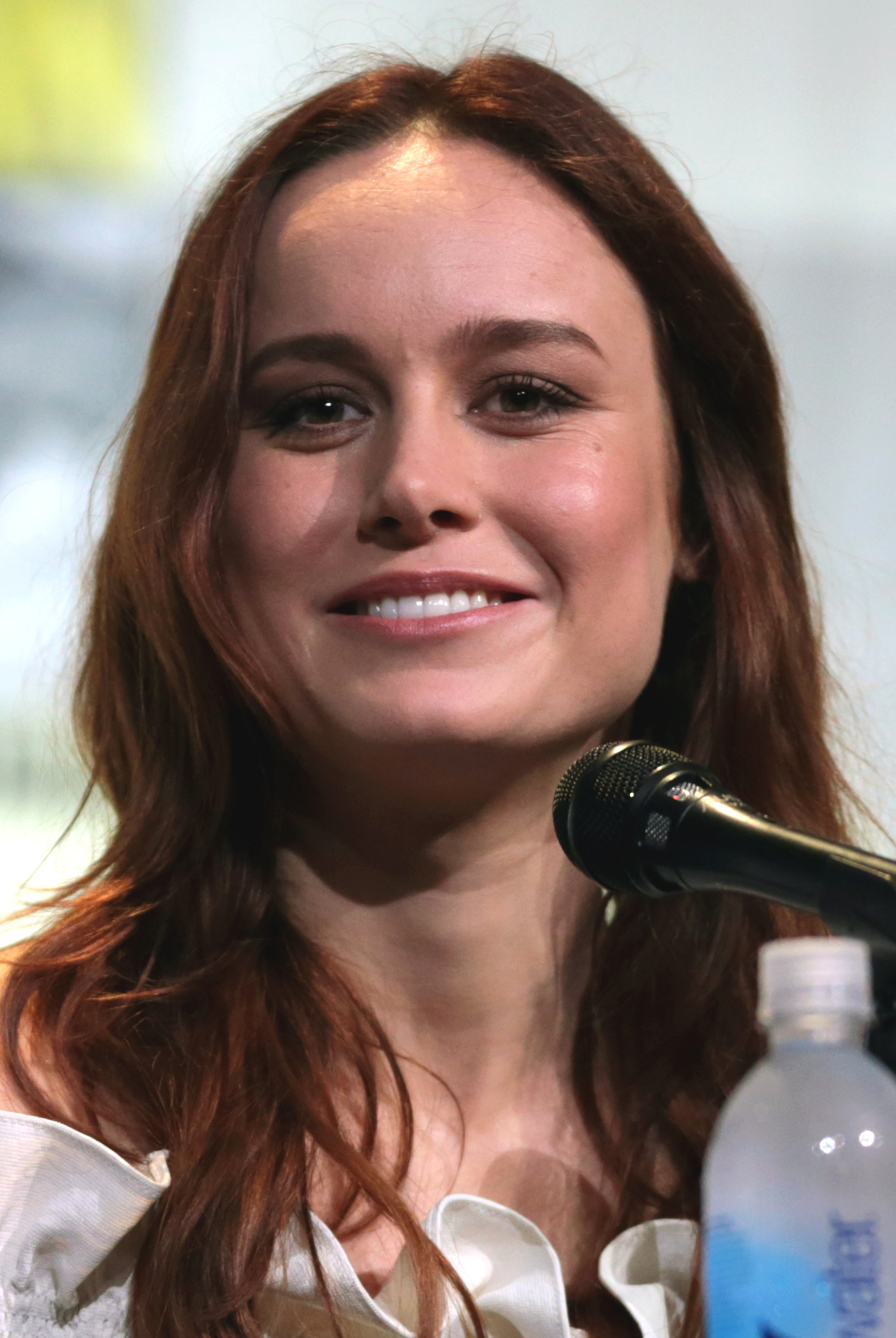
Brie Larson, Best Actress winner

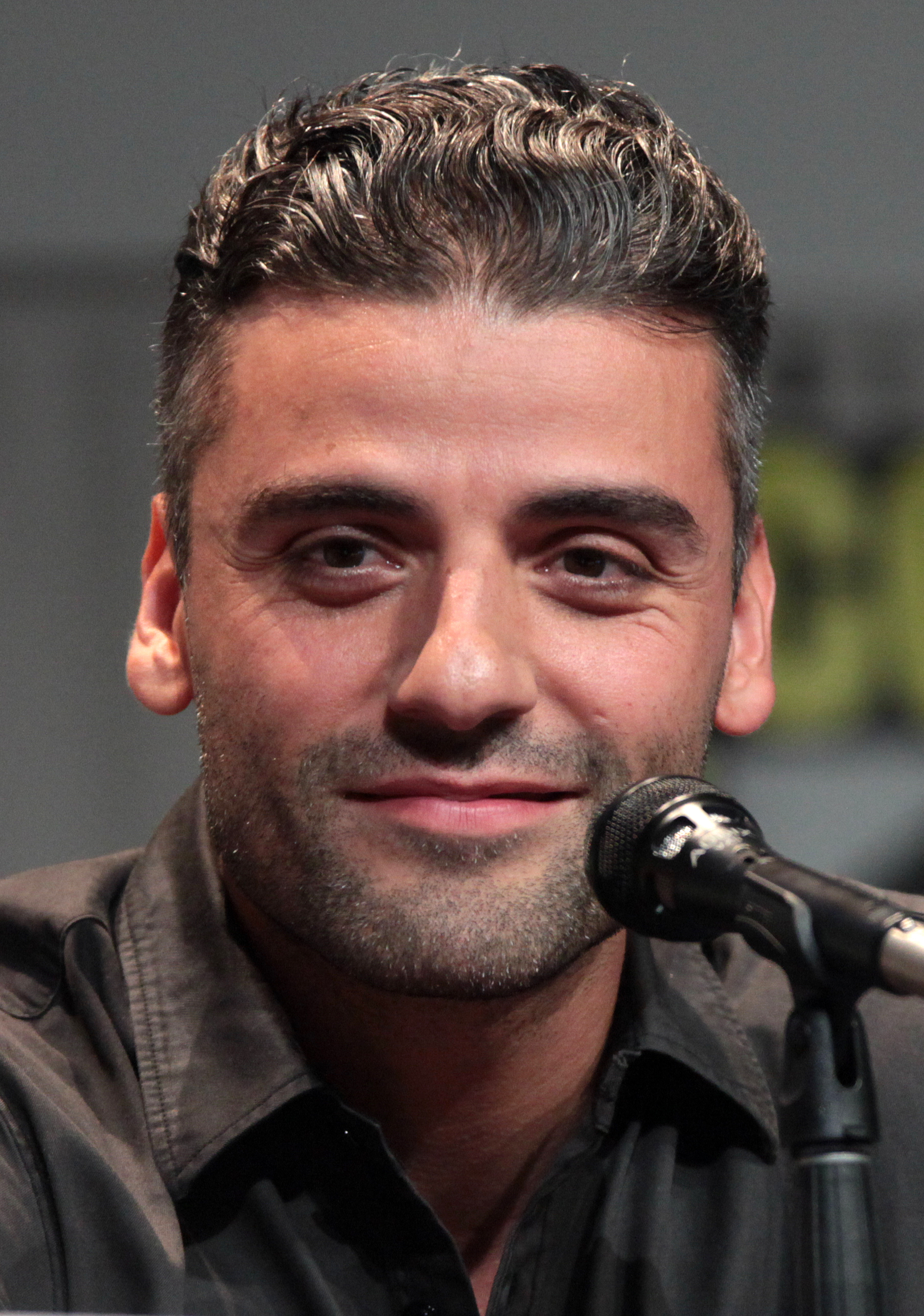
Oscar Isaac, Best Supporting Actor winner

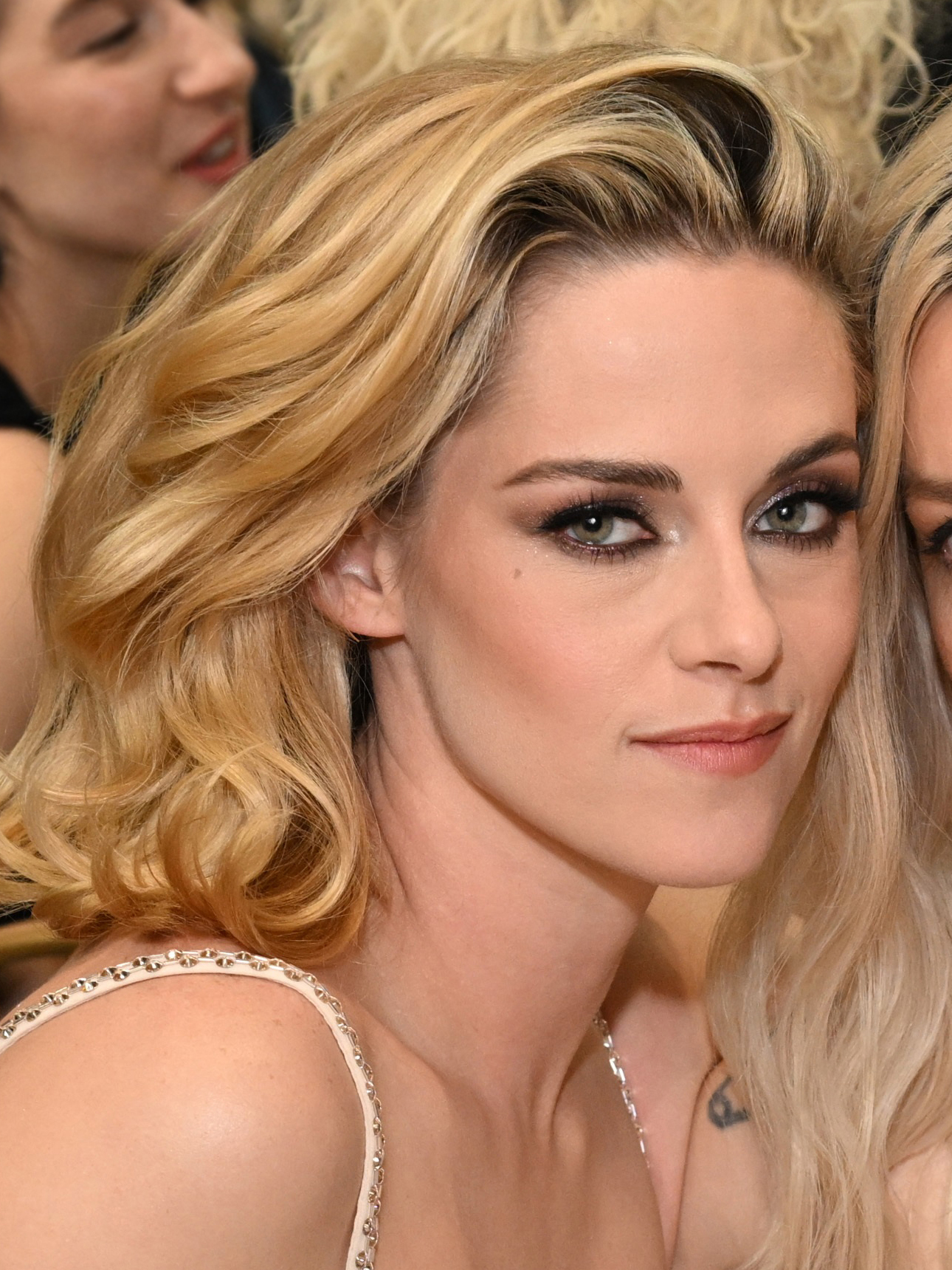
Kristen Stewart, Best Supporting Actress winner

Winners are listed at the top of each list in bold, while the runner-ups for each category are listed under them.

Best Film	Best Director
**Mad Max: Fury Road**: Runner-up: Spotlight; The Big Short; Carol; The Martian	**George Miller – Mad Max: Fury Road**: Runner-up: Todd Haynes – Carol; Alejandro G. Iñárritu – The Revenant; Tom McCarthy – Spotlight; Ridley Scott – The Martian
Best Actor	Best Actress
**Paul Dano – Love & Mercy as Brian Wilson**: Runner-up: Leonardo DiCaprio – The Revenant as Hugh Glass; Bryan Cranston – Trumbo as Dalton Trumbo; Michael Fassbender – Steve Jobs as Steve Jobs; Eddie Redmayne – The Danish Girl as Einar Wegener / Lili Elbe	**Brie Larson – Room as Joy "Ma" Newsome**: Runner-up: Charlotte Rampling – 45 Years as Kate Mercer; Cate Blanchett – Carol as Carol Aird; Saoirse Ronan – Brooklyn as Ellis Lacey; Charlize Theron – Mad Max: Fury Road as Imperator Furiosa
Best Supporting Actor	Best Supporting Actress
**Oscar Isaac – Ex Machina as Nathan Bateman**: Runner-up: Michael Shannon – 99 Homes as Rick Carver; Mark Ruffalo – Spotlight as Michael Rezendes; Mark Rylance – Bridge of Spies as Rudolf Abel; Sylvester Stallone – Creed as Rocky Balboa	**Kristen Stewart – Clouds of Sils Maria as Valentine**: Runner-up: Jennifer Jason Leigh – The Hateful Eight as Daisy Domergue; Elizabeth Banks – Love & Mercy as Melinda Ledbetter; Rooney Mara – Carol as Therese Belivet; Alicia Vikander – Ex Machina as Ava
Best Adapted Screenplay	Best Original Screenplay
**Adam McKay and Charles Randolph – The Big Short**: Runner-up: Phyllis Nagy – Carol; Brooklyn; Room; Steve Jobs	**Tom McCarthy and Josh Singer – Spotlight**: Runner-up: Noah Baumbach and Greta Gerwig – Mistress America; Ex Machina; The Hateful Eight; Inside Out
Best Animated Film	Best Documentary
**Inside Out**: Runner-up: Anomalisa; The Good Dinosaur; The Peanuts Movie; Shaun the Sheep Movie	**Amy**: Runner-up: Heart of a Dog; Best of Enemies; Cartel Land; The Look of Silence
Best Foreign Language Film	Best Ensemble
**The Assassin**: Runner-up: Mommy; Mustang; Phoenix; Son of Saul	**Spotlight**: Runner-up: Tangerine; The Big Short; Mistress America; Straight Outta Compton
Best Art Direction / Production Design	Best Cinematography
**Carol**: Runner-up: Mad Max: Fury Road; Brooklyn; Crimson Peak; Love & Mercy	**John Seale – Mad Max: Fury Road**: Runner-up: Edward Lachman – Carol; The Revenant; Sicario; Youth
Best Score	Best Visual Effects
**Love & Mercy**: Runner-up: Carol; The Hateful Eight; Mad Max: Fury Road; Star Wars: The Force Awakens	**Mad Max: Fury Road**: Runner-up: Star Wars: The Force Awakens; Ex Machina; The Martian; The Walk
Pauline Kael Breakout Award
**Daisy Ridley – Star Wars: The Force Awakens as Rey**: Runner-up: Alicia Vikander – Ex Machina and The Danish Girl as Ava and Gerda Wegener; Bel Powley – The Diary of a Teenage Girl as Minnie Goetze; Kitana Kiki Rodriguez – Tangerine as Sin-Dee Rella; Jacob Tremblay – Room as Jack Newsome
