= Black Reel Award for Outstanding Supporting Actress =

Award presented annually by the Black Reel Awards

- Awarded for: Outstanding Supporting Actress
- Country: United States
- Presented by: Black Reel Awards (BRAs)
- First award: 2000
- Final award: 2023
- Final winner: Angela Bassett; Black Panther: Wakanda Forever

Highlights
- Most awards: Viola Davis (2)
- Most nominations: Octavia Spencer (6)
- Website: blackreelawards.com

The Black Reel Award for Outstanding Supporting Actress was an award presented annually by the Black Reel Awards (BRAs). It was given to honor an actress who has delivered an outstanding performance in a supporting role while working within the film industry.

Erykah Badu was the first winner of The Cider House Rules at the 1st Annual Black Reel Awards in 2000. Since its inception, the award has been given out to 21 actresses. Viola Davis is the current record holder with most wins in this category with two, while Octavia Spencer holds the record for most nominations in this category with six. Janelle Monáe and Kerry Washington have the most nominations in this category without a win. Monáe is the only actress to earn multiple nominations in the same year for Moonlight and Hidden Figures at the 17th Annual Black Reel Awards.

Gloria Foster became the first posthumous acting nominee in Black Reel Awards history when she earned a nomination for The Matrix Reloaded at the 4th Annual Black Reel Awards. Eartha Kitt is the first and only actress to earn a nomination in this category for an animated performance prior to the introduction of the Outstanding Voice Performance category in 2009.

At age 25, Jennifer Hudson became the youngest winner in this category for Dreamgirls and at age 62, Phylicia Rashad became the oldest winner in this category for For Colored Girls.

The award was discontinued at the 24th Black Reel Awards and merged with Outstanding Supporting Actor in favor of a single gender-neutral award, Outstanding Supporting Performance.

== Winners and nominees ==
Winners are listed first and highlighted in bold.

=== 2000s ===
Year	Actress	Film	Ref
2000
2000	**Erykah Badu**	**The Cider House Rules**	
2000	Angela Bassett	Music of the Heart	
2000	Lisa Gay Hamilton	True Crime	
2000	Rebekah Johnson	Liberty Heights	
2000	Queen Latifah	The Bone Collector	
2001
2001	**Gabrielle Union**	**Bring It On**	
2001	Lisa Bonet	High Fidelity	
2001	Eartha Kitt	The Emperor's New Groove	
2001	Nia Long	Boiler Room	
2001	Sheryl Lee Ralph	Deterrence	
2002
2002	**Nona Gaye**	**Ali**	
2002	Marla Gibbs	The Visit	
2002	Adrienne-Joi Johnson	Baby Boy	
2002	Gabrielle Union	The Brothers	
2002	Kerry Washington	Save the Last Dance	
2003
2003	**Queen Latifah**	**Chicago**	
2003	Halle Berry	Die Another Day	
2003	Joy Bryant	Antwone Fisher	
2003	Viola Davis	Solaris	
2003	Rosario Dawson	25th Hour	
2004
2004	**Anna Deavere Smith**	**The Human Stain**	
2004	Mary Alice	The Matrix Revolutions	
2004	Gloria Foster (posthumous)	The Matrix Reloaded	
2004	Vivica A. Fox	Kill Bill: Volume 1	
2004	Michael Michele	Dark Blue	
2005
2005	**Sharon Warren**	**Ray**	
2005	Joy Bryant	BAADASSSSS!	
2005	Kimberly Elise	The Manchurian Candidate	
2005	Nia Long	Alfie	
2005	Jada Pinkett Smith	Collateral	
2006
2006	**Taraji P. Henson**	**Hustle & Flow**	
2006	Rosario Dawson	Sin City	
2006	Thandie Newton	Crash	
2006	Wanda Sykes	Monster-in-Law	
2006	Tracie Thoms	Rent	
2007
2007	**Jennifer Hudson**	**Dreamgirls**	
2007	Clare-Hope Ashitey	Children of Men	
2007	Angela Bassett	Akeelah and the Bee	
2007	Shareeka Epps	Half Nelson	
2007	Kerry Washington	The Last King of Scotland	
2008
2008	**Viola Davis**	**Doubt**	
2008	Alice Braga	Blindness	
2008	Penélope Cruz	Vicky Cristina Barcelona	
2008	Taraji P. Henson	The Curious Case of Benjamin Button	
2008	Sophie Okonedo	The Secret Life of Bees	

=== 2010s ===
Year	Actress	Film	Ref
2010
2010	**Mo'Nique**	**Precious**	
2010	Mariah Carey	Precious	
2010	Paula Patton	Precious	
2010	Zoe Saldana	Avatar	
2010	Alfre Woodard	American Violet	
2011
2011	**Phylicia Rashad**	**For Colored Girls**	
2011	Viola Davis	Eat Pray Love	
2011	Shareeka Epps	Mother and Child	
2011	Janet Jackson	For Colored Girls	
2011	Kerry Washington	For Colored Girls	
2012
2012	**Octavia Spencer**	**The Help**	
2012	Angela Bassett	Jumping the Broom	
2012	Maya Rudolph	Bridesmaids	
2012	Pernell Walker	Pariah	
2012	Kim Wayans	Pariah	
2013
2013	**Naomie Harris**	**Skyfall**	
2013	Octavia Spencer	Smashed	
2013	Lorraine Toussaint	Middle of Nowhere	
2013	Tamara Tunie	Flight	
2013	Kerry Washington	Django Unchained	
2014
2014	**Lupita Nyong'o**	**12 Years a Slave**	
2014	Melonie Diaz	Fruitvale Station	
2014	Naomie Harris	Mandela: Long Walk to Freedom	
2014	Octavia Spencer	Fruitvale Station	
2014	Oprah Winfrey	The Butler	
2015
2015	**Carmen Ejogo**	**Selma**	
2015	Viola Davis	The Disappearance of Eleanor Rigby	
2015	Teyonah Parris	Dear White People	
2015	Zoe Saldaña	Guardians of the Galaxy	
2015	Octavia Spencer	Snowpiercer	
2016
2016	**Tessa Thompson**	**Creed**	
2016	Angela Bassett	Chi-Raq	
2016	Zoë Kravitz	Dope	
2016	Gugu Mbatha-Raw	Concussion	
2016	Mya Taylor	Tangerine	
2017
2017	**Viola Davis**	**Fences**	
2017	Naomie Harris	Moonlight	
2017	Janelle Monáe	Hidden Figures	
2017	Janelle Monáe	Moonlight	
2017	Lupita Nyong'o	Queen of Katwe	
2018
2018	**Tiffany Haddish**	**Girls Trip**	
2018	Betty Gabriel	Get Out	
2018	Mary J. Blige	Mudbound	
2018	Octavia Spencer	The Shape of Water	
2018	Tessa Thompson	Thor: Ragnarok	
2019
2019	**Regina King**	If Beale Street Could Talk	
2019	Letitia Wright	Black Panther	
2019	Danai Gurira	Black Panther	
2019	Lupita Nyong'o	Black Panther	
2019	Simone Missick	Jinn	

=== 2020s ===
Year	Actress	Film	Ref
2020
2020	**Da’Vine Joy Randolph**	**Dolemite Is My Name**	
2020	Janelle Monae	Harriet	
2020	Shahadi Wright Joseph	Us	
2020	Octavia Spencer	Luce	
2020	Taylor Russell	Waves	
2021
2021	**Dominique Fishback**	**Judas and the Black Messiah**	
2021	Alexis Chikaeze	Miss Juneteenth	
2021	KiKi Layne	The Old Guard	
2021	Tracee Ellis Ross	The High Note	
2021	Gabourey Sidibe	Antebellum	
2022
2022	**Aunjanue Ellis-Taylor**	**King Richard**	
2022	Ariana DeBose	West Side Story	
2022	Regina King	The Harder They Fall	
2022	Rita Moreno	West Side Story	
2022	Ruth Negga	Passing	
2023
2023	**Angela Bassett**	**Black Panther: Wakanda Forever**	
2023	Thuso Mbedu	The Woman King	
2023	Janelle Monáe	Glass Onion: A Knives Out Mystery	
2023	Keke Palmer	Nope	
2023	Gabrielle Union	The Inspection	

== Multiple nominations and wins ==
=== Multiple wins ===
2 Wins

- Viola Davis

=== Multiple nominations ===
6 Nominations

- Octavia Spencer

5 Nominations

- Angela Bassett
- Viola Davis

4 Nominations

- Janelle Monae
- Kerry Washington

3 Nominations

- Naomie Harris
- Lupita Nyong'o
- Gabrielle Union

2 Nominations

- Joy Bryant
- Rosario Dawson
- Shareeka Epps
- Taraji P. Henson
- Regina King
- Queen Latifah
- Nia Long
- Zoe Saldaña
- Tessa Thompson

== Multiple nominations from the same film ==
- Mo'Nique (winner), Mariah Carey and Paula Patton in Precious (2010)
- Phylicia Rashad (winner), Janet Jackson and Kerry Washington in For Colored Girls (2011)
- Pernell Walker and Kim Wayans in Pariah (2011)
- Naomie Harris & Janelle Monae in Moonlight (2017)
- Danai Gurira, Lupita Nyong'o & Letitia Wright in Black Panther (2019)
- Ariana DeBose & Rita Moreno in West Side Story (2022)

== Age superlatives ==
Record	Actress	Film	Age (in years)
Oldest winner	Phylicia Rashad	For Colored Girls	62
Oldest nominee	Rita Moreno	West Side Story	90
Youngest winner	Jennifer Hudson	Dreamgirls	25
Youngest nominee	Shahadi Wright Joseph	Us	14
