= 2015 Deauville American Film Festival =

- Festival poster
- Opening film: Everest
- Closing film: Sicario
- Location: Deauville, France
- Hosted by: Deauville American Film Festival Group
- No. of films: 36 feature films
- Festival date: September 4, 2015–September 13, 2015
- Language: International
- Website: www.festival-deauville.com

The 41st Deauville American Film Festival took place at Deauville, France from September 4 to 13, 2015. Baltasar Kormákur's biographical disaster film Everest served as the opening night film. Sicario by Denis Villeneuve was the closing night film of the festival. The Grand Prix was awarded to 99 Homes by Ramin Bahrani.

Complete lineup for the festival was announced on August 24, 2015. Total of 36 feature films were screened at the festival, 14 of which were in competition. In Television section, three episodes of Michael Connelly and Eric Overmyer's crime TV-series Bosch were screened. The festival paid tribute to Orson Welles, Terrence Malick, Ian McKellen, Patricia Clarkson, Keanu Reeves, Michael Bay, Lawrence Bender and Orlando Bloom and hosted retrospective of their films. Robert Pattinson and Elizabeth Olsen received Le Nouvel Hollywood (Hollywood Rising Star) awards.

== Juries ==
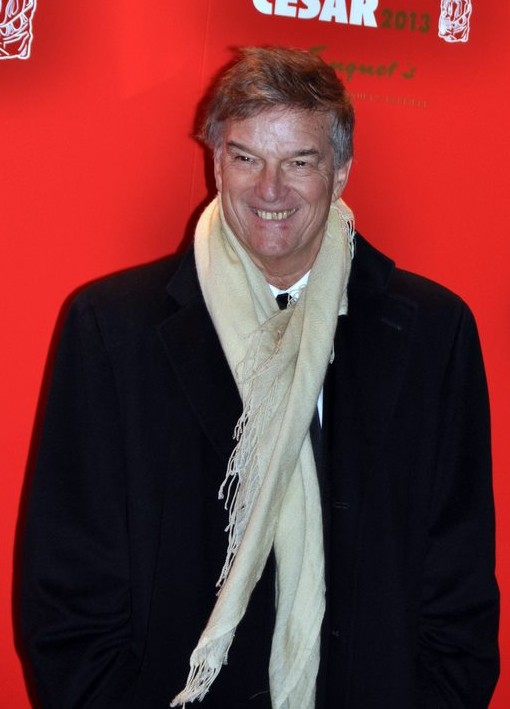
Benoît Jacquot, Main Jury President

=== Main Competition ===
- Benoît Jacquot: French film director and screenwriter (President of Jury)
- Pascal Bonitzer: French film critic, screenwriter and director
- Louise Bourgoin: French actress
- Louis-Do De Lencquesaing: French actor and director
- Marc Dugain: French novelist
- Sophie Fillières: French screenwriter and director
- Marie Gillain: Belgian actress
- Julien Hirsch: French cinematographer
- Marthe Keller: Swiss actress and opera director

=== Cartier revelation jury ===
- Zabou Breitman: French actress and director (President of Jury)
- Alice Isaaz: French actress
- Rachelle Lefevre: Canadian actress
- Géraldine Nakache: French actress, screenwriter and director
- Stanley Weber: French actor and theatre director

== Programme ==
=== Competition ===
- 99 Homes by Ramin Bahrani
- Songs My Brothers Taught Me by Chloé Zhao
- Cop Car by Jon Watts
- Dope by Rick Famuyiwa
- Tangerine by Sean Baker
- Day Out of Days by Zoe Cassavetes
- Babysitter by Morgan Krantz
- Dixieland by Hank Bedford
- Emelie by Michael Thelin
- James White by Josh Mond
- Madame Bovary by Sophie Barthes
- Krisha by Trey Edward Schultz
- Green Room by Jeremy Saulnier
- The Diary of a Teenage Girl by Marielle Heller

=== Les Premières (Premieres) ===
- Everest by Baltasar Kormakur
- The Man From U.N.C.L.E. by Guy Ritchie
- Trainwreck by Judd Apatow
- Danny Collins by Dan Fogelman
- Experimenter by Michael Almereyda
- Sleeping with Other People by Leslye Headland
- Knight of Cups by Terrence Malick
- Knock, Knock by Eli Roth
- Pawn Sacrifice by Ed Zwick
- The Prophet by Roger Allers
- Life by Anton Corbijn
- Mr. Holmes by Bill Condon
- October Gale by Ruba Nadda
- Ruth and Alex by Richard Loncraine
- The Green Inferno by Eli Roth
- Sicario by Denis Villeneuve

=== Les Docs De L'Oncle Sam (Uncle Sam's Doc) ===
- Altman by Ron Mann
- Hitchcock/Truffaut by Kent Jones
- Janis by Penny Lane
- Steve McQueen: The Man & Le Mans by Gabriel Clarke and John McKenna
- This is Orson Welles by Clara Kuperberg and Julia Kuperberg
- The Wolfpack by Crystal Moselle

=== Television ===
- Bosch by Michael Connelly and Eric Overmyer

== Awards ==
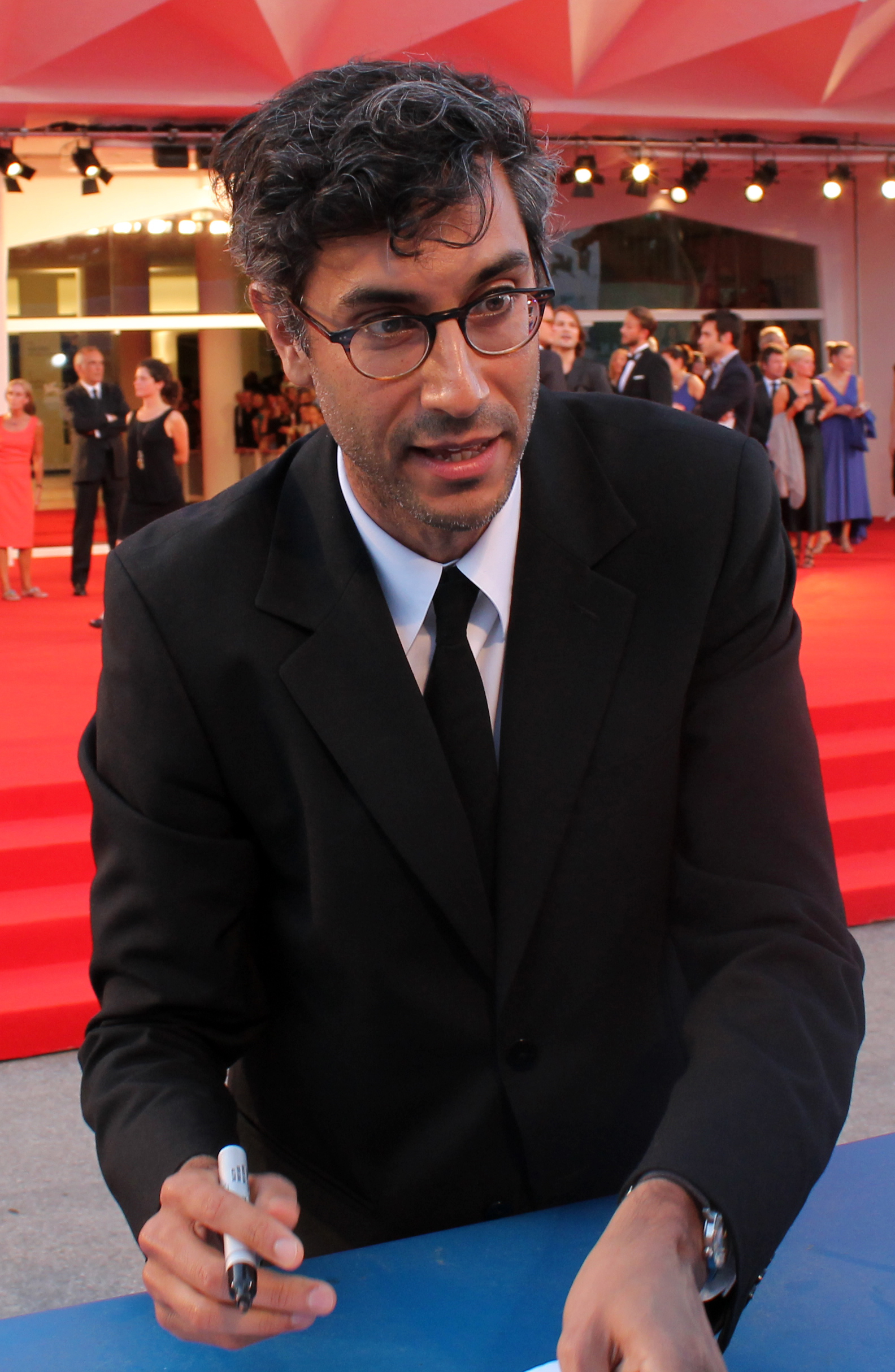
Ramin Bahrani, won Grand Prix at the festival.

The festival awarded the following awards:

- Grand Prix (Grand Special Prize): 99 Homes by Ramin Bahrani
- Prix du Jury (Jury Special Prize): Tangerine by Sean Baker
- Prix du Public (Audience Award): Dope by Rick Famuyiwa
- Prix de la Critique Internationale (International Critics' prize): Krisha by Trey Edward Schultz
- Prix Michel d'Ornano (Michel d'Ornano Award for debut French film): The Cowboys by Thomas Bidegain
- Prix de la Révélation Cartier (Cartier Revelation Prize): James White by Josh Mond
- Lucien Barrière Prize for Literature:
  - All Our Names by Dinaw Mengestu
- Tributes:
  - Orson Welles
  - Terrence Malick
  - Ian McKellen
  - Patricia Clarkson
  - Keanu Reeves
  - Michael Bay
  - Lawrence Bender
  - Orlando Bloom
- Le Nouvel Hollywood (Hollywood Rising Star):
  - Robert Pattinson
  - Elizabeth Olsen
