= Ben Bowman =

Ben Bowman may refer to:

- Ben Bowman (director), American film director and screenwriter
- Ben Bowman (politician) (born 1992), majority leader of the Oregon House of Representatives

== See also ==
- Benjamin Bowman (born 1979), American-Canadian violinist
