= San Francisco Bay Area Film Critics Circle Award for Best Supporting Actress =

Annual US film award

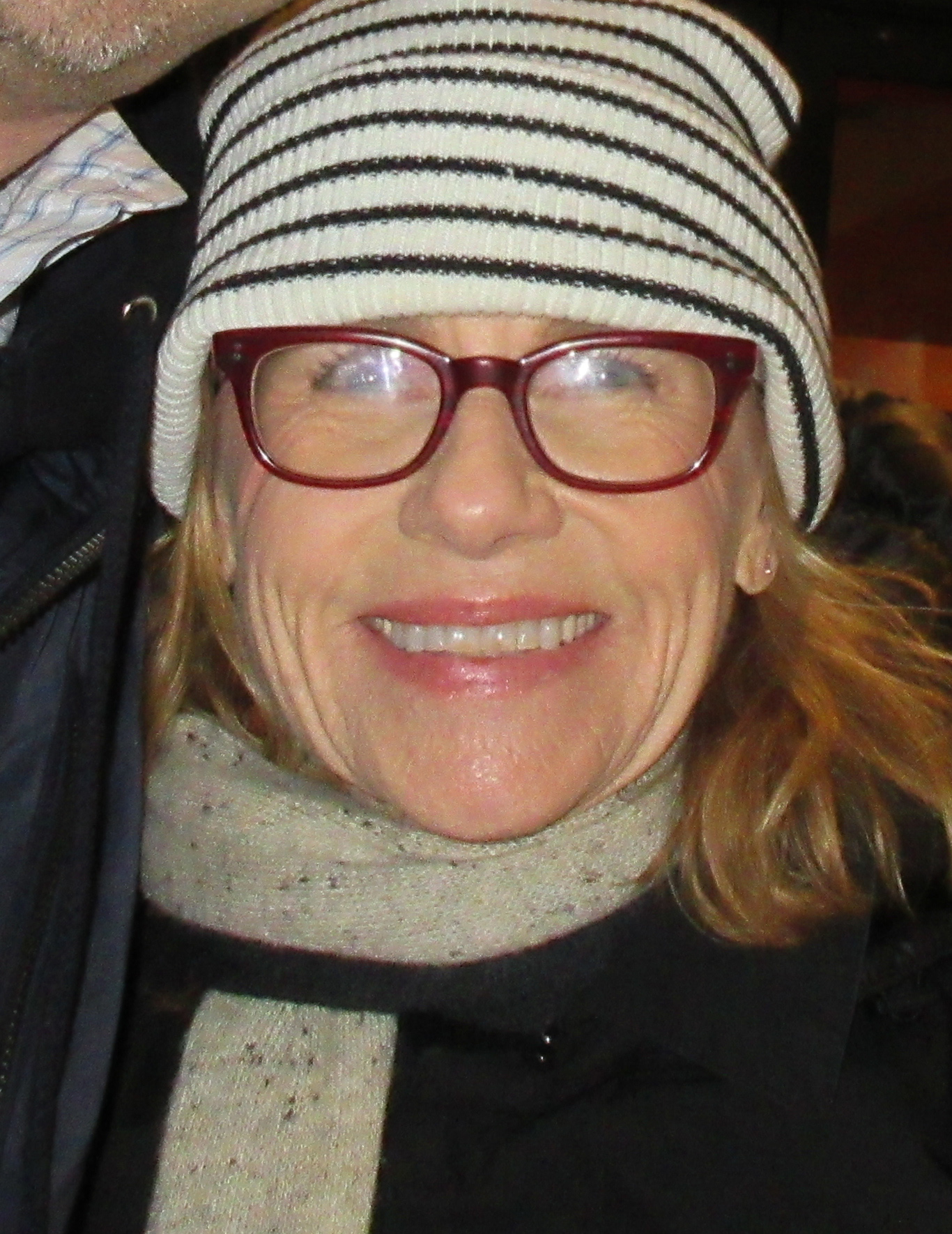
- The 2025 Recipient: Amy Madigan
- Awarded for: Best Performance by an Actress in a Supporting Role
- Country: United States
- Presented by: San Francisco Bay Area Film Critics Circle
- First award: Miranda Richardson; Spider (2002)
- Currently held by: Amy Madigan; Weapons (2025)
- Website: sfbafcc.com

The San Francisco Bay Area Film Critics Circle Award for Best Supporting Actress is an award given by the San Francisco Bay Area Film Critics Circle to honor an actress who has delivered an outstanding performance in a supporting role.

== Winners ==
=== 2000s ===
Year	Winner	Film	Role
2002	Miranda Richardson	Spider	Yvonne / Mrs. Cleg
2003	Patricia Clarkson	Pieces of April	Joy Burns
2004	Virginia Madsen	Sideways	Maya
2005	Amy Adams	Junebug	Ashley Johnsten
2006	Adriana Barraza	Babel	Amelia
2007	Amy Ryan	Gone Baby Gone	Helene McCready
2008	Marisa Tomei	The Wrestler	Cassidy / Pam
2009	Mo'Nique	Precious	Mary Jones

=== 2010s ===
Year	Winner	Film	Role
2010	Jacki Weaver	Animal Kingdom	Janine "Smurf" Cody
2011	Vanessa Redgrave	Coriolanus	Volumnia
2012	Helen Hunt	The Sessions	Cheryl Cohen-Greene
2013	Jennifer Lawrence	American Hustle	Rosalyn Rosenfeld
2014	Patricia Arquette	Boyhood	Olivia Evans
2015	Mya Taylor	Tangerine	Alexandra
2016	Viola Davis	Fences	Rose Maxson
2017	Laurie Metcalf	Lady Bird	Marion McPherson
2018	Regina King	If Beale Street Could Talk	Sharon Rivers
2019	Jennifer Lopez	Hustlers	Ramona Vega

=== 2020s ===
Year	Winner	Film	Role
2020	Youn Yuh-jung	Minari	Soon-ja
2021	Kirsten Dunst	The Power of the Dog	Rose Gordon
2022	Kerry Condon	The Banshees of Inisherin	Siobhán Súilleabháin
2022	Jamie Lee Curtis	Everything Everywhere All at Once	Deirdre Beaubeirdre
2023	Da'Vine Joy Randolph	The Holdovers	Mary Lamb
2024	Joan Chen	Dìdi	Chungsing Wang
2025	Amy Madigan	Weapons	Gladys
