= Girls Trip =

2017 American film by Malcolm D. Lee

- Theatrical release poster
- Directed by: Malcolm D. Lee
- Screenplay by: Kenya Barris; Tracy Oliver
- Story by: Erica Rivinoja; Kenya Barris; Tracy Oliver
- Produced by: Will Packer; Malcolm D. Lee
- Starring: Regina Hall; Tiffany Haddish; Larenz Tate; Mike Colter; Kate Walsh; Jada Pinkett Smith; Queen Latifah
- Cinematography: Greg Gardiner
- Edited by: Paul Millspaugh
- Music by: David Newman
- Production companies: Will Packer Productions; Perfect World Pictures
- Distributed by: Universal Pictures
- Release dates: June 14, 2017 (American Black Film Festival); July 21, 2017 (United States)
- Running time: 122 minutes
- Country: United States
- Language: English
- Budget: $19 million
- Box office: $140.9 million

Girls Trip is a 2017 American comedy film starring Regina Hall, Tiffany Haddish, Jada Pinkett Smith and Queen Latifah. The film is directed by Malcolm D. Lee and written by Kenya Barris and Tracy Oliver, from a story by the pair and Erica Rivinoja, who based the script off their own experiences with their female friends. The film follows a group of four friends who go to New Orleans to attend the Essence Music Festival in order to reconnect after a long time.

The film premiered in June 2017 and received multiple awards and nominations, most notably at the 49th NAACP Image Awards, with Haddish's performance receiving critical acclaim. A sequel has long been in development; in March 2025, one of the film's producers announced that the project had a completed script and that all four stars would be returning.

== Plot ==
In an attempt to reconnect with her friends from college, lifestyle guru Ryan Pierce, dubbed "the next Oprah," decides to invite her friends on a girls' trip to Essence Music Festival in New Orleans, where she will be the keynote speaker.

Known as the "Flossy Posse," the group includes:

- Sasha, a former journalist for Time magazine who now owns a floundering gossip site and is struggling financially;
- Lisa, a nurse and uptight single mother who has not had a boyfriend since her divorce years earlier;
- Dina, a happy-go-lucky, impulsive party animal who was fired from her job after harming a co-worker who accidentally ate her lunch.

Shortly after arriving, Sasha receives a photo of Ryan's husband Stewart kissing another woman. The friends are reluctant to tell Ryan initially, but Ryan admits she is already aware of the situation and informs her friends that the two are in couple's therapy to address Stewart's infidelity. After Dina confronts Stewart at their hotel with a broken bottle, the Flossy Posse are ejected and settles into a one-star motel instead. At the Essence Fest later that night, they run into an old friend Julian, a musician performing at the festival who Ryan flirts with. He later gives up his hotel suite so that the women have somewhere decent to stay.

The next day, Ryan and Stewart host a cooking demonstration together at the music festival that goes awry when Stewart's mistress, Simone, shows up. A potential investor is impressed, however, and a business meeting is set up for Ryan and Stewart with their agent, Elizabeth, who then introduces Ryan and Stewart to Bethany Marshall. Dina serves the women drinks spiked with absinthe right before the meeting, causing them to hallucinate. At her meeting, Ryan thinks the waitress is Stewart's mistress; Lisa thinks her kids are at the club with her; Dina thinks she is flying; and Sasha thinks she is making out with an attractive man who is actually a lamp. The girls eventually pull Ryan out of the meeting and decide to go to a club to dance the absinthe off. They run into Simone and her friends and engage in a dance off before getting in a bar fight. Julian picks them up before they can get arrested and takes them back to their hotel.

Ryan and Stewart are offered a massive deal from the chain store Best Mart, whose representative wants to hire them as spokespeople. Ryan goes out to celebrate with the girls at one of Julian's shows. Simone shows up and tells Sasha that she is pregnant. She offers to give Sasha's blog exclusive content to her affair with pictures as well. Stewart once again goes to Ryan to convince her to stay with him to finalize their deal. Simone goes public with the affair, and Ryan accuses Sasha of being the one who leaked the pictures. The fight spills out into the relationship of all the women and they all part on bad terms.

Dina and Lisa make up quickly. After Sasha decides to take down her blog, disgusted with the celebrity gossip racket, Dina and Lisa reunite with her. As Ryan begins to give her keynote speech on the last day of the music festival and denies that the picture of Stewart and Simone is real, she sees her friends walk into the room. Ryan breaks from her scripted remarks, admitting the picture and affair are real.

The speech is a success and, when the women reunite after the show, Ryan apologizes to Sasha. Ryan's agent arrives and tells Ryan that the deal with Best Mart is still on but with her alone. Ryan decides to take Sasha as her business partner the way they planned to be years ago. A series of events shows the girls happily reunited and Ryan beginning a relationship with Julian.

== Cast ==
- Regina Hall as Ryan Pierce
- Tiffany Haddish as Dina
- Jada Pinkett Smith as Lisa Miller Cooper
- Queen Latifah as Sasha Franklin
- Larenz Tate as Julian Stevens
- Mike Colter as Stewart Pierce
- Kate Walsh as Elizabeth Davelli
- Kofi Siriboe as Malik
- Deborah Ayorinde as Simone
- Lara Grice as Bethany
- Tonea Stewart as Aunt Marian
- Mike Epps as Absinthe Dealer

Amongst the cast, multiple celebrities and musicians make cameos, most notably Common, D-Nice, Diddy, Estelle, Mase, Ne-Yo, Morris Chestnut, Ava DuVernay, Faith Evans, and Mariah Carey.

== Production ==
In February 2014, Universal announced that director Malcolm D. Lee and producer Will Packer would collaborate on a film tentatively titled Girls Trip, with South Park writer Erica Rivinoja attached to script.

In May 2016, Universal set a release date of August 11, 2017 for the film. It was also reported that Regina Hall would star, and Kenya Barris and Tracy Oliver were rewriting the script. Oliver told The Hollywood Reporter that she wanted to break down the barriers of respectability politics and portray "Black women being carefree and having fun just like everybody else. I think we need to show all aspects of black lives. I love Moonlight, I love Hidden Figures, but I also want to see some people who are having fun and just showing female friends hanging out." Queen Latifah and Jada Pinkett Smith joined the cast in early June 2016, and Larenz Tate joined later that month.

The film's release date was changed to July 21, 2017, as principal photography began in late June 2016 in New Orleans, and included filming at the 2016 Essence Music Festival, casting over 5000 background actors.

A teaser trailer for the film was released on January 31, 2017. A red band trailer for the film was released on February 9, 2017.

== Release ==
Girls Trip premiered at the American Black Film Festival in Miami on June 14, 2017, and was theatrically released in the United States by Universal Pictures on July 21, 2017.

== Soundtrack ==
Girls Trip (Original Motion Picture Soundtrack)

Soundtrack album by various artists
- Released: July 21, 2017
- Genre: Soundtrack
- Length: 51:42
- Label: Back Lot Music

Credits adapted from Tidal.

=== Track listing ===
No.	Title	Performer(s)	Length
1.	"Treat 'Em Right"	Chubb Rock	4:44
2.	"Good Times Roll"	GRiZ, Big Gigantic	4:06
3.	"Lovely Day"	The Soul Rebels	3:16
4.	"Ascension (Don't Ever Wonder)"	Maxwell	5:48
5.	"Because of You (Girls Trip Remix)"	Ne-Yo	3:05
6.	"If It Isn't Love"	New Edition	3:46
7.	"Bling Bling"	B.G.	4:00
8.	"Feel So Good"	Mase	3:27
9.	"She's a Bitch"	Missy Elliott	4:02
10.	"Ain't No Way"	Aretha Franklin	4:13
11.	"Do Whatcha Wanna, Pt. 2"	Rebirth Brass Band	6:21
12.	"Ryan's Theme"	David Newman	4:54
Total length:			51:42

== Reception ==
=== Box office ===
Girls Trip grossed $115.2 million in the United States and Canada and $24.9 million in other territories for a total gross of $140.9 million, against a net production budget of $20–28 million. Deadline Hollywood calculated the film made a net profit of $66.1 million, when factoring together all expenses and revenues.

Girls Trip opened alongside Dunkirk and Valerian and the City of a Thousand Planets on July 21, 2017, and was projected to gross around $20 million from 2,583 theaters, with industry experts saying it could debut as high as $30 million. It made $11.7 million on its first day, including $1.7 million from Thursday night previews at 2,195 theaters. The film grossed $31.2 million in its opening weekend, finishing second at the box office behind Dunkirk and marked the largest opening of director Malcolm D. Lee's career; 52% of its opening weekend audience was African-American, with an overall 60% being women over 25. In its second week the film dropped just 37% and grossed $19.6 million, finishing 3rd at the box office behind Dunkirk and newcomer The Emoji Movie, and in its third week the film made $11.4 million, finishing 4th. On August 17, the film crossed the $100 million mark domestically, becoming the first comedy of 2017 to do so.

It was also a commercial success, grossing $140 million worldwide on its $19 million production budget. It was also the first time a film written by an African-American female screenwriter had earned over $100 million at the box office.

=== Critical response ===
Girls Trip received positive reviews from critics, with many praising the cast performances and the film's originality. It was chosen by Time magazine as one of its top ten films of 2017. On Rotten Tomatoes, the film holds an approval rating of 91% based on 175 reviews, with an average rating of 6.9/10. The site's critics consensus reads: "Girls Trip is the rare R-rated comedy that pushes boundaries to truly comedic effect—and anchors its laughs in compelling characters brought to life by a brilliantly assembled cast." On Metacritic, which assigns a weighted average rating reviews from mainstream critics, the film has a score of 71 out of 100, based on 35 critics, indicating "generally favorable" reviews. Audiences polled by CinemaScore gave the film an average grade of "A+" on an A+ to F scale, and PostTrak reported filmgoers gave it an 82% overall positive score, with 67% saying they would definitely recommend it.

For Variety, Peter Debruge wrote "When it comes to Hollywood studio comedies, most of the time, we are lucky to get one unforgettable set piece, whereas Girls Trip screenwriters Kenya Barris and Tracy Oliver deliver at least half a dozen. And rather than simply letting an effective joke stand, they double down, milking it for all it's worth." For CinemaBlend, Mike Reyes wrote "While there's still plenty of time worn clichés in Girls Trip, there is a genuine sense of friendship, and comedy throughout, that make the film one of this summer's most surprising comedies. You can believe that these four women are the best of friends, which is something that's not always easy or focused on in a comedy of this type. Girls Trip has an energy that's undeniable, eventually winning audience members over with a theme of friendship that's well built in the context of the film."

=== Accolades ===
The film received multiple awards and nominations from various award and critic organizations, including Outstanding Motion Picture and Outstanding Supporting Actress in a Motion Picture for Haddish at the 49th NAACP Image Awards. It received seven nominations at the 18th Black Reel Awards, with Haddish winning two awards for her performance. The film was awarded The ReFrame Stamp for gender parity in its production.

Award	Date of ceremony	Category	Recipients	Result	Ref.
AARP's Movies for Grownups Awards	February 5, 2018	Best Ensemble	The cast of Girls Trip	Nominated	
AARP's Movies for Grownups Awards	February 5, 2018	Readers' Choice Poll	Girls Trip	Nominated	
African-American Film Critics Association	December 12, 2017	Top Ten Films	Girls Trip	4th Place	
African-American Film Critics Association	December 12, 2017	Best Comedy	Girls Trip	Won	
African-American Film Critics Association	December 12, 2017	Best Supporting Actress	Tiffany Haddish	Won	
Black Reel Awards	February 22, 2018	Outstanding Film	Girls Trip	Nominated	
Black Reel Awards	February 22, 2018	Outstanding Director	Malcolm D. Lee	Nominated	
Black Reel Awards	February 22, 2018	Outstanding Supporting Actress	Tiffany Haddish	Won	
Black Reel Awards	February 22, 2018	Outstanding Screenplay	Kenya Barris and Tracy Oliver	Nominated	
Black Reel Awards	February 22, 2018	Outstanding Ensemble	Mary Vernieu and Michelle Wade Byrd	Nominated	
Black Reel Awards	February 22, 2018	Outstanding Score	David Newman	Nominated	
Black Reel Awards	February 22, 2018	Outstanding Breakthrough Performance, Female	Tiffany Haddish	Won	
Casting Society of America	January 18, 2018	Studio or Independent – Comedy	Mary Vernieu, Michelle Wade Byrd and Elizabeth Coulon	Nominated	
Critics' Choice Movie Awards	January 11, 2018	Best Comedy	Girls Trip	Nominated	
Critics' Choice Movie Awards	January 11, 2018	Best Supporting Actress	Tiffany Haddish	Nominated	
Critics' Choice Movie Awards	January 11, 2018	Best Actress in a Comedy	Tiffany Haddish	Nominated	
Detroit Film Critics Society	December 7, 2017	Best Supporting Actress	Tiffany Haddish	Nominated	
Detroit Film Critics Society	December 7, 2017	Best Breakthrough	Tiffany Haddish	Nominated	
Dorian Awards	February 24, 2018	Supporting Film Performance of the Year — Actress	Tiffany Haddish	Nominated	
Empire Awards	March 18, 2018	Best Comedy	Girls Trip	Nominated	
Empire Awards	March 18, 2018	Best Actress	Tiffany Haddish	Nominated	
Guild of Music Supervisors Awards	February 8, 2018	Best Music Supervision for Film: Budgeted Under 25 Million Dollars	Angela Leus	Nominated	
IndieWire Critics Poll	December 19, 2017	Best Supporting Actress	Tiffany Haddish	2nd Place	
MTV Movie & TV Awards	June 18, 2018	Best Movie (Presented by Toyota)	Girls Trip	Nominated	
MTV Movie & TV Awards	June 18, 2018	Best Comedic Performance	Tiffany Haddish	Won	
MTV Movie & TV Awards	June 18, 2018	Scene Stealer	Tiffany Haddish	Nominated	
MTV Movie & TV Awards	June 18, 2018	Best Musical Moment	Dance Battle	Nominated	
NAACP Image Awards	January 15, 2018	Outstanding Motion Picture	Girls Trip	Won	
NAACP Image Awards	January 15, 2018	Outstanding Supporting Actress in a Motion Picture	Tiffany Haddish	Won	
NAACP Image Awards	January 15, 2018	Outstanding Supporting Actress in a Motion Picture	Regina Hall	Nominated	
NAACP Image Awards	January 15, 2018	Outstanding Directing in a Motion Picture	Malcolm D. Lee	Nominated	
NAACP Image Awards	January 15, 2018	Outstanding Writing in a Motion Picture	Kenya Barris and Tracy Oliver	Nominated	
New York Film Critics Circle	January 3, 2018	Best Supporting Actress	Tiffany Haddish	Won	
Online Film Critics Society	December 28, 2017	Best Supporting Actress	Tiffany Haddish	Nominated	
Online Film Critics Society	December 28, 2017	Best Breakout Star	Tiffany Haddish	Nominated	
Seattle Film Critics Society	December 18, 2017	Best Supporting Actress	Tiffany Haddish	Nominated	
Washington D.C. Area Film Critics Association	December 8, 2017	Best Supporting Actress	Tiffany Haddish	Nominated	
Women Film Critics Circle	December 17, 2017	Best Comedic Actress	Tiffany Haddish	Nominated	
Women Film Critics Circle	December 17, 2017	Josephine Baker Award	Girls Trip	Nominated	
Women Film Critics Circle	December 17, 2017	Women's Work: Best Ensemble	The cast of Girls Trip	Won	

== Sequel ==
In January 2019, Pinkett-Smith discussed a potential sequel to Girls Trip, stating "I'm ready for more Flossy Posse, trust me. I'm ready to have some fun with my girls!", and giving Rio de Janeiro or South Africa as potential locations for the film. In April 2019 Latifah said that a sequel was "definitely happening."

In March 2020, Haddish confirmed Tracy Oliver had a treatment "ready to go", and would begin working on the script. Haddish added "We might decide not to even make it Girls Trip, maybe we'll do a different story just in case no one wants to make Girls Trip 2". In January 2023, Oliver said that the sequel was "officially happening", and confirmed that the main cast would be returning. She also named the AfroFuture festival in Accra, Ghana as a possible setting, pending the finalization of the script.

In January 2024, in an interview with The Hollywood Reporter, Packer confirmed that a sequel to the film was in active development, with D. Lee returning to direct and co-produce.

== See also ==
- List of Black films of the 2010s
- Rough Night, another road trip comedy film from 2017 with a predominantly female cast.
