= Sharon Warren =

American actress

- Born: Opelika, Alabama
- Occupation: Actress
- Notable work: Ray (2004) − Aretha Robinson
- Parent: Pebblin Warren (mother)

Sharon Warren is a retired American actress. She played Ray Charles' mother, Aretha Robinson, in the 2004 film Ray.

== Biography ==
Warren was born in Opelika, Alabama. She is the daughter of David, a sheriff for Macon County, Alabama, and Pebblin Warren, a Democratic politician. She went to Auburn University, majoring in finance and business, but dropped out in 1999 to pursue an acting career.

She portrayed Beneatha in a 1999 rendition of A Raisin in the Sun, and acted in Flying Over Purgatory alongside Ruby Dee. While acting on stage, Warren worked for an architectural firm to make ends meet. She worked with Atlanta theater company Alliance Theatre for many years before appearing in Ray.

Warren landed the role of Aretha Robinson, the mother of Ray Charles, in biopic Ray. The film's director, Taylor Hackford, had witnessed Warren acting in a stage production and had her audition for the role. She won the part, being the only actress considered.

The above account of how Warren landed the role is expanded upon and partially contradicted by both the director Taylor Hackford and Warren herself in a bonus documentary featurette 'The Filmmaker's Journey' included in the deluxe 2-DVD edition of Ray. According to Warren, she was tipped by the hotel sales manager to go up to the 2nd floor where the auditions were being held. When she gave her name, she was told she wasn't on the list of appointments, and when admitting not having an agent or being a member of SAG was told she could not be there, as it was a SAG-only audition. However, she was told "We like your nerve." Hackford said that into the office came a woman who had a picture of herself and a non-professional resume, and said to give her a break, and let her read. Hackford: "We turned the camera on, and this Force came out!...We never read another actress for this role."

Warren stated she used her grandmother as a basis while in character as Aretha. Warren stepped away from the spotlight and lives a quiet, private life outside of mainstream Hollywood.

She received an NAACP Image Award nomination for Outstanding Supporting Actress in a Motion Picture for her work in the film. Warren later had a supporting role in the drama film Glory Road (2006).

== Filmography ==
| Year | Title | Role | Notes |
|---|---|---|---|
| 2003 | Amora: The Inquisition | Amora | |
| 2004 | Ray | Aretha Robinson | Black Reel Award for Outstanding Supporting Actress; Black Reel Award for Outstanding Breakthrough Performance, Female; Boston Society of Film Critics Award for Best Supporting Actress; Nominated – NAACP Image Award for Outstanding Supporting Actress in a Motion Picture; Nomination — Satellite Award for Best Supporting Actress – Motion Picture; Nomination — Online Film Critics Society Award for Best Supporting Actress; Nomination — Gold Derby Award for Breakthrough Performance |
| 2006 | Glory Road | Jolene | |
