= Mickey O'Hagan =

American actress

- Born: Michael Adrienne O'Hagan; New York City, U.S.
- Education: Pace University
- Occupation: Actress
- Years active: 2010–present

Mickey O'Hagan is an American film, television, and voice over actress, known for the Showtime series Homeland and the feature film Tangerine.

== Early life and education ==
O'Hagan was born in New York City as Michael Adrienne O'Hagan, named after her father. Mickey was a childhood nickname she eventually used for her professional name. O'Hagan received her B.F.A. in Acting from Pace University, NYC.

== Career ==
O'Hagan began her career with radio and television voice overs, most notably the narrator of the ID Channel's series Stolen Voices, Buried Secrets. Her first television role was on the MTV series Warren The Ape.

Director Sean Baker has given O'Hagan roles in three of his films including the award-winning Starlet. O'Hagan re-teamed with Sean Baker and Chris Bergoch for her breakthrough role in Tangerine, playing Dinah, a hapless prostitute for which she achieved positive critical notices for her performance. In 2024, she had a role in another Baker film Anora.

On the Showtime series Homeland she had a recurring role as Clarice. In 2018 she starred as Margaret in the film Back At The Staircase which premiered at the Slamdance Film Festival. The same year she played Robert Mapplethorpe's assistant in the film Mapplethorpe, directed by Ondi Timoner which premiered at the Tribeca Film Festival. O'Hagan guest starred in the TNT miniseries I Am The Night in January 2019.

== Filmography ==
=== Film ===
Year	Title	Role	Notes
2012	Starlet	Janice	(as Michael O'Hagan)
2012	Dealing	Michael	(as Michael Adrienne O'Hagan)
2014	Test	Manager	
2015	Tangerine	Dinah	
2018	Back at the Staircase	Margaret	
2018	Mapplethorpe	Tina Summerlin	
2018	Destroyer	Gang House Woman	
2024	Anora	Divorce registration officer	

=== Television ===
Year	Title	Role	Notes
2012	Warren The Ape	School Secretary	
2016-2017	Homeland	Clarice	
2019	I Am The Night (episode "Phenomenon of Interference")	Wendy	
2019	Dope Slate	Lish	
