= Knucklehead (2015 film) =

- Directed by: Ben Bowman
- Written by: Bryan Abrams; Ben Bowman
- Produced by: Gbenga Akinnagbe; Ben Bowman; Jonathan Gray
- Starring: Gbenga Akinnagbe; Alfre Woodard; Amari Cheatom
- Cinematography: Soopum Sohn
- Edited by: Katie Ennis
- Music by: Mike Shobe; Benjamin Wright
- Production companies: Hayden5; Imaginary People Productions
- Distributed by: RLJ Entertainment
- Release date: March 26, 2015 (Brooklyn Academy of Music)
- Country: United States
- Language: English

Knucklehead is a 2015 American drama film directed by Ben Bowman. It premiered at the 2015 BAMCinématek New Voices in Black Cinema festival.

== Plot ==
Convinced that prescription drugs can cure his mental disorder, a neighborhood eccentric (Gbenga Akinnagbe) ventures out of Brooklyn's housing projects to escape his controlling mother (Alfre Woodard), and to find the one doctor who he believes can treat him.

== Cast ==
- Gbenga Akinnagbe as Langston
- Alfre Woodard as Sheila
- Amari Cheatom as Julian
- Carla Duren
- Nikiya Mathis
- Justin Myrick
- Lauren Hodges
- DeWanda Wise as Charlotte

== Release ==
The film premiered as the opening night film at the BAMCinématek New Voices in Black Cinema festival at the Brooklyn Academy of Music on March 26, 2015. It was scheduled for release in the U.S. and Canada in late 2016.

== Critical reception ==
Colin Covert gave the film a positive review in Newsweek, writing: "Deftly combining melancholy, tragedy and sly humor, the story is engineered so its gripping drama dovetails neatly with the lead's starry-eyed optimism and the likability of sundry supporting characters. As if juggling chainsaws, Bowman delivers a film that is both troubling and comically upbeat"

Julie Walker, writing for The Root, said "Knucklehead packs an emotional punch," and declared that Gbenga Akinnagbe "owns the movie" in his first leading role as the mentally challenged Langston.

John Defore at The Hollywood Reporter praised the cast, also citing Akinnagbe for his "sympathetic performance" in a film "that will attract attention for a brutal turn by Alfre Woodard as his controlling mother." Justin S. Myrick is called out for his portrayal of Arthur, Langston's young friend with, "a smartass spark that animates scenes and balances the bleak situation at home."

=== Accolades ===
Awards and nominations
Association	Date of ceremony	Venue	Category	Nominee(s)	Result	Ref.
Dances With Films	June 6, 2015	TCL Chinese Theatre	Industry Choice Award	Knucklehead	Won	
American Black Film Festival	June 14, 2015	New York Hilton Midtown	VH-1 Audience Award	Knucklehead	Won	
Minneapolis–Saint Paul International Film Festival	April 24, 2015	Saint Anthony Main	Best Narrative Feature ("MN Made")	Knucklehead	Won	
Baltimore International Black Film Festival	October 11, 2015	Charles Theatre	Best Narrative Feature	Knucklehead	Won	
Baltimore International Black Film Festival	October 11, 2015	Charles Theatre	First Time Feature Director ("Oscar Micheaux Award")	Ben Bowman	Won	
Black Reel Awards	February 20, 2016	Washington, D. C.	Outstanding Independent Feature	Knucklehead	Nominated	
