= 99 Homes =

2014 film

- Theatrical release poster
- Directed by: Ramin Bahrani
- Screenplay by: Ramin Bahrani; Amir Naderi
- Story by: Ramin Bahrani; Bahareh Azimi
- Produced by: Ashok Amritraj; Ramin Bahrani; Kevin Turen; Justin Nappi
- Starring: Andrew Garfield; Michael Shannon; Tim Guinee; Laura Dern
- Cinematography: Bobby Bukowski
- Edited by: Ramin Bahrani
- Music by: Antony Partos; Matteo Zingales
- Production companies: Hyde Park Entertainment; Image Nation; Noruz Films; Treehouse Pictures
- Distributed by: Broad Green Pictures
- Release dates: August 29, 2014 (VIFF); October 9, 2015 (United States)
- Running time: 112 minutes
- Country: United States
- Language: English
- Budget: $8 million
- Box office: $2.1 million

99 Homes is a 2014 American independent drama film directed by Ramin Bahrani, written by Bahrani and Amir Naderi, and starring Andrew Garfield, Michael Shannon, Tim Guinee, and Laura Dern. Set in Florida, during the Great Recession, the film follows single father Dennis Nash (Garfield) and his family as they are evicted from their home by businessman Rick Carver (Shannon), leading to Nash choosing to help Carver in evicting people out of their homes in exchange for his family's home. Bahrani dedicated the film to the late film critic Roger Ebert.

The film competed for the Golden Lion at the 71st Venice International Film Festival. It won Grand Prix at 2015 Deauville American Film Festival. It also screened in the Special Presentations section of the 2014 Toronto International Film Festival. The film was released in a limited release on September 25, 2015, and wide expansion starting October 9, by Broad Green Pictures.

== Plot ==
Recently unemployed single father Dennis Nash, a former construction worker in Orlando, Florida, is evicted together with his mother Lynn, and young son Connor from the foreclosed home they share. Real estate operator Rick Carver is in charge of the eviction. Dennis and his family move into a cramped motel room. Dennis goes to Rick's office and tries to take back his tools stolen by Rick's men. Rick is impressed by Dennis' gumption and offers him work as a repairman. Dennis soon becomes Rick's assistant, helping carry out evictions himself and learning the real estate schemes that exploit government and banking rules to the disadvantage of struggling homeowners.

It is revealed that Rick and Dennis have similar backgrounds and having seen how his father worked hard for no reward and how stacked the system is against the common man, Rick reasons it is better to be the hunter rather than the hunted. With his earnings, Dennis dips into the glamorous lifestyle in which Rick indulges. On his rounds, he encounters the father of his son's best friend, but the man turns hostile when he sees Dennis has become part of Rick's eviction business. He says the eviction is illegal and will fight it in court.

Dennis tells Rick to keep the checks Rick offers as payment so that he can buy back the house from which he was evicted. Rick warns him not to get sentimental about real estate and tells him to keep his money. However, they make a deal to buy back his family's old house, but the legal process prevents them from moving in immediately. Nonetheless, he surprises his mother and son, showing them the house and telling them they will move back in.

Meanwhile, an evicted homeowner, who starts living in the same motel as Dennis and his family, recognizes and threatens him. Dennis denies knowing the man, but Lynn and his son become suspicious of how he is making money. Having witnessed the malicious calls Rick often gets, Dennis decides to move out of the motel immediately by selling the family home and buying a more luxurious home instead.

Lynn is shocked by the loss of their long-time home and repelled as she realizes Dennis got his newfound wealth by helping Rick victimize vulnerable homeowners who have financial problems. She leaves with Connor to stay with her brother.

Rick puts together a multimillion-dollar real estate deal, but it is jeopardized by a legal case brought by a homeowner he is trying to evict. The deal is set to collapse if the homeowner wins as he asserts there is not a full set of documents to evict him. Rick forges a missing document and entrusts Dennis to deliver it to the court, which puts him in a moral dilemma. Dennis delivers the missing document, defeating the homeowner's legal case.

The subsequent eviction turns into an armed stand-off. Fearing that the man, whose family is in the house, will be killed in a shoot-out, Dennis confesses to giving a forged document to the court. The homeowner surrenders, and Dennis is escorted to the law enforcement's car so they can speak with Rick. As Dennis waits in the car, the homeowner's son smiles at him.

== Cast ==
- Andrew Garfield as Dennis Nash
- Michael Shannon as Rick Carver
- Laura Dern as Lynn Nash
- Tim Guinee as Frank Greene
- Noah Lomax as Connor Nash
- Clancy Brown as Mr. Freeman
- Cynthia Santiago as Mrs. Greene
- J.D. Evermore as Mr. Tanner
- Manu Narayan as Khanna
- Cullen Moss as Bill
- Nadiyah Skyy as Tamika

== Production ==
=== Casting ===
On July 24, 2013, Andrew Garfield signed on to play Dennis Nash, an unemployed contractor who loses his home to foreclosure. Later on September 13, Michael Shannon joined the cast of the film to play Rick Carver, who teaches Dennis the legal and illegal ins-and-outs of the foreclosure game. On December 10, Laura Dern also joined the cast of the film to play Lynn Nash, Dennis’ widowed mother, and on January 6, 2014, Noah Lomax joined the cast of the film to play Connor Nash, Dennis' son.

=== Filming ===
Principal photography, which began on November 18, 2013, in New Orleans, took a holiday break from Christmas to New Year on December 20. Later, the film resumed shooting on January 6, 2014. Whenever a close-up of Andrew Garfield's face is needed, Ramin Bahrani used a 24mm wide angle lens to emulate the thoughts of Garfield's character.

=== Music ===
The film's score was written by Antony Partos and Matteo Zingales.

== Release ==
The film had its world premiere at the Venice Film Festival on August 29, 2014. and went on to screen at the Telluride Film Festival on August 30, 2014. As well as the Toronto International Film Festival on September 8, 2014. Shortly after, Broad Green Pictures acquired U.S distribution rights to the film. It went on to screen at the Sundance Film Festival on January 23, 2015. The film was released in a limited release on September 25, 2015. The film was released in the United Kingdom on September 25, 2015.

== Reception ==
=== Critical response ===
On the review aggregator website Rotten Tomatoes, 92% of 159 critics' reviews are positive, with an average rating of 7.5/10. The website's consensus reads: "Fueled by powerful acting and a taut, patiently constructed narrative, 99 Homes is a modern economic parable whose righteous fury is matched by its intelligence and compassion." Metacritic, which uses a weighted average, assigned the film a score of 76 out of 100, based on 31 critics, indicating "generally favorable" reviews.

Richard Roeper of the Chicago Sun-Times called it "A provocative, visceral, sometimes heartbreakingly relevant drama/thriller." Guy Lodge of Variety magazine wrote: "This dynamically acted, unapologetically contrived pic reps the filmmaker's best chance to date of connecting with a wider audience—one likely to share the helmer’s bristling anger over corruptly maintained class divides in modern-day America."

=== Accolades ===
Award	Category	Recipient(s)	Result	Ref.
Golden Globe Awards	Best Supporting Actor – Motion Picture	Michael Shannon	Nominated	
Screen Actors Guild Awards	Outstanding Performance by a Male Actor in a Supporting Role	Michael Shannon	Nominated	
Chlotrudis Society for Independent Films	Best Supporting Actor	Michael Shannon	Won	
Critics' Choice Awards	Best Supporting Actor	Michael Shannon	Nominated	
Independent Spirit Awards	Best Supporting Male	Michael Shannon	Nominated	
Los Angeles Film Critics Association	Best Supporting Actor	Michael Shannon	Won	
Phoenix Film Critics Society	Best Supporting Actor	Michael Shannon	Nominated	
San Francisco Film Critics Circle	Best Supporting Actor	Michael Shannon	Won	
Saturn Awards	Best Supporting Actor	Michael Shannon	Nominated	
Saturn Awards	Best Independent Film		Nominated	
Venice International Film Festival	Golden Lion	Ramin Bahrani	Nominated	
Venice International Film Festival	SIGNIS Award Honorable Mention	Ramin Bahrani	Won	
Venice International Film Festival	Vittorio Veneto Film Festival Award for Best Film	Ramin Bahrani	Won	
