= Chanel Iman =

American model (born 1990)

Chanel Iman Godchaux
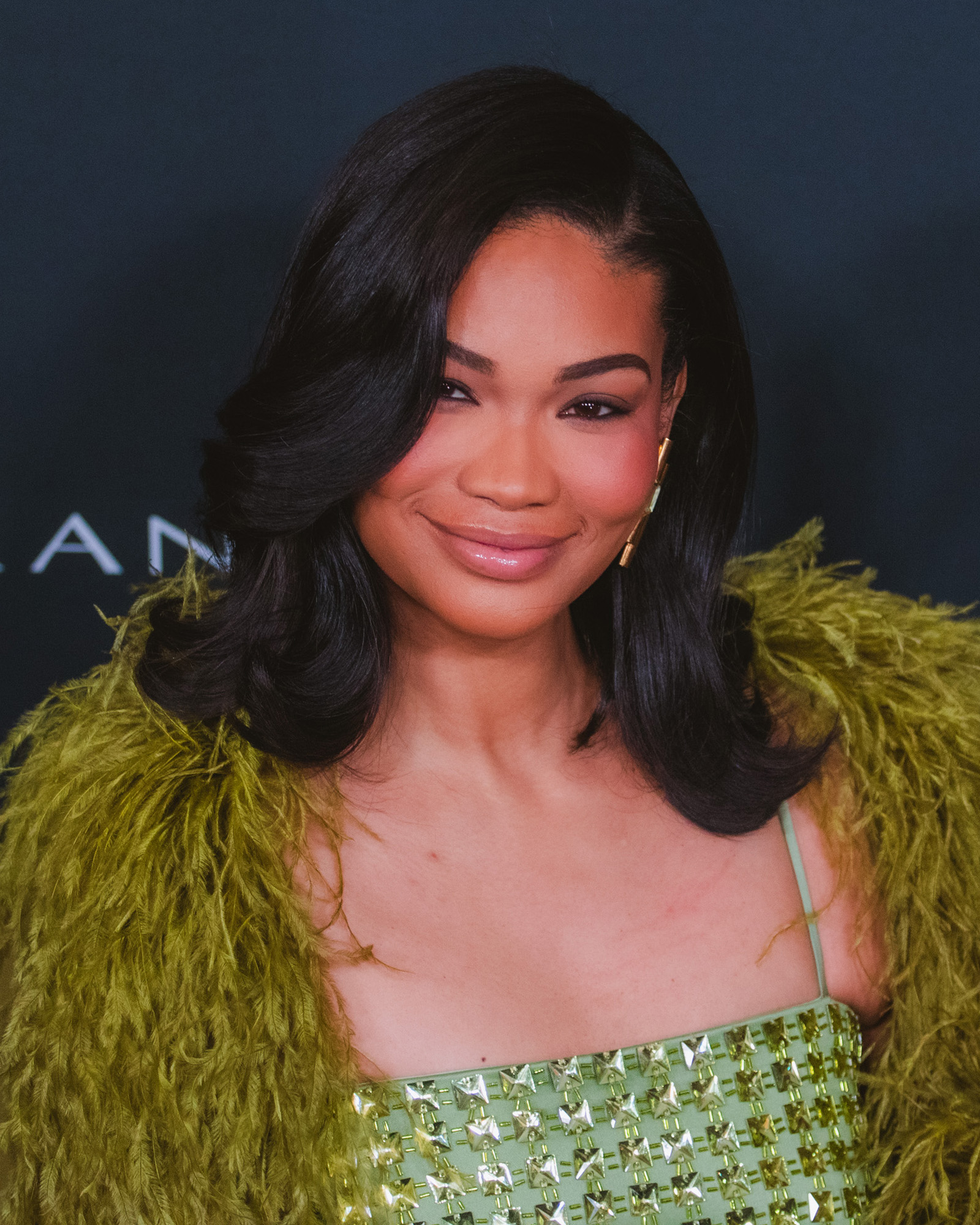
- Iman in 2026
- Born: Chanel Iman Robinson; December 1, 1990 (age 35); Atlanta, Georgia, U.S.
- Occupations: Model; actress
- Years active: 2002–present
- Spouses: Sterling Shepard (m. 2018; div. 2023) Davon Godchaux (m. 2024)
- Partner(s): ASAP Rocky (2013–2014)
- Children: 3
- Modeling information
- Height: 5 ft 10 in (1.78 m)
- Hair color: Black
- Eye color: Brown
- Agency: IMG Models (New York, Paris, London, Los Angeles, Sydney); d'management group (Milan); UNIQUE DENMARK (Copenhagen); Visage Management (Zurich)

Chanel Iman Godchaux (formerly Shepard; née Robinson; born December 1, 1990) is an American model who has worked as a Victoria's Secret Angel. Vogue Paris declared her as one of the top 30 models of the 2000s.

== Early life ==
Iman was born in Atlanta, Georgia, in 1990. She grew up in Los Angeles, California. She is African American with one quarter Korean lineage from her mother.

== Career ==
=== Modeling ===
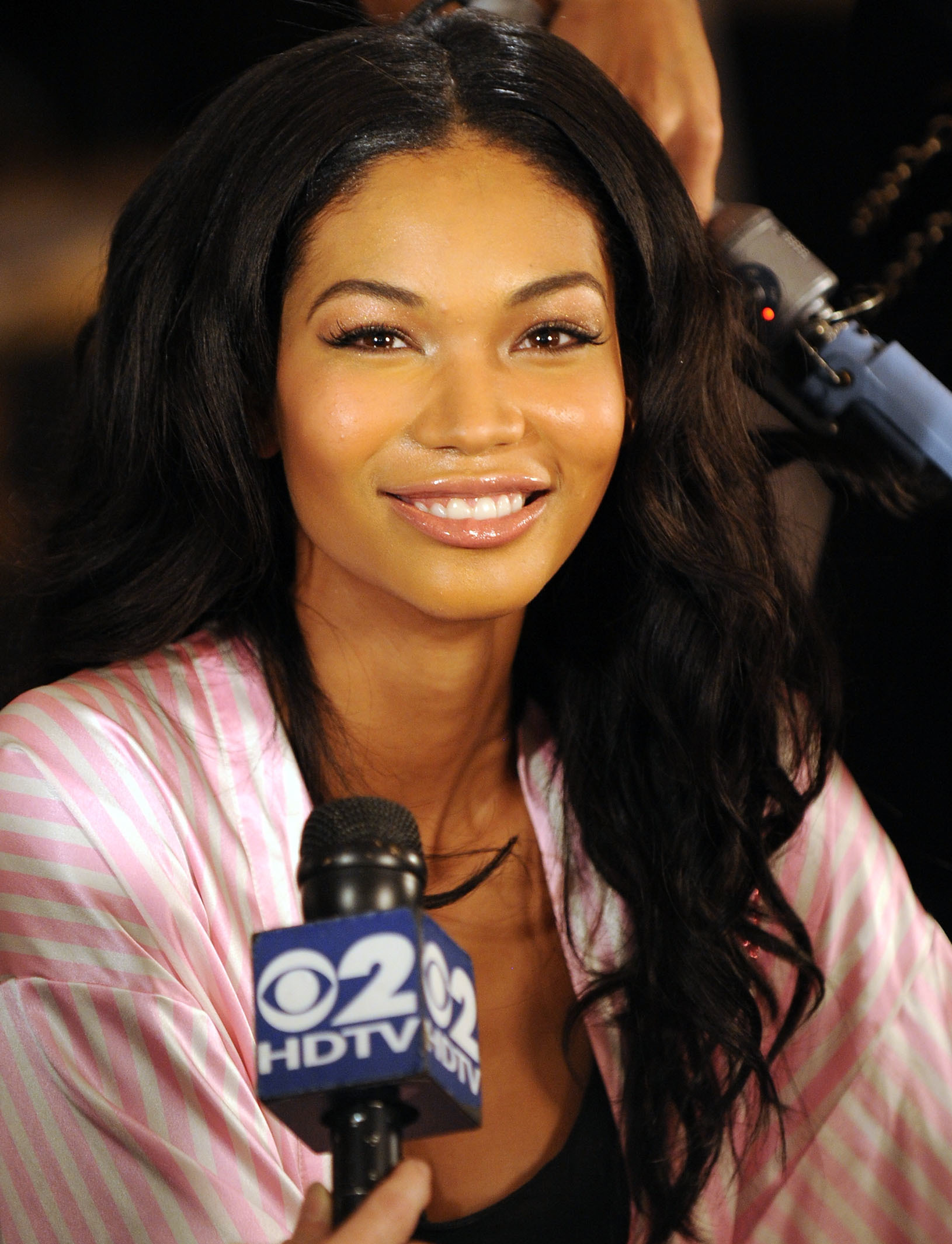
Iman at the 2009 Victoria's Secret fashion show

Iman started modeling with Ford Models at the age of 12 as a child model in Los Angeles, California. She flew to New York in 2006 and won third place in Ford's Supermodel of the World contest. Shortly after, she signed on with the agency. She has appeared in editions for Allure, Dubai, American, and Ukrainian Harpers Bazaar, V, i-D, Pop, Italian, British, and Indonesian Elle, Italian Vanity Fair, and several international Vogues. In February and July 2007, Iman appeared on the cover of Teen Vogue, with Karlie Kloss and Ali Michael, photographed by Patrick Demarchelier, then in November 2009 she appeared on the cover again, this time with Jourdan Dunn. Iman's other covers include American, British, and Italian Elle, American and French L'Officiel, i-D, Dubai and Ukrainian Harper's Bazaar, Lula, Korean, Teen, and American Vogue.

She has walked the runways for Burberry, Tom Ford, Gucci, Versace, Balenciaga, Max Mara Yves Saint Laurent, Oscar de la Renta, Stella McCartney, DKNY, Moschino, Tommy Hilfiger, Jason Wu, Dior, Michael Kors, Hugo Boss, Ralph Lauren, Dolce & Gabbana, Kenzo, Hermés, Louis Vuitton, Alexander McQueen, Roberto Cavalli, Marc Jacobs, DSquared2, John Galliano, and Bottega Veneta.

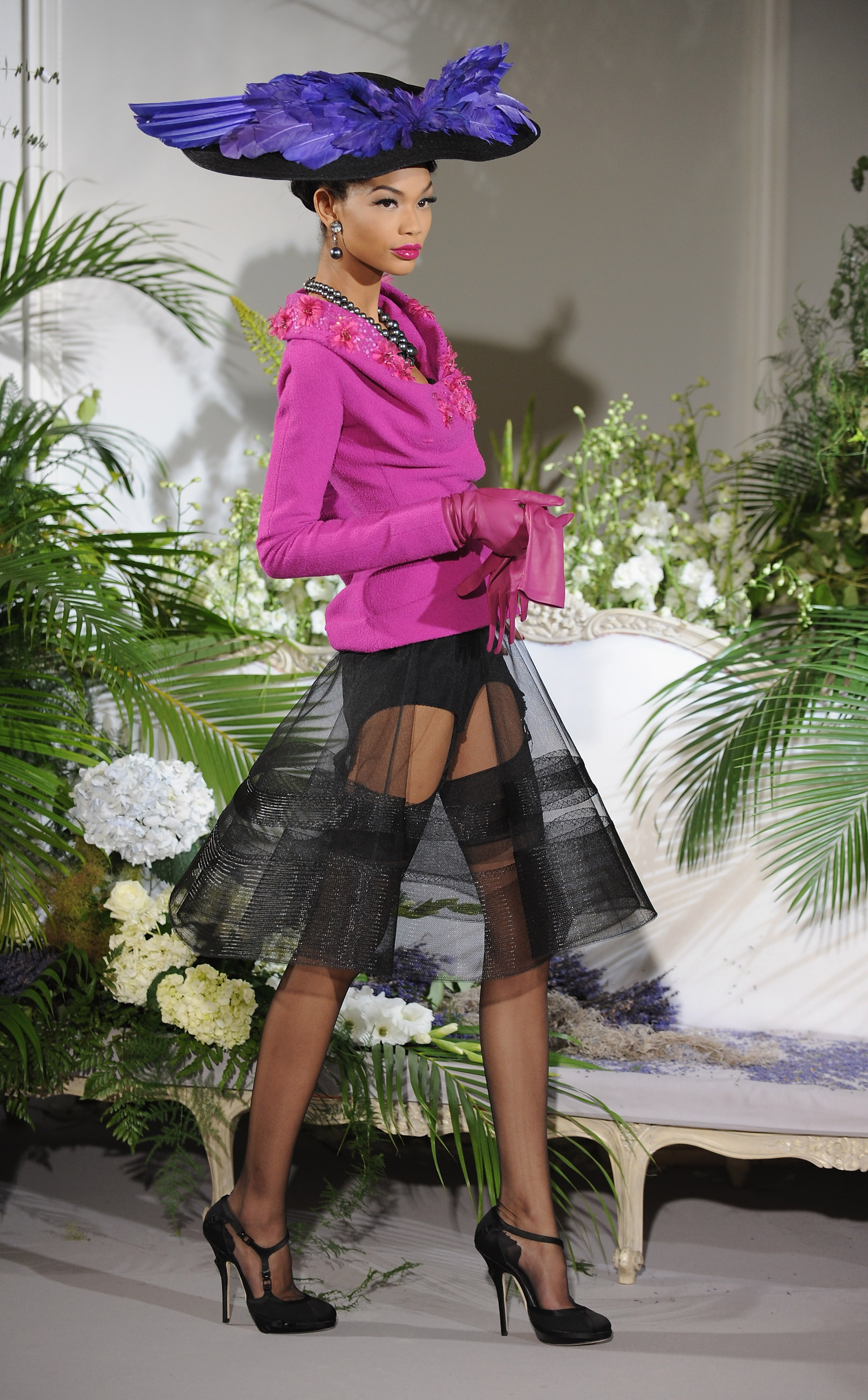
Iman walking for Dior in July 2009

She has appeared in advertising campaigns for Jean Paul Gaultier, Dolce & Gabbana, Ralph Lauren, DKNY, Bottega Veneta, DSquared2, Dennis Basso, Swarovski, XOXO, Benetton, J. Crew, Barneys New York, Saks Fifth Avenue, Lord & Taylor, GAP, Express, Mizani, and Victoria's Secret.

She has walked in the 2009, 2010, and 2011 Victoria's Secret Fashion Shows. In 2010, she became a Victoria's Secret Angel and was used in several of the company's campaigns.

=== Television ===
In October 2007, Iman appeared with her mother on an episode of the Tyra Banks Show. On March 21, 2009, she appeared as a correspondent in MTV's brief revival of House of Style with Bar Refaeli. On September 9, 2009, Iman appeared as a guest judge on the two-hour season premiere of America's Next Top Model, Cycle 13 and also appeared on an episode of America's Next Top Model, Cycle 23 posing with the contestants of that cycle.

She also made an appearance on a January 2016 episode of Spike's Lip Sync Battle, as part of Olivia Munn's performance of Taylor Swift's "Bad Blood".

=== Acting ===
Iman appeared in the 2015 film Dope which premiered at the 2015 Sundance Film Festival. In 2017, Iman appeared in the Crackle original movie, Mad Families.

== Other projects ==
=== Ventures ===
Early in 2010, Iman opened a clothing boutique in Culver City, California called The Red Bag with the help of her mother. Iman appeared in Beyoncé's music video for "Yoncé". She also appeared in singer Usher's music video for "Dive" and The Weeknd's music video for "Can't Feel My Face". In 2012, she attended the Met Ball with fashion designer Tom Ford.

Intel released a Kinect video game on Xbox Live Arcade starring Chanel Iman, Chris Evans and Redfoo of LMFAO. Iman signed a contract with Utah-based electronics company Skullcandy. For 2012, Iman was Sunglass Hut's summer ambassador along with Jourdan Dunn and Joan Smalls. Iman was a model for Amazon Fashion's 2012 holiday campaign. In 2015, she appeared in Rick Famuyiwa’s Dope.

In 2025, Iman launched her brand Chasa, a mindfully designed home, baby and lifestyle collection. In 2026, she announced the Godchaux Ranch with her husband, Davon Godchaux in Grandview, Texas.

== Philanthropy ==
In 2011, Iman traveled to East Africa on a work trip where she became one of a handful of celebrities attached to USAID and Ad Council's FWD campaign, an awareness initiative tied to that year's drought in East Africa. She joined Uma Thurman, Geena Davis and Josh Hartnett in TV and internet ads to "forward the facts" about the crisis. As an advocate for education, Chanel assists with setting up primary schools in impoverished rural areas in Tanzania and Uganda. Her passion for charity work led her to sponsor several young girls in Kenya as well, in which she contributes funds for their daily necessities and academic tuition.

In May 2011, editor-in-chief of American Vogue, Anna Wintour, chose Iman to co-host her Runway to Win fundraising event in Chicago. In conjunction with the event, Iman designed a backpack to raise money for President Barack Obama's 2012 campaign.

== Personal life ==
In early 2013, Iman began dating rapper A$AP Rocky. In April 2014, they were reported to be engaged; however, they separated in June 2014. In August 2015, it was confirmed that Iman was dating Lakers basketball player Jordan Clarkson, although they ended the relationship shortly after.

On December 2, 2017, Iman announced her engagement to New York Giants wide receiver Sterling Shepard. They were married at the Beverly Hills Hotel on March 3, 2018, and have two daughters. The pair announced they were getting divorced in January 2022, with the divorce finalized in April 2023.

In 2022, Iman began dating Davon Godchaux, an American football defensive tackle for the New England Patriots of the National Football League (NFL). The couple announced they were engaged on May 30, 2023. Iman gave birth to their daughter on September 19, 2023. The couple married in early 2024.
