= Mya Taylor =

American actress and singer (born 1991)

- Born: March 28, 1991 (age 35); Houston, Texas, U.S.
- Occupation: Actress
- Years active: 2015–present

Mya Taylor (born March 28, 1991) is an American actress and singer. She is best known for her role as Alexandra in the 2015 film Tangerine, for which she won the Independent Spirit Award for Best Supporting Female.

== Early life ==
Mya Taylor was born on March 28, 1991, in Houston, Texas. She was raised by her Christian grandparents, who at first did not know that she had come out as gay (pre-transition) in school. In 2009, she came out to them, which led to tension in the home. Taylor left and moved to California in May 2009 to live with another relative, but her gender identity led that relative to turn her out of the home.

Unable to secure legal employment at the age of 18, she worked as a sex worker in Hollywood. She began going to therapy, and it was in her talks with her therapist that she decided that she was going to be true to herself. In January 2013, she came out as transgender. She has since reconnected with her mother, who coined her name, Mya. She lived in an apartment with her eventual Tangerine co-star Kitana Kiki Rodriguez. It was at the age of 23, after five years of sex work and after four arrests for prostitution, Mya was approached by director Sean Baker and his co-screenwriter Chris Bergoch as she stood in the yard of Los Angeles' LGBT Center to star in their film Tangerine.

== Career ==
Taylor is best known for her role as Alexandra in Sean Baker's 2015 film Tangerine. The first Academy Award campaigns for openly transgender actresses supported by a film producer were launched for Taylor and Kitana Kiki Rodriguez for the film. Taylor won the Gotham Independent Film Award for Breakthrough Actor for her performance in that film, making her the first openly transgender actress to win a Gotham Award. She also won the San Francisco Film Critics Circle Award for Best Supporting Actress and the Independent Spirit Award for Best Supporting Female for the film. She was the first openly transgender actress to win an Independent Spirit Award.

In 2016 it was announced that ICM Partners signed Taylor and agreed to represent her for film and television acting and producing projects.

Taylor played Marsha P. Johnson in Reina Gosset and Sasha Wortzel's 2016 short film Happy Birthday, Marsha! She is also in the 2016 short film Diane from the Moon.

In December 2017, it was announced Taylor had been cast in Dietland. It began airing on June 4, 2018, on AMC.

== Filmography ==
=== Film ===
Year	Title	Role	Notes
2015	Tangerine	Alexandra	Gotham Independent Film Award for Breakthrough Actor; Independent Spirit Award for Best Supporting Female; San Francisco Film Critics Circle Award for Best Supporting Actress; Seattle Film Critics Award for Best Supporting Actress; Nominated — Black Reel Award for Best Supporting Actress; Nominated — Black Reel Award for Best Breakthrough Performance, Female; 2nd Place — New York Film Critics Circle Award for Best Supporting Actress
2016	Happy Birthday, Marsha!	Marsha P. Johnson	Short film
2016	Diane from the Moon	Diane	Short film
2019	Myra	Joy	
2020	Stage Mother	Cherry	
2024	High Tide	Crystal	

=== Television ===
Year	Title	Role	Notes
2018	Dietland	Barbara	3 episodes
