= Ben Bowman (director) =

American film director and screenwriter

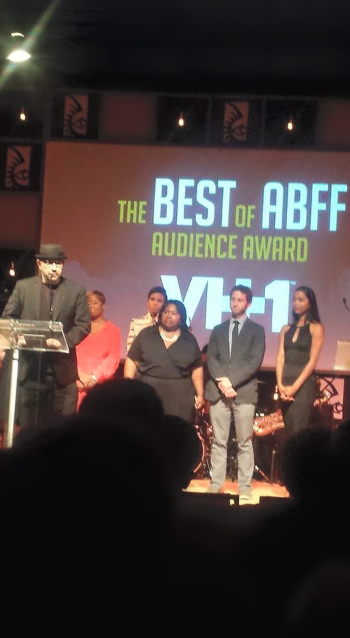
- Ben Bowman accepting the Audience Award at the 2015 American Black Film Festival
- Education: New York University
- Occupations: film director, screenwriter
- Years active: 2001–

Ben Bowman is an American film director and screenwriter originally from Minneapolis, Minnesota.

== Career ==
Bowman's career began in his home town of Minneapolis, editing music video footage for Prince. He later studied directing under Spike Lee at New York University. He subsequently taught at NYU and Trinity College in Connecticut.

Bowman adapted novelist Jonathan Lethem's "The Mad Brooklynite" for the stage. He directed the original production at The 45th Street Theater in New York City.

Bowman's debut as a feature writer and director was the Brooklyn set independent drama Knucklehead. Together with Bryan Abrams, he wrote the screenplay, which went on to draw the attention of Emmy winning and Oscar nominated actor Alfre Woodard. She had received the script from her co-star Gbenga Akinnagbe, who was also a producer on the film. Woodard said that after reading the script, she signed on immediately to work with Bowman, "a young filmmaker with a great idea."

The film premiered as the opening film at the 2015 BAMcinématek New Voices in Black Cinema Festival. It went on to win awards at film festivals across the U.S. and earned positive reviews. The international premiere was at the 4th annual Toronto Black Film Festival. It was distributed by AMC owned RLJ Entertainment, with a release in 2016 on Amazon Prime.

Bowman wrote the feature film screenplay adaptation of New York Times best selling true crime book Skyjack: The Hunt for D. B. Cooper.

Bowman was rumored to be attached to direct a Prince biopic to be produced by Ryan Coogler.

== Filmography ==
Year	Title	Director	Writer	Producer	Notes
2001	New Detroit	Yes	Yes	Yes	co-written with Tom Seltz
2009	High Maintenance (2009)	Yes			
2010	Godfrey: Black by Accident	Yes		Yes	
2016	Knucklehead	Yes	Yes	Yes	feature debut co-written with Bryan Abrams
