= Kitana Kiki Rodriguez =

American transgender actress

- Born: United States
- Occupation: Actress
- Years active: 2015

Kitana Kiki Rodriguez is an American actress. She is best known for her role as Sin-Dee Rella in Sean Baker's 2015 film Tangerine. The first Academy Award campaigns for openly transgender actresses supported by a film producer were launched for Rodriguez and Mya Taylor for Tangerine.

== Life and career ==
Rodriguez, an openly transgender woman, had been sharing an apartment with her eventual Tangerine co-star Mya Taylor at the time that she was discovered by filmmaker Sean Baker at a local Los Angeles LGBT Center. She had no acting experience prior to being cast in the role.

== Filmography ==
=== Film ===
| Year | Title | Role | Notes |
|---|---|---|---|
| 2015 | Tangerine | Sin-Dee Rella | Nominated – Independent Spirit Award for Best Female Lead; Nominated—Gotham Independent Film Award for Breakthrough Actor |

=== Television ===
| Year | Title | Role | Notes |
|---|---|---|---|
| 2015 | Made in Hollywood | Herself | Episode: "10.37" |
