= Dope (2015 film) =

2015 film by Rick Famuyiwa

- Theatrical release poster
- Directed by: Rick Famuyiwa
- Written by: Rick Famuyiwa
- Produced by: Forest Whitaker; Nina Yang Bongiovi
- Starring: Shameik Moore; Tony Revolori; Kiersey Clemons; Kimberly Elise; Chanel Iman; Tyga; Blake Anderson; Zoë Kravitz; ASAP Rocky
- Cinematography: Rachel Morrison
- Edited by: Lee Haugen
- Music by: Germaine Franco
- Production companies: Significant Productions; i am OTHER; Revolt Films
- Distributed by: Open Road Films (North America); Sony Pictures Releasing International; Stage 6 Films (International)
- Release dates: January 24, 2015 (Sundance); June 19, 2015 (United States)
- Running time: 103 minutes
- Country: United States
- Language: English
- Budget: $7 million
- Box office: $18 million

Dope is a 2015 American coming-of-age comedy-drama film written and directed by Rick Famuyiwa and produced by Forest Whitaker and Nina Yang Bongiovi. It stars Shameik Moore, Tony Revolori, Kiersey Clemons, Kimberly Elise, Chanel Iman, Tyga, Blake Anderson, Zoë Kravitz and ASAP Rocky in his film debut. The film was also executive produced by Pharrell Williams and co-executive produced by Sean Combs.

The film premiered at the 2015 Sundance Film Festival on January 24, 2015 in Park City, Utah and was released in North America on June 19 by Open Road Films. It was re-released on September 4 during the Labor Day holiday weekend. The film received positive reviews.

== Plot ==
Malcolm Adekanbi and his best friends, Jib Caldones and Diggy Andrews, are high school "geeks" living in "The Bottoms", a high-crime neighborhood in Inglewood, California. They idolize '90s hip hop music and fashion. Malcolm is confident he will be admitted to his dream school, Harvard University, but his school counselor is skeptical and suggests he take an interview with local businessman and Harvard alumnus, Austin Jacoby.

While biking home, Malcolm is stopped by Dom, a drug dealer who instructs him to invite a girl named Nakia to his party. Malcolm charms Nakia, who tells him she will only accept if Malcolm goes as well. Jib and Diggy accompany Malcolm to the party, where Dom's purchase of high-grade, powdered molly is interrupted by an armed gang, and several people are shot. Malcolm escapes as the police arrive, unaware that Dom has hidden the drugs and a gun in his backpack. Nakia drives Malcolm home, and he offers to help her with her GED.

The next day, Malcolm discovers the drugs, gun, and an iPhone. An unknown caller reveals that he knows Malcolm's identity and instructs him to turn over the drugs. After school, Malcolm prepares to hand over the drugs when he receives a call from Dom, in custody, who tells Malcolm not to give the drugs to the other caller. He texts Malcolm an address and tells him to ask for AJ.

Malcolm, Jib and Diggy flee to the address, chased by the unknown caller, and are greeted by Jaleel and his sister Lily. Since AJ, their father, isn't home, Jaleel invites them inside their mansion and takes Jib and Diggy out for food, while Lily seduces Malcolm, finds the drugs and takes a heavy dose. Intoxicated, Lily passes out while driving Malcolm to his interview before urinating on a bush while bystanders record, and Malcolm drives her car to the meeting himself.

Arriving at Jacoby's office, he notices photos of Dom, Lily, and Jaleel and realizes Jacoby is AJ. Malcolm relays Dom's instructions to Jacoby, who denies any knowledge and implies that the contents of the bag are now Malcolm's responsibility. Jacoby reschedules the interview, warning Malcolm that if he has not sold the drugs by then, he will not receive Jacoby's recommendation to Harvard.

Malcolm, Jib and Diggy seek help from hacker Will Sherwood, who sets up an online black-market website to sell the drugs through Bitcoin transactions, which soon goes viral. The three friends enroll in a Google Science Fair project to access the school lab and computer room, where they can sell the drugs to the various buyers. Even though no one suspects them, they almost get caught one day during a routine police search. This episode frightens Jib who wants to leave, but eventually accepts to go on to finish the sales.

Malcolm helps Nakia study, and she opens up to him, but he accuses her of being sent by Dom and pushes her away. The next day, Malcolm asks Will to extract cash from the Bitcoins, and arranges a meeting with a money-laundering gangster named Fidel. Malcolm leaves the meeting with a bag of cash, but is assaulted by the school bully, who takes the bag. Desperate, Malcolm pulls out the gun, retrieving the money and earning the bully's respect.

Returning to AJ's office, Malcolm tells Jacoby that he has sold the drugs but has left a trail leading to Jacoby – unless Jacoby gets him admitted to Harvard, Malcolm will transfer the Bitcoins to Jacoby's checking account, incriminating Jacoby for the sale and leading to his arrest. Later Malcolm types his college application essay, describing two students – Student A is a music geek who plays in a punk band and gets straight As, while Student B suffers in the hood and makes money in immoral ways. He asks, "Which student do you think I am?"

Malcolm gets a modern haircut and waits for Nakia at prom, but she does not show. Later, Nakia meets Malcolm at his home and thanks him for helping her pass her GED, giving him a pass to Six Flags and they share a kiss. He returns to his room to find a letter from Harvard on his bed. He opens it and looks at the audience before smiling.

== Cast ==
- Shameik Moore as Malcolm Adekanbi
- Tony Revolori as James "Jib" Caldones
- Kiersey Clemons as Cassandra "Diggy" Andrews
- Kimberly Elise as Lisa Hayes
- Chanel Iman as Lily Jacoby
- Blake Anderson as Will Sherwood
- Zoë Kravitz as Nakia
- ASAP Rocky as Dom
- LaKeith Stanfield as Marquis "Bug"
- Rick Fox as Councilman Blackmon
- Amin Joseph as The Voice
- Tyga as De'Andre
- Roger Guenveur Smith as Austin Jacoby
- De'Aundre Bonds as Stacey, the school security guard, reprising his character from The Wood
- Quincy Brown as Jaleel Jacoby
- Kap G as Micheal Fidel
- Vince Staples as a member of Dom's Crew
- Casey Veggies as rapper
- Wyking Jones as Proctor
- Forest Whitaker as the Narrator

== Soundtrack ==
Dope (Music From The Motion Picture)

Soundtrack album by Various
- Released: June 16, 2015
- Genre: Film soundtrack
- Labels: i am OTHER; Columbia

The soundtrack to the film, Dope (Music from the Motion Picture), was released by i am OTHER Entertainment and Columbia Records on June 16, 2015.

1. "Rebirth of Slick (Cool Like Dat)" – Digable Planets
2. "Can't Bring Me Down" – Awreeoh
3. "The World is Yours" (feat. Pete Rock) – Nas
4. "Go Ahead" – Awreeoh
5. "Rebel Without a Pause" – Public Enemy
6. "Don't Get Deleted" – Awreeoh
7. "Scenario" (feat. Leaders of the New School) – A Tribe Called Quest
8. "Cocaina Shawty" – Kap G
9. "Poppin Off" – WatchTheDuck
10. "The Humpty Dance" – Digital Underground
11. "New Money" – Buddy
12. "Hip Hop Hooray" – Naughty by Nature
13. "Dirty Feeling" – LolaWolf
14. "Home is Where the Hatred Is" – Gil Scott-Heron
15. "It's My Turn Now" – Awreeoh
16. "Know What I Want"– Kali Uchis

== Release ==
Dope debuted in the U.S. Dramatic Competition category at the 2015 Sundance Film Festival, which started on January 22, 2015 in Park City, Utah. At the festival, the film received offers from at least six production companies and film studios, among whom were The Weinstein Company, A24, Fox Searchlight, Focus Features, Lionsgate and Relativity Media, before its rights were sold to Open Road Films (who distributed the film domestically) and Sony Pictures (who distributed the film internationally) for a reported $7 million plus $20 million for marketing and promotion. It was selected to close the Directors' Fortnight section at the 2015 Cannes Film Festival. It was released in the United States on June 19, 2015. In September 2015, the film competed in the 2015 Deauville American Film Festival where it won the Prix du Public (Audience Award).

== Reception ==
=== Box office ===
Dope grossed $6.1 million in its opening weekend, finishing 5th at the box office behind Jurassic World ($106.6 million), Inside Out ($90.4 million), Spy ($11.2 million) and San Andreas ($8.7 million). At the end of its theatrical run, the film grossed just shy of $18 million worldwide.

=== Critical response ===
Dope received positive reviews from critics. On Rotten Tomatoes, the film holds a rating of 88%, based on 161 reviews, with an average rating of 7.3/10. The website's critical consensus reads, "Featuring a starmaking performance from Shameik Moore and a refreshingly original point of view from writer-director Rick Famuyiwa, Dope is smart, insightful entertainment." On Metacritic, the film has a score of 72 out of 100, based on 37 critics, indicating "generally favorable" reviews. Audiences polled by CinemaScore gave the film an "A−" grade.

The Guardian gave the film five stars out of five, describing the entire cast as "revolutionary". IGN awarded it 7 out of 10, saying "Comedy, romance, drama and crime rub shoulders in entertaining coming-of-age flick."

== See also ==
- List of black films of the 2010s
- List of hood films
