= Tangerine (film) =

2015 American film

- Theatrical release poster
- Directed by: Sean Baker
- Written by: Sean Baker; Harvey Denton; Chris Bergoch
- Produced by: Sean Baker; Karrie Cox; Marcus Cox; Darren Dean; Shih-Ching Tsou
- Starring: Kitana Kiki Rodriguez; Mya Taylor; Karren Karagulian; Mickey O'Hagan; Alla Tumanian; James Ransone
- Cinematography: Sean Baker; Radium Cheung
- Edited by: Sean Baker
- Production companies: Duplass Brothers Productions; Through Films
- Distributed by: Magnolia Pictures
- Release dates: January 23, 2015 (Sundance); July 10, 2015 (United States)
- Running time: 88 minutes
- Country: United States
- Languages: English; Armenian
- Budget: $100,000
- Box office: $935,984

Tangerine is a 2015 American independent comedy-drama film directed, produced, and edited by Sean Baker, who co-wrote the screenplay with Chris Bergoch. It follows a transgender sex worker as she discovers that her boyfriend, who is also her pimp, has been cheating on her. The film stars Kitana Kiki Rodriguez, Mya Taylor, and James Ransone.

Tangerine was shot on three iPhone 5s smartphones. It premiered at the 2015 Sundance Film Festival on January 23 and had a limited release through Magnolia Pictures on July 10. It grossed $935,984 on a budget of $100,000 and received critical acclaim for its screenplay, direction, performances, and portrayal of transgender individuals.

== Plot ==
Transgender sex worker Sin-Dee Rella, who has just finished a 28-day jail sentence, meets her friend Alexandra, another trans sex worker, at a donut shop in Hollywood on Christmas Eve. Alexandra reveals that Sin-Dee's boyfriend and pimp Chester has been cheating on her with another woman. Sin-Dee storms out to search the neighborhood for Chester and the woman.

Alexandra hands out flyers for her musical performance that evening and argues with a client who refuses to pay; their argument is broken up by the police. Razmik, an Armenian cab driver, picks up a prostitute, but ejects her from his cab when he discovers she is not transgender. He meets Alexandra and fellates her in a car wash, then goes home to eat Christmas Eve dinner with his family. Alexandra goes to the bar for her performance, but no customers have arrived.

Sin-Dee finds the woman she is looking for, Dinah, at a brothel in a motel. She hauls her onto a bus to find Chester. Dinah taunts her for believing she is Chester's only girlfriend. Sin-Dee realizes she is late for Alexandra's performance and drags Dinah there instead. She reconciles with Dinah as they smoke crystal meth in the bar bathroom, and Sin-Dee applies Dinah's make-up. Alexandra performs to a mostly empty bar.

Razmik leaves his family to attend Alexandra's performance, saying he has to work, but discovers he is too late and searches for Sin-Dee. Suspicious, his mother-in-law, Ashken, hails another Armenian cab driver, Karo. The driver knows about Razmik's interests, and while initially hesitant, Karo agrees to help her track down Razmik.

Sin-Dee, Alexandra, and Dinah go to the donut shop, where Sin-Dee confronts Chester. He insists Dinah means nothing to him and reveals that he and Sin-Dee are engaged. Razmik arrives to buy sex from Sin-Dee, but he is followed by his mother-in-law. Ashken at first thinks Razmik's secret is that he is smoking marijuana, but Chester explains that he has sex with prostitutes. She calls Razmik's wife, who arrives with their infant daughter. An argument among the eight escalates until the shop owner kicks them out. Razmik's wife is upset, but she tells her mother to mind her own business. He and his family go back to their apartment. Dinah walks back to the brothel but is told there is no room for her.

Outside the donut shop, Chester tells Sin-Dee that he also slept with Alexandra. Hurt, Sin-Dee leaves and tries to pick up some clients; they throw urine in her face and drive away shouting transphobic slurs. Alexandra takes Sin-Dee to a laundromat to clean her clothes and wig, and gives Sin-Dee her wig to wear while they wait.

== Cast ==
- Kitana Kiki Rodriguez as Sin-Dee Rella, a transgender sex worker
- Mya Taylor as Alexandra, a transgender sex worker
- James Ransone as Chester, a drug dealer and pimp
- Mickey O'Hagan as Dinah, a sex worker
- Karren Karagulian as Razmik, an Armenian cab driver
- Richard-Lael Lillard as Miss Willy
- Alla Tumanian as Ashken, Razmik's mother-in-law
- Louisa Nersisyan as Yeva, Razmik's wife
- Arsen Grigoryan as Karo, an Armenian cab driver
- Ian Edwards as Nash
- Scott Krinsky as Parsimonious John
- Clu Gulager as The Cherokee, a fare in Razmik's cab
- Josh Sussman as Retch Chunder
- Ana Foxxx as Selena
- Chelcie Lynn as Madam Jillian
- Jason Stuart as Joey, the doorman
- Katja Kassin as John's prostitute
- Shih-Ching Tsou as Mamasan, the manager of Donut Time
- Julie Cummings as Officer Jules
- Rae L. Siskind as Officer Ray

== Production ==
Mark Duplass offered to fund a micro-budget film by Sean Baker before Baker considered Tangerine. After a two-year festival run for his previous film Starlet, and inspired by the independent films he saw at the New Zealand Film Festival, Baker called Duplass to see if the offer still stood and began working on his next film. Tangerine was executive produced by Duplass and his brother Jay, and produced by Karrie Cox and Marcus Cox with Through Films, as well as Darren Dean and Shih-Ching Tsou.

Baker and Chris Bergoch wrote the screenplay together from September to December 2013. They met transgender actresses Mya Taylor and Kitana Kiki Rodriguez, who had no major acting experience, at the Los Angeles LGBT Center in 2013.

Principal photography began on December 24, 2014, and wrapped on January 18, 2015, taking place in Hollywood locations such as West Hollywood clubs and Santa Monica Boulevard. After viewing iPhone experiments on Vimeo, Baker and cinematographer Radium Cheung shot the film using three iPhone 5s smartphones. The money saved on equipment was used to pay extras and book filming locations. They used FiLMIC Pro (a camera app that allows iPhone users to pull focus, control the aperture and color temperature of a shot, and capture video at higher bit rates, among other features) and an anamorphic lens adapter from Moondog Labs to shoot in a widescreen format, as well as Tiffen's Steadicam Smoothee to ensure smooth camera movements.

Baker was able to get three Moondog Labs anamorphic adapters for free by contacting the company, as the adapters were still in their prototype stage on Kickstarter, and he informed them that he was working with Mark Duplass on the project. He told them it would let the film crew "shoot the way Sergio Leone would shoot westerns".

Baker edited the film himself, using Final Cut Pro for a preliminary cut and DaVinci Resolve for color grading.

== Release ==
Tangerine made its world premiere January 23, 2015, at the Sundance Film Festival as part of their NEXT program. Magnolia Pictures bought world rights to the film on January 27, 2015, and confirmed they planned releasing the film later in 2015. The film went on to screen at the San Francisco International Film Festival on May 6, 2015. the Seattle International Film Festival on June 4, 2015, and the Oak Cliff Film Festival on June 11, 2015. The film had its Australian debut at the Sydney Film Festival on June 12, 2015.

The film then played at the Provincetown International Film Festival on June 17, 2015, and the BAMcinemaFest on June 28, 2015. In the Czech Republic, the film premiered at the Karlovy Vary International Film Festival on July 8, 2015. The film was released in a North American limited release on July 10, 2015. The film was released in the United Kingdom on November 13, 2015, by Metrodome Group.

== Reception ==
Review aggregator Rotten Tomatoes reports that 96% of 160 critics gave the film a positive review, with an average rating of 7.9/10. The site's critics consensus reads: "Tangerine shatters casting conventions and its filmmaking techniques are up-to-the-minute, but it's an old-fashioned comedy at heart—and a pretty wonderful one at that." On Metacritic, it has a weighted average score of 86 out of 100 based on 35 reviews, indicating "universal acclaim".

The Hollywood Reporter described the film as "a singularly delightful girlfriend movie with an attitude". Variety's Justin Chang wrote that Tangerine is "an exuberantly raw and up-close portrait of one of Los Angeles' more distinctive sex-trade subcultures." A. V. Wire's Seth Malvín Romero said: "Tangerine is a stylistic tour-de-force. An original, dazzling, and unforgettable portrayal of betrayal and friendship that easily bests any other film this year." In a positive review, The A.V. Club's Ignatiy Vishnevetsky wrote that "for all of Tangerine's movement [...] and all of its slapping and arguing, it's the movie's quietest, softest moments that register most strongly." He concluded: "Perhaps these moments feel so graceful because they are oases; they matter because of the harsh, unforgiving terrain that has to be crossed in order to reach them. This terrain is drawn garishly, vividly, and with a sense of fun."

=== Awards campaign ===
The first Academy Awards campaigns for openly transgender actresses supported by a film producer were launched for this film, in 2015, for actresses Kitana Kiki Rodriguez and Mya Taylor, though neither was nominated.

=== Accolades ===
- 2015 – Directors to Watch (Sean S. Baker), Palm Springs International Film Festival
- 2015 – Stanley Kubrick Award, Traverse City Film Festival
- 2015 – Prix Nouvelles Vagues au Festival international du film de La Roche-sur-Yon (France)

List of Accolades
Award / Film Festival	Category	Recipient(s)	Result	Ref.
Detroit Film Critics Society	Breakthrough	Sean Baker	Nominated	
Gotham Independent Film Awards	Audience Award	Tangerine	Won	
Gotham Independent Film Awards	Best Feature	Tangerine	Nominated	
Gotham Independent Film Awards	Breakthrough Actor	Kitana Kiki Rodriguez	Nominated	
Gotham Independent Film Awards	Breakthrough Actor	Mya Taylor	Won	
Independent Spirit Awards	Best Feature	Tangerine	Nominated	
Independent Spirit Awards	Best Director	Sean Baker	Nominated	
Independent Spirit Awards	Best Female Lead	Kitana Kiki Rodriguez	Nominated	
Independent Spirit Awards	Best Supporting Female	Mya Taylor	Won	
Karlovy Vary International Film Festival	Forum of Independents Award	Tangerine	Won	
San Francisco Film Critics Circle	Best Original Screenplay	Sean Baker and Chris Bergoch	Nominated	
San Francisco Film Critics Circle	Best Supporting Actress	Mya Taylor	Won	

== See also ==
- List of films shot on mobile phones
- List of lesbian, gay, bisexual or transgender-related films of 2015
