= Ma Shih-yuan =

Taiwanese actress (born 2000)

- 馬士媛
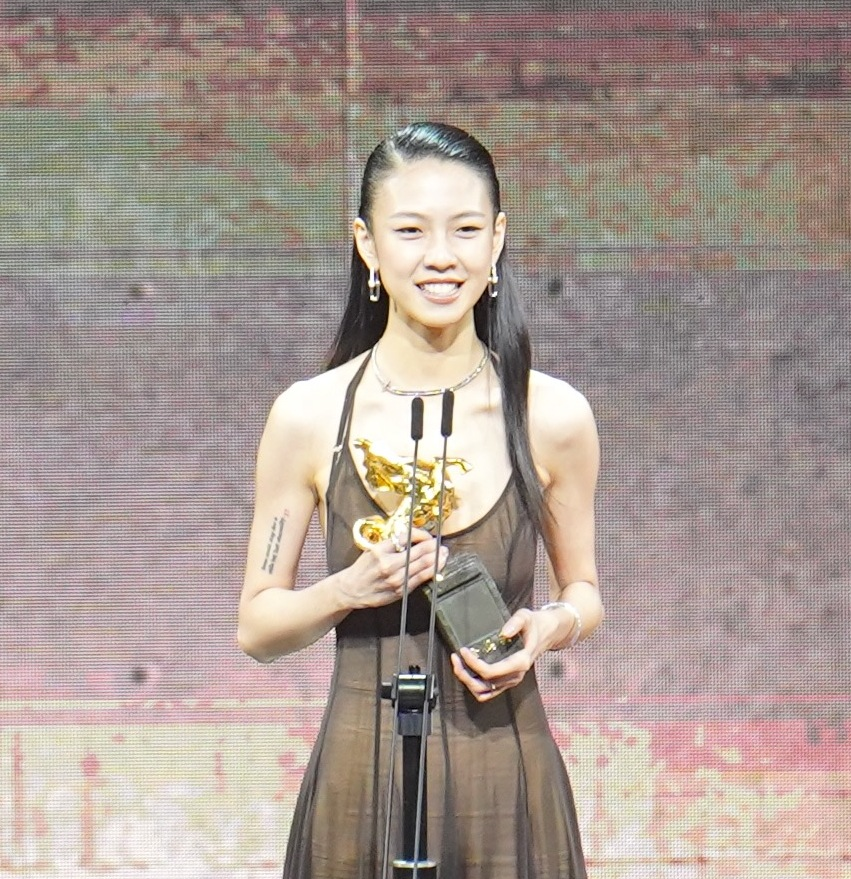
- Ma at the 62nd Golden Horse Awards
- Born: Ma Shih-yuan; 2000 (age 25–26)
- Occupation: Actress
- Agent: ISTAR Ent.

Ma Shih-yuan (Chinese: 馬士媛), also known as Megan Ma, is a Taiwanese actress. Her performance in Left-Handed Girl (2025) earned her Best New Performer at the 62nd Golden Horse Awards.

== Early life ==
Ma Shih-yuan was born in 2000. She developed an interest in acting after portraying a crazy character in Jade's music video "Telephone." She realized that acting allowed her to express herself.

== Career ==
Ma began her acting career by appearing in music videos. She was discovered by film director Shih-Ching Tsou on Instagram, who chose her to star in the film Left-Handed Girl. In the film she portrayed Yi-an, eldest daughter of Janel Tsai's character who works at a betel nut stand at night to support her family. For her performance in this film, Ma received the Best New Performer at the 62nd Golden Horse Awards and the Best Actress award at the Stockholm International Film Festival.

== Filmography ==
=== Film ===
Year	Title	Role	Notes	Ref.
2025	Dead Talents Society		Cameo	
2025	Left-Handed Girl	Yi-an	Lead Role	

=== Television series ===
Year	Title	Role	Network	Notes
2023	At the Moment	Hsueh-li	Netflix	Cameo; Episode 10
2025	Fragrance of the First Flower Season 2	Clothing Store clerk	GagaOOLala , Netflix	Cameo

== Awards and nominations ==
Year	Award	Category	Nominated Work	Result	Ref.
2025	Stockholm International Film Festival	Best Actress	Left-Handed Girl	Won	
2025	62nd Golden Horse Awards	Best New Performer	Left-Handed Girl	Won	
