= Washington D.C. Area Film Critics Association Awards 2025 =

24th Washington D.C. Area Film Critics Association Awards

24th WAFCA Awards
- Date: December 7, 2025

Highlights
- Best Film: Sinners
- Best Director: Ryan Coogler – Sinners
- Best Actor: Michael B. Jordan – Sinners
- Best Actress: Jessie Buckley – Hamnet

The 24th Washington D.C. Area Film Critics Association Awards were announced on December 7, 2025. The nominations were announced on December 6, 2025.

Paul Thomas Anderson's action thriller One Battle After Another and Ryan Coogler's period supernatural horror film Sinners led the nominations with thirteen each, followed by Hamnet with nine and Marty Supreme with eight.

Sinners ultimately dominated with a record-breaking ten wins (the most awards ever earned by a single film in the organization's history), followed by One Battle After Another with three. Additionally, Coogler achieved a rare sweep of Best Film, Best Director, and Best Original Screenplay.

== Winners and nominees ==
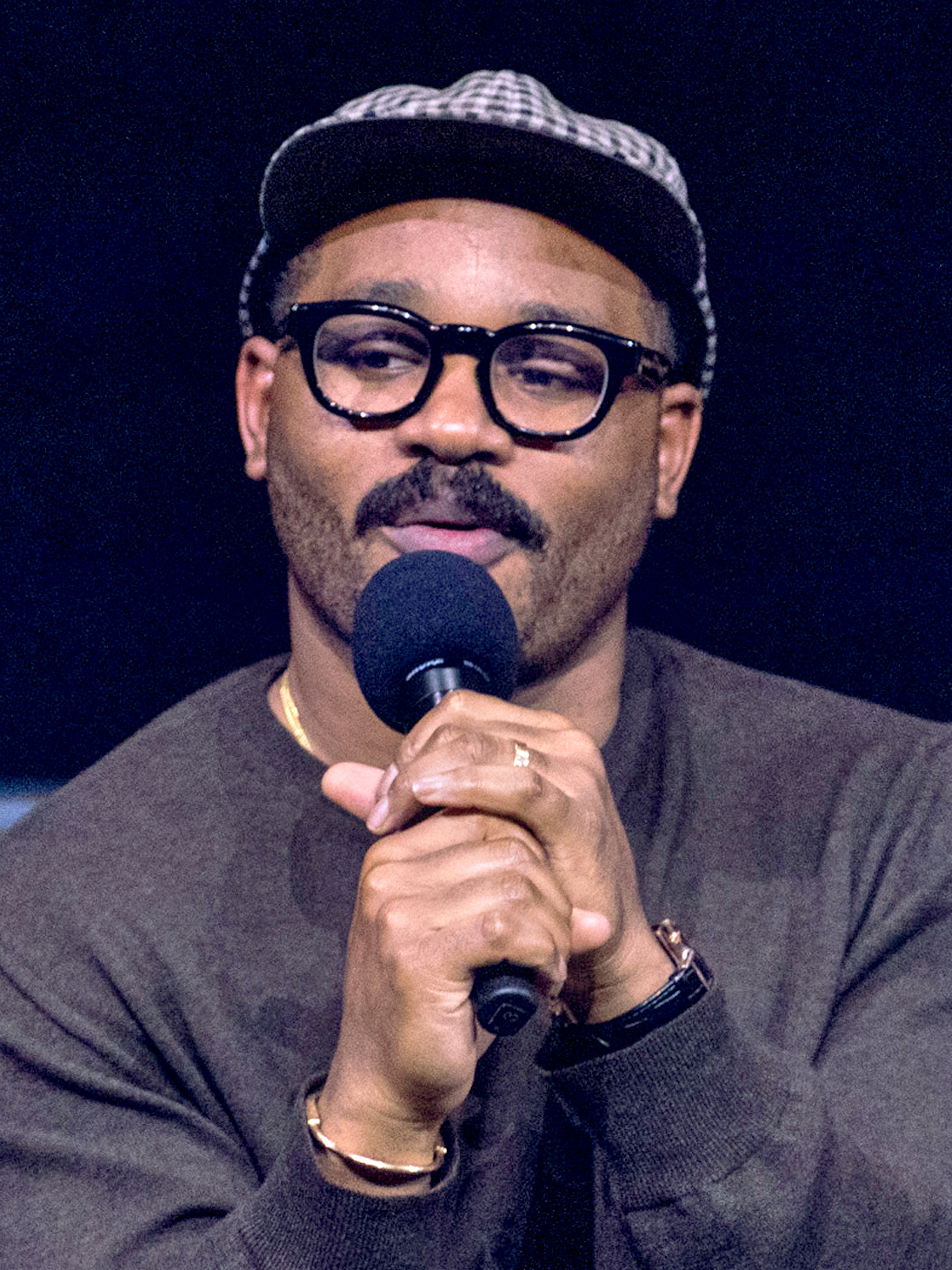
Ryan Coogler, Best Director and Best Original Screenplay winner

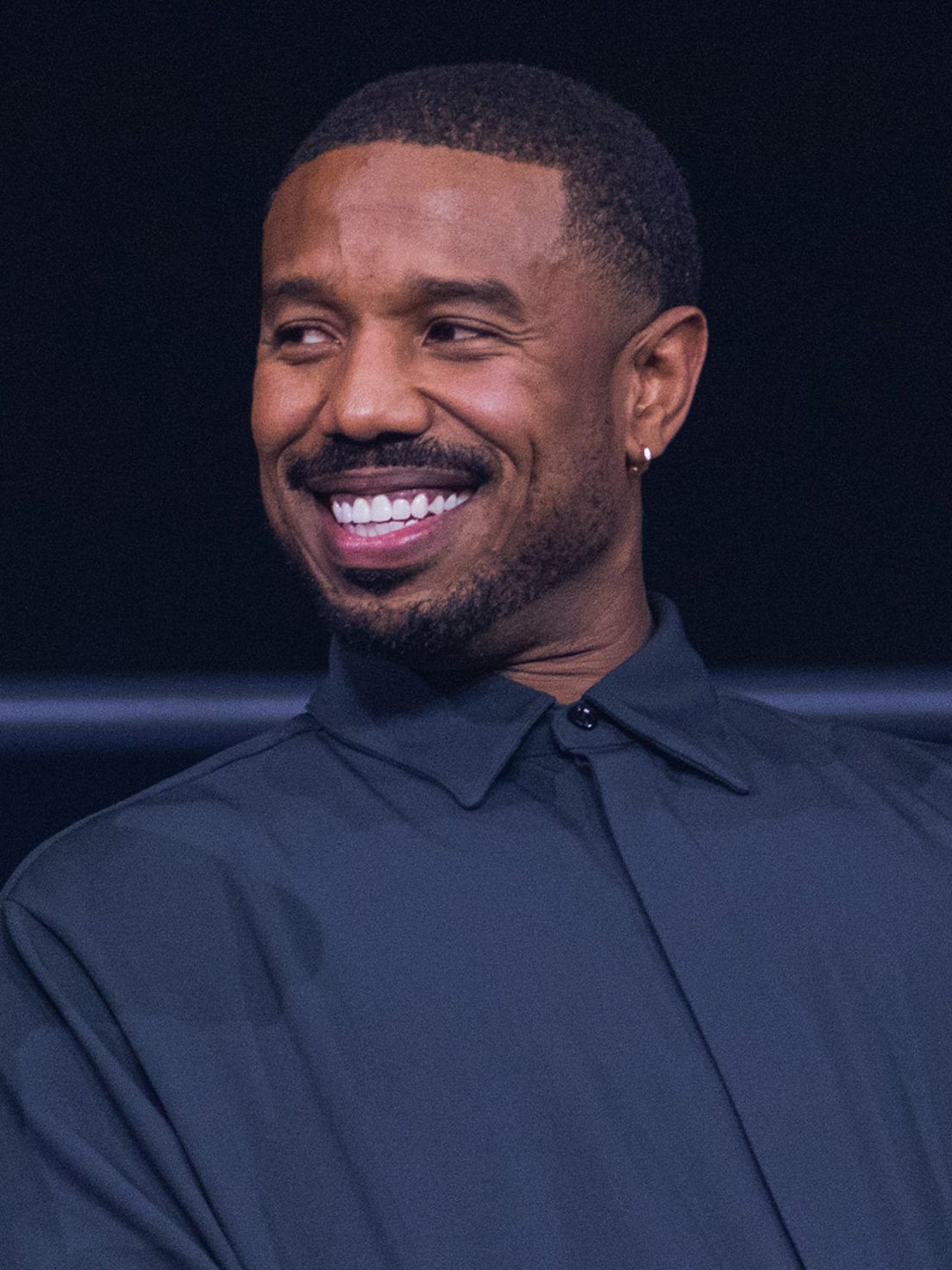
Michael B. Jordan, Best Actor winner

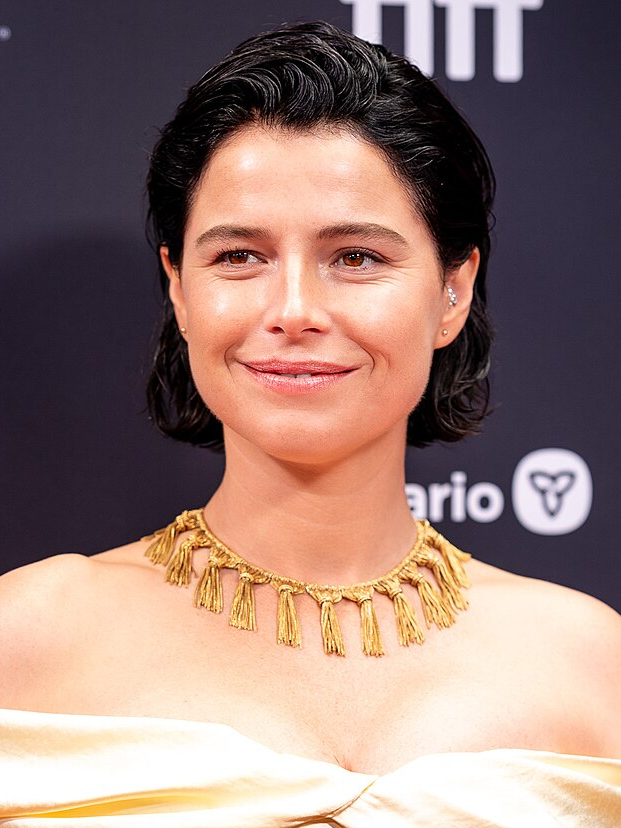
Jessie Buckley, Best Actress winner

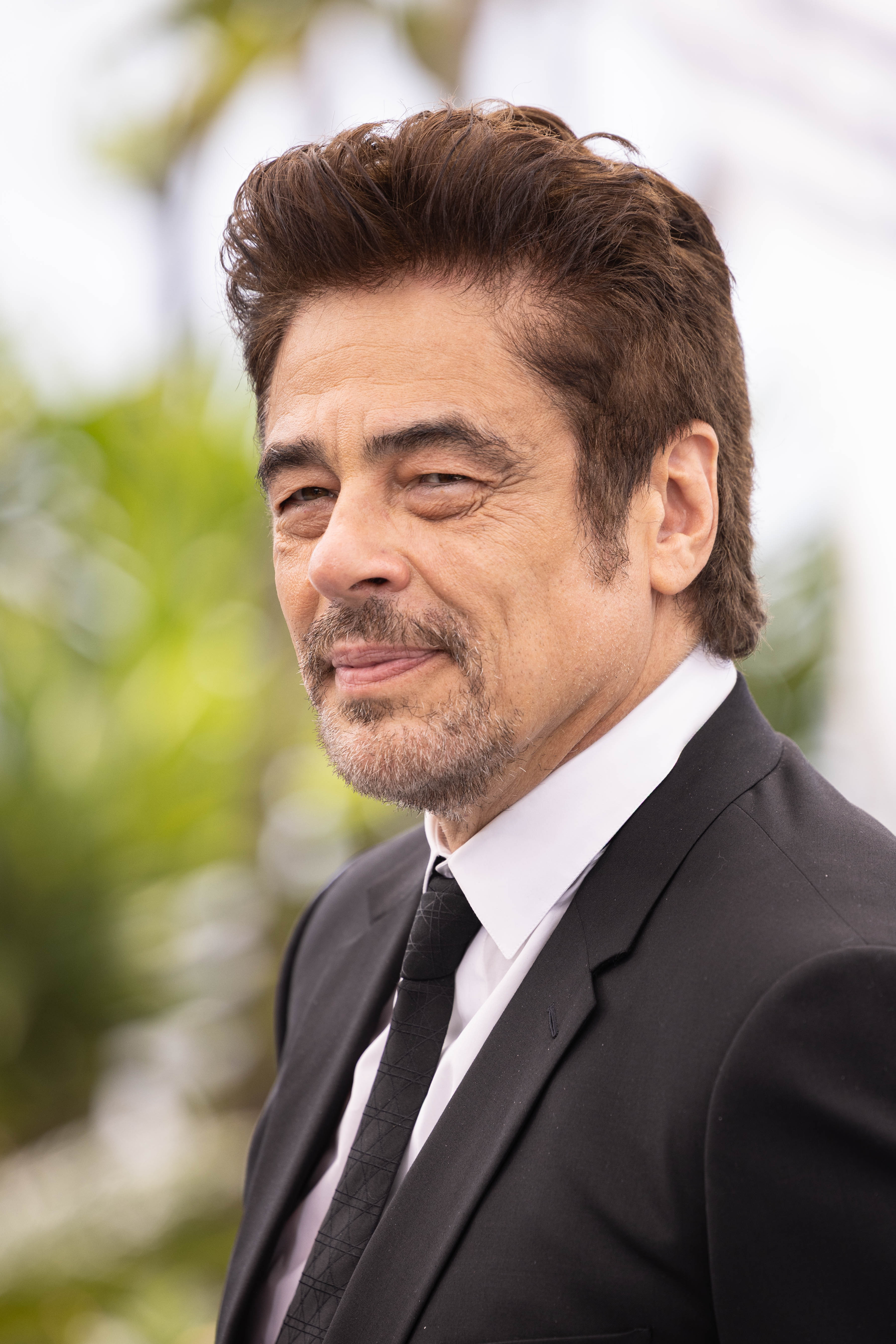
Benicio del Toro, Best Supporting Actor winner

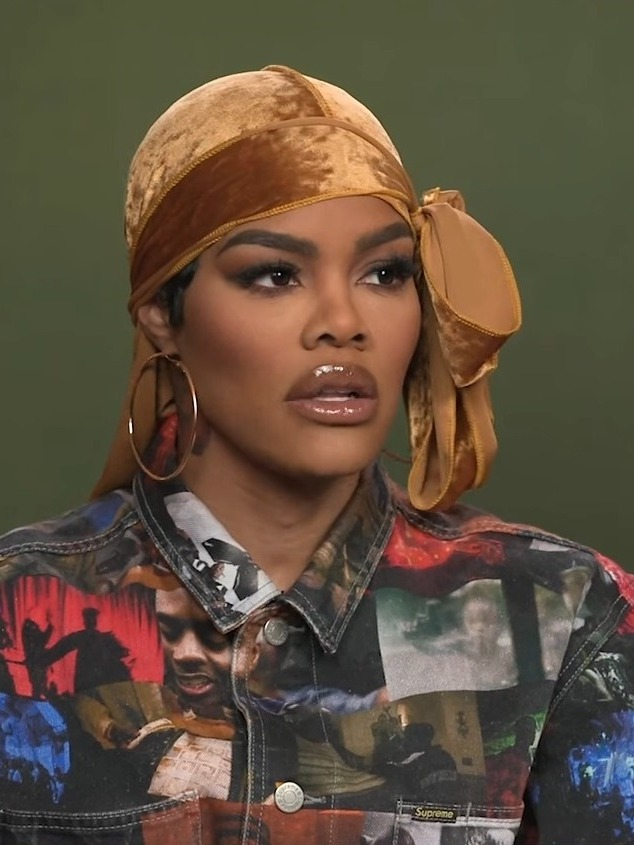
Teyana Taylor, Best Supporting Actress winner

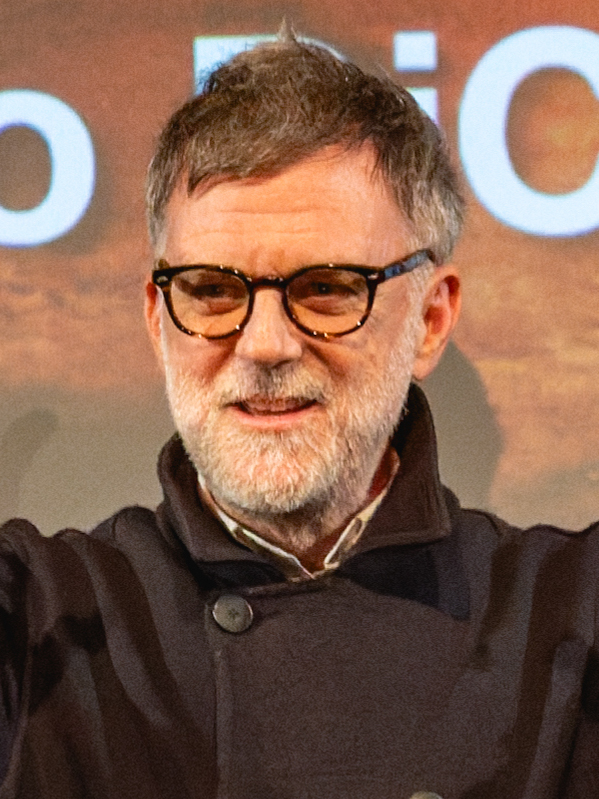
Paul Thomas Anderson, Best Adapted Screenplay winner

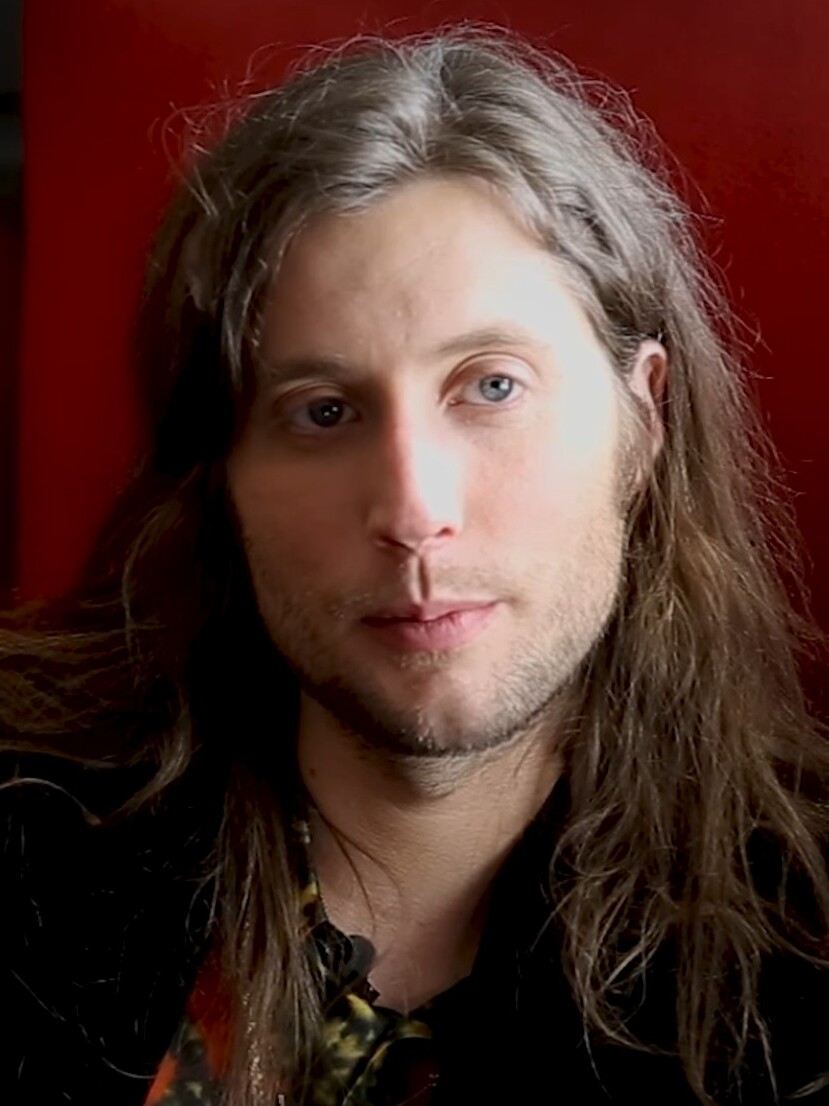
Ludwig Göransson, Best Original Score winner

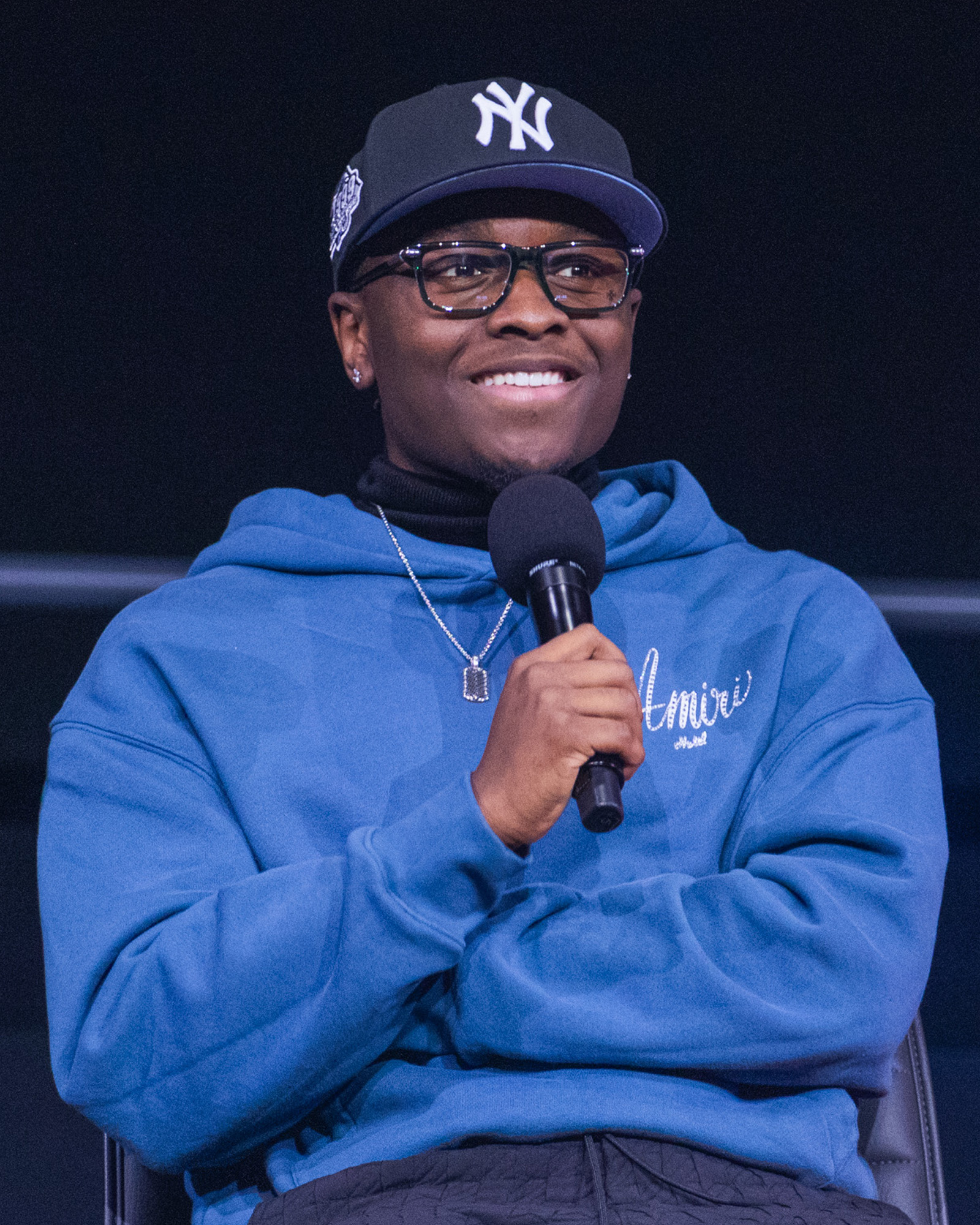
Miles Caton, Best Youth Performance winner

The winners are listed first and in boldface.

Best Film	Best Director
**Sinners**; Hamnet; Marty Supreme; One Battle After Another; Sentimental Value	**Ryan Coogler – Sinners**; Paul Thomas Anderson – One Battle After Another; Jafar Panahi – It Was Just an Accident; Josh Safdie – Marty Supreme; Chloé Zhao – Hamnet
Best Actor	Best Actress
**Michael B. Jordan – Sinners as Elijah "Smoke" Moore / Elias "Stack" Moore**; Timothée Chalamet – Marty Supreme as Marty Mauser; Leonardo DiCaprio – One Battle After Another as Bob Ferguson; Joel Edgerton – Train Dreams as Robert Grainier; Ethan Hawke – Blue Moon as Lorenz Hart	**Jessie Buckley – Hamnet as Agnes Shakespeare**; Rose Byrne – If I Had Legs I'd Kick You as Linda; Cynthia Erivo – Wicked: For Good as Elphaba Thropp; Chase Infiniti – One Battle After Another as Willa Ferguson; Renate Reinsve – Sentimental Value as Nora Borg
Best Supporting Actor	Best Supporting Actress
**Benicio del Toro – One Battle After Another as Sensei Sergio St. Carlos**; Jacob Elordi – Frankenstein as The Creature; Delroy Lindo – Sinners as Delta Slim; Sean Penn – One Battle After Another as Col. Steven J. Lockjaw; Stellan Skarsgård – Sentimental Value as Gustav Borg	**Teyana Taylor – One Battle After Another as Perfidia Beverly Hills**; Ariana Grande – Wicked: For Good as Galinda "Glinda" Upland; Inga Ibsdotter Lilleaas – Sentimental Value as Agnes Borg Pettersen; Amy Madigan – Weapons as Gladys; Wunmi Mosaku – Sinners as Annie
Best Original Screenplay	Best Adapted Screenplay
**Sinners – Ryan Coogler**; It Was Just an Accident – Jafar Panahi; Marty Supreme – Ronald Bronstein and Josh Safdie; Sentimental Value – Eskil Vogt and Joachim Trier; Weapons – Zach Cregger	**One Battle After Another – Paul Thomas Anderson**; Bugonia – Will Tracy; Frankenstein – Guillermo del Toro; Hamnet – Chloé Zhao and Maggie O'Farrell; Train Dreams – Clint Bentley and Greg Kwedar
Best Animated Feature	Best Documentary
**KPop Demon Hunters**; Arco; Elio; Little Amélie or the Character of Rain; Zootopia 2	**The Perfect Neighbor**; Come See Me in the Good Light; The Librarians; Orwell: 2+2=5; Put Your Soul on Your Hand and Walk
Best Foreign Language Film	Best Cinematography
**Sentimental Value (Norway)**; It Was Just an Accident (Iran); Left-Handed Girl (Taiwan); No Other Choice (South Korea); The Secret Agent (Brazil)	**Sinners – Autumn Durald Arkapaw**; Frankenstein – Dan Laustsen; Marty Supreme – Darius Khondji; One Battle After Another – Michael Bauman; Train Dreams – Adolpho Veloso
Best Editing	Best Original Score
**F1 – Stephen Mirrione (TIE)**; **Sinners – Michael P. Shawver (TIE)**; Hamnet – Chloé Zhao and Affonso Gonçalves; Marty Supreme – Ronald Bronstein and Josh Safdie; One Battle After Another – Andy Jurgensen	**Sinners – Ludwig Göransson**; Frankenstein – Alexandre Desplat; Hamnet – Max Richter; Marty Supreme – Daniel Lopatin; One Battle After Another – Jonny Greenwood
Best Production Design	Best Ensemble
**Sinners – Hannah Beachler and Monique Champagne**; The Fantastic Four: First Steps – Jille Azis and Kasra Farahani; Frankenstein – Tamara Deverell and Shane Vieau; Hamnet – Fiona Crombie and Alice Felton; Wicked: For Good – Nathan Crowley and Lee Sandales	**Sinners**; Hamnet; It Was Just an Accident; Marty Supreme; One Battle After Another; Sentimental Value; Wake Up Dead Man
Best Youth Performance	Best Voice Performance
**Miles Caton – Sinners as Samuel "Sammie" Moore**; Cary Christopher – Weapons as Alex Lilly; Shannon Mahina Gorman – Rental Family as Mia Kawasaki; Jacobi Jupe – Hamnet as Hamnet Shakespeare; Nina Ye – Left-Handed Girl as I-Jing; Mason Thames – How to Train Your Dragon as Hiccup Horrendous Haddock III	**Arden Cho – KPop Demon Hunters as Rumi**; Jason Bateman – Zootopia 2 as Nick Wilde; Ginnifer Goodwin – Zootopia 2 as Judy Hopps; Yonas Kibreab – Elio as Elio Solís; Ke Huy Quan – Zootopia 2 as Gary De'Snake
Best Stunts	Best Motion Capture Performance
**Mission: Impossible – The Final Reckoning**; F1; One Battle After Another; Sinners; Superman	**Zoe Saldaña – Avatar: Fire and Ash as Neytiri**; Oona Chaplin – Avatar: Fire and Ash as Varang; Stephen Lang – Avatar: Fire and Ash as Colonel Miles Quaritch; Sigourney Weaver – Avatar: Fire and Ash as Kiri; Sam Worthington – Avatar: Fire and Ash as Jake Sully
Joe Barber Award for Best Portrayal of Washington, D.C.
**A House of Dynamite**; Anniversary; Captain America: Brave New World; Nuremberg; Thunderbolts*

== Multiple nominations and wins ==
The following films received multiple nominations:

Nominations	Film
13	One Battle After Another
13	Sinners
9	Hamnet
8	Marty Supreme
7	Sentimental Value
5	Avatar: Fire and Ash
5	Frankenstein
4	It Was Just an Accident
4	Zootopia 2
3	Train Dreams
3	Weapons
3	Wicked: For Good
2	Elio
2	F1
2	KPop Demon Hunters
2	Left-Handed Girl

The following films received multiple awards:

Wins	Film
10	Sinners
3	One Battle After Another
2	KPop Demon Hunters
