= List of accolades received by The Florida Project =

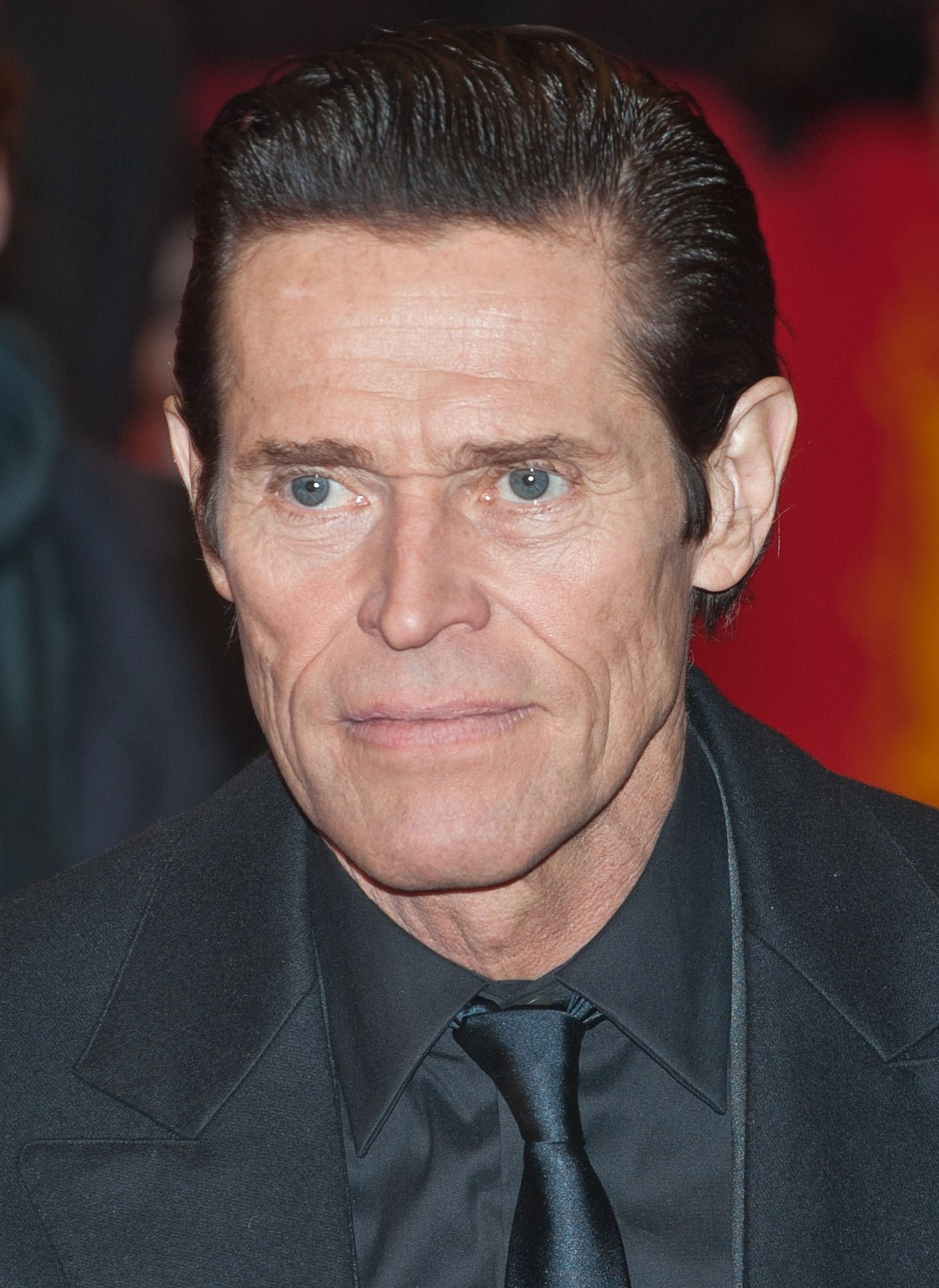
- Willem Dafoe's performance earned him a nomination for the Academy Award for Best Supporting Actor.
Accolades
| Award | Won | Nominated |
| AACTA International Awards | 0 | 1 |
| AARP's Movies for Grownups Awards | 1 | 2 |
| Academy Awards | 0 | 1 |
| Alliance of Women Film Journalists | 2 | 2 |
| American Film Institute | 1 | 1 |
| Austin Film Critics Association | 1 | 2 |
| Belgian Film Critics Association | 0 | 1 |
| Boston Society of Film Critics | 1 | 1 |
| British Academy Film Awards | 0 | 1 |
| British Independent Film Awards | 0 | 1 |
| Casting Society of America | 0 | 1 |
| Chicago Film Critics Association | 1 | 5 |
| Critics' Choice Awards | 1 | 3 |
| Dallas-Fort Worth Film Critics Association | 1 | 3 |
| Detroit Film Critics Society | 3 | 3 |
| Dorian Awards | 0 | 2 |
| Dublin Film Critics' Circle | 0 | 6 |
| Florida Film Critics Circle | 1 | 2 |
| Georgia Film Critics Association | 1 | 5 |
| Golden Globe Awards | 0 | 1 |
| Golden Tomato Awards | 0 | 2 |
| Gotham Awards | 0 | 4 |
| Guild of Music Supervisors Awards | 0 | 1 |
| Hamburg Film Festival | 1 | 1 |
| Heartland Film Festival | 1 | 1 |
| Hollywood Music in Media Awards | 0 | 1 |
| Houston Film Critics Society | 0 | 3 |
| IGN Awards | 0 | 1 |
| Independent Spirit Awards | 0 | 2 |
| IndieWire Critics Poll | 1 | 3 |
| International Antalya Film Festival | 1 | 1 |
| Location Managers Guild Awards | 0 | 1 |
| London Film Critics' Circle | 1 | 3 |
| Los Angeles Film Critics Association | 1 | 2 |
| National Board of Review | 2 | 2 |
| National Society of Film Critics | 1 | 2 |
| New York Film Critics Circle | 2 | 2 |
| New York Film Critics Online | 3 | 3 |
| Online Film Critics Society | 0 | 2 |
| San Diego Film Critics Society | 0 | 2 |
| San Francisco Film Critics Circle | 2 | 4 |
| Santa Barbara International Film Festival | 1 | 1 |
| Satellite Awards | 0 | 3 |
| Screen Actors Guild Awards | 0 | 1 |
| Seattle Film Critics Society | 2 | 5 |
| St. Louis Gateway Film Critics Association | 0 | 1 |
| Toronto Film Critics Association | 2 | 2 |
| Vancouver Film Critics Circle | 1 | 1 |
| Washington D.C. Area Film Critics Association | 1 | 2 |
| Women Film Critics Circle | 1 | 2 |

Total number of awards and nominations (Note: Certain award groups do not award only one winner, as they may recognize several recipients, and include runners-up. Since this is a specific recognition and is different from losing an award, runner-up mentions are considered wins in the awards tally.) (Note: Organizations without a Wikipedia page are not included in list of accolades.)
| Totals | 38 | 105 | |
- References

The Florida Project is a 2017 American drama film directed by Sean Baker and written by Baker and Chris Bergoch. It stars Brooklynn Prince, Willem Dafoe, Bria Vinaite, Valeria Cotto, Christopher Rivera, and Caleb Landry Jones. The plot follows a six-year-old girl living with her rebellious mother in a motel in Kissimmee, Florida (outside Orlando) as they try to stay out of trouble and make ends meet. The Florida Project premiered in the Directors' Fortnight section of the 2017 Cannes Film Festival, and was theatrically released in the United States on October 6, 2017, by A24.

On review aggregator website Rotten Tomatoes, The Florida Project has an approval rating of 96% based on 254 reviews. On Metacritic, the film holds a weighted average score of 92 out of 100, based on 44 critics, indicating "universal acclaim".

For his role, Willem Dafoe was nominated for Best Supporting Actor at the 90th Academy Awards, and was likewise nominated for Best Supporting Actor – Motion Picture at the 75th Golden Globe Awards. At the 23rd Critics' Choice Awards, the film was nominated for three awards, winning Best Young Performer for Prince. In addition, it was selected as one of the top ten films of the year by the American Film Institute and the National Board of Review.

== Awards and nominations ==
| Award | Date of ceremony | Category | Recipient(s) | Result | Ref. |
|---|---|---|---|---|---|
| AACTA International Awards | January 6, 2018 | Best Supporting Actor | Willem Dafoe | Nominated | |
| AARP's Movies for Grownups Awards | February 5, 2018 | Best Supporting Actor | Willem Dafoe | Nominated | |
| AARP's Movies for Grownups Awards | February 5, 2018 | Best Intergenerational Film | The Florida Project | Won | |
| Academy Awards | March 4, 2018 | Best Supporting Actor | Willem Dafoe | Nominated | |
| Alliance of Women Film Journalists | January 9, 2018 | Best Actor in a Supporting Role | Willem Dafoe | Won | |
| Alliance of Women Film Journalists | January 9, 2018 | Best Breakthrough Performance | Brooklynn Prince | Won | |
| American Film Institute | January 5, 2018 | Top Ten Films of the Year | The Florida Project | Won | |
| Austin Film Critics Association | January 8, 2018 | Best Supporting Actor | Willem Dafoe | Won | |
| Austin Film Critics Association | January 8, 2018 | Top 10 Films | The Florida Project | 5th place | |
| Belgian Film Critics Association | January 5, 2019 | Grand Prix | The Florida Project | Nominated | |
| Boston Society of Film Critics | December 10, 2017 | Best Supporting Actor | Willem Dafoe | Won | |
| British Academy Film Awards | February 18, 2018 | Best Actor in a Supporting Role | Willem Dafoe | Nominated | |
| British Independent Film Awards | December 10, 2017 | Best International Independent Film | The Florida Project | Nominated | |
| Casting Society of America | January 18, 2018 | Studio or Independent – Drama | Carmen Cuba and Mark Mullen | Nominated | |
| Chicago Film Critics Association | December 12, 2017 | Best Supporting Actor | Willem Dafoe | Won | |
| Chicago Film Critics Association | December 12, 2017 | Best Editing | Sean Baker | Nominated | |
| Chicago Film Critics Association | December 12, 2017 | Best Cinematography | Alexis Zabe | Nominated | |
| Chicago Film Critics Association | December 12, 2017 | Most Promising Performer | Brooklynn Prince | Nominated | |
| Chicago Film Critics Association | December 12, 2017 | Most Promising Performer | Bria Vinaite | Nominated | |
| Critics' Choice Movie Awards | January 11, 2018 | Best Picture | The Florida Project | Nominated | |
| Critics' Choice Movie Awards | January 11, 2018 | Best Supporting Actor | Willem Dafoe | Nominated | |
| Critics' Choice Movie Awards | January 11, 2018 | Best Young Performer | Brooklynn Prince | Won | |
| Dallas–Fort Worth Film Critics Association | December 13, 2017 | Best Film | The Florida Project | 9th place | |
| Dallas–Fort Worth Film Critics Association | December 13, 2017 | Best Supporting Actor | Willem Dafoe | Runner-up | |
| Dallas–Fort Worth Film Critics Association | December 13, 2017 | Russell Smith Award | The Florida Project | Won | |
| Detroit Film Critics Society | December 7, 2017 | Best Film | The Florida Project | Won | |
| Detroit Film Critics Society | December 7, 2017 | Best Director | Sean Baker | Won | |
| Detroit Film Critics Society | December 7, 2017 | Best Supporting Actor | Willem Dafoe | Won | |
| Dorian Awards | February 24, 2018 | Director of the Year | Sean Baker | Nominated | |
| Dorian Awards | February 24, 2018 | Supporting Film Performance of the Year – Actor | Willem Dafoe | Nominated | |
| Dublin Film Critics' Circle | December 14, 2017 | Best Film | The Florida Project (Note: Tied with Call Me by Your Name) | 7th place | |
| Dublin Film Critics' Circle | December 14, 2017 | Best Director | Sean Baker | 9th place | |
| Dublin Film Critics' Circle | December 14, 2017 | Best Screenplay | Sean Baker and Chris Bergoch | Runner-up | |
| Dublin Film Critics' Circle | December 14, 2017 | Best Actor | Willem Dafoe | 8th place | |
| Dublin Film Critics' Circle | December 14, 2017 | Best Cinematography | Alexis Zabe | 6th place | |
| Dublin Film Critics' Circle | December 14, 2017 | Breakthrough Artist of the Year | Brooklynn Prince | Nominated | |
| Florida Film Critics Circle | December 23, 2017 | Best Supporting Actor | Willem Dafoe | Runner-up | |
| Florida Film Critics Circle | December 23, 2017 | Golden Orange | The cast and crew of The Florida Project | Won | |
| Georgia Film Critics Association | January 12, 2018 | Best Picture | The Florida Project | Nominated | |
| Georgia Film Critics Association | January 12, 2018 | Best Supporting Actor | Willem Dafoe | Won | |
| Georgia Film Critics Association | January 12, 2018 | Best Supporting Actress | Bria Vinaite | Nominated | |
| Georgia Film Critics Association | January 12, 2018 | Best Cinematography | Alexis Zabe | Nominated | |
| Georgia Film Critics Association | January 12, 2018 | Breakthrough Award | Brooklynn Prince | Nominated | |
| Golden Globe Awards | January 7, 2018 | Best Supporting Actor – Motion Picture | Willem Dafoe | Nominated | |
| Golden Tomato Awards | January 3, 2018 | Best Limited Release 2017 | The Florida Project | 3rd Place | |
| Golden Tomato Awards | January 3, 2018 | Best Drama Movie 2017 | The Florida Project | 2nd Place | |
| Gotham Awards | November 27, 2017 | Best Feature | The Florida Project | Nominated | |
| Gotham Awards | November 27, 2017 | Best Actor | Willem Dafoe | Nominated | |
| Gotham Awards | November 27, 2017 | Breakthrough Actor | Brooklynn Prince | Nominated | |
| Gotham Awards | November 27, 2017 | Audience Award | The Florida Project | Nominated | |
| Guild of Music Supervisors Awards | February 8, 2018 | Best Music Supervision for Film: Budgeted Under 5 Million Dollars | Matthew Hearon-Smith | Nominated | |
| Hamburg Film Festival | October 10, 2017 | Hamburg Film Critic Award | The Florida Project | Won | |
| Heartland Film Festival | November 20, 2017 | Truly Moving Picture Award | The Florida Project | Won | |
| Hollywood Music in Media Awards | November 16, 2017 | Outstanding Music Supervision – Film | Matthew Hearon-Smith | Nominated | |
| Houston Film Critics Society | January 6, 2018 | Best Picture | The Florida Project | Nominated | |
| Houston Film Critics Society | January 6, 2018 | Best Actress | Brooklynn Prince | Nominated | |
| Houston Film Critics Society | January 6, 2018 | Best Supporting Actor | Willem Dafoe | Nominated | |
| IGN Awards | December 19, 2017 | Best Supporting Performer in a Movie | Willem Dafoe | Nominated | |
| Independent Spirit Awards | March 3, 2018 | Best Feature | The Florida Project | Nominated | |
| Independent Spirit Awards | March 3, 2018 | Best Director | Sean Baker | Nominated | |
| IndieWire Critics Poll | December 19, 2017 | Best Picture | The Florida Project | 5th place | |
| IndieWire Critics Poll | December 19, 2017 | Best Director | Sean Baker | 4th place | |
| IndieWire Critics Poll | December 19, 2017 | Best Supporting Actor | Willem Dafoe | Won | |
| International Antalya Film Festival | October 27, 2017 | Jury Special Award | The Florida Project | Won | |
| Location Managers Guild Awards | April 7, 2018 | Outstanding Locations in Contemporary Film | Stacey McGillis | Nominated | |
| London Film Critics Circle | January 28, 2018 | Film of the Year | The Florida Project | Nominated | |
| London Film Critics Circle | January 28, 2018 | Director of the Year | Sean Baker | Won | |
| London Film Critics Circle | January 28, 2018 | Supporting Actor of the Year | Willem Dafoe | Nominated | |
| Los Angeles Film Critics Association | January 13, 2018 | Best Film | The Florida Project | Runner-up | |
| Los Angeles Film Critics Association | January 13, 2018 | Best Supporting Actor | Willem Dafoe | Won | |
| National Board of Review | January 9, 2018 | Best Supporting Actor | Willem Dafoe | Won | |
| National Board of Review | January 9, 2018 | Top Ten Films | The Florida Project | Won | |
| National Society of Film Critics | January 6, 2018 | Best Supporting Actor | Willem Dafoe | Won | |
| National Society of Film Critics | January 6, 2018 | Best Cinematography | Alexis Zabe | 3rd Place | |
| New York Film Critics Circle | January 3, 2018 | Best Director | Sean Baker | Won | |
| New York Film Critics Circle | January 3, 2018 | Best Supporting Actor | Willem Dafoe | Won | |
| New York Film Critics Online | December 10, 2017 | Best Picture | The Florida Project (Note: Tied with Mudbound) | Won | |
| New York Film Critics Online | December 10, 2017 | Best Supporting Actor | Willem Dafoe | Won | |
| New York Film Critics Online | December 10, 2017 | Top Ten Films | The Florida Project | Won | |
| Online Film Critics Society | December 28, 2017 | Best Picture | The Florida Project | Nominated | |
| Online Film Critics Society | December 28, 2017 | Best Breakout Star | Brooklynn Prince | Nominated | |
| San Diego Film Critics Society | December 11, 2017 | Best Supporting Actor | Willem Dafoe | Runner-up | |
| San Diego Film Critics Society | December 11, 2017 | Best Supporting Actress | Bria Vinaite | Nominated | |
| San Francisco Film Critics Circle | December 10, 2017 | Best Film | The Florida Project | Won | |
| San Francisco Film Critics Circle | December 10, 2017 | Best Director | Sean Baker | Nominated | |
| San Francisco Film Critics Circle | December 10, 2017 | Best Supporting Actor | Willem Dafoe | Won | |
| San Francisco Film Critics Circle | December 10, 2017 | Best Cinematography | Alexis Zabe | Nominated | |
| Santa Barbara International Film Festival | January 31, 2018 | Cinema Vanguard Award | Willem Dafoe | Won | |
| Satellite Awards | February 10, 2018 | Best Director | Sean Baker | Nominated | |
| Satellite Awards | February 10, 2018 | Best Supporting Actor | Willem Dafoe | Nominated | |
| Satellite Awards | February 10, 2018 | Best Original Screenplay | Sean Baker and Chris Bergoch | Nominated | |
| Screen Actors Guild Awards | January 21, 2018 | Outstanding Performance by a Male Actor in a Supporting Role | Willem Dafoe | Nominated | |
| Seattle Film Critics Society | December 18, 2017 | Best Picture | The Florida Project | Nominated | |
| Seattle Film Critics Society | December 18, 2017 | Best Director | Sean Baker | Nominated | |
| Seattle Film Critics Society | December 18, 2017 | Best Actor in a Supporting Role | Willem Dafoe | Won | |
| Seattle Film Critics Society | December 18, 2017 | Best Cinematography | Alexis Zabe | Nominated | |
| Seattle Film Critics Society | December 18, 2017 | Best Youth Performance | Brooklynn Prince | Won | |
| St. Louis Film Critics Association | December 17, 2017 | Best Supporting Actor | Willem Dafoe | Nominated | |
| Toronto Film Critics Association | December 10, 2017 | Best Film | The Florida Project | Won | |
| Toronto Film Critics Association | December 10, 2017 | Best Supporting Actor | Willem Dafoe | Won | |
| Vancouver Film Critics Circle | January 6, 2018 | Best Supporting Actor | Willem Dafoe | Won | |
| Washington D.C. Area Film Critics Association | December 8, 2017 | Best Supporting Actor | Willem Dafoe | Nominated | |
| Washington D.C. Area Film Critics Association | December 8, 2017 | Best Youth Performance | Brooklynn Prince | Won | |
| Women Film Critics Circle | December 17, 2017 | Best Movie About Women | The Florida Project | Nominated | |
| Women Film Critics Circle | December 17, 2017 | Best Young Actress | Brooklynn Prince | Won | |
