= Detroit Film Critics Society Award for Best Director =

Annual US film award

The Detroit Film Critics Society Award for Best Director is an annual award given by the Detroit Film Critics Society to honor the best director of that year.

== Winners ==
indicates the winners.

=== 2000s ===
Year	Director(s)	Film
2007	Joel and Ethan Coen	No Country for Old Men
2007	Paul Thomas Anderson	There Will Be Blood
2007	Tim Burton	Sweeney Todd: The Demon Barber of Fleet Street
2007	Sean Penn	Into the Wild
2007	Jason Reitman	Juno
2007	Julian Schnabel	Le scaphandre et le papillon (The Diving Bell and the Butterfly)
2008	Danny Boyle	Slumdog Millionaire
2008	Darren Aronofsky	The Wrestler
2008	Ron Howard	Frost/Nixon
2008	Christopher Nolan	The Dark Knight
2008	Andrew Stanton	WALL-E
2009	Pete Docter	Up
2009	Kathryn Bigelow	The Hurt Locker
2009	Jason Reitman	Up in the Air
2009	Quentin Tarantino	Inglourious Basterds
2009	Marc Webb	(500) Days of Summer

=== 2010s ===
Year	Director(s)	Film
2010	Danny Boyle	127 Hours
2010	David Fincher	The Social Network
2010	Debra Granik	Winter's Bone
2010	Tom Hooper	The King's Speech
2010	Christopher Nolan	Inception
2010	Edgar Wright	Scott Pilgrim vs. the World
2011	Michel Hazanavicius	The Artist
2011	Terrence Malick	The Tree of Life
2011	Jeff Nichols	Take Shelter
2011	Martin Scorsese	Hugo
2011	Nicolas Winding Refn	Drive
2012	David O. Russell	Silver Linings Playbook
2012	Ben Affleck	Argo
2012	Juan Antonio Bayona	The Impossible
2012	Kathryn Bigelow	Zero Dark Thirty
2012	Sarah Polley	Take This Waltz
2013	Alfonso Cuarón	Gravity
2013	David O. Russell	American Hustle
2013	Martin Scorsese	The Wolf of Wall Street
2013	Paul Greengrass	Captain Phillips
2013	Spike Jonze	Her
2014	Richard Linklater	Boyhood
2014	Wes Anderson	The Grand Budapest Hotel
2014	Damien Chazelle	Whiplash
2014	Jonathan Glazer	Under the Skin
2014	Alejandro González Iñárritu	Birdman or (The Unexpected Virtue of Ignorance)
2015	George Miller	Mad Max: Fury Road
2015	John Crowley	Brooklyn
2015	Alejandro G. Iñárritu	The Revenant
2015	Tom McCarthy	Spotlight
2015	Paolo Sorrentino	Youth
2016	Damien Chazelle	La La Land
2016	Barry Jenkins	Moonlight
2016	Kenneth Lonergan	Manchester by the Sea
2016	David Mackenzie	Hell or High Water
2016	Denzel Washington	Fences
2017	Sean Baker	The Florida Project
2017	Paul Thomas Anderson	Phantom Thread
2017	Guillermo del Toro	The Shape of Water
2017	Greta Gerwig	Lady Bird
2017	Christopher Nolan	Dunkirk
2017	Jordan Peele	Get Out
2018	Adam McKay	Vice
2018	Bo Burnham	Eighth Grade
2018	Bradley Cooper	A Star is Born
2018	Alfonso Cuarón	Roma
2018	Paul Schrader	First Reformed
2019	Martin Scorsese	The Irishman
2019	Noah Baumbach	Marriage Story
2019	Bong Joon-ho	Parasite
2019	Quentin Tarantino	Once Upon a Time in Hollywood
2019	Taika Waititi	Jojo Rabbit

=== 2020s ===
Year	Director(s)	Film
2020	Chloé Zhao	Nomadland
2020	Lee Isaac Chung	Minari
2020	Regina King	One Night in Miami...
2020	Aaron Sorkin	The Trial of the Chicago 7
2020	Spike Lee	Da 5 Bloods
2021	Lin-Manuel Miranda	tick, tick…BOOM!
2021	Sean Baker	Red Rocket
2021	Kenneth Branagh	Belfast
2021	David Lowery	The Green Knight
2021	Adam McKay	Don't Look Up

== See also ==
- Academy Award for Best Director
