= Dark Feed =

- Directed by: Michael Rasmussen; Shawn Rasmussen
- Written by: Michael Rasmussen; Shawn Rasmussen
- Starring: Evalena Marie, Jason Beaubien, Michael Reed
- Cinematography: Monday Sunnlinn
- Edited by: Michael Rasmussen, Reuter (as Michael Reuter)
- Production company: Rasmussen Brothers Productions
- Distributed by: Lionsgate Home Entertainment
- Release date: March 18, 2013
- Running time: 86 minutes
- Country: United States
- Language: English

Dark Feed is a 2013 horror film written and directed by Shawn and Michael Rasmussen. It was first released on March 18, 2013 and centers upon a group of filmmakers that decide to cut costs by filming in an abandoned psychiatric hospital, only to end up slowly turning insane. Filming took place in New England using some of the buildings seen in Shutter Island. The Rasmussens came up with the idea for Dark Feed while visiting the set of another film, Long Distance, which was filming in an abandoned psychiatric hospital.

== Synopsis ==
The movie follows a film crew that decides to film a low budget horror film in an abandoned psychiatric hospital. They're already exhausted and overworked, making them eager to finish the project and move on. Unfortunately their presence seems to bring new life to the hospital, and it starts to exert a strange influence over the cast and crew, causing them to act in increasingly bizarre ways. The remaining crew members must find a way to escape from the hospital before they also end up becoming its victims.

== Cast ==
- Evalena Marie as Pierced Girl
- Jason Beaubien as Andrei
- Michael Reed as Jack
- Bree Elrod as M.G.
- Victoria Nugent as Beth
- Mark DeAngelis as DP
- Dayna Cousins as Marissa
- Jonathan Thomson as Harry
- Michael Scott Allen as Darrell
- Rebecca Whitehurst as Rachel
- Hardy Winburn as Chuck
- Andrew Rudick as Chris (as Andy Rudick)
- Jessica Lauren Napier as Jessica
- Daniel Berger-Jones as Mitch
- Danny Bryck as Brian

== Reception ==
Critical reception for Dark Feed was mixed. Shock Till You Drop gave a predominantly negative review, criticizing it as "a boring and unoriginal film unworthy of watching." In contrast, Fearnet's review was more positive and Weinberg commented that although the film had "a lot of stuff you've seen before", the movie "re-heated and reconfigured into a crafty little creeper that actually works". Starburst gave the film a score of 5/10, saying that the movie was "utterly unmemorable but not otherwise bad".
