= Dave Merheje =

Canadian stand-up comedian

- Born: Windsor, Ontario
- Citizenship: Canada
- Education: St. Clair College
- Occupations: Comedian; actor

Dave Merheje is a Canadian stand-up comedian. He is known for his roles in Mr. D and Ramy, as well as his 2019 comedy album Good Friend Bad Grammar, which earned him the Juno Award for Comedy Album of the Year at the 2019 Juno Awards.

== Early life ==
Merheje was born in Windsor, Ontario to a Lebanese family. He attended Catholic Central High School and later St. Clair College, graduating from the business marketing program in 2003.

== Career ==
Merheje began performing comedy in the Windsor-Detroit area. He has since performed at venues including Just For Laughs, the Halifax Comedy Festival, the Winnipeg Comedy Festival and the Melbourne International Comedy Festival. In 2015, he had his own stand-up special on The Comedy Network. Merheje has performed with other Canadian comedians of South Asian or Middle Eastern descent, including Ali Badshah and Ali Hassan, in the touring We Ain't Terrorists comedy show. He was also featured in an episode of the Netflix stand-up comedy series Comedians of the World.

Merheje had a recurring role as Dave Bechara in the Canadian television sitcom Mr. D.. Since 2019, he has portrayed the role of Ahmed on the Hulu comedy series Ramy.

Merheje's comedy album Good Friend Bad Grammar won the Juno Award for Comedy Album of the Year at the 2019 Juno Awards.

== Filmography ==
| Year | Title | Role |
|---|---|---|
| 2017-2018 | Mr. D | Dave Bechara |
| 2019-present | Ramy | Ahmed |
| 2023 | Sometimes I Think About Dying | Robert |
