= Chris Bergoch =

American screenwriter and producer

- Occupations: Producer, Writer
- Years active: 2002—present

Chris Bergoch (/bərˈɡɒʃ/ bər-GOSH) is an American screenwriter and producer, who co-wrote the films The Florida Project, Tangerine, Starlet and Red Rocket as well as additional writing on the television shows Greg the Bunny and Warren the Ape.

Bergoch is writer/producer of The Florida Project, a 2017 American drama film co-written and directed by Sean Baker. It premiered at the Directors' Fortnight section of the 2017 Cannes Film Festival.

== Early life and education ==
Bergoch received his B.F.A. in Film & Television Production from the New York University Tisch School of the Arts where he met Sean Baker.

== Career ==
Bergoch collaborated on the writing of all five incarnations of the television sitcom Greg the Bunny which include the IFC and FOX versions. He contributed songs to the Rock Opera which closed out the 2010 MTV series Warren the Ape, as well as doing some production work on that show.

Bergoch was co-producer on Dealing, a Matthew Huffman feature film which won the audience award at the Big Bear Lake International Film Festival.

With Sean S. Baker, Bergoch co-wrote the film Starlet which was released on November 9, 2012, in the US by Music Box Films. He is also associate producer of that film. He re-teamed with Baker to co-write and co-produce the film Tangerine, which premiered at the 2015 Sundance Film Festival and was well received by critics upon its Summer 2015 release by Magnolia Pictures. Bergoch co-wrote and co-produced Baker's feature film The Florida Project, which was released in October 2017 and went on to receive 113 nominations, including one Oscar nomination, and 38 wins. Bergoch co-wrote Baker's next feature film Red Rocket starring Simon Rex. Production took place in Texas in November 2020. Bergoch and Baker were nominated for Best Screenplay at the 2021 Gotham Awards.

== Filmography ==
- 2012: Starlet – co-screenwriter, producer
- 2012: Dealing – producer
- 2015: Tangerine – co-screenwriter, co-producer
- 2016: Snowbird – co-producer
- 2017: The Florida Project – co-screenwriter, co-producer
- 2021: Red Rocket – co-screenwriter

== Accolades ==
Award	Date of ceremony	Category	Nominated work	Result	Notes	Ref
Film Fest 919	October 22, 2021	Distinguished Screenwriter Award	Red Rocket	Won	Jointly with Sean Baker.	
Gotham Awards	November 29, 2021	Best Screenplay	Red Rocket	Nominated	Jointly with Sean Baker.	
