= Sometimes I Think About Dying =

2023 American film by Rachel Lambert

- Theatrical release poster
- Directed by: Rachel Lambert
- Written by: Kevin Armento; Stefanie Abel Horowitz; Katy Wright-Mead
- Based on: Killers by Kevin Armento
- Produced by: Alex Saks; Daisy Ridley; Dori Rath; Lauren Beveridge; Brett Beveridge
- Starring: Daisy Ridley; Dave Merheje; Parvesh Cheena; Marcia DeBonis; Meg Stalter; Brittany O'Grady; Bree Elrod
- Cinematography: Dustin Lane
- Edited by: Ryan Kendrick
- Music by: Dabney Morris
- Production companies: Point Productions; Saks Picture Company
- Distributed by: Oscilloscope Laboratories
- Release dates: January 19, 2023 (Sundance); January 26, 2024 (United States)
- Running time: 93 minutes
- Country: United States
- Language: English
- Box office: $245,127

Sometimes I Think About Dying is a 2023 American romantic comedy drama film directed by Rachel Lambert, and written by Kevin Armento, Stefanie Abel Horowitz, and Katy Wright-Mead. It is based on the 2014 play Killers by Armento, and a short film that was released in 2019, directed and co-written by Horowitz. The film stars Daisy Ridley, Dave Merheje, Parvesh Cheena, Marcia DeBonis, Meg Stalter, Brittany O'Grady, and Bree Elrod.

The film premiered at the Sundance Film Festival on January 19, 2023, and was released on January 26, 2024.

== Premise ==
Fran is a socially awkward office worker who spends most of her time in isolation and daydreams of her own death, until a new colleague pricks the bubble of her own isolation.

== Cast ==
- Daisy Ridley as Fran Larsen
- Dave Merheje as Robert Naser
- Parvesh Cheena as Garrett
- Marcia DeBonis as Carol
- Meg Stalter as Isobel
- Brittany O'Grady as Sophie
- Bree Elrod as Amelia
- Lauren Beveridge as Tellulah
- Ayanna Berkshire as Emma
- Sean Tarjyoto as Sean
- Jeb Berrier as Doug
- Rich Hinz as Rich
- Treasure Lunan as Bennie
- June Eisler as June

== Production ==
In October 2021, it was reported that Daisy Ridley secretly shot an independent drama in Astoria, Oregon; the project would later be announced in December 2021 in which Ridley also produced the film with Rachel Lambert directing. The screenplay by Kevin Armento is a partial adaptation of his own 2013 play Killers, with Stefanie Abel Horowitz, who directed a 2019 short of the same name, also a screenwriter along with Katy Wright-Mead. All three had also been credited with screenwriting the 2019 short and Horowitz had also directed the 2013 play.

The film is set in a small city on the coast of Oregon. Ridley told a crowd at the Sundance Film Festival that she related to Fran saying "Like, sometimes I feel like a piece of fucking shit. And sometimes I feel, like, great…What was interesting with Fran was sometimes she's sort of obnoxious. Sometimes, she's like, 'I don't want to play your games. I don't want to talk about food. I'm good, I'm apart from this.' And other times, she's like, 'How do I become part of this?' So I resonated with that."

== Release ==
Sometimes I Think About Dying premiered at the Sundance Film Festival on January 19, 2023. In April 2023, Oscilloscope acquired the US distribution rights to the film. The UK distribution rights were acquired by Vertigo Releasing in May 2023. It was released in the United States on January 26, 2024, and in the United Kingdom on April 19.

== Reception ==
On the review aggregator website Rotten Tomatoes, 82% of 130 critics' reviews are positive, with an average rating of 6.8/10. The website's consensus reads: "Departing from corporate comedy, Sometimes I Think About Dying modestly explores critical human connection through a superbly melancholic Daisy Ridley." Metacritic, which uses a weighted average, assigned the film a score of 68 out of 100, based on 26 critics, indicating "generally favorable" reviews.

Helen O'Hara in Empire described a "beautiful, subdued Daisy Ridley performance" and wrote "if you’re tired of blockbuster bombast, this could be the antidote". Peter Debruge in Variety said, "Movies tend to cut these bits out, to focus on the escapist stuff, but every once in a while one comes along, searching for poetry in the mundane." Ridley's character Fran's daydreams are shown as images, and Debruge noted that those "scenes are unexpected, surreal, accompanied by a lovely, meditative string score from composer Dabney Morris. Fran doesn't seem suicidal, but she isn't particularly engaged in life either. The character’s personality is so understated, it's strange to find someone of Ridley's stature drawn to such a self-effacing role". Lovia Gyarkye said in The Hollywood Reporter, "Loneliness is the subject of a poetic exploration…Fran is too distinctively drawn to be just an avatar, but the impressions of her solitude are aching reminders of how modern life nurtures an unsettling separateness… Sometimes I Think About Dying, then, is a graceful treatise on how challenging — but liberating — it can be to make connections."
