= Left-Handed Girl =

2025 drama film

- Promotional poster
- Chinese: 左撇子女孩
- Directed by: Shih-Ching Tsou
- Written by: Shih-Ching Tsou; Sean Baker
- Produced by: Shih-Ching Tsou; Sean Baker; Mike Goodridge
- Starring: Janel Tsai; Ma Shih-Yuan; Nina Ye; Brando Huang; Akio Chen; Xin-Yan Chao
- Cinematography: Ko-Chin Chen; Tzu-Hao Kao
- Edited by: Sean Baker
- Production companies: Good Chaos; Cre Film; Le Pacte
- Distributed by: Le Pacte (France); Netflix (United States and United Kingdom); Light Year Images (Taiwan)
- Release dates: May 15, 2025 (Cannes); September 17, 2025 (France); November 14, 2025 (United States); November 28, 2025 (Netflix)
- Running time: 109 minutes
- Countries: Taiwan; United States; United Kingdom; France
- Languages: Mandarin; Taiwanese Hokkien

Left-Handed Girl (Chinese: 左撇子女孩) is a 2025 drama film, co-written, co-produced, and directed by Shih-Ching Tsou. It stars Janel Tsai, Ma Shih-Yuan, Nina Ye, Brando Huang, Akio Chen and Xin-Yan Chao. Sean Baker serves as co-writer, co-producer, and editor.

The film had its world premiere at the Critics' Week section of the 2025 Cannes Film Festival on May 15. It was released theatrically in France on September 17, 2025 and in the United States in a limited release on November 14, before streaming on Netflix on November 28. It was selected as the Taiwanese entry for Best International Feature Film at the 98th Academy Awards, making the December shortlist.

== Plot ==
A single mother, Shu-Fen moves with her two daughters—innocent 5-year-old I-Jing and surly, university-aged I-Ann—to Taipei to start a noodle stand at a night market, while I-Ann works at a betel nut stand as a betel nut beauty to earn money. After discovering that her estranged husband is terminally ill, Shu-Fen puts herself further into debt to pay for his medical bills and funeral, which disgusts I-Ann and drives a further wedge between mother and daughter as Shu-Fen becomes unable to pay rent for the noodle stand. Meanwhile, reuniting with her grandparents Wen-Xong Chen and Xue-Mei Wu, the left-handed I-Jing is informed by her old-fashioned grandfather that the left hand is "the devil's hand" and that she is forbidden from using it in his home. Misinterpreting the superstition, I-Jing believes that she is not responsible for any bad behavior done using her left hand, and begins to shoplift from the other market stands.

When I-Ann is invited to a party at a motel with an old local classmate, it is revealed that she had been a straight-A student and the most popular girl on campus, but had to drop out of high school for reasons I-Ann claims were financial. After others at the party mock her with crude sexual advances, she storms out. I-Ann is also in a sexual relationship with her boss, A-Ming, whose wife eventually discovers the relationship and confronts I-Ann at work. I-Ann reveals she is pregnant with A-Ming's baby and quits.

I-Jing, while playing with the pet meerkat willed to the family by Shu-Fen's deceased husband, throws a ball with her left hand, leading to the meerkat falling off the apartment balcony and dying. Distressed and guilty, I-Jing blames "the devil's hand." Later, Shu-Fen visits her mother's home to beg for money, but Xue-Mei refuses. Xue-Mei is secretly involved in a black-market illegal-immigration operation, and I-Jing, oblivious to the crimes but aware that the passports are valuable, steals them from Xue-Mei's home as the women argue, inadvertently saving Xue-Mei from a later raid by immigration agents. When I-Jing attempts to pawn the passports, the shop owner contacts the family home, and I-Ann collects her and learns of I-Jing's belief in her "devil hand" and shoplifting. I-Ann convinces I-Jing that the superstition is false, assures that the meerkat's death was an accident, and takes I-Jing to return the stolen items and atone. As thanks for I-Jing's actions involving the passports, Xue-Mei gifts Shu-Fen the money to pay for the noodle stand.

The family attends a birthday banquet for Xue-Mei's sixtieth birthday. A-Ming, who has been attempting to contact I-Ann without success, arrives with his wife after deducing her location, and his wife loudly reveals I-Ann's affair and pregnancy in front of the scandalized extended family, insisting that they will pay for the baby if it is a male. I-Ann retorts that she miscarried the child, leading to a fight with Shu-Fen, who is ashamed of I-Ann's behavior and failure to take responsibility. The couple is thrown out, but I-Ann drinks heavily, and eventually reveals their family secret: I-Jing is her own daughter, not Shu-Fen's, and Shu-Fen had covered up the truth in order to give her daughter a better chance at marital prospects. Xue-Mei is outraged, but the moment is cathartic for Shu-Fen and I-Ann.

The film ends with I-Ann choosing to work at the noodle stand with her family, and she and I-Jing beginning a foundation of their relationship as mother and daughter.

== Cast ==
- Janel Tsai as Shu-Fen
- Ma Shih-Yuan as I-Ann
- Nina Ye as I-Jing
- Brando Huang as Johnny
- Akio Chen as Wen-Xong Chen
- Xin-Yan Chao as Xue-Mei Wu
- Teng-Hung Hsia as A-Ming

== Production ==
The script for the film was written by Shih-Ching Tsou and Sean Baker in 2010. In November 2012, Baker revealed the project, with Shih-Ching Tsou set to direct, however, the film was facing difficulty to secure financing.

Principal photography began in July 2022. By February 2025, the film was nearing the end of post-production. The film was shot using an iPhone.

== Release ==
Left-Handed Girl had its world premiere at the 2025 Cannes Film Festival in the Critics' Week section where it won the Gan Foundation Award for Distribution. In May 2025, Netflix acquired rights to the film for the world excluding the Baltics, the Benelux, Greece, Hong Kong, Israel, Italy, France, Japan, South Korea, Spain, Scandinavia, Poland and Taiwan. It also screened in the Competition section of the 30th Busan International Film Festival on September 22, 2025 for 'Bosan Awards', the 'Official Section' of the 70th Valladolid International Film Festival, the 69th BFI London Film Festival on October 15, 2025, and the 20th Rome Film Festival, where it won Best Film.

It was released in the United States in a limited release on November 14, 2025, before it began streaming on Netflix on November 28, 2025.

In August 2025, Taiwan's Ministry of Culture submitted Left-Handed Girl to compete for the Academy Award for Best International Feature category at the 98th Academy Awards.

== Reception ==
=== Critical response ===
On the review aggregator website Rotten Tomatoes, 98% of 108 critics' reviews are positive, with an average rating of 8.1/10. The website's consensus reads: "A warm tour through Taipei distinguished by its lived-in cultural specificity and relatable family dynamics, Left-Handed Girl is a winning first solo feature from writer-director Shih-Ching Tsou." Metacritic, which uses a weighted average, assigned the film a score of 77 out of 100, based on 18 critics, indicating "generally favorable" reviews.

=== Accolades ===
Award	Date of ceremony	Category	Recipient(s)	Result	Ref.
Cannes Film Festival	May 24, 2025	Critics' Week Grand Prix	Shih-Ching Tsou	Nominated	
Cannes Film Festival	May 24, 2025	Gan Foundation Award for Distribution	Shih-Ching Tsou	Won	
Zurich Film Festival	October 4, 2025	Golden Eye Feature Film Competition – Special Mention	Left-Handed Girl	Won	
Montclair Film Festival	October 19, 2025	Breakthrough Director	Shih-Ching Tsou	Honored	
Rome Film Festival	October 26, 2025	Progressive Cinema Competition – Best Film	Left-Handed Girl	Won	
Valladolid International Film Festival	November 1, 2025	Golden Spike	Left-Handed Girl	Nominated	
Stockholm International Film Festival	November 14, 2025	Best Actress	Ma Shih-Yuan	Won	
Asian World Film Festival	November 20, 2025	Snow Leopard Award for Rising Star	Nina Ye	Won	
Asian World Film Festival	November 20, 2025	Snow Leopard Audience Award	Left-Handed Girl	Won	
Golden Horse Awards	November 22, 2025	Best Narrative Feature	Left-Handed Girl	Nominated	
Golden Horse Awards	November 22, 2025	Best Supporting Actor	Brando Huang	Nominated	
Golden Horse Awards	November 22, 2025	Best Supporting Actress	Janel Tsai	Nominated	
Golden Horse Awards	November 22, 2025	Best Supporting Actress	Nina Ye	Nominated	
Golden Horse Awards	November 22, 2025	Best Original Screenplay	Shih-Ching Tsou, Sean Baker	Nominated	
Golden Horse Awards	November 22, 2025	Best New Director	Shih-Ching Tsou	Nominated	
Golden Horse Awards	November 22, 2025	Best New Performer	Shih-Yuan Ma	Won	
Golden Horse Awards	November 22, 2025	Best Film Editing	Sean Baker	Nominated	
Golden Horse Awards	November 22, 2025	Best Cinematography	Chen Ko-chin, Kao Tzu-hao	Nominated	
Washington D.C. Area Film Critics Association	December 7, 2025	Best Foreign Language Film	Left-Handed Girl	Nominated	
Washington D.C. Area Film Critics Association	December 7, 2025	Best Youth Performance	Nina Ye	Nominated	
San Diego Film Critics Society	December 15, 2025	Best Foreign Language Film	Left-Handed Girl	Nominated	
San Diego Film Critics Society	December 15, 2025	Best Youth Performance	Nina Ye	Nominated	
Las Vegas Film Critics Society	December 19, 2025	Best International Film	Left-Handed Girl	Nominated	
Las Vegas Film Critics Society	December 19, 2025	Best Female Youth Performance	Nina Ye	Won	
Critics' Choice Movie Awards	January 4, 2026	Best Foreign Language Film	Left-Handed Girl	Nominated	
Critics' Choice Movie Awards	January 4, 2026	Best Young Performer	Nina Ye	Nominated	
Taipei Film Awards	July 12, 2026	Best Editing	Left Handed Girl	Won	

== See also ==
- List of submissions to the 98th Academy Awards for Best International Feature Film
- List of Taiwanese submissions for the Academy Award for Best International Feature Film
