= Bree Elrod =

American actress

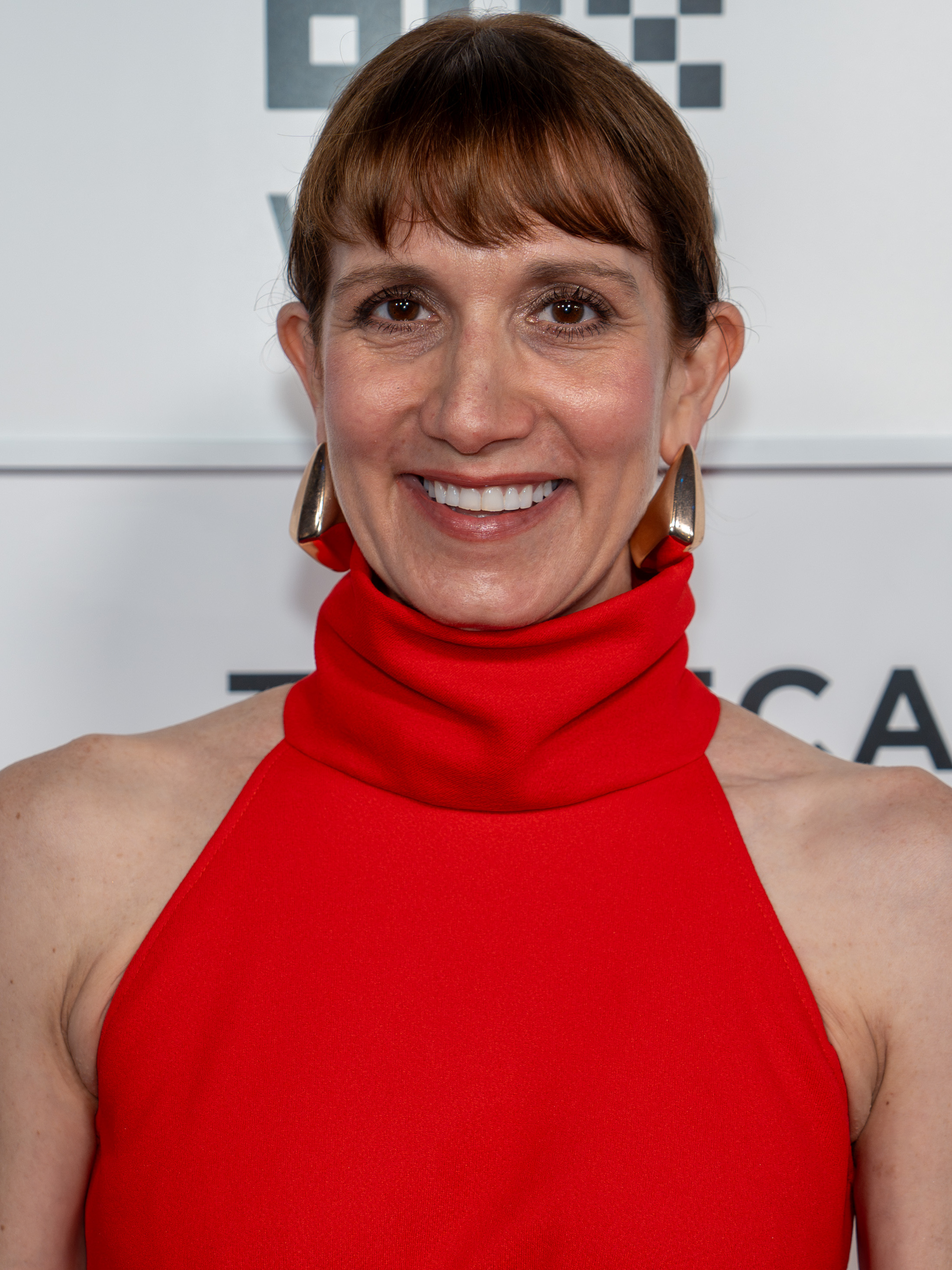
Bree Elrod during the Tow premiere at the 2025 Tribeca Festival

Bree Elrod is an American actress known for playing Lexi in the 2021 Sean Baker film Red Rocket.

In 2006, she appeared in an Off-Broadway production of My Name Is Rachel Corrie, which was directed by Alan Rickman.

Elrod is from Topeka, Kansas. She is a 1996 graduate of Topeka High School, where she was homecoming queen. She is an NYU graduate. As of December 2021, she is based in Brooklyn.

== Personal life ==
In an interview with The Topeka Capital-Journal, Elrod was asked if she was in a relationship. She replied, “I am not married. Let's just say that.”

== Filmography ==
=== Film ===
Year	Title	Role	Notes
2010	Shutter Island	Female Patient	
2013	Dark Feed	M.G.	
2015	Dysopticon	Robyn	Short film
2021	Red Rocket	Lexi	
2023	Sometimes I Think About Dying	Amelia	
2025	Tow	Lorraine	
2025	O’Dessa	Calliope Galloway	
TBA	Keep It Open	Eve	Short film

=== Television ===
Year	Title	Role	Notes
2022	A Friend of the Family	Jennifer Ferguson	Miniseries; 3 episodes
