= Nina Ye =

Taiwanese actress (born 2016)

- 葉子綺
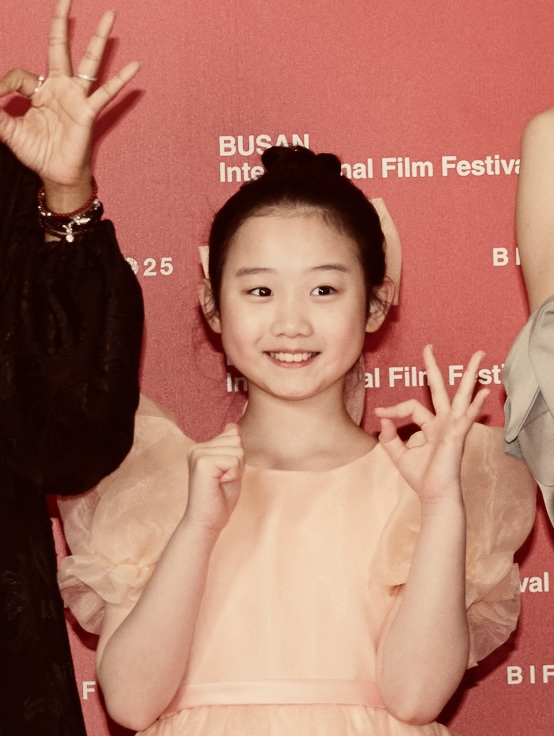
- Ye in 2025
- Born: April 19, 2016 (age 10)
- Occupation: Actress

Nina Ye (Chinese: 葉子綺, born 19 April 2016) is a Taiwanese child actress. She began her acting career in 2020 after appearing in her first advertising commercial work. Her credits include the TV dramas Rainless Love in a Godless Land (2021) and The Cleaner (2024), where Nina was nominated for Best Newcomer at the 2025 Golden Bell Awards, as well as the feature films The Post-Truth World (2022) and I am the Secret in Your Heart (2024). As of 2026, her most recent project is the family drama Left Handed Girl, written and directed by Shih-Ching Tsou and co-starring Janel Tsai and Shih-Yuan Ma. The film was selected as Taiwan's official submission for Best International Feature Film at the 98th Academy Awards, making the December shortlist, and was showcased as one of AWFF's Centerpiece screenings.

== Filmography ==
=== Movie ===
Year	Title	Role	Ref
2022	The Post-Truth World	young Liu Zhen-zhen	
2023	Kiss My Ass Boss	young Emma	
2024	I Am the Secret in Your Heart	little girl	
2025	Penguin Girl	young Moon	
2025	Left-handed girl	I-Jing	
2026	PaPaGo	Young Two-Two	

=== Television ===
Year	Title	Role	Ref
2021	The Arc of Life	young Gongye, Xiaoniao	
2021	Rainless Love in a Godless Land	Chan ai yu	
2024	Haunted House for Sale	little Love	
2024	The Floating Generation	La.	
2024	The Cleaner	Le Le Chan	
2024	Who's the Boss	Chang Yi-yi	
2024	The Romance of Mr. Science	Ke-ching	
2025	Tabloid	Xuan-xuan	
2025	Father Dean	Chao Ting	
2025	The Good, the Bad, and the Ugly	Miao-miao	
2025	Keeping Mum	Cassie Wen (young)	
2025	Oops! I'm in Jail	Hsiao Chi	
2025	Had I Not Seen the Sun	Hsiao Yao Tzu	
2026	Bloody Smart	Little Zhao Jiaqi	
2026	Lai! jin lai hao!	Little Xiao Zhao Yixuan	
2026	The Fame	Kuan-Hao's Younger Sister	
2026	Addicted	Chiu Hsiao-ying (8-year-old)	

=== MV ===
Year	Title	Ref
2022	Xiao Yu「無視生非」"Nothing To See"	
2023	JJ Lin「自畫像」"Self Portrait"	
2026	Solar (singer)「總有一顆屬於你的星球」	
2026	Yuki Hsu「幸好」	
2026	831「如果我在明天就會離開」	

== Awards and nominations ==
Year	Award	Category	Recipient	Role	Result	Ref
2025	60th Golden Bell Awards	Most Promising Newcomer Award in Mini-Series (TV Movies)	The Cleaner	陳以樂	Nominated	
2025	Asian World Film Festival	Snow Leopard Award for Rising Star	Left-Handed Girl	I-Jing	Won	
2025	62nd Golden Horse Awards	Best Supporting Actress	Left-Handed Girl	I-Jing	Nominated	
2025	The 2nd LINE TODAY Spotlight Awards	Film Shiner of the Year	Left-Handed Girl	I-Jing	Nominated	
2025	24th Washington, D.C. Film Critics Association Awards	Best Young Actor	Left-Handed Girl	I-Jing	Nominated	
2025	30th San Diego Film Critics Association Awards	Best Youth Performance	Left-Handed Girl	I-Jing	Nominated	
2025	Las Vegas Film Critics Society	Best Female Youth Performance	Left-Handed Girl	I-Jing	Won	
2026	Critics' Choice Movie Awards	Best Young Performer	Left-Handed Girl	I-Jing	Nominated	
2026	37th Palm Springs International Film Festival	Best Actress	Left-Handed Girl	I-Jing	Won	
2026	Girls on Film Awards	Ensemble Cast Award	Left-Handed Girl	I-Jing	Nominated	
2026	MOEMAC Award	Best breaking through performers	Left-Handed Girl	I-Jing	Nominated	
2026	Music City Film Critics' Association	Best Young Actress	Left-Handed Girl	I-Jing	Nominated	
2026	The 2025 Online Film & Television Association (OFTA)	Best Youth Performance	Left-Handed Girl	I-Jing	Nominated	
2026	The 2025 Latino Entertainment Journalists Association (LEJA)	Best Youth Performance	Left-Handed Girl	I-Jing	Nominated	
2026	IFSCA Awards	Best Youth Performance	Left-Handed Girl	I-Jing	Nominated	
2026	Taipei Film Awards	Best New Actor	Left-Handed Girl	I-Jing	Nominated	
