= Shih-Ching Tsou =

Taiwanese film producer

- 鄒時擎
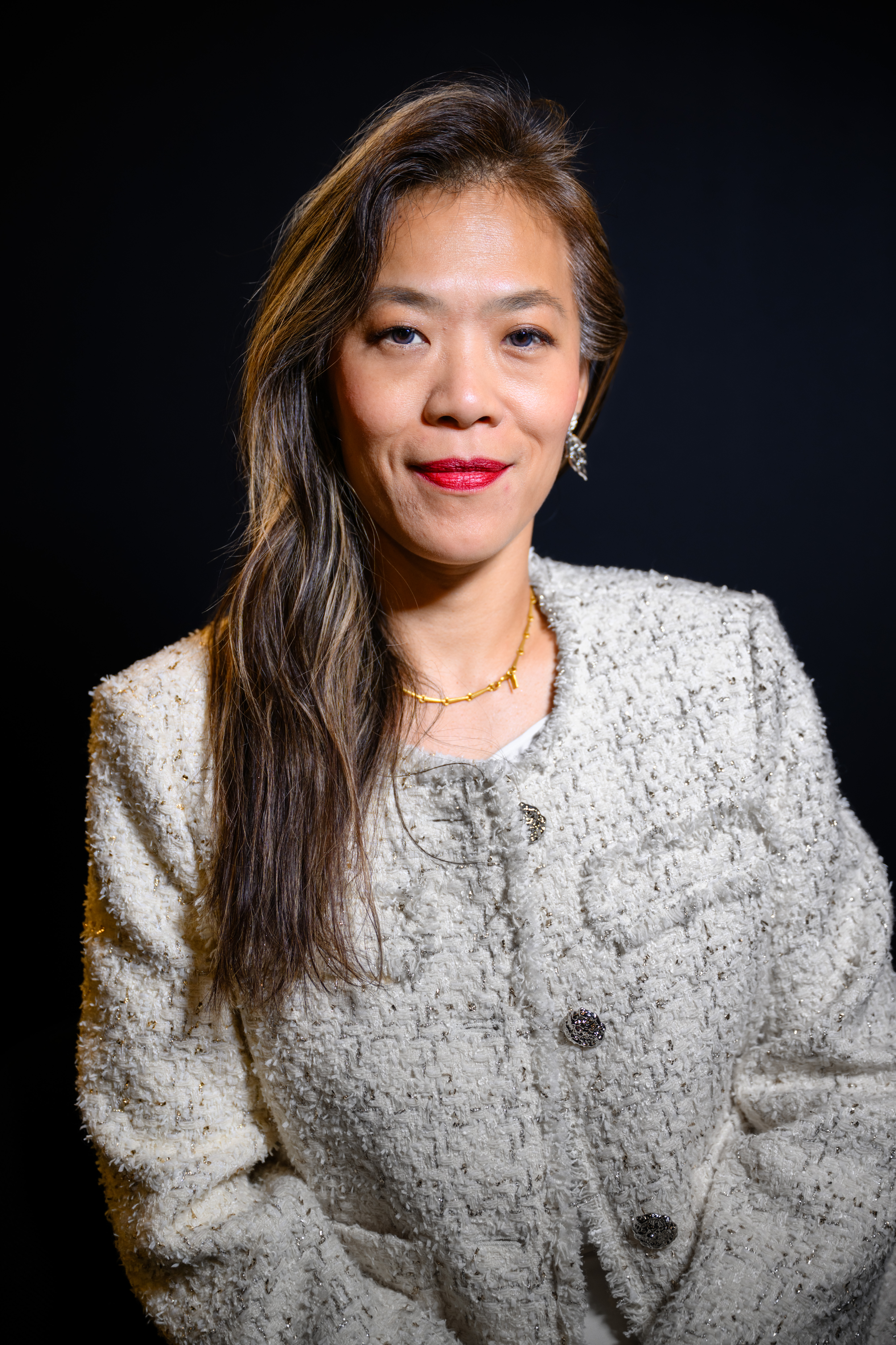
- Tsou in 2025
- Born: Taipei, Taiwan
- Citizenship: Taiwan, USA
- Education: Fu Jen Catholic University (BA); The New School (MA)
- Occupations: Film producer; director; writer; editor; actress
- Years active: 2004–present

Chinese name
- Traditional Chinese: 鄒時擎
Transcriptions
Standard Mandarin
- Hanyu Pinyin: Zōu Shí-Qíng
- IPA: [tsóʊ ʂǐ.tɕʰǐŋ]
Yue: Cantonese
- Jyutping: Zau1 Si4-King4
- IPA: [tsɐw˥ si˩.kʰɪŋ˩]
Southern Min
- Hokkien POJ: Tsou Sî-Khêng

Shih-Ching Tsou (Chinese: 鄒時擎) is a Taiwanese-American film producer, director, and actress.

She directed the 2025 film Left-Handed Girl, which premiered at Cannes (Critics' Week) and was selected as Taiwan's Academy International Feature Award candidate for 2026 and Shortlisted.

She co-directed the film Take Out (2004) with Sean Baker. She also produced Baker's other films Starlet (2012), Tangerine (2015), The Florida Project (2017), and Red Rocket (2021).

== Early life and education ==
Tsou was born and raised in Taipei, Taiwan. After graduating from Fu Jen Catholic University, Tsou came to New York City for her master's degree in Media Studies at The New School.

== Career ==
Tsou has described her entry into filmmaking as largely unplanned, noting in interviews that she “fell into” the field rather than initially aspiring to become a producer or director. After meeting filmmaker Sean Baker, the two developed a shared interest in creating works that were “true to life,” drawing inspiration from the aesthetics and ethos of the Dogme 95 movement. Their collaborations were shaped by a desire to explore unfamiliar environments and present them to audiences with a sense of discovery.

Tsou's first film was Take Out, which she co-directed, co-wrote, and co-produced with Sean Baker. The film had its world premiere at the Slamdance Film Festival in 2004, then went on to screen at the Nashville Film Festival where it won the grand jury prize. It was released in a limited release in the United States on June 6, 2008. In 2009, it was nominated for the Independent Spirit John Cassavetes Award. Take Out had a 4K digital restoration release on Bluray by The Criterion Collection in 2022.

Tsou went on to work with Baker on his third film, Starlet, as an executive producer and costume designer. The film had its world premiere at SXSW on March 11, 2012. The film was released in a limited release on September 9, 2012 by Music Box Films. Tsou along with Baker and the ensemble cast were given the Independent Spirit Robert Altman Award in 2013.

Baker and Tsou collaborated again on Tangerine, where she served as a producer on the film as well as the costume designer, art department, additional camera operator, and made her acting debut in the film. It was filmed completely on iPhone 5s. The film had its world premiere at the 2015 Sundance Film Festival on January 23, 2015. The film had a limited release by Magnolia Pictures on July 10, 2015.

After Tangerine, Tsou produced Baker's next feature The Florida Project. The film premiered in the Directors' Fortnight section of the 2017 Cannes Film Festival and was theatrically released in the United States on October 6, 2017 by A24. It won at least 38 and was nominated for at least 104 awards including an Academy Award for Best Supporting Actor Willem Dafoe (see List of accolades received by The Florida Project).

She produced Baker's feature Red Rocket, which premiered at the 2021 Cannes Film Festival and received rave reviews.

In summer 2022, Tsou began production on her first solo directorial feature, Left-Handed Girl, a family drama set in a night market in Taipei, Taiwan. The film was co-written by frequent collaborator Sean Baker, who also edited the film. It premiered in the Critics’ Week section of the 2025 Cannes Film Festival and was released on Netflix on November 28 to critical acclaim; the government of Taiwan selected it as its submission for Best International Feature Film for the 2026 Oscar awards.

Tsou served as a programmer for the Slamdance Film Festival and was a member of the jury in 2019.

== Style and themes ==
Tsou’s work is characterized by a grounded social-realist approach, frequently focusing on working-class and immigrant communities, the pressures of economic precarity, and the intimate dynamics of family life. Her films commonly employ naturalistic performances, location shooting, and small mobile crews, blending documentary immediacy with narrative fiction.

Take Out

Tsou’s social-realist approach is evident in Take Out, which she co-directed with Sean Baker. The film presents a day-in-the-life portrait of an undocumented Chinese delivery worker attempting to repay a smuggling debt, reflecting her interest in working-class immigrant experiences and economic precarity. Produced for less than US$3,000 and shot on a Sony PD150 with a very small crew and a mix of professional and non-professional actors, the film adopts a handheld, street-level aesthetic influenced by the gritty realism of 1970s New York cinema. Critics have noted that these production choices give the film a documentary-like immediacy and highlight the pressures faced by urban immigrant laborers.”

Left-Handed Girl

Critics noted that Left-Handed Girl centers its narrative on three generations of women, bringing female subjectivity to the forefront of a traditional Taiwanese family structure. Reviews highlighted the film’s vivid depiction of Taipei’s night-market environment, portraying it as a dynamic working-class setting that shapes the characters’ emotional and economic lives. The film blends humor and melodrama to explore intergenerational tensions and the unspoken burdens carried within the household. Critics also emphasized the film’s gentle critique of patriarchal expectations and traditional beliefs, particularly through its depiction of the stigma surrounding left-handedness. The film has been described as drawing on Tsou’s own childhood experiences, developing them into a broader commentary on cultural norms and bodily regulation.

== Awards and nominations ==
Tsou was one of the finalists of 2009 Vilcek Prize for Creative Promise Honoree in Filmmaking.

In 2009, Tsou was nominated for the Independent Spirit John Cassavetes Award as one of the credited producers of Take Out.

In 2013, Tsou, along with director Sean Baker, casting director Julia Kim, and the ensemble cast of Starlet, received the Independent Spirit Robert Altman Award.

In 2021, along with other members of the Red Rocket team, she received the Producer Award at the Hamilton Behind the Camera Awards.

In 2025, Left-Handed Girl won the Gan Foundation Award at the Critics’ Week competition section of the Cannes Film Festival.

== Filmography ==
=== Film ===
Year	Title	Role	Notes
2004	Take Out		Co-director (with Sean Baker), producer, writer, editor
2012	Starlet		Executive producer, costume designer
2015	Tangerine	Mamasan	Producer, costume designer, additional camera operator, cameo
2016	Snowbird		Producer
2017	The Florida Project	Perfume Wholesaler	Producer, cameo
2021	Red Rocket	Ms. Phan	Producer, costume designer, cameo
2025	Left-Handed Girl		Director, writer, producer, editor
