= Red Rocket (film) =

2021 film by Sean Baker

- Theatrical release poster
- Directed by: Sean Baker
- Written by: Sean Baker; Chris Bergoch
- Produced by: Sean Baker; Alex Coco; Samantha Quan; Alex Saks; Shih-Ching Tsou
- Starring: Simon Rex; Bree Elrod; Suzanna Son
- Cinematography: Drew Daniels
- Edited by: Sean Baker
- Production companies: FilmNation Entertainment; Cre Film
- Distributed by: A24 (United States and Canada); Focus Features (Note: Distributed through Universal Pictures; deal excludes France (Le Pacte), Australia and New Zealand (Roadshow Entertainment), and Israel (Lev Cinemas)) (International)
- Release dates: July 14, 2021 (Cannes); December 10, 2021 (United States)
- Running time: 130 minutes
- Country: United States
- Language: English
- Budget: $1.1 million
- Box office: $2.3 million

Red Rocket is a 2021 American black comedy drama film directed by Sean Baker, and written by Baker and Chris Bergoch. It stars Simon Rex, Bree Elrod, and Suzanna Son in her feature film debut. The film stars Rex as a middle-aged, newly retired porn star who leaves Los Angeles for his small Texas hometown, plotting his way back to the life he once had. Along the way, he begins dating a 17-year-old girl.

The film premiered at the 74th Cannes Film Festival in competition for the Palme d'Or on July 14, 2021. It was released in select theaters in the United States on December 10, 2021, by A24. Red Rocket received praise for its direction and Rex's performance and various awards and nominations. The National Board of Review listed it among the top 10 films of the year. Rex also won Best Actor awards from the Los Angeles Film Critics Association and the Independent Spirit Awards.

== Plot ==
Washed-up and down-on-his-luck L. A. pornstar Mikey "Saber" Davies returns to his hometown of Texas City, Texas, for the first time in 17 years to start over. After a two-day bus ride and only $22 on him, he arrives at the modest home of his estranged wife and fellow ex-pornstar, Lexi, and her mother, Lil, begging them to let him stay. They reluctantly agree, but insist that he get a job and do household chores. Mikey has several job interviews, but due to the long gap in his résumé and his fame as an adult film actor, nobody hires him. Desperate, he reaches out to Leondria, the mother of a schoolmate, to give him back his old job selling cannabis. Leondria and her daughter June suspect that Mikey will smoke it himself, but their business arrangement continues after he returns with his earnings. Since he has no car, Mikey uses Lexi's kids' old bicycle.

After sleeping on the couch for several nights, Mikey starts having sex with Lexi. Eventually, she invites him to share her bedroom. Mikey gives Lexi and Lil a month's rent in advance and takes them to a donut shop to celebrate. He becomes smitten with Raylee, a 17-year-old girl who works at the counter and goes by the name Strawberry. He returns and shares a joint with her, and she recommends he consider the construction workers who frequent the shop as customers. They start a sexual relationship. One night, she plays him a piano version of "Bye Bye Bye" by NSYNC.

Mikey befriends Lexi's neighbor Lonnie, whom Lexi babysat when he was younger. They spend time together. During a trip to the mall, Mikey learns that Lonnie is pretending to be an Army veteran to sell US flags and gets humiliated and thrown into the mall fountain by two actual veterans, who see through him.

Mikey persuades Strawberry to break up with Nash, a classmate with whom she has been having casual sex. Nash and his parents confront Mikey in the donut shop parking lot and beat him up.

Mikey repeatedly tries to persuade Strawberry to travel with him to Los Angeles to pursue a career in pornography, which he plans to manage as his way back into the business. They grow closer, causing him to become distant from Lexi. When he disappears for a weekend with Strawberry, Lexi grows suspicious and they argue. Mikey berates her and brags about the $3,000 he made selling drugs.

While riding in Lonnie's car, Mikey brags about his success with Strawberry and his comeback, which distracts Lonnie and makes him almost miss their exit, causing them to swerve across traffic, creating a multiple-vehicle collision that results in many injuries. They flee the scene and Mikey begs Lonnie to hide his involvement. Mikey is anxious, but Lonnie assumes full responsibility for the crash when he is arrested.

Using the crash as an excuse, Mikey visits Strawberry at work and asks her to come to Los Angeles with him and start her porn career. She agrees and quits her job. That evening, before going to bed, Mikey tells Lexi he is leaving for California in the morning.

Later that night, while Mikey is sleeping, Lexi and Lil call Leondria to send her adult children, June and her brothers, to seize the $3,000 Mikey earned. They wake him and take the money. Mikey flees out the bedroom window and runs naked to Leondria's house, begging her to return his money. He realizes that all this time, Leondria has been keeping an eye on him for Lexi and Lil. She gives Mikey $200 for a bus ticket and tells him to leave town forever, and that if he is still there by tomorrow or ever comes back, he will be beaten up.

Humiliated, Mikey leaves with his few possessions in a trash bag. After walking to Strawberry's house all night, he reaches it in the morning, dehydrated and exhausted. Upon arriving, he imagines Strawberry opening the door in a red bikini and dancing, and tears up.

== Cast ==
- Simon Rex as Mikey "Saber" Davies
- Bree Elrod as Lexi Davies
- Suzanna Son as Strawberry / Raylee
- Brenda Deiss as Lil
- Judy Hill as Leondria
- Brittney Rodriguez as June
- Ethan Darbone as Lonnie
- Shih-Ching Tsou as Ms. Phan
- Parker Bigham as Nash Parker

== Production ==
The $1.1 million budget the film was able to secure forced Baker to abandon a larger project and devote himself to Red Rocket. He and Bergoch conceived the idea for the Saber character while researching the adult film industry for their 2012 film Starlet, when they met several men who fit the archetype of a "suitcase pimp", which Baker defines as "male talent who lives off a female talent in the adult film world."

Baker had Simon Rex in mind five years before shooting, but had never introduced himself. On October 23, 2020, Baker called Rex and convinced him to send an audition tape via iPhone, giving him just five minutes to prepare. Rex drove to Texas to avoid postflight quarantine rules relating to the COVID-19 pandemic, as filming was to begin in three days. In the Hollywood Reporter, David Rooney called Rex's casting a "winking joke" because Rex had made solo masturbation videos for a gay pornography company before establishing himself in his career. Baker asked Rex to trust him, and Rex did not tell his agent about the film until after shooting had ended. Baker first approached Suzanna Son in 2018 after a screening of Don't Worry, He Won't Get Far on Foot 10 days after she moved to Los Angeles, then did not call her for two years. Darbone was a waiter at a restaurant in Nederland when Baker approached him because he "liked his look". Rodriguez, who had been a regular at the Donut Hole location was near the plant she worked at before she was laid off, was walking her dog when Baker pulled over to ask her to audition.

Principal photography ran in Texas from October 26 to November 19, 2020, with rigorous safety protocols implemented due to the pandemic. Red Rocket was shot on 16 mm film by an Arriflex 16SR3 camera with Panavision 1.44x Auto Panatars, Zeiss Super Speed, Iscorama 54 and Canon Lenses. It had a crew of 10 people, no rehearsal time, and mostly non-actors.

Filming locations included restaurants in Texas City and Nederland, a donut shop in Groves, the Kemah Boardwalk, and the Galveston Island Historic Pleasure Pier. The Donut Hole was open for business in the morning while filming took place in the evening.

Securing the rights to the song "Bye Bye Bye" was not part of the initial budget. All five members of NSYNC had to approve its use. Son recorded a cover version of the song for the soundtrack.

== Creative influences ==
Baker has said he "devoted my career to tell stories that remove stigma and normalize lifestyles" of sex workers. He said that in Red Rocket he wanted to pay homage to "Italian eroticism" and sexploitation films by directors from the 1970s like Fernando Di Leo and Umberto Lenzi. He was also inspired by Steven Spielberg's The Sugarland Express for the outdoor scenes.

== Release ==
A24 acquired distribution rights to the film in the United States and Canada in February 2021. FilmNation Entertainment later sold international distribution rights to Le Pacte for France, Roadshow Entertainment for Australia and New Zealand, Lev Cinemas for Israel, and Focus Features and Universal Pictures International elsewhere excluding the U.S. and Canada.

Red Rocket had its world premiere in competition at the 74th Cannes Film Festival on July 14, 2021, where it received a five-minute standing ovation. It also screened at film festivals in Deauville, Hamburg, London, Mill Valley, Miskolc, New York, Telluride, Rome, Nagpur, San Sebastián and Vancouver.

A drive-in screening was scheduled as part of Travis Scott's Astroworld Festival featuring appearances by Baker, Scott, and the film's cast. In the aftermath of a mass casualty event at Scott's concert three days earlier, the event was canceled.

The film had a limited theatrical release on December 10, 2021, beginning in New York and Los Angeles. Lionsgate released the film on VOD on February 8, 2022, and on DVD and Blu-Ray on March 15, 2022.

== Reception ==
=== Box office ===
Red Rocket grossed $1 million in the United States and Canada and $1.3 million in other territories for a worldwide total of $2.3 million, plus 477,304 with home video sales, against a production budget of $1.1 million. In its opening weekend, the film earned $88,195 from six theaters for a per-screen average of $14,699.

=== Critical response ===
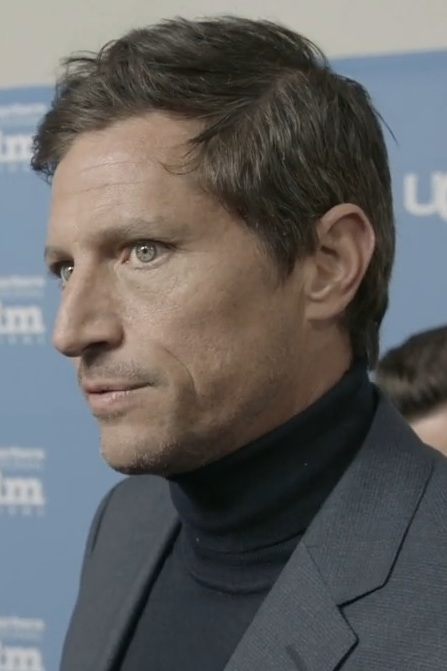
Rex's performance received critical acclaim.

On the review aggregator website Rotten Tomatoes, 90% of 206 critics' reviews are positive, with an average rating of 7.9/10. The website's consensus reads: "Led by Simon Rex's magnetic performance, Red Rocket is another vibrant, ground-level look at modern American life from director/co-writer Sean Baker." Metacritic, which uses a weighted average, assigned the film a score of 76 out of 100, based on 49 critics, indicating "generally favorable" reviews.

In Deadline Hollywood, Todd McCarthy wrote, "Even before much happens, the sense of a very specific location and cultural mindset is very intense." He praised Baker and Rex for their "tremendous energy" and said the film "feels as creatively pure as a novel by a kid just out of college." Matt Zoller Seitz of RogerEbert.com, on the other hand, called it a "rambling 130-minute film" and the middle section "wherein Mikey ensnares [the] freckle-faced 17-year-old donut shop employee... Strawberry" and schemes their escape to Los Angeles so that he can lead her to adult film stardom "one-note and repetitious". David Rooney of The Hollywood Reporter also criticized the film mildly for "prolix stretches", saying "it could have used some tightening. But it's a pleasure to put yourself in Baker's capable hands." Peter Bradshaw of The Guardian wrote, "With Red Rocket, Sean Baker has given us an adult American pastoral, essentially a comedy, and another study of tough lives at the margin, close in spirit to his lo-fi breakthrough Tangerine." Richard Lawson in Vanity Fair wrote, "Baker's choice is a rather perfect one—in contextual terms and actual ones, too. Rex's performance is fleet and nimble, gregarious and shaded in darkness. He and Baker make staccato music together."

Some reactions to the film stirred a debate about sexual morality in film in the post-MeToo era. Seitz concluded that Red Rocket is "the least of the list" of Baker's and Bergoch's "impressive library of realistic movies about the rainbow coalition of the American underclass" and questioned moments where "if the filmmakers aren't exactly endorsing their protagonist's middle-aged, borderline pedo-pimp obsession with Strawberry, they're not being as rigorous about mediating it as they should." In Gawker, Brianna Zigler defended the film's portrayal of a morally objectionable protagonist:

[T]he world is not a comfortable place, and it's often rigged in favor of guys like Mikey Saber. No matter how much of a cancerous loser we know him to be, his inflated sense of self is so grand that his losses still translate into wins. Is Mikey the sort of person I would like to be? No, but he's worth thinking about, and even trying to understand because he exists in this world with the rest of us. There is no moral high ground to be gained from disavowing art which dares to contend with the fact that people are not perfect bastions of moral good; that we can align ourselves with ugliness because ugliness exists in us all. If Mikey Saber gets off too easy for you, it's because he'd probably get away with it in real life.

Variety's Clayton Davis said the film's "risqué" subject matter could be a hindrance but encouraged award voters to nominate Rex, Baker, and Bergoch for Academy Awards. John Waters included Red Rocket on his list of the Top Ten films of 2021. Filmmaker Bette Gordon praised the film, saying that it "flows organically due to Sean Baker's love of discovering place and his desire to listen to the voices of the community of people who live there."

In June 2025, IndieWire ranked the film 68th on its list of "The 100 Best Movies of the 2020s (So Far)."

== Accolades ==
Award	Date of Ceremony	Category	Recipient(s)	Result	Ref
Cannes Film Festival	July 16, 2021	Palm Dog Award	Sophie the Dog	Won	
Cannes Film Festival	July 17, 2021	Palme d'Or	Sean Baker	Nominated	
Deauville American Film Festival	September 11, 2021	Prix du Jury	Red Rocket	Won	
Deauville American Film Festival	September 11, 2021	Critic's Award	Red Rocket	Won	
Mill Valley Film Festival	October 9, 2021	MVFF Award	Simon Rex	Awarded	
Newport Beach Film Festival	October 24, 2021	Breakout Performance Award	Simon Rex	Awarded	
SCAD Savannah Film Festival	October 26, 2021	Spotlight Award	Simon Rex	Won	
Gotham Awards	November 29, 2021	Outstanding Lead Performance	Simon Rex	Nominated	
Gotham Awards	November 29, 2021	Best Screenplay	Sean Baker and Chris Bergoch	Nominated	
Gotham Awards	November 29, 2021	Breakthrough Performer	Suzanna Son	Nominated	
National Board of Review	December 2, 2021	Top Ten Film	Red Rocket	Won	
Detroit Film Critics Society	December 6, 2021	Best Director	Sean Baker	Nominated	
Chicago Film Critics Association	December 15, 2021	Best Original Screenplay	Sean Baker and Chris Bergoch	Nominated	
Alliance of Women Film Journalists		Most Egregious Lovers' Age Difference	Simon Rex and Suzanna Son	Nominated	
Los Angeles Film Critics Association	December 18, 2021	Best Actor	Simon Rex	Won	
National Society of Film Critics	January 8, 2022	Best Actor	Simon Rex	Runner-up	
Houston Film Critics Society	January 19, 2022	Texas Independent Film Award	Red Rocket	Won	
Santa Barbara International Film Festival	March 5, 2022	Virtuoso Award	Simon Rex	Awarded	
Independent Spirit Awards	March 6, 2022	Best Male Lead	Simon Rex	Won	
Independent Spirit Awards	March 6, 2022	Best Supporting Female	Suzanna Son	Nominated	

Red Rocket was ineligible for Screen Actors Guild Award nominations.
