= The Florida Project =

2017 film by Sean Baker

- Theatrical release poster
- Directed by: Sean Baker
- Written by: Sean Baker; Chris Bergoch
- Produced by: Sean Baker; Chris Bergoch; Shih-Ching Tsou; Andrew Duncan; Alex Saks; Kevin Chinoy; Francesca Silvestri
- Starring: Willem Dafoe; Brooklynn Kimberly Prince; Bria Vinaite; Valeria Cotto; Christopher Rivera; Caleb Landry Jones
- Cinematography: Alexis Zabé
- Edited by: Sean Baker
- Production companies: Cre Film; Freestyle Picture Company; Cinereach; June Pictures
- Distributed by: A24
- Release dates: May 22, 2017 (Cannes); October 6, 2017 (United States)
- Running time: 111 minutes
- Country: United States
- Language: English
- Budget: $2 million
- Box office: $11.3 million

The Florida Project is a 2017 American drama film directed by Sean Baker, written by Baker and Chris Bergoch, and starring Bria Vinaite in her film debut, Brooklynn Prince, and Willem Dafoe, with Valeria Cotto, Christopher Rivera, and Caleb Landry Jones in supporting roles. It was many of the cast members' first film appearance. The slice of life plot focuses on the summertime adventures of a six-year-old girl who lives with her unemployed single mother in a budget motel in Kissimmee, Florida. Their struggle to make ends meet and stave off homelessness takes place in a realistic environment near Walt Disney World, which was code-named "The Florida Project" during its planning stages. It juxtaposes this with the local residents' less glamorous day-to-day lives and the children's joyful adventures as they explore and make the most of their surroundings while remaining as blissfully ignorant as possible of the hardships their adult parents face.

The film premiered in the Directors' Fortnight section of the 2017 Cannes Film Festival, and was released theatrically in the United States by A24 on October 6, 2017. It was acclaimed by critics, who praised the performances and Baker's direction; Vinaite earned particular acclaim for her performance. Prince's work earned her a Critics' Choice Movie Award for Best Young Performer, while Dafoe was judged to have given "his finest performance in recent memory", receiving Best Supporting Actor nods at the Academy Awards, Golden Globes, SAG Awards, Critics Choice Awards, and BAFTA Awards.

Both the National Board of Review and the American Film Institute named The Florida Project one of the top ten films of the year.

== Plot ==
Moonee, a six-year-old girl, lives with her young, single mother, Halley, at Magic Castle Inn and Suites, a budget motel in Kissimmee, Florida, near Walt Disney World. Moonee spends most of her summer days unsupervised and making mischief with her downstairs neighbor, Scooty (whom Halley is supposed to watch while his mother, Ashley, works as a waitress at a diner), and Dicky, who lives at the nearby Futureland Inn. After Stacy, a new Futureland resident, catches the trio spitting on her car, Dicky is grounded for a week, and Moonee and Scooty meet and befriend Stacy's granddaughter, Jancey, who lives with Stacy.

Halley has recently lost her job as a stripper after refusing to have sex with clients, but this now affects her eligibility for TANF benefits; she begins relying on food that Ashley obtains from work. Struggling to pay rent, Halley begins selling knockoff perfume to tourists in the parking lots of upscale hotels with Moonee's help. Meanwhile, Moonee and Scooty show Jancey around the neighborhood and teach her things, like how to get ice cream by begging for money. They regularly inconvenience Bobby, the Magic Castle's manager, once shutting off the motel's power. Despite this, he remains protective of them. Bobby's duties include preparing expense reports, ejecting drug dealers, and doing repairs; he sometimes enlists the help of his son, Jack, with whom he has a tenuous relationship.

After Dicky's family moves to New Orleans, Scooty finds a lighter in a box that Dicky's family left behind; he, Moonee, and Jancey start a fire at an abandoned condominium complex. Seeing the fire, Ashley figures out that Scooty was involved, and forbids him from hanging out with Moonee or Jancey; she also severs ties with Halley and Moonee.

Without the free food from Ashley, and with security guards beginning to bother her at the hotels, Halley's financial situation declines even further. She begins soliciting sex work online, keeping Moonee in the bathroom with loud music when she has a client over. When Halley steals a client's Disney World MagicBands to scalp them, he returns to demand them back. Bobby scares him off but applies restrictions on unregistered guests in Halley's room; he also warns her that he will evict her if she continues having clients over. In desperation, Halley approaches Ashley to apologize and ask for money. Ashley criticizes Halley for doing sex work and threatens to kill her if her son was ever exposed to Halley's prostitution; enraged, Halley viciously beats her in front of Scooty.

Soon afterward, DCF investigators show up and question Halley and Moonee separately about their lifestyle. In anticipation of another visit, Halley gives her weed to one of the housekeepers and has Moonee help clean their room. They go to a fancier hotel and have an extravagant meal, which Halley charges to a guest's room. When they return to Magic Castle, the investigators, having found evidence of Halley's sex work, are waiting with two police officers to take Moonee into foster care while they finish their inquiry. Not fully understanding what is happening, Moonee asks to say goodbye to Scooty, who lets slip that she is going to a new family. Upset, Moonee runs away from the investigators to bid Jancey goodbye. Seeing her friend's distress, Jancey grabs Moonee's hand and the two run away to Walt Disney World's Magic Kingdom theme park.

== Cast ==
- Willem Dafoe as Bobby Hicks, the manager of Magic Castle
- Brooklynn Kimberly Prince as Moonee, a six-year-old girl
- Bria Vinaite as Halley, Moonee's mother
- Valeria Cotto as Jancey, Moonee's new friend
- Christopher Rivera as Scooty, Moonee's friend
- Caleb Landry Jones as Jack, Bobby's son
- Aiden Malik as Dicky, Moonee's friend who moves away
- Josie Olivo as Grandma Stacey, Jancey's grandmother
- Edward "Punky" Pagan as Dicky's dad
- Patti Wiley as Amber, a receptionist at Magic Castle
- Rosa Medina Perez as Bertha, who does the laundry at Magic Castle
- Mela Murder as Ashley, Scooty's mother
- Sandy Kane as Gloria, who likes to sit by the Magic Castle pool topless
- Jim Coleman as a cabbie
- Andrew Romano as a newlywed on a honeymoon
- Carolina Grabova as a newlywed on a honeymoon
- Terry Allen Jones as Patrice, a receptionist at Magic Castle
- Karren Karagulian as Narek, the owner of Magic Castle
- Carl Bradfield as Charlie Coachman, a man Bobby ejects from Magic Castle property
- Shail Kamini Ramcharan as Arabian Nights owner
- Kit Sullivan as Arabian Nights manager Jimmy
- Macon Blair as tourist John
- Lauren O'Quinn as DCF investigator
- Cecilia Quinan as DCF supervisor

== Production ==
=== Development ===
Writer Chris Bergoch noticed a lot of children playing in motel parking lots while visiting his mother in Orlando, Florida. Sean Baker said he had always been inspired by the Our Gang films, because the characters "were actually living in poverty, but the focus was the joy of childhood, the humor that comes from watching and hearing children."

In December 2017, producer Andrew Duncan stepped down from his role as financier of June Pictures after numerous allegations of sexual harassment. Baker said:

While we did not witness nor have any knowledge of inappropriate behavior, we are of course deeply concerned about these allegations. I have been outspoken before and firmly believe that film sets and work environments absolutely must be safe spaces for everyone regardless of gender, age, race, or creed.

=== Filming ===
The Florida Project was filmed in the summer of 2016 on location in Osceola County, Florida, including at the real Magic Castle Inn & Suites on U.S. Highway 192 in Kissimmee, about six miles from Walt Disney World.

Unlike Baker's previous film, which was shot with an iPhone, The Florida Project was filmed on 35mm film, except for the final scene, which was shot without authorization in Disney World's Magic Kingdom park using an iPhone 6S Plus. To maintain secrecy, the shoot at the resort used a skeleton crew consisting of Baker, Bergoch, cinematographer Alexis Zabé, acting coach and associate producer Samantha Quan, actors Valeria Cotto and Brooklynn Prince, and the girls' guardians. Baker intended the ending to be open to interpretation:

We've been watching Moonee use her imagination and wonderment throughout the entire film to make the best of the situation she's in—she can't go to Disney's Animal Kingdom, so she goes to the "safari" behind the motel and looks at cows; she goes to the abandoned condos because she can't go to the Haunted Mansion. And in the end, with this inevitable drama, this is me saying to the audience, if you want a happy ending, you're gonna have to go to that headspace of a kid because, here, that's the only way to achieve it.

Baker's sister, billed as "Stephonik Youth", was the film's production designer. The film's signature pastel colors were already present at the location. When a construction or a group of sandhill cranes suddenly appeared, the cast and crew quickly improvised scenes that were highly praised for their cinéma vérité qualities.

== Release ==
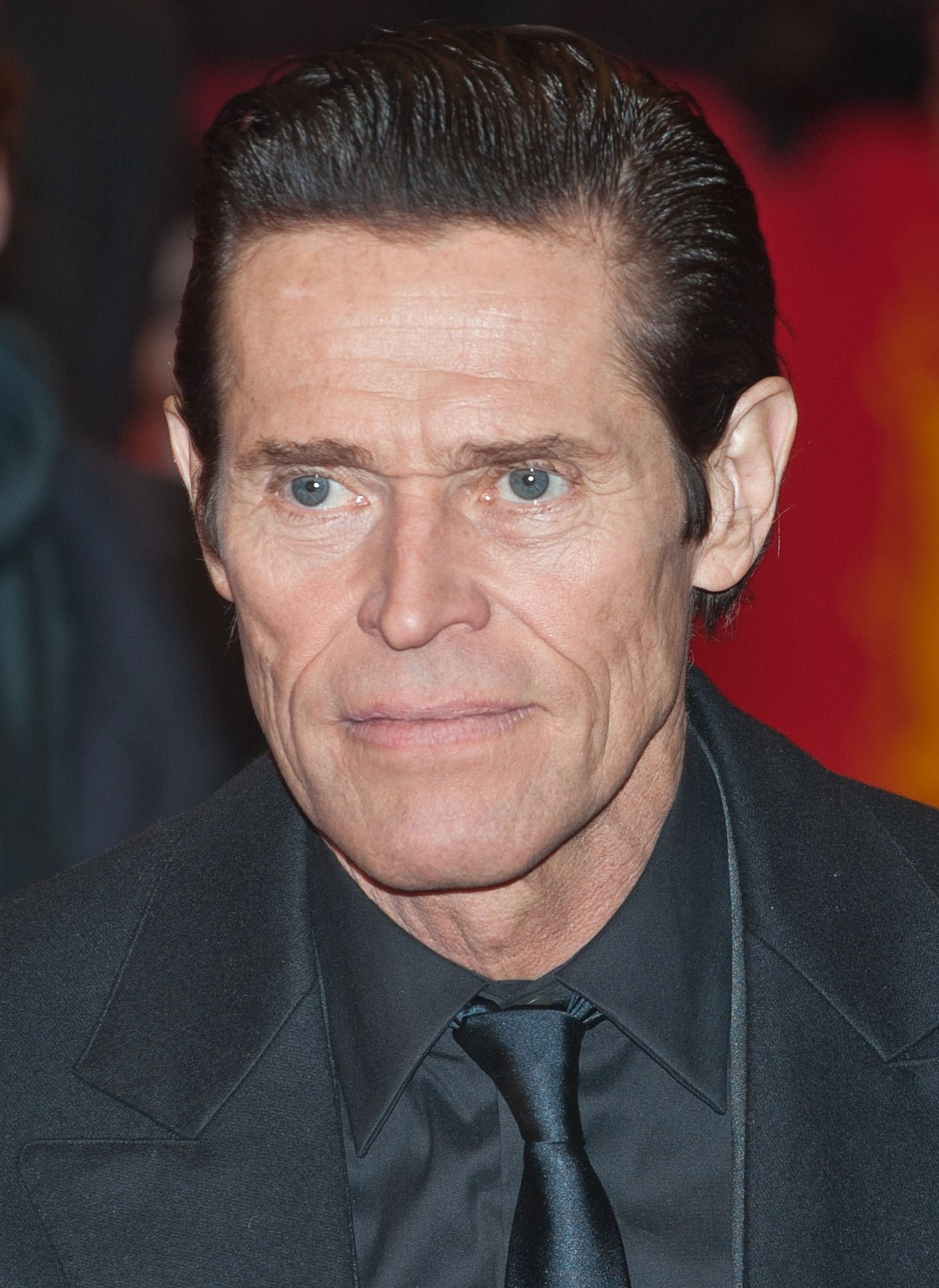
Willem Dafoe's performance was critically acclaimed and nominated for several awards, including the Academy Award for Best Supporting Actor

The film had its world premiere on May 22, 2017, in the Directors Fortnight section of the 2017 Cannes Film Festival, and shortly thereafter A24 acquired the film's U.S. distribution rights, which had also sparked interest from Amazon Studios, Neon, and Annapurna Pictures, among others. Its limited theatrical release in the U.S. began on October 6, 2017. Lionsgate released the film on Blu-ray, DVD, and download.

== Reception ==
=== Box office ===
The Florida Project grossed $5.9 million in the United States and Canada and $5.3 million in other territories, for a worldwide total of $11.2 million, against a production budget of $2 million.

The film began its limited theatrical release in the United States on October 6, 2017, in four theaters, grossing $156,833 over its opening weekend for a per-theater average of $39,208, the highest of any film that weekend. It expanded to 33 theaters in its second weekend and grossed $368,149, an average of $11,156 per theater, to 112 theaters in its third weekend, when it made $602,171, and to 229 theaters by its sixth weekend, from November 10 to 12, 2017.

Outside North America, the film opened in the United Kingdom on November 10, 2017. Its highest-grossing international markets were France ($1.3 million), the United Kingdom ($808,000) and South Korea ($730,000).

=== Critical response ===
The Florida Project received critical acclaim upon its release, with particular praise for Baker's direction and the performances of Dafoe, Prince, and Vinaite. On review aggregator website Rotten Tomatoes, it has an approval rating of 96% based on 320 reviews, with an average rating of 8.8/10; the site's "critics consensus" reads: "The Florida Project offers a colorfully empathetic look at an underrepresented part of the population that proves absorbing even as it raises sobering questions about modern America." On Metacritic, the film has a weighted average score of 92 out of 100 based on reviews from 44 critics.

Ann Hornaday of The Washington Post wrote, "Dafoe delivers his finest performance in recent memory, bringing to life a levelheaded, unsanctimonious character who offers a glimmer of hope and caring within a world markedly short on both." Richard Roeper of the Chicago Sun-Times wrote, "It's film that'll make you wince at times, and you'll most likely not want to see twice, but seeing it once is an experience you'll not soon forget."

In June 2025, The Florida Project ranked 74th on The New York Times's list of "The 100 Best Movies of the 21st Century" and 70th on the "Readers' Choice" edition of the list. In July 2025, it ranked 63rd on Rolling Stone's list of "The 100 Best Movies of the 21st Century".
