= 28th Independent Spirit Awards =

US film awards ceremony in 2013

- Awarded for: Best in independent film
- Date: February 23, 2013
- Site: Santa Monica Pier; Santa Monica, California, U.S.
- Hosted by: Andy Samberg

Highlights
- Best Feature: Silver Linings Playbook
- Most awards: Silver Linings Playbook (4)
- Most nominations: Silver Linings Playbook and Moonrise Kingdom (5)

Television coverage
- Channel: IFC

The 28th Independent Spirit Awards, honoring the best independent films of 2012, were presented on February 23, 2013. The nominations were announced on November 27, 2012. The ceremony was hosted by Andy Samberg.

== Winners and nominees ==
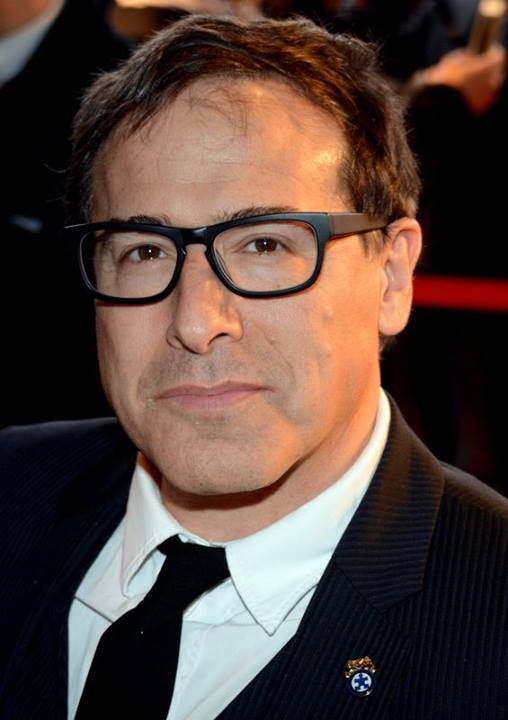
David O. Russell, Best Director and Best Screenplay winner

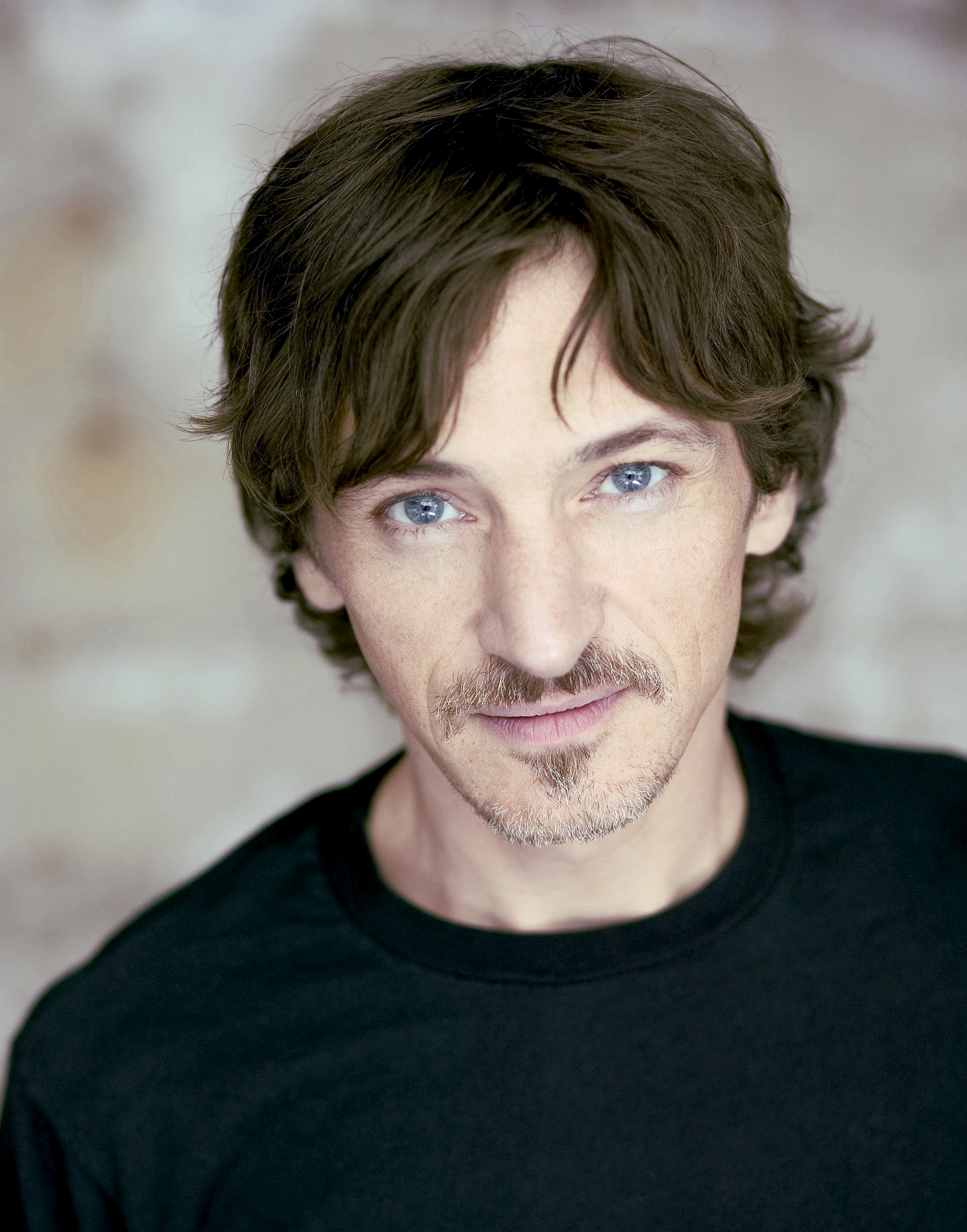
John Hawkes, Best Male Lead winner

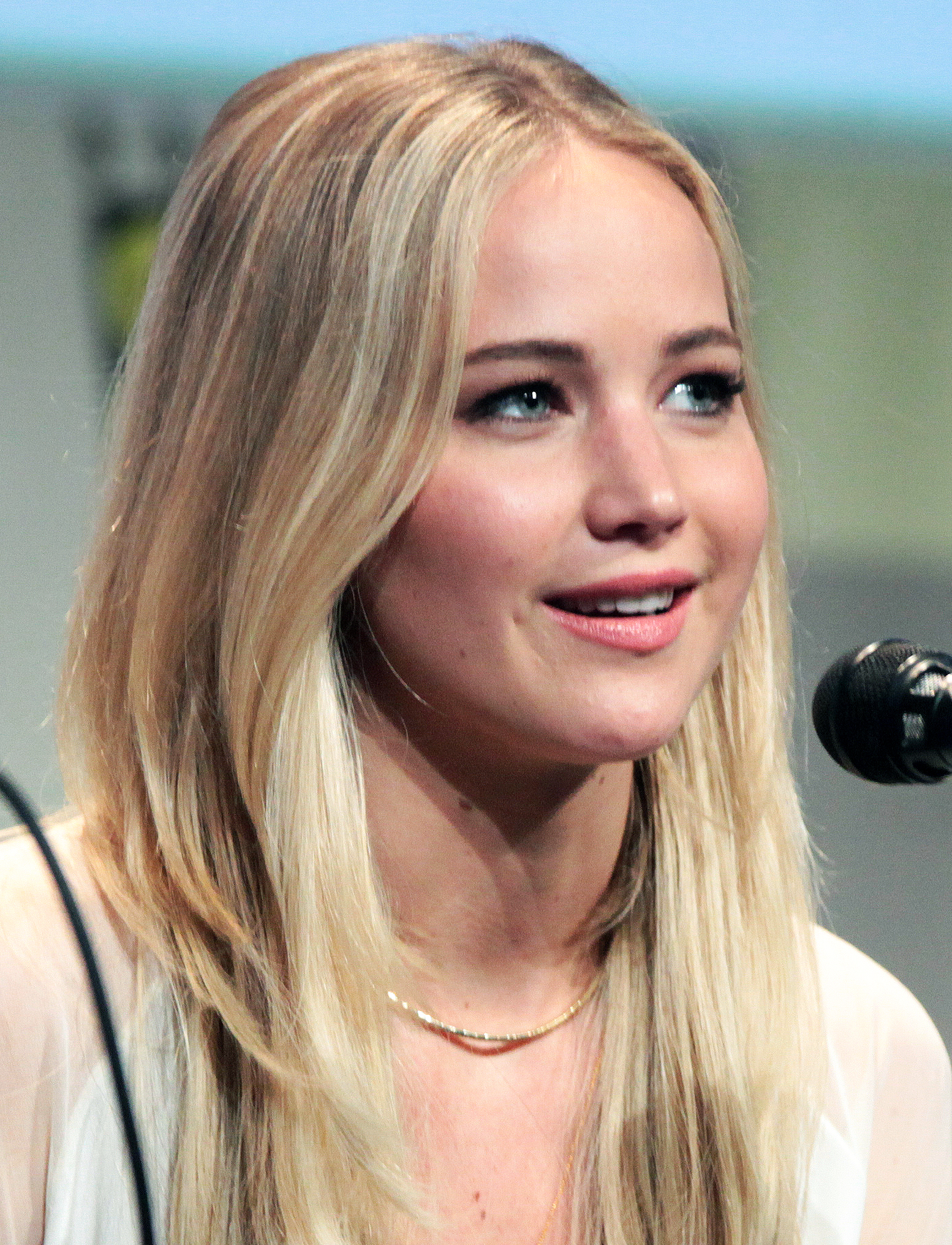
Jennifer Lawrence, Best Female Lead winner

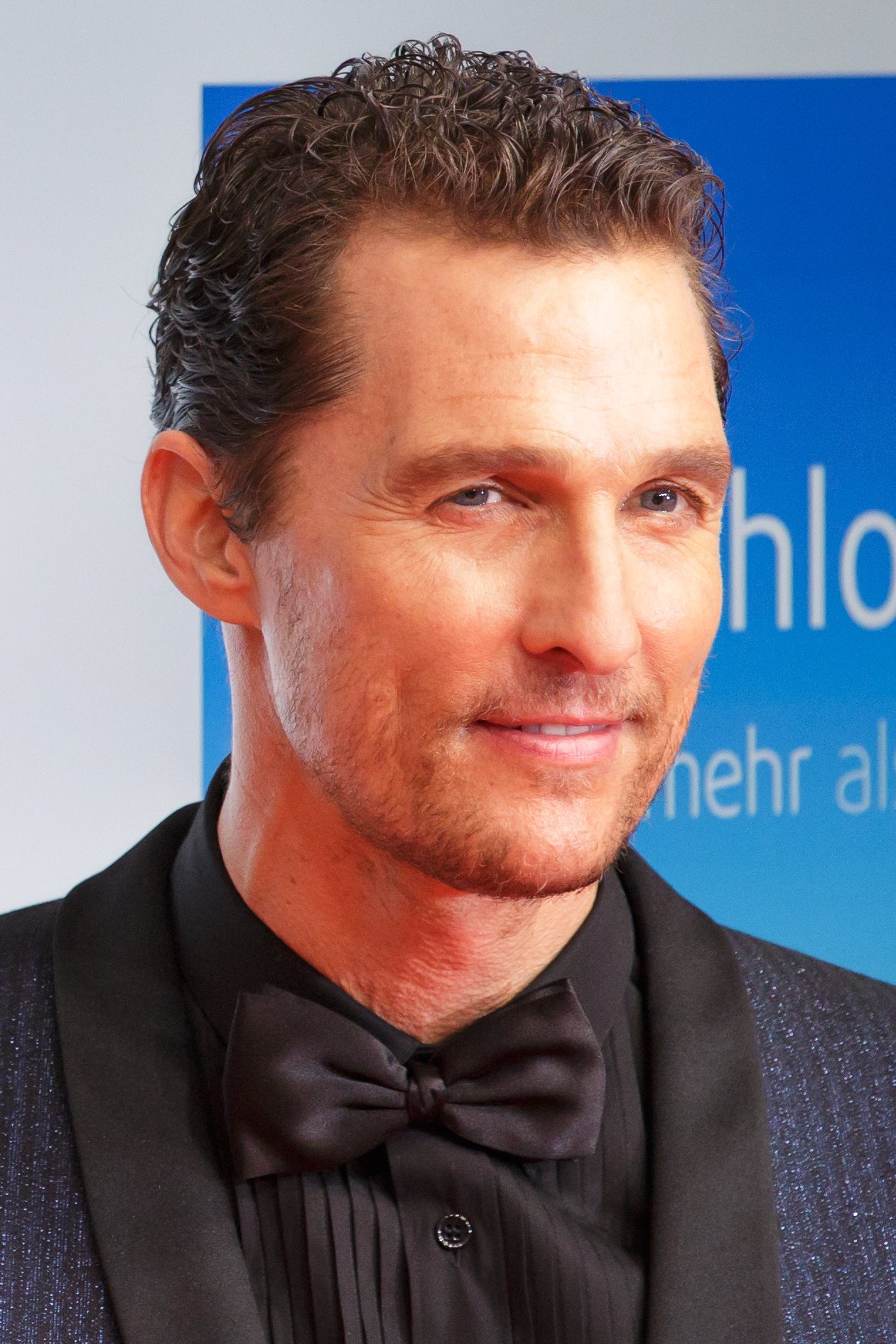
Matthew McConaughey, Best Supporting Male winner

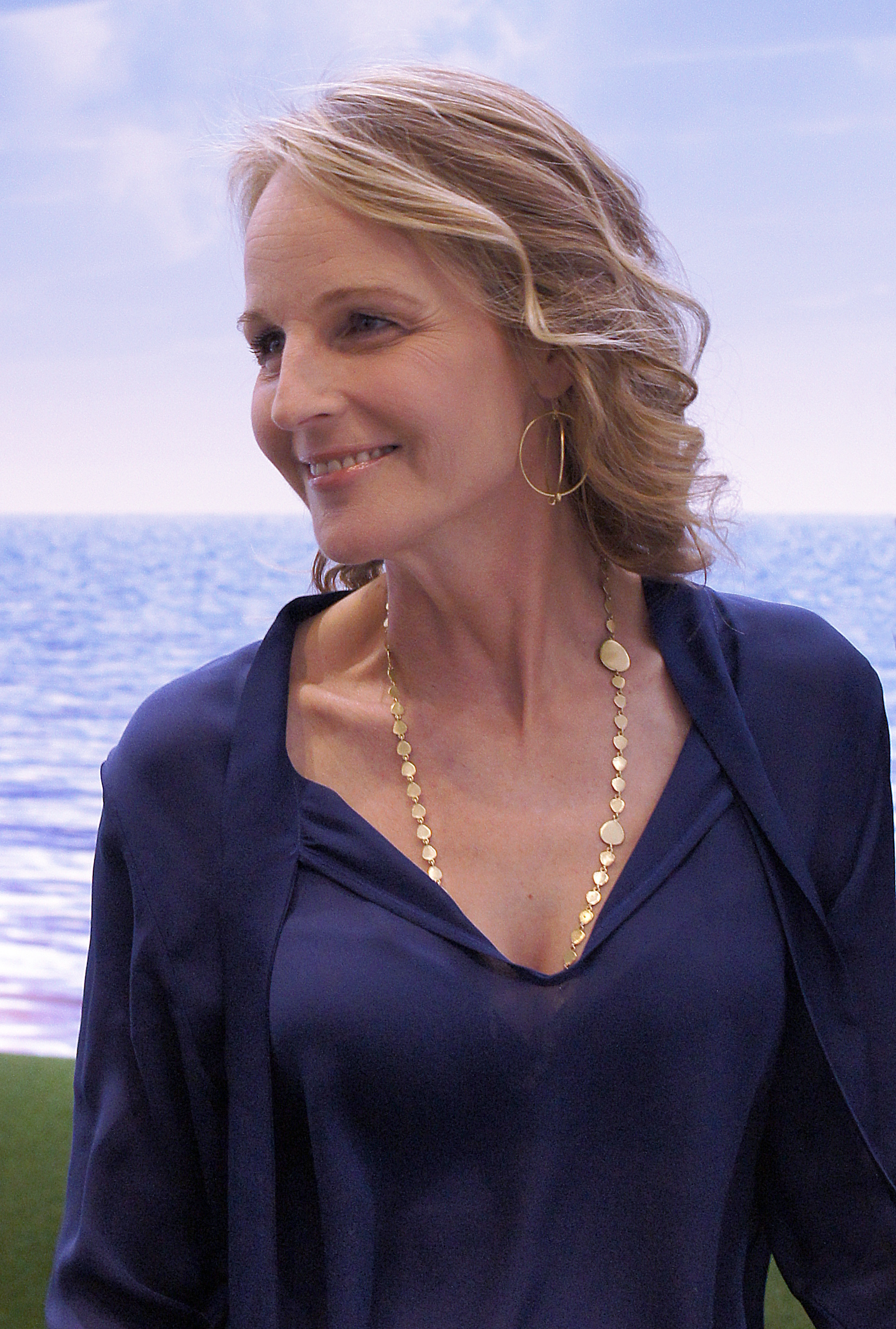
Helen Hunt, Best Supporting Female winner

Best Feature	Best Director
Silver Linings Playbook: Beasts of the Southern Wild; Bernie; Keep the Lights On; Moonrise Kingdom	David O. Russell – Silver Linings Playbook: Wes Anderson – Moonrise Kingdom; Julia Loktev – The Loneliest Planet; Ira Sachs – Keep the Lights On; Benh Zeitlin – Beasts of the Southern Wild
Best Male Lead	Best Female Lead
John Hawkes – The Sessions: Jack Black – Bernie; Bradley Cooper – Silver Linings Playbook; Thure Lindhardt – Keep the Lights On; Matthew McConaughey – Killer Joe; Wendell Pierce – Four	Jennifer Lawrence – Silver Linings Playbook: Linda Cardellini – Return; Emayatzy Corinealdi – Middle of Nowhere; Quvenzhané Wallis – Beasts of the Southern Wild; Mary Elizabeth Winstead – Smashed
Best Supporting Male	Best Supporting Female
Matthew McConaughey – Magic Mike: David Oyelowo – Middle of Nowhere; Michael Peña – End of Watch; Sam Rockwell – Seven Psychopaths; Bruce Willis – Moonrise Kingdom	Helen Hunt – The Sessions: Rosemarie DeWitt – Your Sister's Sister; Ann Dowd – Compliance; Brit Marling – Sound of My Voice; Lorraine Toussaint – Middle of Nowhere
Best Screenplay	Best First Screenplay
David O. Russell – Silver Linings Playbook: Wes Anderson and Roman Coppola – Moonrise Kingdom; Zoe Kazan – Ruby Sparks; Martin McDonagh – Seven Psychopaths; Ira Sachs and Mauricio Zacharias – Keep the Lights On	Derek Connolly – Safety Not Guaranteed: Rama Burshtein – Fill the Void; Christopher Ford – Robot & Frank; Rashida Jones and Will McCormack – Celeste and Jesse Forever; Jonathan Lisecki – Gayby
Best First Feature	Best Documentary Feature
The Perks of Being a Wallflower: Fill the Void; Gimme the Loot; Safety Not Guaranteed; Sound of My Voice	The Invisible War: The Central Park Five; How to Survive a Plague; Marina Abramović: The Artist Is Present; The Waiting Room
Best Cinematography	Best International Film
Ben Richardson – Beasts of the Southern Wild: Yoni Brook – Valley of Saints; Lol Crawley – Here; Roman Vasyanov – End of Watch; Robert Yeoman – Moonrise Kingdom	Amour • Austria / France / Germany: Once Upon a Time in Anatolia • Bosnia and Herzegovina / Turkey; Rust and Bone • Belgium / France; Sister • France / Switzerland; War Witch • Canada

=== Films with multiple nominations and awards ===
Films that received multiple nominations
Nominations	Film
5	Moonrise Kingdom
5	Silver Linings Playbook
4	Beasts of the Southern Wild
4	Keep the Lights On
3	Middle of Nowhere
2	Bernie
2	End of Watch
2	Fill the Void
2	Safety Not Guaranteed
2	The Sessions
2	Seven Psychopaths
2	Sound of My Voice

Films that won multiple awards
Awards	Film
4	Silver Linings Playbook
2	The Sessions

== Special awards ==
=== John Cassavetes Award ===
Middle of Nowhere

- Breakfast with Curtis
- The Color Wheel
- Mosquita y Mari
- Starlet

=== Truer Than Fiction Award ===
Peter Nicks – The Waiting Room

- Lucien Castaing-Taylor and Véréna Paravel – Leviathan
- Jason Tippet and Elizabeth Mims – Only the Young

=== Piaget Producers Award ===
Mynette Louie – Stones in the Sun

- Derrick Tseng – Prince Avalanche
- Alicia Van Couvering – Nobody Walks

=== Someone to Watch Award ===
Adam Leon – Gimme the Loot

- David Fenster – Pincus
- Rebecca Thomas – Electrick Children

=== Robert Altman Award ===
- Starlet – Sean Baker, Julia Kim, Dree Hemingway, Besedka Johnson, Karren Karagulian, Stella Maeve, and James Ransone

=== Special Distinction Award ===
- Harris Savides

=== Find Your Audience Award ===
Laura Colella – Breakfast with Curtis

- Sara Lamm and Mary Wigmore – Birth Story: Ina May Gaskin and the Farm Midwives
- John Mitchell and Jeremy Kipp Walker – The History of Future Folk
