= Alex Coco =

American film producer

- Coco at the 2026 New York Film Festival
- Born: Alexander Coco
- Education: Colgate University; USC School of Cinematic Arts
- Occupation: Film producer
- Spouse: Erin Yarbrough
- Relatives: Lawrence E. Gerosa (great-great uncle)

Alex Coco is an American film producer. He won an Academy Award in the category Best Picture for his producing work on the film Anora. He is also the co-recipient of the Critics’ Choice Award for Best Picture and the Producers Guild of America Award Best Theatrical Motion Picture.

== Early life and education ==
Coco is the son of Frank and Denise Coco. He is of Italian descent and his great-great-uncle, Lawrence E. Gerosa, was New York City Comptroller from 1954 to 1961.

Coco attended New Canaan High School, a public high school in New Canaan, Connecticut, and graduated from Colgate University in 2012.

== Selected filmography ==
- Red Rocket (producer - 2021)
- The Sweet East (producer - 2023)
- Pet Shop Days (producer - 2023)
- Allen Sunshine (executive producer - 2024)
- Anora (producer - 2024; won the Academy Award for Best Picture with Samantha Quan and Sean Baker)
- Club Kid (producer - 2026)
- Sandiwara (producer - 2026)
- My Darling California (producer - TBA)
