= 2013 Independent Spirit Awards =

The 2013 Independent Spirit Awards can refer to:

- 28th Independent Spirit Awards, a ceremony held in 2013, honoring the films of 2012
- 29th Independent Spirit Awards, a ceremony held in 2014, honoring the films of 2013
