= George Wendt =

American actor (1948–2025)

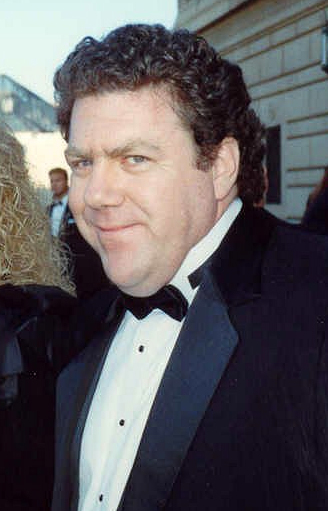
- Wendt in 1989
- Born: George Robert Wendt Jr. October 17, 1948; Chicago, Illinois, U.S.
- Died: May 20, 2025 (aged 76); Los Angeles, California, U.S.
- Education: Rockhurst University (BA)
- Occupation: Actor
- Years active: 1975–2025
- Known for: Norm Peterson in Cheers
- Spouse: Bernadette Birkett (m. 1978)
- Children: 3
- Relatives: Tom Howard (grandfather); Jason Sudeikis (nephew)

George Robert Wendt Jr. (October 17, 1948 – May 20, 2025) was an American actor. Wendt played Norm Peterson on the NBC sitcom Cheers from 1982 to 1993, which earned him six consecutive nominations for the Primetime Emmy Award for Outstanding Supporting Actor in a Comedy Series. After Cheers ended, he starred in his own short-lived CBS sitcom, The George Wendt Show (1995).

Wendt also appeared in the comedy films Airplane II: The Sequel (1982), No Small Affair (1984), Fletch (1985), The Little Rascals (1994), Man of the House (1995), Spice World (1997), Outside Providence (1999), and Sandy Wexler (2017), and the dramas Somewhere in Time (1980), Dreamscape (1984), Guilty by Suspicion (1991), Forever Young (1992), Lakeboat (2000), and The Climb (2019).

On television, Wendt had supporting and recurring roles on the series Making the Grade, Sabrina the Teenage Witch, and Fancy Nancy. He had guest roles on Saturday Night Live, Columbo, The Twilight Zone, Frasier, The Simpsons, Family Guy, Wings, and Portlandia. On stage, he appeared on Broadway playing Edna Turnblad in the musical comedy Hairspray from 2007 to 2008.

== Early life and education ==
George Robert Wendt Jr. was born in the Beverly neighborhood on the South Side of Chicago, Illinois. His parents were Loretta Mary (née Howard) and George Robert Wendt Sr., an officer in the U.S. Navy and a realtor. He was one of nine children, with six sisters—Kathryn, Loretta, Marti, Nancy, Karen, and Mary Ann—as well as two brothers, Tom and Paul. Their maternal grandfather was photographer Tom Howard. Wendt was of Irish and one quarter German descent. George Sr.'s side of the family was from Danzig while Loretta's relatives were from County Mayo. All four grandparents were born in Cook County, Illinois. Wendt was an uncle of actor and former Saturday Night Live writer and cast member Jason Sudeikis, his sister Kathryn's son.

Wendt graduated from Campion High School, a Jesuit boarding school in Prairie du Chien, Wisconsin. He attended the University of Notre Dame until he was expelled after receiving a 0.00 GPA during the first semester of his junior year. Wendt recalled in 2016 "I basically quit and didn't inform the university. I'd moved off campus my junior year, and I didn't think it through. I didn't have a car. It was cold. I never went to class." He later attended Roosevelt University before transferring to the Jesuit-affiliated Rockhurst College in Kansas City, Missouri, from which he graduated in 1971 with a B.A. in economics.

== Career ==
=== 1975–1981: Second City and early roles ===
Wendt was a 1975 alumnus of The Second City, which he discovered shortly after college. A viewing had inspired him to join and on his first day of employment, he showed up promptly at 11:30 a.m. as he was instructed. The woman working there handed him a broom and said "Welcome to the theater, kid"; thus, his first job in show business was sweeping the floors. Second City, located in Chicago, was also where he met his future wife, Bernadette Birkett, who played Cliff's Halloween date in the third season of Cheers and later in the series played the voice of Norm's never-seen wife, Vera.

Wendt appeared in the 1980 films My Bodyguard and Somewhere In Time, and had small roles in the TV series Taxi, Soap, and M*A*S*H. In 1982, Wendt landed his first role as a series regular on the CBS sitcom Making the Grade, which was created by Gary David Goldberg. The series was canceled after six episodes in the spring of that year.

=== 1982–1993: Breakthrough with Cheers ===
From 1982 to 1993, Wendt appeared as Norm Peterson in all 275 episodes of Cheers. For his work on Cheers, Wendt earned six Primetime Emmy Award nominations for Best Supporting Actor in a Comedy Series. He also played the role in the short-lived spin-off The Tortellis, in an episode of Wings, and in an episode of another Cheers spin-off, Frasier. Wendt, playing the character Norm, made a prominent entrance to the Cheers bar in nearly every episode, being greeted by a cheer of "Norm!" (except Diane, who called him Norman) and making a wisecrack as he walked to his barstool. This regular bit of business was a highlight of the show. Disparaging references to the character's wife, Vera, and the wretched state of his life were other running gags. Host International licensed the characters of Norm and Cliff to create animatronic robot likenesses in their airport bars. The actors sued for infringement of their publicity rights in Wendt v. Host International. The case was initially dismissed as the likeness to the actors was not strong but this was reversed on appeal.

Wendt's first appearance on Saturday Night Live was in a season 11 (1985–1986) episode where he shared hosting duties with director Francis Ford Coppola. His film appearances during this time included Airplane II: The Sequel (1982), Dreamscape (1984), No Small Affair (1984), Fletch (1985), House (1985), and Gung Ho (1986). In 1988, he played the part of "Witten" in the New Zealand-made film, Never Say Die. In the early 1990s, Wendt made cameo appearances on several episodes of SNL as Bob Swerski, one of the Chicago Superfans (along with cast members Chris Farley, Mike Myers, Robert Smigel, and one-time host Joe Mantegna). In 1989, Wendt appeared as the eponymous protagonist in a BBC TV dramatization of Ivan Goncharov's novel Oblomov. He also appeared twice on the original British edition of Whose Line Is It Anyway? In 1991, Wendt played the father in Michael Jackson's music video "Black or White". He had roles opposite Robert De Niro in 1991's Guilty by Suspicion and with Mel Gibson in 1992's Forever Young. In 1992, he appeared onstage in Chicago at the Body Politic Theatre in a musical satire called Wild Men, and played the same role in New York in 1993.

=== 1994–1999: Post-Cheers ===
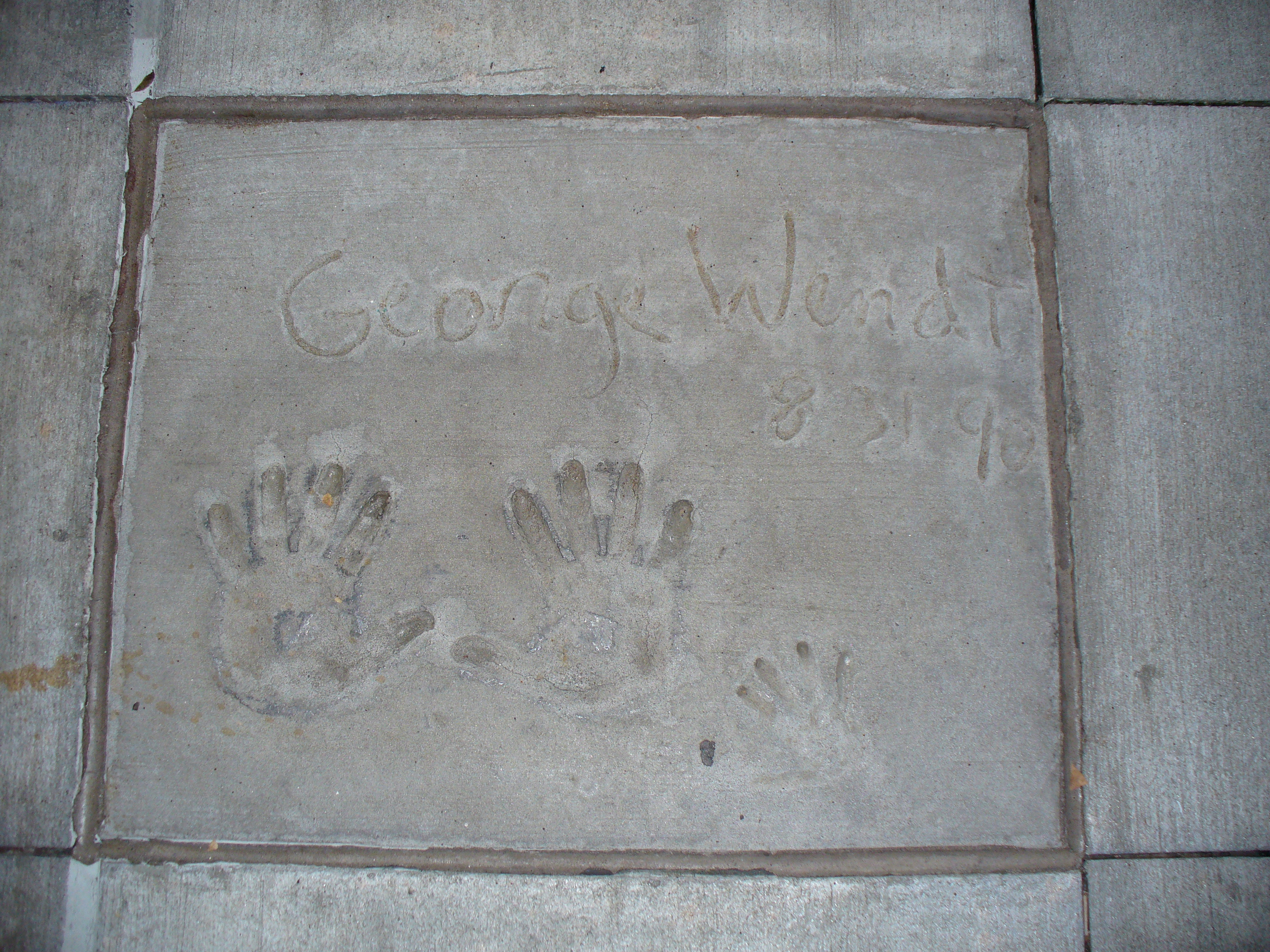
Wendt's handprints in concrete, in front of Hollywood Hills Amphitheater at Walt Disney World's Disney's Hollywood Studios theme park

Following his success on Cheers, Wendt starred in the short-lived The George Wendt Show, which featured him as a garage mechanic with a radio show, based on the NPR radio show Car Talk. The George Wendt Show aired from March through April 1995. Wendt also appeared on The Larry Sanders Show as a guest on the show. Wendt starred as the killer in one of the last episodes of the TV series Columbo, portraying a thoroughbred horse owner in the 1995 episode Strange Bedfellows. Wendt appeared as himself on Seinfeld and reprised the character Norm Peterson on The Simpsons episode "Fear of Flying", two episodes of Family Guy, "Road to Rupert" and "Three Kings", and the Frasier episode "Cheerful Goodbyes". In the same year as his Frasier guest appearance, Wendt played the bartender to Ted Danson's character in Becker (the inverse of their relationship on Cheers). In 1994, he made a cameo appearance in the film The Little Rascals. In 1995, he appeared in the film Man of the House as Chet Bronski, a stepfather who leads the boys' Indian Guides group, starring with Chevy Chase, Jonathan Taylor Thomas, and Farrah Fawcett. He also portrayed Martin Barnfield in the Spice Girls' movie Spice World (1997), and played a poker buddy of Old Man Dunphy who comes out as gay in the 1999 film Outside Providence.

In early 1997, Wendt joined the cast of the NBC sitcom The Naked Truth as Les Polonsky, the new owner of the celebrity tabloid where the series' main characters worked. Wendt's role only lasted 13 episodes as The Naked Truth underwent further creative changes for its next season. In 1998, Wendt was one of the three characters in a London West End production of 'Art' with David Dukes and Stacy Keach. He would later join the Broadway production of the play, starring alongside Judd Hirsch and Joe Morton.

=== 2000–2024: Broadway roles and other work ===
In 2000, he played First Mate Collins in the film Lakeboat. In 2003, Wendt appeared as a celebrity fisherman in the music video for Cobra Verde's "Riot Industry" along with Rudy Ray Moore (of "Dolemite" fame) and The Minutemen's Mike Watt. He appeared in several episodes of ABC's Sabrina, The Teenage Witch in 2001 as the title character's boss. He also was the host of the A&E reality show House of Dreams in 2004. In January 2006, Wendt was seen again on television screens as part of the cast of Modern Men.

In 2006, Wendt made several appearances on Late Night with Conan O'Brien where he performed short skits. His appearances on Late Night were in all likelihood because the show was having a week-long event in his home town of Chicago. He starred in a 2006 episode of Masters of Horror entitled "Family", directed by John Landis, and played Santa Claus in the ABC Family original film Santa Baby. Wendt performed alongside Richard Thomas in Twelve Angry Men in October 2006 in the Eisenhower Theater in Washington, D.C.. After the show opened, Wendt was interviewed by local film critic Arch Campbell for a piece on the NBC Washington affiliate WRC-TV. Wendt was asked, "What should people do when they see you around town?" After hesitating for a moment, Wendt held his thumbs up and replied, "If their impulse is to buy me a beer, then by all means, follow that impulse." In spring 2007, Wendt performed in 12 Angry Men in Los Angeles. Wendt appeared as an American GI in the 2007 Christmas Special episode of British sitcom The Green Green Grass.

In 2008 he starred in the Broadway musical Hairspray as the character of Edna Turnblad. He appeared with his former Cheers co-star John Ratzenberger as a talent scout on Last Comic Standing during Season 6. He briefly appeared as Santa Claus in A Colbert Christmas: The Greatest Gift of All!. He also appeared in the 2008 horror film Bryan Loves You directed by Seth Landau.

On October 1, 2009, Wendt appeared on The Colbert Report the day before the IOC announced which city will host the 2016 Summer Olympics. In their way of supporting Chicago's bid for the games, Wendt and Stephen Colbert humorously insulted the three other bidding cities, Rio de Janeiro, Madrid, and Tokyo, all while drinking Chicago's favorite Old Style Beer. In 2009, Wendt starred as Santa Claus in Santa Buddies and also had a small role in the film Opposite Day.

Wendt appeared in a production of Hairspray, reprising his role as Edna Turnblad, from September 8 to October 9, 2010, at the Charlottetown Festival in Prince Edward Island, Canada. Wendt played Santa in Elf the Musical on Broadway. The show opened November 14, 2010, and ran through January 2, 2011. Wendt starred in a production of Hairspray as Edna Turnblad at Rainbow Stage in Winnipeg, Manitoba, Canada, from August 2, 2011, to August 21, 2011. Wendt also guest-starred in the TV series Hot In Cleveland as Yoder, based on his character Norm in Cheers. His first of two scenes took place in an Amish bar, where everyone in the bar yelled "Yoder!", referencing what the cast of Cheers would yell whenever he walked in.

Wendt was among the thespians who participated in a poster campaign touting live theatre in Chicago. Other celebrities who were involved included John Mahoney, John Malkovich, Terry Kinney, and Martha Plimpton. Wendt appeared in a cameo as a newspaper reporter on Portlandia on January 25, 2013. Wendt played the role of Pap in the 2013 Hank Williams bio musical Lost Highway at the Merry-Go-Round Playhouse in Auburn, New York.

Beginning in the fall of 2013, Wendt appeared in a television commercial for State Farm Insurance. Wendt and Robert Smigel reprised their roles from SNL as the Chicago Superfans, who encounter quarterback Aaron Rodgers. The commercial continued the theme of State Farm commercials featuring Rodgers, using the "discount doublecheck" slogan.

From November 6, 2013, to January 19, 2014, Wendt starred in Never Too Late, a comedy with his wife, actress Bernadette Birkett, at New Theatre Restaurant in Overland Park, Kansas. In this play, Wendt portrayed a successful lumber yard owner who is king of his castle and whose life is going exactly the way he wants until his wife comes back from a doctor's appointment with some big news. In 2015, Wendt starred opposite his former Second City co-star Tim Kazurinsky in Bruce Graham's new comedy Funnyman at Northlight Theatre. The same year, Wendt appeared in the TBS sitcom Clipped, which aired for one season. Wendt appeared as Tracy Turnblad's mother in a production of Hairspray featuring John Waters and the Baltimore Symphony Orchestra in Baltimore, Maryland in June 2016.

Wendt starred in The Fabulous Lipitones at New Theatre Restaurant in Overland Park, Kansas, from November 30, 2016, to February 12, 2017. Wendt starred as Willy Loman in Death of a Salesman at St. Jacob's Country Playhouse in Waterloo, Ontario, Canada, from October 18 to November 4, 2017. His later films included the comedies Sandy Wexler (2017) and The Climb (2019).

In 2023, Wendt competed in season nine of The Masked Singer as "Moose" where he was mostly sitting during the performance. He was eliminated on "'80s Night" alongside Christine Quinn of Selling Sunset fame as "Scorpio".

In January 2024, Wendt reunited with most of the Cheers cast at the 75th Primetime Emmy Awards, presenting the awards for best directing and best writing of a comedy series.

== Personal life and death ==
In 1974, Wendt met actress Bernadette Birkett at the Second City theater in Chicago. They married in 1978 and Birkett later voiced his off-screen wife, Vera, in Cheers. The couple had three children.

Wendt died of a massive heart attack at his home in Los Angeles, on May 20, 2025, at the age of 76. Contributing conditions included congestive heart failure, coronary artery disease, and hypertension (high blood pressure). He also had end-stage renal disease and hyperlipidemia (high blood cholesterol).

Several of his Cheers co-stars offered remembrances of him including Ted Danson, Kelsey Grammer, Rhea Perlman, and John Ratzenberger. Others who paid tribute to him included Melissa Joan Hart, Eric Allan Kramer, Bill Simmons, Joe Mantegna, Robert Smigel and his nephew Jason Sudeikis. The real life Cheers Beacon Hill bar honored Wendt by setting up a memorial in the area of the bar where his character sat. Chicago honored him with a "George Wendt Way" designation on the block where he grew up.

== Filmography ==
=== Film ===
Year	Title	Role	Notes
1978	A Wedding	Caterer	Uncredited
1980	Bronco Billy	Bartender	Uncredited
1980	My Bodyguard	Engineer	
1980	Somewhere In Time	Student #2	
1980	The Gift of the Magi	Shopkeeper	Short film
1982	Jekyll and Hyde... Together Again	Injured Man	
1982	Airplane II: The Sequel	Carry-on Baggage Attendant	Uncredited
1984	Young Lust	Avery Lumpig	
1984	Dreamscape	Charlie Prince	
1984	Thief of Hearts	Marty Morrison	
1984	No Small Affair	Jake	
1985	Fletch	Fat Sam	
1985	House	Harold Gorton	
1986	Gung Ho	Buster	
1988	Plain Clothes	Chet Butler	
1988	Never Say Die	Mr. Witten	
1989	Cranium Command	Stomach	Short film
1990	Masters of Menace	Dr. Jack Erheart	
1991	Guilty by Suspicion	Bunny Baxter	
1992	Forever Young	Harry Finley	
1994	Hostage for a Day	Warren Kooey	
1994	The Little Rascals	Lumberyard Clerk	
1995	Man of the House	Chet Bronski (Chief Running Horse)	
1996	Space Truckers	Keller	
1997	The Lovemaster	Therapist	
1997	Spice World	Film Producer	
1998	Anarchy TV	Abbey Archer	
1998	Dennis the Menace Strikes Again	Policeman	Video; Uncredited
1998	Rupert's Land	Ivan Bloat	
1999	Outside Providence	Joey	
2000	Garage: A Rock Saga	Pitching Coach	
2000	Lakeboat	First Mate Collins	
2000	The Prime Gig	Archie	
2000	Wild About Harry	Frankie	
2001	Prairie Dogs	Actor	Short film
2001	Odessa or Bust	The Chef	Short film
2002	Teddy Bears' Picnic	General Edison "Pete" Gerberding	
2003	My Dinner with Jimi	Bill Uttley	
2003	King of the Ants	Duke Wayne	
2005	As Seen On TV	Donald	Short film
2005	Edmond	Pawn Shop Owner	
2005	Kids in America	Coach Thompson	
2005	The Life Coach	George	
2007	LA Blues	Mickey	
2007	Saturday Morning	Harold	
2008	Clean Break	Chuck	
2008	Bryan Loves You	Mr. Flynn	
2008	Unnatural Causes	Chuck	
2009	Opposite Day	Corporate Exec #1	
2009	Santa Buddies	Santa Claus	Direct-to-DVD
2016	Wake Up America!	Richard	
2017	Sandy Wexler	Testimonial	
2018	The Independents	Eduardo	
2018	Dream Flight	Randall	Short film
2018	Dr. Sugar	Marvin Saccharine	Short film
2018	The Deadbeat	The Great Kazoo	Short film
2019	Grand-Daddy Day Care	Big Lou	Direct-to-video
2019	The Climb	Jim	
2019	I Lost My Body	Georges (voice)	English dub
2019	Bliss	Pops	
2019	VFW	Thomas Zabriski	
2019	Thank You Kindly	Neighbor Bradley Walden	Short film
2020	Stealing a Survivor	Mister Martin	
2021	Americanish	Douglas Smarts	
2022	Christmas with the Campbells	Robert Campbell	

=== Television ===
Year	Title	Role	Notes
1981	Hart to Hart	Sgt. Tate	Episode: "Murder Is a Drag"
1981	Soap	Counterman	Episode #4.15
1981	Taxi	The Exterminator	Episode: "Latka the Playboy"
1982	Alice	Monty	Episode: "Monty Falls for Alice"
1982	Making the Grade	Gus Bertoia	Main role
1982	M*A*S*H	Pvt. La Roche	Episode: "Trick or Treatment"
1982–1993	Cheers	Norm Peterson	Main role, 275 episodes, also directed 1 episode
1983	Garfield on the Town	Ràoul (voice)	TV short
1983	Likely Stories, Vol. 4	Wary Witness	Television film
1984	Garfield in the Rough	Ranger #2 (voice)	TV short
1984	The Ratings Game	Mr. Sweeney	Television film
1985	The Romance of Betty Boop	Johnny Throat / Punchie (voice)	TV short
1985	St. Elsewhere	Norm Peterson	Episode: "Cheers"
1986	The Twilight Zone	Barney Schlessinger	Episode: "The World Next Door"
1986–2003	Saturday Night Live	Himself / various	2 episodes as host, 9 episodes as guest
1987	The Tortellis	Norm Peterson	Episode: "Frankie Comes to Dinner"
1988	Mickey's 60th Birthday	Norm Peterson	TV special
1989	Day by Day	Stan	Episode: "Fraternity"
1989	The Magical World of Disney	Norm Peterson	Episode: "Disneyland's 35th Anniversary Celebration"
1990	The Earth Day Special	Norm Peterson	TV special
1990	Wings	Norm Peterson	Episode: "The Story of Joe"
1991	Tales from the Crypt	Mr. Crosswhite	Episode: "The Reluctant Vampire"
1992	Roc	Stan Mason	Episode: "The Stan Who Came to Dinner"
1992	The Edge	Various	Episode #1.16
1992	Seinfeld	Himself	Episode: "The Trip: Part 1"
1993	Bob	Himself	Episode: "Da Game"
1993	The Building	Cappucino Guy	Episode: "The Waiting Game"
1994	The Larry Sanders Show	George Wendt	Episode: "Hank's Night in the Sun"
1994	The Simpsons	Norm Peterson (voice)	Episode: "Fear of Flying"
1995	The George Wendt Show	George Coleman	Main role
1995	Columbo	Graham McVeigh	Episode: "Strange Bedfellows"
1995	Shame II: The Secret	Mac	Television film
1995	Bye Bye Birdie	Harry MacAfee	Television film
1996	Spin City	Dan Donaldson	Episode: "The High and the Mighty"
1996	Alien Avengers	Charlie	Television film
1997	Alien Avengers II	Charlie	Television film
1997	The Naked Truth	Les Polansky	3 episodes
1997	The Price of Heaven	Sam	Television film
1997	Whose Line Is It Anyway?	Himself	3 episodes
1999	Alice in Wonderland	Fred Tweedledee	Television film
2000	The Pooch and the Pauper	Sheldon Sparks	Television film
2000	Madigan Men	Carl	4 episodes
2000	The List	Guest Host	1 episode
2001	Strange Relations	Howard	Television film
2001	Robertson's Greatest Hits	Tom Robertson	Television film
2001–2002	Sabrina the Teenage Witch	Mike Shelby	6 episodes
2002	Becker	Frank	Episode: "V-Day"
2002	Frasier	Norm Peterson	Episode: "Cheerful Goodbyes"
2004	House of Dreams	Host	Television series
2004	Rock Me Baby	Monty	Episode: "Not-So-Grand Parents"
2004	George Lopez	Ed	2 episodes
2006	Modern Men	Tug Clarke	6 episodes
2006	Masters of Horror	Harold Thompson	Episode: "Family"
2006	Santa Baby	Santa Claus	Television film
2007	Imperfect Union	Duke	Television film
2007	Larry the Cable Guy's Christmas Spectacular	Santa Claus	Television film
2007	The Green Green Grass	Cliff Cooper	Episode: "The Special Relationship"
2007–2009	Family Guy	Norm Peterson (voice)	2 episodes
2008	A Colbert Christmas: The Greatest Gift of All!	Santa Claus	TV special
2010	Cubed	George Wendt	Episode #1.20
2010	Less Than Kind	Tiny	Episode: "Road Trip"
2010	Ghost Whisperer	George the Plumber	Episode: "The Children's Parade"
2011	Hot in Cleveland	Yoder	Episode: "Where's Elka?"
2011	Harry's Law	Franklin Chickory	Episode: "American Girl"
2012	The Seven Year Hitch	Mr. Henderson	Television film
2012	Kickin' It	Uncle Blake	Episode: "Kickin' It On Our Own"
2012	A Christmas Wedding Date	Mr. Destiny	Television film
2012	Merry In-Laws	Santa Claus	Television film
2013	Portlandia	George Heely	Episode: "Off the Grid"
2014	Kirstie	Duke	Episode: "Thelma's Ex"
2014	Verdene and Gleneda	Uncle Beanie	Episode: "A Town Called Peculiar"; web series
2014	Franklin & Bash	Henry "Hank" Shae	Episode: "Honor Thy Mother"
2015	Comedy Bang! Bang!	Himself	Episode: "Jesse Tyler Ferguson Wears a Brown Checked Shirt and Stripey Socks"
2015	Clipped	Buzzy	Main role
2016	Childrens Hospital	Governor Jasper Ruth	Episode: "By the Throat"
2017	Mommy, I Didn't Do It	J.D. Pierce	Television film
2017	Bill Nye Saves the World	Hacked Support Group Member / Polio	2 episodes
2018	The Greatest American Hero	Bob Rice	Television film
2018	Fresh Off the Boat	Harv	Episode: "Workin' the 'Ween"
2018–2022	Fancy Nancy	Grandpa Anderson (voice)	11 episodes
2019	Eddie's	The Captain	Television film
2019	Your Pretty Face Is Going to Hell	Famine	Episode: "The Poor Horsemen of the Apocalypse"
2019	Peyton's Places	Bob Swerski	Episode: "Da Bears"
2019	The Goldbergs	Ned Frank	Episode: "Food in a Geoffy"
2019	Christmas 9 to 5	Manny O'Quinn	Television film
2023	The Masked Singer	Himself/Moose	Season 9 contestant
2024	Love's Second Act	Mr. Leoni	Television film; final appearance

=== Theater ===
Year	Title	Role	Venue	Ref.
1988	Super Sunday	George	Williamstown Theatre Festival, Massachusetts	
1988	Tom Jones	Squire Western	Williamstown Theatre Festival, Massachusetts	
1990	A Funny Thing Happened on the Way to the Forum	Pseudolus	Williamstown Theatre Festival, Massachusetts	
1993	Wild Men!	Ken Finnerty	Westside Theatre, Off-Broadway	
1998	Art	Yvan (replacement)	Royale Theatre, Broadway	
2000	An Empty Plate in the Cafe du Grand Boeuf	Victor	Primary Stages, Off-Broadway	
2002	Rounding Third	Don	Northlight Theatre, Chicago	
2006	Twelve Angry Men	Juror No. 1	US national tour	
2008	Hairspray	Edna Turnblad (replacement)	Neil Simon Theater, Broadway	
2009	Minsky's	Randolph Sumner	Ahmanson Theatre, Los Angeles	
2010	Elf	Santa Claus	Al Hirschfeld Theatre, Broadway	
2012	Hello! My Baby	Bert Coots	Rubicon Theater, California	
2012	Hello! My Baby	Bert Coots	Lobero Theatre, California	
2012	Re-Animator: The Musical	Dean Halsey	New York Musical Theatre Festival, Off-Broadway	
2013	Breakfast at Tiffany's	Joe Bell	Cort Theater, Broadway	
2013	Never Too Late	Harry Lambert	New Theatre Restaurant, Kansas	
2014	The Fox on the Fairway	Dickie Bell	Stage West, Calgary	
2015	Funnyman	Chick Sherman	Northlight Theatre, Chicago	
2017	Rock and Roll Man: The Alan Freed Story	J. Edgar Hoover	Bucks County Playhouse, Pennsylvania	
2019	Rock and Roll Man: The Alan Freed Story	J. Edgar Hoover	Berkshire Theater Group, Massachusetts	

=== Music videos ===
Year	Title	Role	Artist	Notes
1984	"Ghostbusters"	Himself	Ray Parker Jr.	Uncredited cameo
1991	"Black or White"	Father	Michael Jackson	Uncredited
1993	"Black Gold"	Guy Pushing Car	Soul Asylum	
1993	Dangerous: The Short Films	Father	Michael Jackson	"Black or White" video segment
1995	Video Greatest Hits – HIStory	Father	Michael Jackson	"Black or White" video segment
2000	"Responsibility"	Boss	MxPx	Uncredited

== Awards and nominations ==
Organizations	Year	Category	Work	Result	Ref.
Primetime Emmy Awards	1984	Outstanding Supporting Actor in a Comedy Series	Cheers	Nominated	
Primetime Emmy Awards	1985	Outstanding Supporting Actor in a Comedy Series	Cheers	Nominated	
Primetime Emmy Awards	1986	Outstanding Supporting Actor in a Comedy Series	Cheers	Nominated	
Primetime Emmy Awards	1987	Outstanding Supporting Actor in a Comedy Series	Cheers	Nominated	
Primetime Emmy Awards	1988	Outstanding Supporting Actor in a Comedy Series	Cheers	Nominated	
Primetime Emmy Awards	1989	Outstanding Supporting Actor in a Comedy Series	Cheers	Nominated	
