= Karren Karagulian =

Armenian and American actor (born 1969)

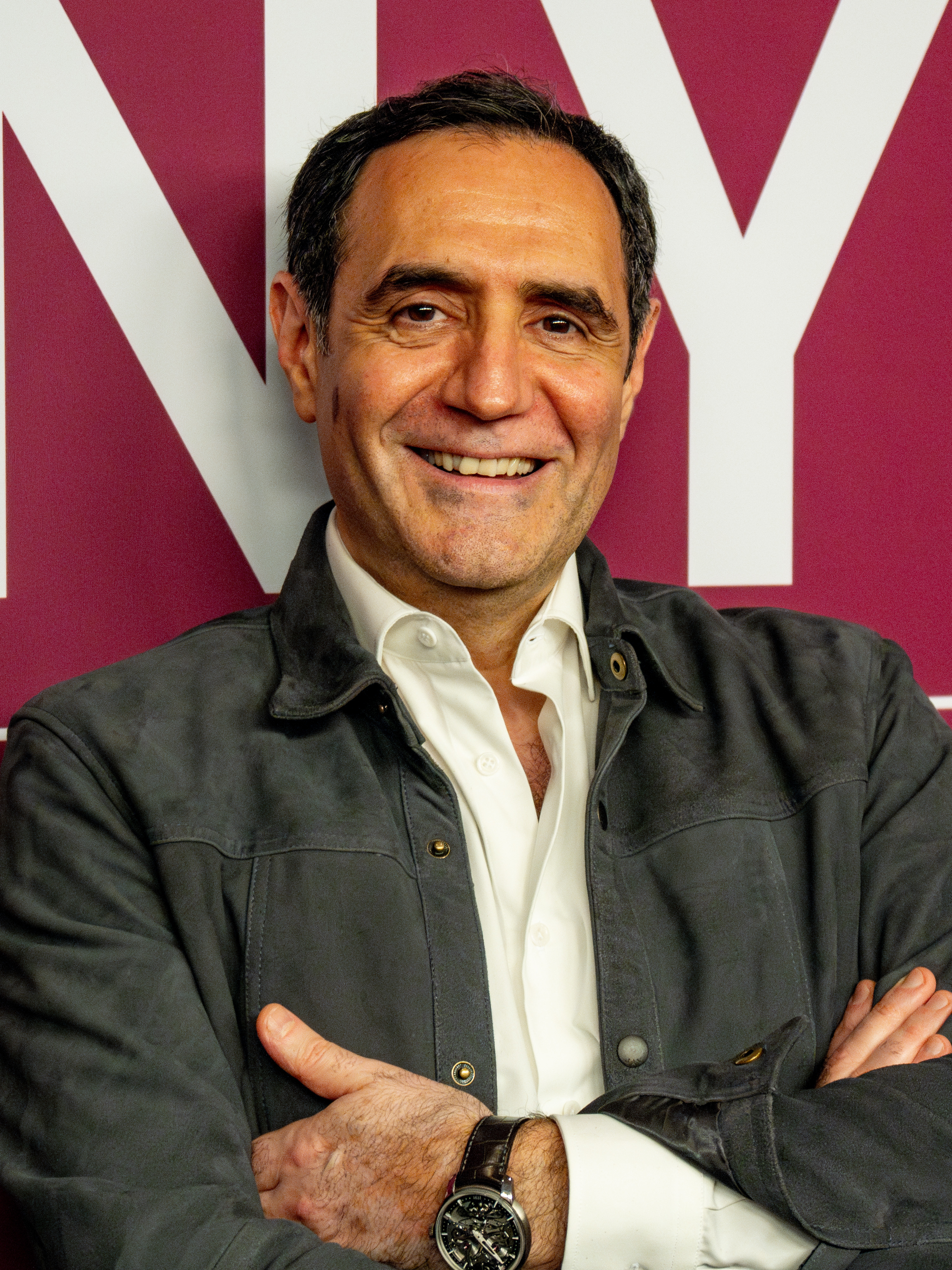
- Karagulian in 2024
- Born: 1969 (age 56–57); Armenian SSR, Soviet Union
- Occupations: Actor; producer; screenwriter
- Years active: 1996–present

Karren Karagulian (Armenian: Կարեն Կարագուլյան, romanized: Karen Karagulyan; born 1969) is an Armenian-American actor.

He is known primarily for his collaborations with director Sean Baker, with whom he has worked since the early 1990s. In 2024, he was nominated for the Independent Spirit Award for Best Supporting Performance for his role in Anora.

== Career ==
Karagulian was born in Soviet Armenia. He left the Armenian SSR at 18 and served in the Soviet Army in Saint Petersburg. He later immigrated to New York City at 20, where he first met Sean Baker, who attended New York University at the time. In addition to starring in all of Baker's films, Karagulian is also credited as a producer on Tangerine, explaining "for Tangerine, I helped find Armenian actors, wrote Armenian dialogue, translated, or wrote subtitles for the film."

His first film for Sean Baker was Four Letter Words in 2000, where he played the gas station clerk. In 2024, Karagulian starred in Baker's Anora. Regarding the history of the film, Karagulian explained "we started actually writing a story together in 2009– it was like a buddy-buddy kind of story happening in Brighton Beach. And we were trying to get it made, but we couldn't get it financed . . . a few years ago, he called me, and he said that he wrote this script that he wants me to read, and he sent me Anora. I was in awe at how well-written, how sharp a screenplay that was. I fell in love with it. And of course, we’ve been communicating always regarding names of characters, or some locations, or some Armenian dialog, or some Russian dialog."

Though Karagulian considered retirement from acting prior to Anora, the film's success resulted in increased attention and rejuvenated his career. He is set to star in the upcoming Christmas action film The Man with the Bag, alongside Alan Ritchson and Arnold Schwarzenegger, and The Further Mis-Adventures of Cliff Booth, a sequel to Quentin Tarantino's Once Upon a Time in Hollywood, alongside Brad Pitt.

== Selected filmography ==
Key
†	Denotes films that have not yet been released

=== Film ===
Year	Title	Role	Notes	Ref(s)
2000	Four Letter Words	Gas station clerk		
2004	Take Out	Chicken or beef		
2008	Prince of Broadway	Levon		
2012	Starlet	Arash	Also co-producer	
2015	Tangerine	Razmik		
2017	The Florida Project	Narek		
2021	Red Rocket	Arash		
2024	Anora	Toros	Nominated for Independent Spirit Award for Best Supporting Performance	
2026	The Further Mis-Adventures of Cliff Booth	Chicken Hawk		
2026	The Man with the Bag †		Post-production	
