= Edna Turnblad =

Fictional character

- First appearance: Hairspray
- Created by: John Waters
- Portrayed by: Divine (Original film); Harvey Fierstein (Musical); John Travolta (Musical film)

In-universe information
- Gender: Female
- Occupation: Laundress
- Spouse: Wilbur Turnblad
- Children: Tracy Turnblad (daughter)
- Nationality: American

Edna Turnblad is a fictional character from the 1988 film Hairspray and its stage musical adaptation of the same name, as well as its film and television adaptations.

Edna is a laundress living in Baltimore with her husband Wilbur and mother of Tracy, the plot's protagonist. She comments heavily on her insecurities related to her weight, even bringing up her diet pills several times throughout the musical adaptation. The character is most well-known for being portrayed by a man in drag, with Edna's originator being Harris Glenn Milstead, a drag queen best known by the stage name "Divine."

== Character description ==
Music Theatre International, the licensing company that holds the rights for the musical, describes Edna as "Tracy's loving mother who doesn't spend much time outside the house. She works days and nights as a laundress in her home, and her lack of social interaction has made her a bundle of nerves."

The chapter "Embracing excess: The queer feminist power of musical theatre diva roles," in Michelle Dvoskin's Studies in Musical Theatre notes that Edna's drag portrayal "...adds queerness to the musical, which has no gay characters" and that the traditional standards of femininity, as well as diva roles in theatre, are challenged by the portrayal and eventual acceptance of the character's body type and size.

== Portrayals ==
=== Original film ===
In Hairspray's first iteration, the 1988 comedy film written and directed by John Waters, Edna was played by drag queen, actor, and singer, Divine. Originally, Waters had plans for Divine to play both Edna and Tracy, though eventually the idea was scrapped. However, Divine does also play Arvin Hodgepile, the racist television station manager out of drag. When describing the role, Divine noted that with this character he could not be accurately described as a drag queen, proclaiming "What drag queen would allow herself to look like this? I look like half the women from Baltimore."

Hairspray was Divine's last feature film, as he died three weeks after its premiere and only nine days after its theatrical release. He received widespread acclaim for the role, with critics proposing that with Hairspray, Divine finally broke into the mainstream world of film. He later received a posthumous nomination for the Independent Spirit Award for Best Supporting Male. In addition, Divine's groundbreaking performance as Edna is the inspiration for the continued casting of men in the role of Tracy's mother.

=== Musical adaptation ===
Edna was originated on Broadway in Hairspray's 2002 musical adaptation by actor and playwright Harvey Fierstein after premiering the role in the show's out-of-town tryout at the 5th Avenue Theatre in Seattle. Fierstein is known for his distinctly gravelly baritone voice type, adding another level of humor to his portrayal. Fierstein did not play the role for the entirety of its over six year Broadway run, but he, as well as Marissa Jaret Winokur who originated the role of Tracy, returned to the show for its last months of performances at the Neil Simon Theatre.

Fierstein's performance was highly praised by critics, with the Daily News' Howard Kissel noting that "With this role, Fierstein places himself in the great line of Broadway divas." His performance also earned him the 2003 Tony Award for Best Actor in a Musical, as well as the Drama Desk Award for Outstanding Actor in a Musical and the Drama League Award for Distinguished Performance.

Other notable portrayals of Edna onstage include Michael Ball in the show's West End premiere, as well as Michael McKean, Bruce Vilanch, John Pinette, Paul C. Vogt, George Wendt, Brian Conley, Phill Jupitus, Trevor Ashley, Nina West, and Shane Jacobson.

=== Musical film ===
From the early developmental stages of the 2007 musical film adaptation of Hairspray, John Travolta was in talks to play Edna on screen by executive producers Craig Zadan and Neil Meron. Once Travolta was confirmed in the role, Tory Gardner and his company Alterian, Inc. were hired to design and create Edna's look (including a fat suit consisting of layered pads and silicone, used from the chest upwards and foam latex arms and legs), collaborating with costume designer Rita Ryack, who shared Travolta's wishes to put Edna into several revealing outfits and give her body a defined figure.

Travolta's interpretation of the role had a heavy Baltimore accent (also fought for by the actor) and was an overall lighter portrayal of Edna. He received mixed reviews for his portrayal, with Slate's Dana Stevens going as far to say that "How you feel about Hairspray will depend entirely on your reaction to this performance..." David Denby of The New Yorker called Travolta's portrayal a "Blandly earnest betrayal," while some called his performance, and him by relation, outright homophobic. Despite this, Travolta was nominated for several awards including the Golden Globe for Best Supporting Actor in a Motion Picture.

=== Live musical television film ===
Fierstein returned to the role of Edna in the 2016 live television adaptation of the musical, Hairspray Live!, broadcast by NBC. The network's head of entertainment, Robert Greenblatt, stated that Fierstein's performance is "The iconic Edna Turnblad. We should memorialize that performance on film," and that his involvement with the production made it "come full circle". Though Greenblatt had also expressed interest in having Travolta reprise his role from the musical film. Fierstein also wrote the teleplay, adapting Mark O'Donnell and Thomas Meehan's book of the musical.

Variety's Sonia Saraiya highlighted Fierstein's performance as "Predictably great", with Caroline Siede of The A.V. Club agreeing, noting that the performance was "Wonderful."
