= Besedka Johnson =

American actress

- Born: Beatrice Vivian Divic; October 5, 1925; Detroit, Michigan, U.S.
- Died: April 4, 2013 (aged 87); Glendale, California, U.S.
- Occupation: Actress
- Years active: 2012

Beatrice Vivian "Besedka" Johnson (née Divic; October 5, 1925 – April 4, 2013) was an American actress who garnered acclaim at the age of 85 in the drama film Starlet (2012), her only role.

== Early life ==
Johnson was born Beatrice Vivian Divic in Detroit on October 5, 1925, one of two children of Milan and Frances Divic. She moved to Southern California with her family as a teenager.

== Career ==
Johnson worked briefly as a model. In the 1960s, she took on the nickname "Besedka" after a dress shop that she owned and operated in the San Fernando Valley. She later opened another Besedka dress store on Riverside Drive in North Hollywood, which closed in 1981. She then managed a condo in San Francisco for a time before returning to Los Angeles.

In 2011, Johnson had knee surgery; as part of her rehabilitation, she started swimming at a YMCA, where she was scouted at the age of 85 by a film producer seeking an older woman for a role in a movie. She was cast in a starring role in Sean Baker's drama film Starlet (2012), which would become her first and only role, and earned critical praise and awards for her performance.

== Personal life ==
At an unknown date, Divic married a painter whose surname was Johnson and took his surname. They had three sons named James, Marc, and Lloyd before getting divorced. She later married and divorced a second time.

== Death ==
On April 4, 2013, at the age of 87, Johnson died from complications following surgery for a bacterial infection at Glendale Memorial Hospital in Glendale, California. She was survived by her three sons and two grandchildren.

== Filmography ==
Year	Title	Role
2012	Starlet	Sadie

== Accolades ==
Year	Award	Category	Work	Result
2012	South by Southwest Film Festival	Special Jury Award	Starlet	Won
2013	Independent Spirit Robert Altman Award	Best Ensemble Cast	Starlet	Won
