= Sandiwara (film) =

- Release poster
- Directed by: Sean Baker
- Written by: Sean Baker
- Produced by: Alex Coco; Samantha Quan; Areta Mak
- Starring: Michelle Yeoh; Reuben Kang; Sunny Lau
- Cinematography: Christopher Ripley
- Edited by: Sean Baker
- Music by: Matthew Hearon-Smith
- Production companies: Superprime; Holy Momma
- Distributed by: YouTube
- Release dates: February 13, 2026 (Berlinale); February 20, 2026 (United States)
- Running time: 11 minutes
- Countries: United States; Malaysia
- Languages: Mandarin; English; Malay

Sandiwara is a 2026 short drama film written and directed by Sean Baker and starring Michelle Yeoh.

== Premise ==
Set in a Malaysian night market, follows five characters who each tell their own unique story and represent a facet of Malaysian culture rarely explored.

== Cast ==
- Michelle Yeoh as The Critic / The Hawker / The Waitress / The Vlogger / The Singer
- Reuben Kang as Vlogger Cameraman
- Sunny Lau as Singer

== Production ==
In December 2025, it was reported that Sean Baker wrote, directed, and shot a short film titled Sandiwara in Penang, starring Michelle Yeoh as five different characters. Baker shot the film with an iPhone. It is the first film produced in collaboration with the London-based fashion house Self Portrait.

== Release ==
Sandiwara premiered at the 76th Berlin International Film Festival on February 13, 2026, During the opening ceremony of the festival, Baker presented Yeoh with the Honorary Golden Bear. It was released on YouTube on February 20, 2026.
