= Prince of Broadway (film) =

2008 film

- Film poster
- Directed by: Sean Baker
- Written by: Sean Baker; Darren Dean
- Produced by: Sean Baker; Darren Dean
- Starring: Prince Adu; Karren Karagulian
- Cinematography: Sean Baker
- Edited by: Sean Baker
- Production company: Little Creature
- Distributed by: Cinedigm
- Release date: June 22, 2008 (Los Angeles Film Festival)
- Running time: 100 minutes
- Country: United States
- Language: English
- Budget: $45,000
- Box office: $20,450

Prince of Broadway is a 2008 American independent drama film written and directed by Sean Baker.

== Plot ==
Lucky (Adu) is a street-smart hustler working the streets of New York City, selling name brand knock-offs and turning a big profit. However, his life experiences a shake-up when his ex-girlfriend shows up with the son he never knew he had.

== Cast ==
- Prince Adu as Lucky
- Karren Karagulian as Levon Krikorian
- Aiden Noesi as Prince
- Keyali Mayaga as Karina
- Kat Sanchez as Linda
- Victoria Tate as Nadia

== Reception ==
The film has an 85% acceptance rating on review aggregator website Rotten Tomatoes with an average rating of 7.2/10 based on 20 reviews.

On Metacritic the film has a score of 61% based on 8 critics, indicating “generally favourable reviews”.
