= Starlet (film) =

2012 film

- Theatrical release poster
- Directed by: Sean Baker
- Written by: Sean Baker; Chris Bergoch
- Produced by: Blake Ashman; Sean Baker; Patrick Cunningham; Chris Maybach; Kevin Chinoy; Francesca Silvestri
- Starring: Dree Hemingway; Besedka Johnson; Stella Maeve; James Ransone; Karren Karagulian
- Cinematography: Radium Cheung
- Edited by: Sean Baker
- Music by: Manual
- Production companies: Maybach Cunningham; Freestyle Picture Company; Cre Film; Mangusta Productions
- Distributed by: Music Box Films
- Release dates: March 11, 2012 (SXSW); November 9, 2012 (United States)
- Running time: 103 minutes
- Country: United States
- Language: English
- Budget: $235,000
- Box office: $146,222

Starlet is a 2012 American independent drama film directed, edited, and co-produced by Sean Baker, who co-wrote the screenplay with Chris Bergoch. It explores the unlikely friendship that blossoms between a 21-year-old woman (Dree Hemingway) and an 85-year-old woman (Besedka Johnson) when their lives intersect in the San Fernando Valley.

Starlet premiered at the South by Southwest Film Festival on March 11, 2012. It received praise from critics and viewers, winning the Independent Spirit Robert Altman Award for Best Ensemble Cast whilst Johnson received Special Jury Recognition at the South by Southwest Film Festival. The film grossed $146,222 at the box office. It marks the first and only acting role for Johnson, who died one year after its release at the age of 87.

== Plot ==
Jane, also known as Tess, is a young woman who shares an apartment rented by Melissa and her boyfriend Mikey. Jane has a Xolo dog named Starlet.

Melissa tells Jane she cannot change the color of her room as she wishes because Mikey needs it for "shoots". Seeking change, Jane buys furniture at neighborhood yard sales. At one such sale she comes across an old woman named Sadie, from whom she buys a Thermos.

Back at her place, Jane discovers a stash of money in the Thermos. She spends some of it on extravagant luxuries, but decides to return the money to Sadie. The cranky older woman turns Jane away before she can explain. Despite Sadie's abrasiveness and resistance, Jane begins to form a friendship with her. She learns that the widow Sadie always loved Paris but has never been there. When Jane asks about her family, Sadie answers that she was married to a successful gambler, became a widow long ago and never had children. Jane becomes very attached to Sadie.

After an argument with her boss, Melissa is fired from her job where she, Mikey, and Jane are adult film stars. Jane convinces their boss to suspend Melissa for a month instead. Jane gets a promotion. Melissa's car is repossessed, but she gets it back from money doing "privates". One day, Jane leaves her dog Starlet with Sadie while she works at a porn convention. The dog gets loose, but Sadie eventually finds it.

Jane still has most of the money she found in the Thermos. When very drunk, Melissa advises her to spend it on "someone you care about," expecting that it would be spent on Melissa herself. Jane buys two first-class tickets to Paris and convinces Sadie to go with her. When Melissa learns that Jane spent all the money on Sadie, she is enraged. Melissa screams at Jane and kicks her out of the apartment. Jane contacts their boss, who provides her a room in a large house which serves as a dormitory for a stable of porn actresses.

In an act of revenge or as a way of feeling morally superior, Melissa tells Sadie about the stash of money. Sadie briefly unpacks her suitcase, but stops and gets ready to travel. Later, Jane, not knowing that Sadie has been told about the money, picks her up to go to the airport.

Sadie asks Jane to stop at the cemetery to leave flowers on her husband's grave. Jane notices the nearby grave of Sadie's daughter who died around age 18. She returns to the car, and the two drive away.

== Cast ==
- Dree Hemingway as Jane / Tess
- Besedka Johnson as Sadie Perkins
- Stella Maeve as Melissa
- James Ransone as Mikey
- Karren Karagulian as Arash
- Michael Adrienne O'Hagan as Janice
- Asa Akira as herself
- Manuel Ferrara as himself
- Lily Labeau as herself
- Kristina Rose as herself
- Zoe Voss as Jane / Tess's Body Double
- Jules Jordan as himself
- Boondock "Boonee" Baker as Starlet

== Production ==
Baker and Chris Bergoch collaborated on the screenplay for Starlet from November 2010 through summer 2011. Starlet began production in August 2011 and wrapped the following month. The film was shot entirely in Los Angeles.

== Release ==
Starlet premiered at the SXSW Film Festival on March 11, 2012 and had its international premiere in main competition at the Locarno International Film Festival in August 2012. It was released theatrically by Music Box Films on November 9, 2012.

== Reception ==
Rotten Tomatoes, a review aggregator, reports that 87% of 46 surveyed critics gave the film a positive review; the average rating was 7.3/10. Metacritic rated it 74/100 based on 19 reviews, indicating "generally favorable reviews".

Eric Kohn of IndieWire called Starlet a "provocative showcase for newcomer Dree Hemingway", and Peter Debruge of Variety called it "beautifully understated". The Hollywood Reporter added that it "pairs story and setting together perfectly". IndieWire's Katie Walsh wrote that the film "signals the arrival of Dree Hemingway as one to watch". Manohla Dargis of The New York Times made the film a "critic's pick" and described it as "a thrillingly, unexpectedly good American movie about love and a moral awakening".

== Accolades ==
The film won the Independent Spirit Robert Altman Award for Best Ensemble Cast at the 2013 Film Independent Spirit Awards. Besedka Johnson received Special Jury Recognition at the South by Southwest Film Festival.
