= Bryan Loves You =

- Theatrical release poster
- Directed by: Seth Landau
- Written by: Seth Landau
- Produced by: Seth Landau
- Starring: Seth Landau; George Wendt; Tiffany Shepis; Daniel Roebuck; Tony Todd
- Cinematography: Jayson Crothers
- Edited by: Greg Robbins
- Music by: P. Daniel Newman
- Distributed by: Anchor Bay
- Release date: September 23, 2008
- Running time: 92 minutes
- Country: United States
- Language: English
- Budget: $25,000

Bryan Loves You is a 2008 horror film directed by Seth Landau. The film relates the supposed true story of the Cult of the Bryans who took over a small Arizona town in 1993. It was shot in 17 days with a budget of $25,000. It was released on DVD on September 23, 2008 by Anchor Bay Entertainment.

== Plot ==
The plot revolves around a 32-year-old psychotherapist as he begins to suspect that the local religious cult has been murdering the town's citizens. He soon becomes sucked into a web of mysterious happenings, with the cult of the 'Bryans' being the focal point. The film uses the 'found footage' format, and claims that the film is a compilation of security footage.

== Cast ==
- Seth Landau as Jonathan
- George Wendt as Mr. Flynn
- Tiffany Shepis as Cindy
- Daniel Roebuck as Professor Spine
- Tony Todd as The Narrator
- Bobby Slayton as The Interviewer
- Brinke Stevens as Nurse
- Jilon VanOver as Brody
- Lloyd Kaufman as Jonathan's Helper

== Reception ==
Critical reception for the film has been mixed to negative, with Dread Central criticizing the film's lack of realism, saying "Watching “found footage” shouldn’t have the viewer asking questions like, “Why is everyone acting so overly evil?”" About.com's Mark Harris negatively reviewed the film, stating that "Bryan is mostly made up of drawn-out moments of inconsequential activity loosely tied together by a scenario that never delivers."

JoBlo.com reviewed the film positively, giving it three-and-half "Arrows in the Head", and writing that despite the film's resemblance to previous horror works such as Clockwork Orange, the movie "still feels fresh and inventive". MovieWeb called the film "a masterfully creepy ride through religious fundamentalism gone horribly awry".
