= The Man with the Bag (film) =

Upcoming American Christmas film

- Release poster
- Directed by: Adam Shankman
- Written by: Allan Rice
- Produced by: Lawrence Grey; Ben Everard; Reg Tigerman; Dan Spilo; Alan Ritchson
- Starring: Arnold Schwarzenegger; Alan Ritchson; Awkwafina; Liza Koshy; Kyle Mooney; Adrian Martinez; Jane Krakowski; Ken Jeong
- Cinematography: Jonathan Sela
- Music by: John Debney
- Production company: Grey Matter Productions
- Distributed by: Amazon MGM Studios (via Prime Video)
- Release date: December 2, 2026
- Country: United States
- Language: English

The Man with the Bag is an upcoming American Christmas action comedy film directed by Adam Shankman and written by Allan Rice. It stars Arnold Schwarzenegger, Alan Ritchson, Awkwafina, Liza Koshy, Kyle Mooney, Adrian Martinez, Jane Krakowski, and Ken Jeong.

The film is scheduled to be released on Amazon Prime Video on December 2, 2026.

== Premise ==
Santa Claus enlists the help of local criminal Vance after his sack of presents is stolen by a rogue and disgruntled elf, Swizzle, who is obsessed with shiny things. Vance and Santa pull off a dangerous heist to recover the bag and save Christmas.

== Cast ==
- Arnold Schwarzenegger as Santa Claus
- Alan Ritchson as Vance, a local thief
- Awkwafina as Swizzle, an elf who stole Santa's sack of presents
- Berkeley James as Emma, Vance's daughter
- Liza Koshy
- Kyle Mooney
- Ken Jeong
- Adrian Martinez
- Jane Krakowski
- Roger Bart
- Michael Cyril Creighton
- Karren Karagulian
- Murray Hill
- Gabi Samels
- Jameson Flynn Lopez
- Jesmille Darbouze
- Matty Cardarople as Joe, a stage manager

== Production ==
In June 2023, it was announced that The Man with the Bag would be directed by Adam Shankman from a screenplay by Allan Rice with Alan Ritchson starring. In March 2024, Arnold Schwarzenegger signed on to co-star with Amazon MGM Studios distributing.

Principal photography took place in late 2024 in Manhattan, New York with first-look images from filming appearing in the media in December 2024. In January 2025, Awkwafina, Liza Koshy, Kyle Mooney, Ken Jeong, Michael Cyril Creighton, Adrian Martinez, Roger Bart, Berkeley James, Jesmille Darbouze, Karren Karagulian, Gabi Samels, Jane Krakowski, and Murray Hill, were revealed as having joined the cast. Jonathan Sela served as the cinematographer.

In September 2025, John Debney was hired to compose the score. Debney had previously collaborated with Shankman for The Pacifier and Cheaper by the Dozen 2 (both 2005).

== Release ==
The Man with the Bag is scheduled to be released on Amazon Prime Video on December 2, 2026.

== Video game ==
On November 19, 2026 Amazon Game Studios published Amber's The Man with the Bag - Naughty or Nice on Amazon Luna, an AI driven video game starring Arnold Schwarzenegger (via an ai reacted voice, as well as a CGI likeness) as Santa Claus. In the game, the player must convince Santa that they are deserving of being on the nice list by coming up with their own stories and good deeds to try to convince him.
