= Four Letter Words =

2000 film

- Film poster
- Directed by: Sean Baker
- Written by: Sean Baker
- Produced by: Koorosh Yaraghi
- Starring: David Ari; Henry Beylin; Fred Berman; Darcy Bledsoe
- Cinematography: Sam Selva
- Edited by: Sean Baker; Lannie Lorence
- Production company: Littlefilms
- Release date: August 2000 (B-Movie Film Festival)
- Running time: 82 minutes
- Country: United States
- Language: English
- Budget: $80,000

Four Letter Words (also known as Climax) is a 2000 American comedy film written and directed by Sean Baker in his directorial debut.

== Plot ==
A study of the post-adolescent male psyche, the film gives an often humorous but raw unadulterated look at the views, attitudes, and language of young men in the suburban U.S.

== Production ==
Some scenes were filmed in Basking Ridge, New Jersey.

== Reception ==
Four Letter Words screened at the SXSW Film Festival in 2001.

DVD Talk stated "Although Baker shows a pretty good ear for dialog and a willingness to keep things lively in the editing room, and despite the best efforts of a quality cast, the movie never quite inspires. A bunch of guys standing around a garage talking about porn stars or bong hits may feel important to the filmmaker and might find a cult audience but the filmmaker would be better served finding a more original outlet for his storytelling talents. Still, fans of ultra-indie films might want to give this one a shot. It's got some good qualities and some nice performances."
