= Laura Colella =

Laura Colella is a film maker who wrote and directed Stay Until Tomorrow (2004) and Breakfast with Curtis (2012).
