= Sean Baker =

American filmmaker (born 1971)

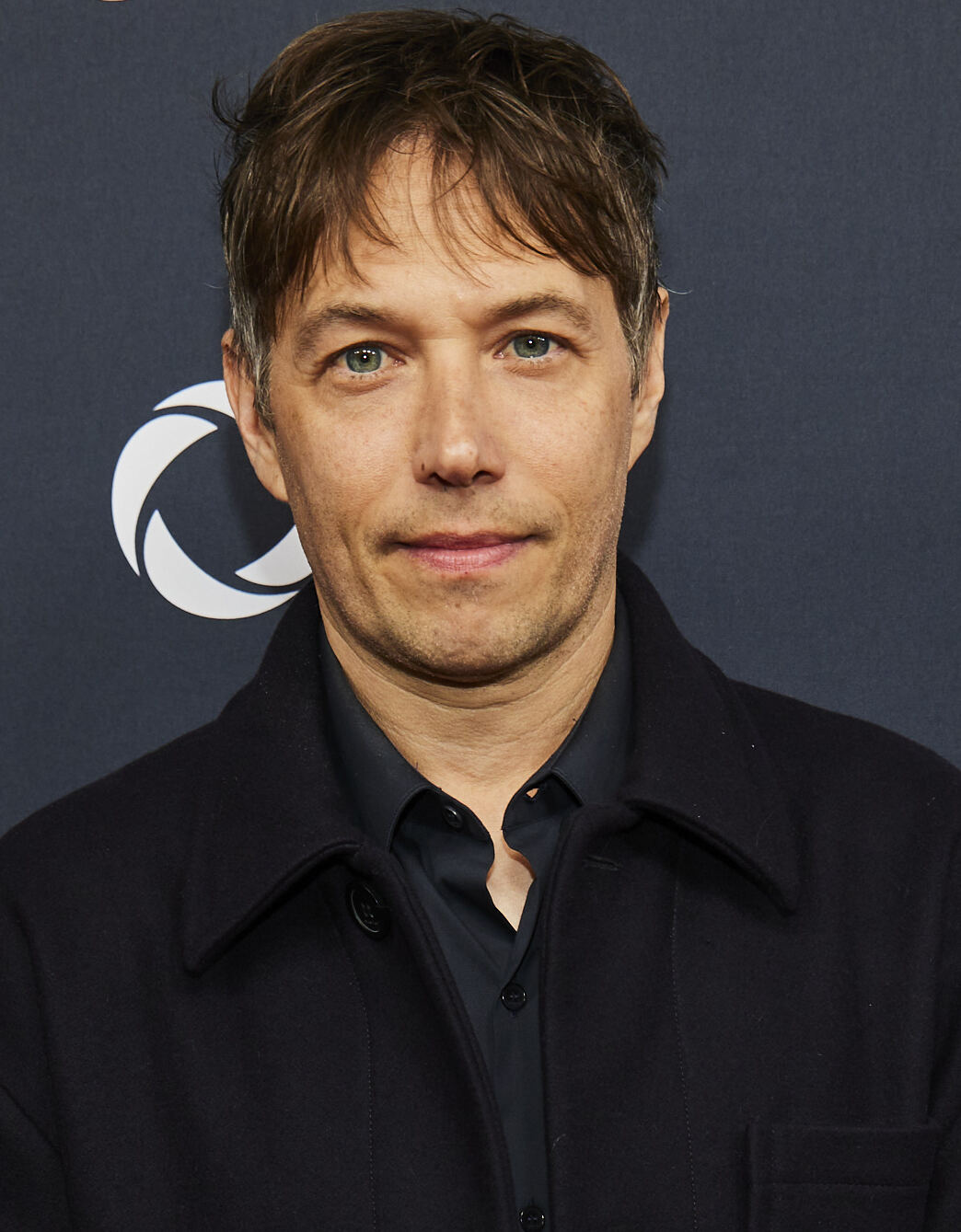
- Baker in 2024
- Born: Sean S. Baker; February 26, 1971 (age 55); Summit, New Jersey, U.S.
- Education: New York University (BFA)
- Occupations: Filmmaker; editor
- Years active: 2000–present
- Spouse: Samantha Quan

Sean Baker (born February 26, 1971) is an American filmmaker. He is a director, writer, editor, cinematographer and producer of independent narrative feature films which are most often about the lives of marginalized people, especially immigrants and sex workers. He made his directorial film debut with Four Letter Words (2000) and co-created the television character Greg the Bunny. Baker has since directed seven feature films: Take Out (2004), Prince of Broadway (2008), Starlet (2012), Tangerine (2015), The Florida Project (2017), Red Rocket (2021), and Anora (2024).

Baker has received various accolades throughout his career including four Academy Awards, a BAFTA Award, a Critics' Choice Award and three Independent Spirit Awards. For Anora, he won the Palme d'Or at Cannes, and, alongside his wife Samantha Quan, he won the British Academy Film Award for Best Casting, before proceeding to win Best Picture, Best Director, Best Original Screenplay and Best Film Editing at the 97th Academy Awards. He is the first person to individually win four Oscars for the same film in a single ceremony. (Note: Walt Disney also won four awards at a single ceremony, but those Oscars were for four different films. Baker's were for the same film. For Parasite, Bong Joon Ho also received four Oscars, but according to the Academy, one of them (Best International Feature Film) is considered a collective award for the submitting country, the director, and the film creatives as a whole.)

== Early life and education ==
Baker was born in Summit, New Jersey. He grew up in the Short Hills area of Millburn and in Branchburg, New Jersey. His mother was a teacher and his father was a patent attorney, who once represented Baker and his production company in a dispute over the title of his film Take Out. Baker has a sister, a professional synth-pop musician and a production designer, who has contributed to his films in both capacities.

Baker became obsessed with homemade movies at a young age after his mother took him to see Universal Monster films being shown at the local library. While attending Gill St. Bernard's High School ('89) in Somerset and Morris counties, Baker worked as a projectionist at the Wellmont Theater in Montclair. He worked as a taxi driver during his college years. He received his BFA degree in film studies from New York University through the Tisch School of the Arts. He was scheduled to receive his degree in 1992, but dropped out to get experience making industrial films and TV commercials before returning to graduate in 1998. He also studied non-linear editing at The New School in Greenwich Village in Manhattan.

== Career ==
=== 2000–2014: Directorial debut and early work ===
Baker's first feature film was Four Letter Words (2000), a film revolving around the looks, views, attitudes, and language of young men in America starring David Ari, Henry Beylin, Fred Berman and Darcy Bledsoe. He wrote, directed, and edited the film. Baker is one of the original creators of the sitcom Greg the Bunny (2002–2006), starring Seth Green and Eugene Levy. It is based on a series of short segments which Baker directed and wrote. The series aired on the Independent Film Channel and was in turn derived from a public-access television show called Junktape. In 2010, Baker, Spencer Chinoy, and Dan Milano created a spinoff called Warren the Ape; the series aired on MTV and was canceled after one season.

Baker made Take Out (2004), which he co-wrote, co-directed, co-edited, and co-produced with frequent collaborator Shih-Ching Tsou on a budget of $3000. The film revolves around an undocumented Chinese immigrant falling behind on payments on a smuggling debt, leaving him only one day to come up with the money. The film's world premiere was at the Slamdance Film Festival in Los Angeles on January 18, 2004. After it was screened at over 25 film festivals, a legal dispute with Seth Landau, who was planning to release a film with the same name, delayed its release until June 6, 2008.

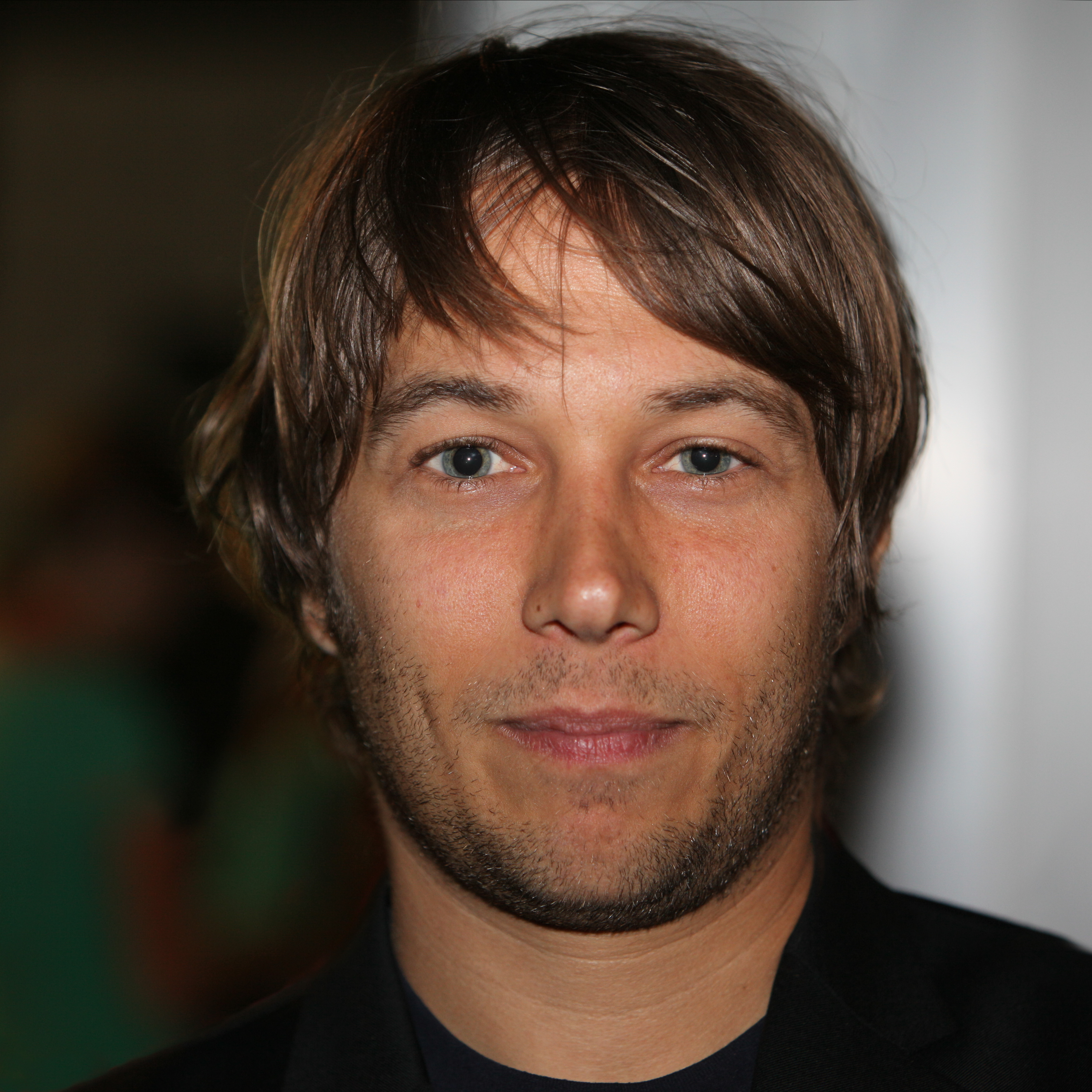
Baker at KVIFF 2009

Baker's third feature film, Prince of Broadway, premiered at the Los Angeles Film Festival on June 22, 2008. The film follows a Ghanaian immigrant selling knock-off merchandise in Manhattan who discovers that he has a son. He directed, wrote, co-produced, shot, and edited the film. Baker also self-financed the distribution and advertising of the film. Take Out and Prince of Broadway were nominated for the Independent Spirit John Cassavetes Award at the same ceremony in 2008.

Beginning in 2009, he co-wrote a Brighton Beach-set film with star-collaborator Karren Karagulian which was not produced. Karagulian described it as a "buddy-buddy kind of story". Baker's then-agent shopped their script around to producers: "[T]hey were like, 'Yeah, we're going to make it. It's going to be $15–20 million and we're going to have Ryan Gosling and Tom Hardy play Russians.' I was like, 'Whoa, wait a minute. First off, no. I don't want that at all. That's not the way I make movies. Plus, did you forget that I wrote this for Karren?'" To Baker's relief, they couldn't raise the money for the film—which would eventually evolve into Anora, which included Brighton Beach as a setting. At the 2010 San Diego Comic-Con, it was announced that Baker, Alex Rivera, Tze Chun and Barry Jenkins would each direct segments of the portmanteau film A Contract with God, based upon the graphic novel of the same name by Will Eisner. The individual chapters were "A Contract with God", "The Street Singer", "The Super", and "Cookalien". It was never made.

Baker next directed Starlet, which was co-written with Chris Bergoch, and stars Dree Hemingway and Besedka Johnson. Starlet explores the unlikely friendship between 21-year-old Jane (Hemingway) and 85-year-old Sadie (Johnson), two women whose lives intersect in California's San Fernando Valley. The world premiere for the film was at SXSW on March 11, 2012 and it was given a limited release on November 9, 2012.

=== 2015–2022: Breakthrough and acclaim ===
Baker's next film, Tangerine, centers a transgender sex worker who discovers that her boyfriend and pimp has been cheating on her. The film was shot using three iPhone 5S smartphones and was praised for its groundbreaking filmmaking techniques. Tangerine features performers Kitana Kiki Rodriguez, Mya Taylor, Karren Karagulian, Mickey O'Hagan, and James Ransone. Mark Duplass and Jay Duplass were the executive producers. Baker co-wrote the script with Bergoch; Baker co-produced, co-shot, and edited the film. It premiered at the 2015 Sundance Film Festival on January 23, 2015, and was given a limited release on July 10, 2015. It received positive reviews and holds a 96% rating on Rotten Tomatoes.

In 2016, Baker directed Snowbird, a short fashion film starring model Abbey Lee for Kenzo. It was also shot only using iPhones. His sixth major feature film, The Florida Project, premiered in the Directors' Fortnight section of the 2017 Cannes Film Festival and was theatrically released in the United States on October 6, 2017, by A24. Baker edited the film and co-wrote the script with his frequent collaborator Chris Bergoch. The plot follows a 6-year-old girl living in a motel with her rebellious mother in Greater Orlando as they try to stay out of trouble and make ends meet. The film was praised for its performances (particularly that of Willem Dafoe as the motel manager and Brooklynn Prince as Moonee, a six-year-old girl) as well as for Baker's direction, and was chosen by both the National Board of Review and the American Film Institute as one of the top 10 films of the year. Dafoe earned Best Supporting Actor nominations at the Oscars, Golden Globes and BAFTA Awards, and Prince won the Critics Choice Movie Award for Best Young Performer. In June 2018, Baker was invited to be a member of the directors and writers branch of the Academy of Motion Picture Arts and Sciences. In October 2018, he was the head of the film jury at the Mumbai International Film Festival in Mumbai, India.

I am an ally and have literally devoted my career to tell stories that remove stigma and normalize lifestyles that are under attack. I would never do anything that could possibly hurt the community.

— Baker in Los Angeles Times, August 28, 2020

In March 2021, Baker released the short film Khaite FW21, produced for fashion line Khaite to promote its Fall/Winter 2021 lineup. Sean Price Williams was the cinematographer. Baker directed the feature film Red Rocket, which stars Simon Rex as Mikey, a pornographic actor returning to his hometown in Texas. Baker directed, co-wrote and co-produced the film with his usual team of Bergoch and Tsou among others. Filming took place in secret amidst the COVID-19 pandemic, but "industry-standard safety protocols" were observed. The film received a standing ovation at the 2021 Cannes Film Festival. It was released in the US by A24 on December 10. In 2023, Baker was the executive producer on Love in the Time of Fentanyl, a documentary which premiered at the DOXA Documentary Film Festival in May 2022.

=== 2023–present: Anora and accolades ===
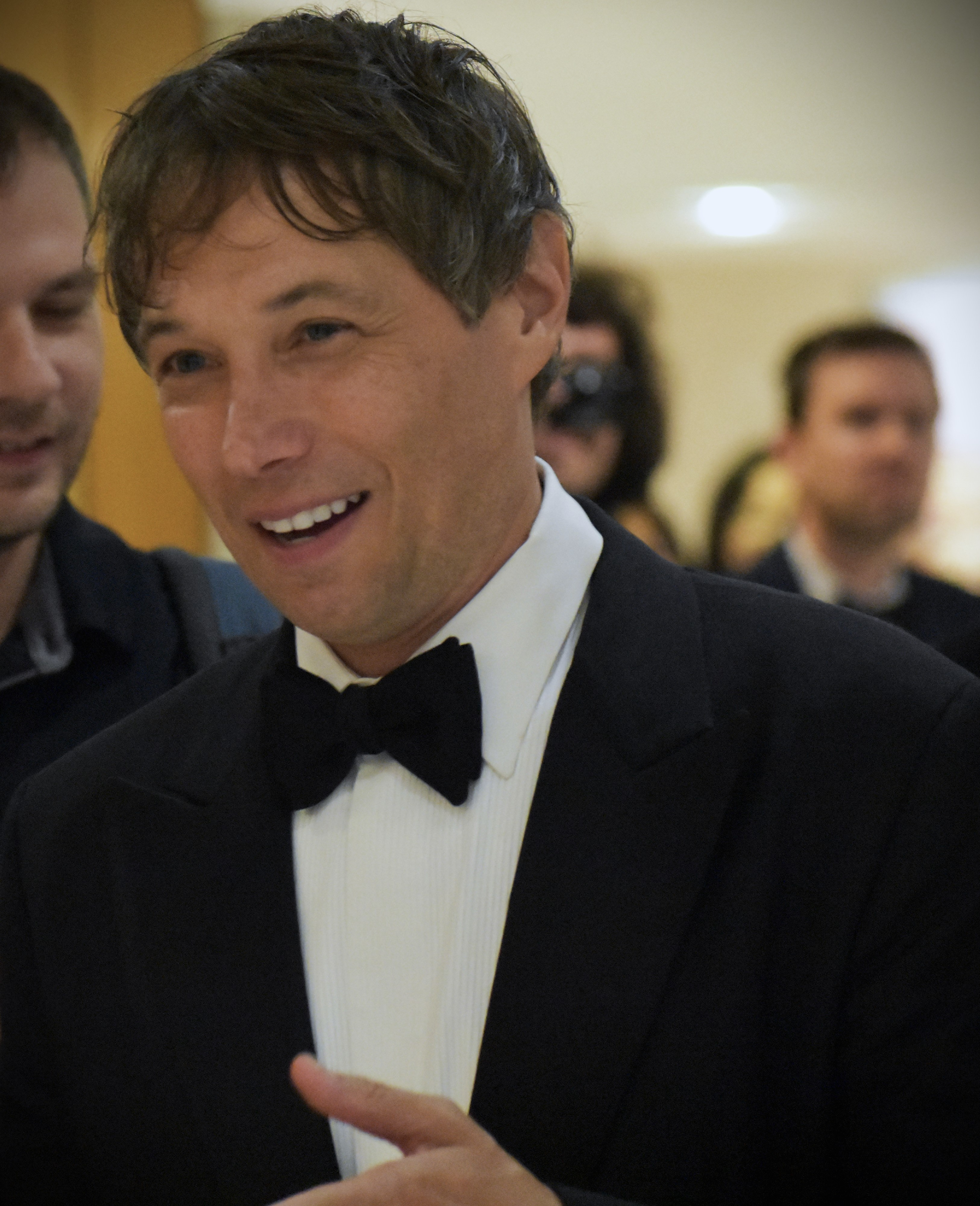
Baker at the Cannes Film Festival in 2024

In October 2023, his next feature film Anora, starring Mikey Madison, was officially announced after distribution rights were acquired by FilmNation. At a press conference during the 2024 Cannes Film Festival, where the film premiered, Baker spoke about the topic of intimacy coordinators: "I think with intimacy coordination, it's a case-by-case basis, film by film basis. If an actor requests one, 100% ... but I have directed approximately 10 sex scenes throughout my career, and I'm very comfortable doing so. It is our No. 1 priority to keep our actors safe, protected, comfortable and involved in the process". For Anora, Baker became the first American director to win the Palme d'Or since Terrence Malick in 2011. In 2025, Baker won the Academy Awards for Best Picture, Best Director, Best Original Screenplay, and Best Editing. He matched Walt Disney's record for most Oscars won by a single person in one night and became the first person to win four Oscars for a single film.

Baker served as co-writer, producer and editor on Left-Handed Girl directed by frequent collaborator Shih-Ching Tsou, which premiered at the 2025 Cannes Film Festival in the Critics' Week section. The film won Baker Best Editing at the 28th Taipei Film Awards. In November 2025, it was announced that Baker would serve as the jury president for Saudi Arabia's fifth Red Sea International Film Festival.

In 2026, during an interview promoting short film Sandiwara, Baker said, after his success with Anora: "I was offered development deals, but I very much want to make my films independently... [W]e are making our film independently so that I can retain full control in terms of everything from casting to content, and not even have to take one note." During CinemaCon 2026, Warner Bros. Pictures CEOs Michael De Luca and Pamela Abdy, officially announced Baker's Ti Amo! for 2027, as a part of its new specialized label focused on indie films, now named Warner Bros. Clockwork.

== Prospective projects ==
With regards to developing multiple projects at the same time, Baker has stated he "can't creatively juggle." He elaborated that after the success of The Florida Project, he received offers from various studios and producers. "I was actually feeling very torn because I literally could not focus on one project while trying to develop [another]." Encouraged by advice from Danish filmmaker Lars von Trier, Baker left a television series that had been greenlit and began working on his next film instead, which was then cancelled as result of the COVID-19 pandemic. The latter was described as an "ambitious" character-driven drama set against the backdrop of the opioid epidemic in Vancouver.. Baker likened the project to the 2008 biopic Milk. "It's too big of a movie. ... I need[ed] hundreds of people to be on the street, marching and stuff, and that [couldn't] happen." Despite this, he intends to revisit the subject of drug usage for a future project.

In August 2018, Baker mused shooting another project back-to-back as the planned drug activist film. Little else is known other than that he expected to write it with co-collaborator Chris Bergoch, and that it would be a contemporary piece potentially set outside the U.S. He explained that while the setting might be international, the film would still serve as a commentary on American issues. Baker also revealed ambitions to someday direct an action film, emphasizing the need for a strong script that would combine action with socio-political themes, and cited Sorcerer as a model example.

In August 2020, actress Bella Thorne announced that Baker would be directing a documentary about her experiences opening an OnlyFans account, but he quickly halted talks as Thorne's suspicious behavior was blamed for restrictions affecting all sex workers on the site. As of December 2021, Baker was reportedly prepping a potential television series spinoff of his 2015 film Tangerine. He was inspired to do a TV show version of Tangerine as a way to help propel the career of trans actress Mya Taylor, who would play the lead in the project. In terms of franchise films, Baker has expressed interest in Fast & Furious, stating that he would jump at the chance to direct one because he'd "be able to play with cars and crashes." In July 2023, Baker stated that a "career goal" of his was to make a star vehicle for erotic film actress Laura Gemser, and cast her in a leading role.

In 2025, when asked about the status of his next film after Anora, Baker expressed uncertainty, saying that he was "exploring" multiple possibilities; before eventually settling on Ti Amo!.

== Personal life ==
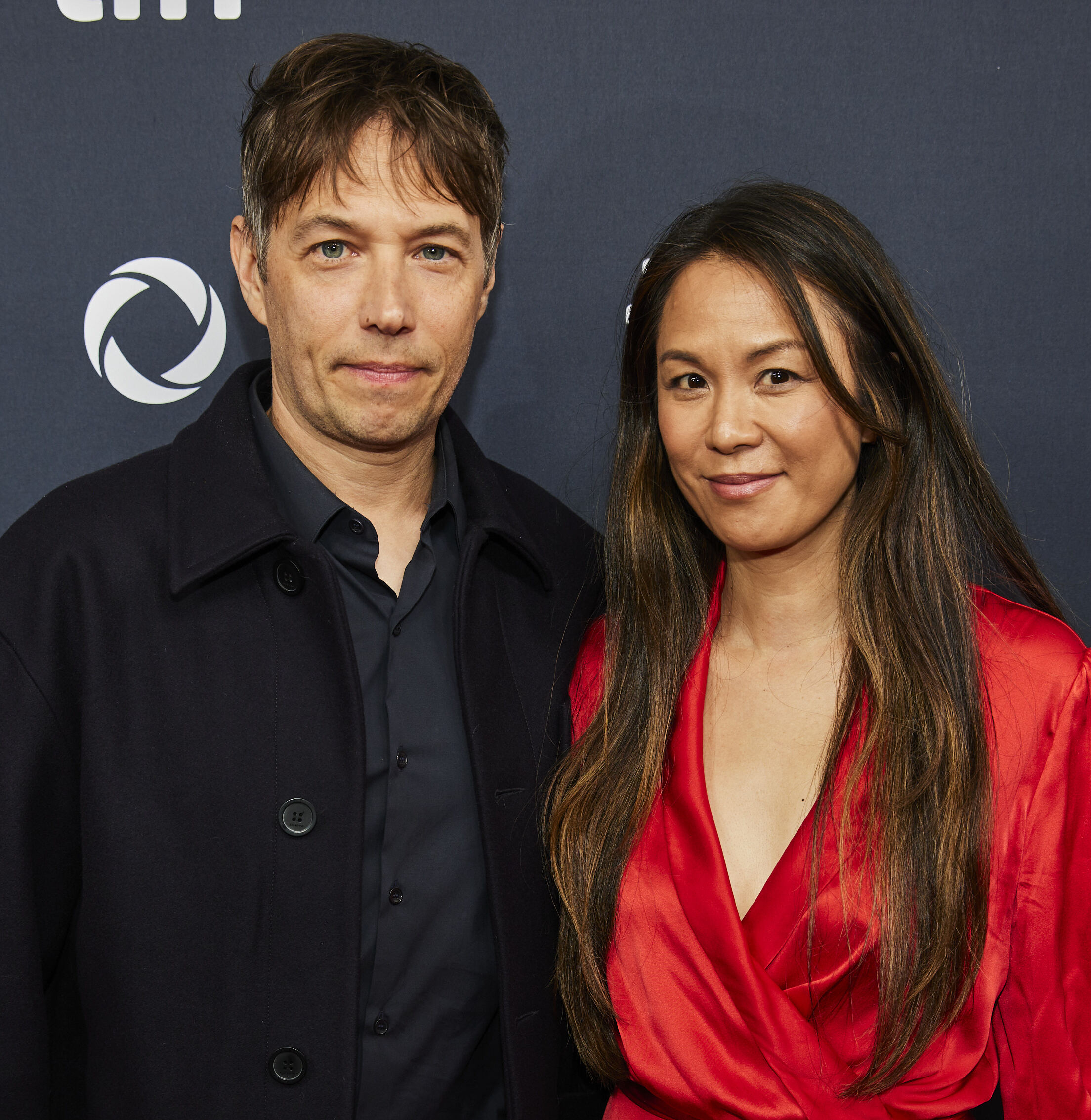
Baker with wife Samantha Quan at TIFF 2024 in Toronto for the premiere of Anora

Baker is married to Samantha Quan, a producer on three of his films. As of July 2021, they had two dogs, Bunsen and Boonee, the latter of whom played the titular character in his 2012 film Starlet. Boonee died in 2023.

Baker said at a 2024 press conference in Cannes, France, that he believes sex work should be "decriminalized and not in any way regulated, because it's a sex worker's body and it's up to them to decide how they will use it in their livelihood." Baker was an opioid addict in his 20s.

== Style and influences ==
Baker has established a reputation for portraying outcasts and characters from underrepresented and marginalized subcultures, frequently undocumented immigrants and sex workers, in decidedly humane and compassionate scenarios. His films have stirred and encouraged a debate about sexual morality. Baker has never used intimacy coordinators on the sets of his films. On the set of Anora, instead of using an intimacy coordinator, Baker and his wife, Samantha Quan, would talk about different sexual positions and act them out in front of the actors.

Baker's influences include Ken Loach, Spike Lee, Federico Fellini, Jim Jarmusch, Mike Leigh, Steven Spielberg, Éric Rohmer, Lars Von Trier, John Cassavetes, and Hal Ashby, among others. Baker has said that he consciously includes Easter egg references to other movies in his filmography. For example, a billboard advertising a performance by the character named Strawberry from Red Rocket can be seen near the end of Anora.

== Filmography ==
=== Films ===
Year	Title	Director	Writer	Producer	Editor	DoP	Notes
2000	Four Letter Words	Yes	Yes	No	Yes	No	
2004	Take Out	Yes	Yes	Yes	Yes	Yes	Co-directed with Shih-Ching Tsou
2008	Prince of Broadway	Yes	Yes	Yes	Yes	Yes	
2012	Starlet	Yes	Yes	Yes	Yes	No	
2015	Tangerine	Yes	Yes	Yes	Yes	Yes	
2017	The Florida Project	Yes	Yes	Yes	Yes	No	
2021	Red Rocket	Yes	Yes	Yes	Yes	No	
2024	Anora	Yes	Yes	Yes	Yes	No	
2025	Left-Handed Girl	No	Yes	Yes	Yes	No	

Executive producer only

- Love in the Time of Fentanyl (2022)
- The Feeling That the Time for Doing Something Has Passed (2023)
- Modern Whore (2025)

Short films

Year	Title	Director	Writer	Producer	Editor
2016	Snowbird	Yes	Yes	Yes	Yes
2021	Khaite FW21	Yes	No	No	Yes
2026	Sandiwara	Yes	Yes	No	Yes

=== Television ===
Year	Title	Director	Writer	Producer	Creator	Role
2002–2006	Greg the Bunny	Yes	Yes	No	Yes	Also editor and cinematographer
2010	Warren the Ape	Yes	Yes	Yes	Yes	

== Recurring collaborators ==
Baker is known to re-cast previous actors in his films, in both main and supporting roles. Some crew members appear in cameos in his later films.

Recurring actors
Actor	Films								Total
Actor	Four Letter Words	Take Out	Prince of Broadway	Starlet	Tangerine	The Florida Project	Red Rocket	Anora	Total
Paul Weissman	Yes							Yes	2
Vincent Radwinsky	Yes							Yes	2
Karren Karagulian	Yes	Yes	Yes	Yes	Yes	Yes	Yes	Yes	8
Artyom Trubnikov	Yes							Yes	2
Charles Jang		Yes						Yes	2
Baqi Abdush-Shaheed		Yes	Yes						2
Tony Roach		Yes	Yes						2
Victoria Tate			Yes	Yes					2
Edward Pagan			Yes			Yes			2
Michael Sergio			Yes					Yes	2
Kurt Leitner			Yes	Yes					2
Chris Bergoch			Yes	Yes	Yes				3
Mickey O’Hagan			Yes	Yes	Yes			Yes	4
James Ransone				Yes	Yes				2
Jonathan Stromberg				Yes	Yes				2
Josh Sussman				Yes	Yes				2
Shih-Ching Tsou					Yes	Yes	Yes		3
Brittney Rodriguez							Yes	Yes	2

== Awards and nominations ==
Award	Date of ceremony	Category	Work	Result	Ref.
Independent Spirit Awards	February 21, 2009	John Cassavetes Award	Take Out	Nominated	
Independent Spirit Awards	February 21, 2009	John Cassavetes Award	Prince of Broadway	Nominated	
Independent Spirit Awards	February 23, 2013	Robert Altman Award	Starlet	Won	
Independent Spirit Awards	February 23, 2013	John Cassavetes Award	Starlet	Nominated	
Independent Spirit Awards	February 27, 2016	Best Director	Tangerine	Nominated	
Independent Spirit Awards	March 3, 2018	Best Director	The Florida Project	Nominated	
Independent Spirit Awards	February 22, 2025	Best Feature	Anora	Won	
Independent Spirit Awards	February 22, 2025	Best Director	Anora	Won	
Satellite Awards	February 11, 2018	Best Director	The Florida Project	Nominated	
Satellite Awards	February 11, 2018	Best Original Screenplay	The Florida Project	Nominated	
Detroit Film Critics Society	December 7, 2017	Director of the Year	The Florida Project	Won	
New York Film Critics Circle	November 30, 2017	Best Director	The Florida Project	Won	
New York Film Critics Circle	January 8, 2024	Best Screenplay	Anora	Won	
Chicago Film Critics Association	December 12, 2017	Best Editing	The Florida Project	Nominated	
London Film Critics' Circle	January 28, 2018	Director of the Year	The Florida Project	Won	
Los Angeles Film Critics Association	December 8, 2024	Best Director	Anora	Runner-up	
Los Angeles Film Critics Association	December 8, 2024	Best Screenplay	Anora	Runner-up	
Dorian Awards	January 31, 2018	Director of the Year	The Florida Project	Nominated	
Provincetown International Film Festival	June 16, 2018	Filmmaker on the Edge Award	—N/a	Honored	
Detroit Film Critics Society	December 6, 2021	Best Director	Red Rocket	Nominated	
Gotham Awards	November 29, 2021	Best Screenplay	Red Rocket	Nominated	
Chicago Film Critics Association	December 15, 2021	Best Original Screenplay	Red Rocket	Nominated	
Cannes Film Festival	May 25, 2024	Palme d'Or	Anora	Won	
Imagine Film Festival	November 2, 2024	Silver Scream Award	Anora	Won	
Gotham Awards	December 2, 2024	Best Feature	Anora	Nominated	
Gotham Awards	December 2, 2024	Best Director	Anora	Nominated	
Capri Hollywood International Film Festival	January 2, 2025	Best Original Screenplay	Anora	Won	
Golden Globe Awards	January 5, 2025	Best Director	Anora	Nominated	
Golden Globe Awards	January 5, 2025	Best Screenplay	Anora	Nominated	
Critics' Choice Awards	February 7, 2025	Best Picture	Anora	Won	
Critics' Choice Awards	February 7, 2025	Best Director	Anora	Nominated	
Critics' Choice Awards	February 7, 2025	Best Original Screenplay	Anora	Nominated	
Critics' Choice Awards	February 7, 2025	Best Film Editing	Anora	Nominated	
Directors Guild of America Awards	February 8, 2025	Outstanding Director – Feature Film	Anora	Won	
Producers Guild of America Awards	February 8, 2025	Best Theatrical Motion Picture	Anora	Won	
AACTA International Awards	February 11, 2025	Best Screenplay	Anora	Nominated	
Writers Guild of America Awards	February 15, 2025	Best Original Screenplay	Anora	Won	
BAFTA Awards	February 16, 2025	Best Picture	Anora	Nominated	
BAFTA Awards	February 16, 2025	Best Director	Anora	Nominated	
BAFTA Awards	February 16, 2025	Best Original Screenplay	Anora	Nominated	
BAFTA Awards	February 16, 2025	Best Casting	Anora	Won	
BAFTA Awards	February 16, 2025	Best Editing	Anora	Nominated	
Academy Awards	March 2, 2025	Best Picture	Anora	Won	
Academy Awards	March 2, 2025	Best Director	Anora	Won	
Academy Awards	March 2, 2025	Best Original Screenplay	Anora	Won	
Academy Awards	March 2, 2025	Best Film Editing	Anora	Won	
David di Donatello Awards	May 7, 2025	Best International Film	Anora	Won	
Golden Horse Awards	November 22, 2025	Best Original Screenplay	Left-Handed Girl	Nominated	
Golden Horse Awards	November 22, 2025	Best Film Editing	Left-Handed Girl	Nominated	
Taipei Film Awards	July 12, 2026	Best Screenplay	Left-Handed Girl	Nominated	
Taipei Film Awards	July 12, 2026	Best Editing	Left-Handed Girl	Won	

Directed Academy Award performances
Under Baker's direction, these actors have received Academy Award nominations (and one win) for their performances in their respective roles.

Year	Performer	Film	Result
Academy Award for Best Actress
2024	Mikey Madison	Anora	Won
Academy Award for Best Supporting Actor
2017	Willem Dafoe	The Florida Project	Nominated
2024	Yura Borisov	Anora	Nominated
