= Samantha Quan =

Canadian film producer

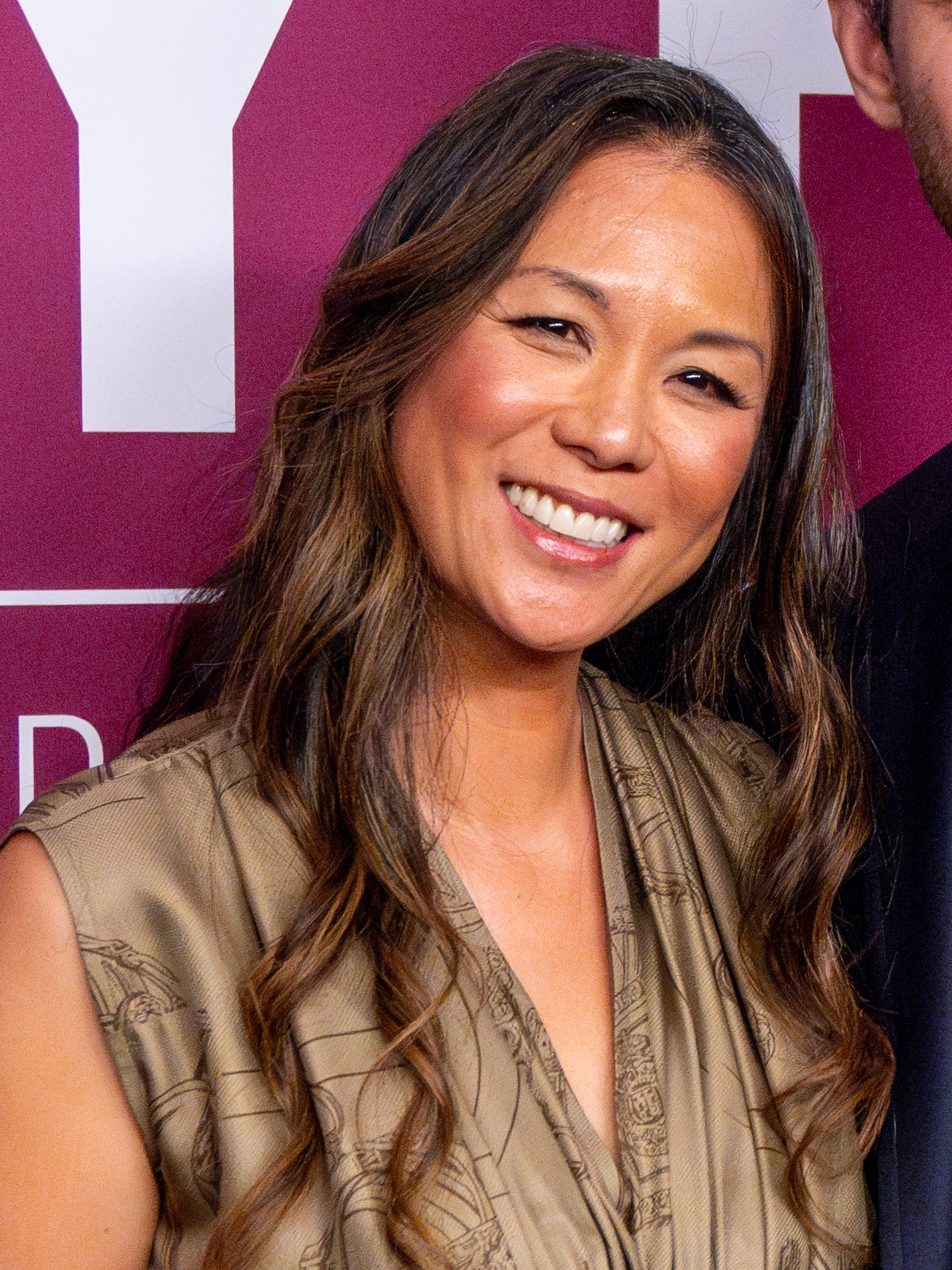
- Quan at the New York Film Festival, 2024
- Born: September 2, 1975 (age 50); Vancouver, British Columbia, Canada
- Occupations: Film producer, actress
- Years active: 1997–present
- Spouse: Sean Baker

Samantha Quan (born September 2, 1975) is a Canadian independent film producer and actress. She is best known for producing the films Red Rocket (2021) and Anora (2024), which were directed by her husband Sean Baker. The latter won Quan the Academy Award for Best Picture.

== Early life and education ==
Samantha Quan was born on September 2, 1975, in Vancouver. Growing up, her father owned a Chinese restaurant.

In 1998, Quan graduated from the University of British Columbia with a Bachelor of Arts in Theater. She graduated with an MFA from the New York University Tisch School of the Arts in 2001.

== Career ==
As an actress, Quan has played minor roles on various television shows. She received praise for her theatre role as Huong in the stage play Poor Yella Rednecks by Qui Nguyen. She was instrumental in providing three weeks of acting classes to Bria Vinaite prior to filming The Florida Project, owing to the latter having no prior acting experience. Quan was on set throughout filming and would work with Vinaite at the end of each shooting day. Vinaite's performance was lauded as a breakout, receiving multiple film critics nominations.

In 2025, Quan won a PGA Award for producing Anora alongside Baker and Alex Coco. All three later won the Academy Award for Best Picture, and the BAFTA Award for Best Film. Quan also won the Critics Choice Association's Celebration of Asian Pacific Cinema and Television Producer Award for her work on Anora.

At a press conference at Cannes Film Festival, Mikey Madison said that Baker and Quan would act out different sex positions to demonstrate what they wanted the actors to do. This led to a conversation in the press about the relevance and importance of intimacy coordinators in film that generated some controversy.

== Personal life ==
She is married to director Sean Baker, and produced several of his films.

== Filmography ==
=== As producer ===
Year	Film	Director	Notes
2017	The Florida Project	Sean Baker	Associate producer
2021	Red Rocket	Sean Baker	
2024	Anora	Sean Baker	
2026	Sandiwara	Sean Baker	

=== As actress ===
Year	Title	Role	Notes
1997	Breaker High	Pretty Girl	1 episode
2003	How to Lose a Guy in 10 Days	Lori	
2004	CSI: NY	Joanne Cho	1 episode
2008	CSI: Miami	Jane Bartlett	4 episodes
2008	House	Nicole	1 episode
2008	Grey's Anatomy	Shelly	1 episode
2010	NCIS: Los Angeles	Diane Vincent	1 episode
2010	Castle	Kathleen Park	1 episode
2011	Bones	Misty Clemmons	1 episode
2013	The Mentalist	Megan Parker	1 episode
2016–2018	Elementary	Lin Wen	5 episodes
2020	Home Before Dark	Winnie Witherspoon	3 episodes
