= Breakfast with Curtis =

- Film poster
- Directed by: Laura Colella
- Written by: Laura Colella
- Produced by: Laura Colella; Michael Jackman
- Starring: Jonah Parker; Theo Green; David A. Parker
- Cinematography: Laura Colella
- Release date: June 17, 2012 (LA Film Festival)
- Country: United States
- Language: English

Breakfast with Curtis is a 2012 American film written and directed by Laura Colella. The film premiered at the 2012 LA Film Festival.
