= Seth Landau =

American actor

Seth Landau is an actor/writer/director and former newspaper reporter for The Arizona Republic and New Times. Landau is known for two independent films, Take Out and A.P.U.: Art, Pot and Underwear. The former, "Take Out", was the target of a locally publicized dispute regarding Sean Baker and Shih-Ching Tsou's film of the same name. Landau also directed the 2008 horror film Bryan Loves You.

Landau was born in Fresh Meadows, Queens, New York. In 1988, he moved with his mother to Arizona after his parents divorced. In 2000, he worked as a reporter in Houston, Texas.
