= Take Out (2004 film) =

2004 film

- Theatrical release poster
- Directed by: Sean Baker; Shih-Ching Tsou
- Written by: Sean Baker; Shih-Ching Tsou
- Produced by: Sean Baker; Shih-Ching Tsou
- Starring: Charles Jang; Jeng-Hua Yu; Wang-Thye Lee; Justin Wan
- Cinematography: Sean Baker
- Edited by: Sean Baker; Shih-Ching Tsou
- Production company: Cre Film
- Distributed by: CAVU Pictures
- Release dates: January 18, 2004 (Slamdance); June 6, 2008 (United States)
- Running time: 90 minutes
- Country: United States
- Languages: Mandarin; English
- Budget: $3,000
- Box office: $69,816

Take Out is a 2004 American independent drama film written and directed by Sean Baker and Shih-Ching Tsou. Tsou's co-directorial debut feature and Baker's second work, the film follows an undocumented Chinese immigrant working as a deliveryman for a Chinese take-out shop in New York City.

Take Out initially premiered at the Slamdance Film Festival in January 2004, but did not see a wider release until 2008. It received acclaim from critics, and holds a 100% rating on film aggregation website Rotten Tomatoes.

== Plot ==
Take Out is a day-in-the-life of Ming Ding, an undocumented Chinese immigrant working as a deliveryman for a Chinese take-out shop in New York City. Ming is behind with payments on his huge debt to the smugglers who brought him to the United States. The collectors have given him until the end of the day to deliver the money that is due. After borrowing most of the money from friends and relatives, Ming realizes that the remainder must come from the day's delivery tips. In order to do so, he must make more than double his average daily income.

== Cast ==
- Charles Jang as Ming Ding - A determined, reticent delivery man who is racing against time to come up with the late payment owed to snakehead smugglers. Ming came to the United States with the goal of creating a better future for his wife and child back in China.
- Jeng-Hua Yu as Young - A fellow delivery man and Ming's closest friend at the take-out. Young is a happy-go-lucky slacker who provides comic relief to the mundane work day. He is the only one at the take-out who is aware of Ming's dilemma.
- Wang-Thye Lee as Big Sister - The cashier and managerial figure of the take-out. Big Sister is a spunky woman with street smarts who juggles the orders and operations of the take-out.
- Justin Wan as Wei - A cook at the take-out who has been in the country longer than most of the others. Wei's sense of seniority frequently lands him in minor disagreements of opinion and power with the other workers.

== Style ==
In a social-realist style, the camera follows Ming on his deliveries throughout the upper Manhattan neighborhood where social and economic extremes exist side by side. Intercutting between Ming's deliveries and the daily routine of the restaurant, Take Out presents a harshly real look at the daily lives of illegal Chinese immigrants in New York City. Baker said, "We were heavily influenced by cinema verite."

Baker also referenced Lars von Trier's 1998 film The Idiots as an influence, which he has also mentioned often as one of his favorite films, as well as citing the film movement Dogme 95 in general, which was founded by Trier and Thomas Vinterberg.

== Production ==
Take Out was filmed in and near Upper Manhattan, New York, in the spring of 2003 on a budget of $3,000. The film was shot on digital video due to both the cinema vérité style and a non-existent budget with an ensemble cast of both professional and nonprofessional actors while shooting without a full crew in an actual take-out restaurant during operating hours.

Charles Jang is a Korean-American actor born on Long Island who learned Chinese while studying abroad in Taiwan. Co-director Shih-Ching Tsou, who is from Taiwan, assumed that he was from China when he auditioned.

== Release ==
Take Out debuted at the Slamdance Film Festival in January 2004. The film had already been screened in over 25 film festivals when lawyers representing Baker and Tsou sent a cease and desist letter to filmmaker Seth Landau who was planning to release a film with the same name. The case went into arbitration under rules of the Motion Picture Association of America in November 2005. Baker and Tsou were represented by patent attorney S. Stephen Baker of the law firm Baker and Rannells, P.A., who also happens to be Sean Baker's father.

The film was not given a limited release through CAVU Pictures until 2008. On September 1, 2009, Kino Entertainment released Take Out in the US on a Region 1 DVD. In September 2022, the film was given a Blu-ray release as part of the Criterion Collection.

== Reception ==
On the review aggregator website Rotten Tomatoes, 100% of 27 critics' reviews are positive. The website's consensus reads: "Take Out presents an unvarnished view of one immigrant's experiences as a restaurant deliveryman – and leaves the audience with plenty of food for thought." Metacritic, which uses a weighted average, assigned the film a score of 80 out of 100, based on 10 critics, indicating "generally favorable" reviews.

Audience members at a screening assumed the actor who played Ming Ding was in real peril and asked how he was doing, when in reality Jang was working for Google and studying for his M.B.A.

=== Accolades ===
Take Out was nominated for the John Cassavetes Award at the 2008 Independent Spirit Awards. It also won the Grand Jury Prize at the Nashville Film Festival.
